= List of peerages created for British princes =

This page lists all peerages created for British princes since 1714. The list does not include creations of the titles of Prince of Wales and Earl of Chester.

== List of peerages ==
=== Non-extant peerages ===
Peerage	Prince	Status	Created	Subsidiary Titles
Reign of King George I
Duke of York and Albany	Prince Ernest Augustus	Extinct in 1728	1716	Earl of Ulster
Duke of Edinburgh	Prince Frederick	Merged with the Crown in 1760	1726	Marquess of the Isle of Ely
Duke of Edinburgh	Prince Frederick	Merged with the Crown in 1760	1726	Earl of Eltham
Duke of Edinburgh	Prince Frederick	Merged with the Crown in 1760	1726	Viscount Launceston
Duke of Edinburgh	Prince Frederick	Merged with the Crown in 1760	1726	Baron Snowdon
Duke of Cumberland	Prince William	Extinct in 1765	1726	Marquess of Berkhamstead
Duke of Cumberland	Prince William	Extinct in 1765	1726	Earl of Kennington
Duke of Cumberland	Prince William	Extinct in 1765	1726	Viscount Trematon
Duke of Cumberland	Prince William	Extinct in 1765	1726	Baron Alderney
Reign of King George II
Duke of York and Albany	Prince Edward	Extinct in 1767	1760	Earl of Ulster
Reign of King George III
Duke of Gloucester and Edinburgh	Prince William	Extinct in 1834	1764	Earl of Connaught
Duke of Cumberland and Strathearn	Prince Henry	Extinct in 1790	1766	Earl of Dublin
Duke of York and Albany	Prince Frederick	Extinct in 1827	1784	Earl of Ulster
Duke of Clarence and St Andrews	Prince William Henry	Merged with the Crown in 1830	1789	Earl of Munster
Duke of Kent and Strathearn	Prince Edward	Extinct in 1820	1799	Earl of Dublin
Duke of Cumberland and Teviotdale	Prince Ernest Augustus	Deprived in 1919	1799	Earl of Armagh
Duke of Sussex	Prince Augustus Frederick	Extinct in 1843	1801	Earl of Inverness
Duke of Sussex	Prince Augustus Frederick	Extinct in 1843	1801	Baron Arklow
Duke of Cambridge	Prince Adolphus	Extinct in 1904	1801	Earl of Tipperary
Duke of Cambridge	Prince Adolphus	Extinct in 1904	1801	Baron Culloden
Reign of Queen Victoria
Earl of Dublin	Albert Edward, Prince of Wales	Merged with the Crown in 1901	1849	
Duke of Edinburgh	Prince Alfred	Extinct in 1900	1866	Earl of Kent
Duke of Edinburgh	Prince Alfred	Extinct in 1900	1866	Earl of Ulster
Duke of Connaught and Strathearn	Prince Arthur	Extinct in 1943	1874	Earl of Sussex
Duke of Albany	Prince Leopold	Deprived in 1919	1881	Earl of Clarence
Duke of Albany	Prince Leopold	Deprived in 1919	1881	Baron Arklow
Duke of Clarence and Avondale	Prince Albert Victor of Wales	Extinct in 1892	1890	Earl of Athlone
Duke of York	Prince George of Wales	Merged with the Crown in 1910	1892	Earl of Inverness
Duke of York	Prince George of Wales	Merged with the Crown in 1910	1892	Baron Killarney
Reign of King George V
Duke of York	Prince Albert	Merged with the Crown in 1936	1920	Earl of Inverness
Duke of York	Prince Albert	Merged with the Crown in 1936	1920	Baron Killarney
Reign of King George VI
Duke of Windsor	Prince Edward	Extinct in 1972	1937	
Duke of Edinburgh	Prince Philip (Note: Philip, who was formerly a prince of Greece and Denmark, was created a British prince in 1957 by his wife, Queen Elizabeth II.)	Merged with the Crown in 2022	1947	Earl of Merioneth
Duke of Edinburgh	Prince Philip	Merged with the Crown in 2022	1947	Baron Greenwich

=== Extant peerages ===
Peerage	Prince	Status	Created	Subsidiary Titles
Reign of King George V
Duke of Gloucester	Prince Henry	Extant	1928	Earl of Ulster
Duke of Gloucester	Prince Henry	Extant	1928	Baron Culloden
Duke of Kent	Prince George	Extant	1934	Earl of St Andrews
Duke of Kent	Prince George	Extant	1934	Baron Downpatrick
Reign of Queen Elizabeth II
Duke of York	Prince Andrew	Extant (not in use) (Note: Andrew ceased using his peerage titles and was removed from the Roll of the Peerage in 2025.)	1986	Earl of Inverness
Duke of York	Prince Andrew	Extant (not in use)	1986	Baron Killyleagh
Earl of Wessex	Prince Edward	Extant	1999	Viscount Severn
Duke of Cambridge	Prince William of Wales	Extant	2011	Earl of Strathearn
Duke of Cambridge	Prince William of Wales	Extant	2011	Baron Carrickfergus
Duke of Sussex	Prince Henry of Wales	Extant	2018	Earl of Dumbarton
Duke of Sussex	Prince Henry of Wales	Extant	2018	Baron Kilkeel
Earl of Forfar	Prince Edward, Earl of Wessex	Extant	2019	
Reign of King Charles III
Duke of Edinburgh	Prince Edward, Earl of Wessex and Forfar	Extant (for life)	2023	

== See also ==
- Royal dukedoms in the United Kingdom
