= Baron Arklow =

Title in the Peerage of the United Kingdom

Barony of Arklow
- Arms of Prince Leopold, Duke of Albany
- Creation date: 24 May 1881
- Creation: Second
- Created by: Queen Victoria
- Peerage: Peerage of the United Kingdom
- First holder: Prince Augustus Frederick
- Last holder: Prince Charles Edward
- Remainder to: the 1st Baron's heirs male of the body lawfully begotten
- Status: Suspended

Baron Arklow was a title in the Peerage of the United Kingdom that has been created twice. Arklow is a town in County Wicklow in Ireland.

== History ==
=== First creation, 1801 ===
It was created first in 1801 as a substantive title by King George III for his son Prince Augustus Frederick. Augustus Frederick was also created Duke of Sussex and Earl of Inverness, on the same day. The title became extinct upon Prince Augustus Frederick's death in 1843.

Although Prince Augustus Frederick was survived by a son and daughter by Lady Augusta Murray, their marriage (purportedly solemnized at St George's Hanover Square Church, Westminster, in 1793) had been annulled for lack of royal permission under the Royal Marriages Act 1772, rendering the children illegitimate under English law and unable to inherit titles from their father. Both children by the annulled marriage died childless, rendering the issue of their inheritance moot.

On 2 May 1831, Prince Augustus Frederick married secondly (and again in contravention of the Royal Marriages Act 1772), Lady Cecilia Gore at Great Cumberland Place, London. Not being the Prince's legitimate wife, Lady Cecilia could not be received at court. On 30 March 1840, she was given the title of Duchess of Inverness in her own right by Queen Victoria.

=== Second creation, 1881 ===
The second creation in 1881, as a substantive title by Queen Victoria for her son Prince Leopold. Leopold was also created Duke of Albany and Earl of Clarence, on the same day. Prince Leopold's son, Prince Charles Edward (who had succeeded as reigning Duke of Saxe-Coburg and Gotha in 1900), was deprived of the peerage in 1919 for bearing arms against the United Kingdom in World War I.

== Baron Arklow, first Creation (1801) ==
| Baron | Portrait | Birth | Marriage(s) | Death |
|---|---|---|---|---|
| Prince Augustus Frederick; House of Hanover; 1801–1843 also: Duke of Sussex and Earl of Inverness (1801) | Prince Augustus Frederick | 27 January 1773; Buckingham House, London son of King George III and Queen Charlotte | 4 April 1793; Lady Augusta Murray; 2 children 2 May 1831; Lady Cecilia Underwood; No children | 21 April 1843; Kensington Palace, London aged 70 |
Prince Augustus' marriage to Lady Augusta Murray, which produced two children, was invalid under the Royal Marriages Act 1772; accordingly all his titles became extinct on his death.

== Baron Arklow, second Creation (1881) ==
| Baron | Portrait | Birth | Marriage(s) | Death |
|---|---|---|---|---|
| Prince Leopold; House of Saxe-Coburg and Gotha; 1882–1884 also: Duke of Albany and Earl of Clarence (1881) | Prince Arthur | 7 April 1853; Buckingham Palace, London son of Queen Victoria and Prince Albert | Princess Helena of Waldeck and Pyrmont; 27 April 1882; 2 children | 28 March 1884; Villa Nevada, Cannes aged 30 |
| Prince Charles Edward; House of Saxe-Coburg and Gotha; 1884–1919 also: Duke of Albany and Earl of Clarence (1881) | Prince Arthur | 19 July 1884; Claremont, Esher son of Prince Leopold and Princess Helena | Princess Victoria Adelaide of Schleswig-Holstein; 11 October 1905; 5 children | 6 March 1954; Coburg aged 69 |
The Titles Deprivation Act 1917 suspended the title on 28 March 1919.

== Family tree ==
Family tree of the Dukes of Sussex, Earls of Dumbarton, Earls of Inverness, Barons Kilkeel, Barons Arklow

George III; 1738–1820
Duke of Sussex (1st creation), Earl of Inverness (1st creation), and Baron Arklow (1st creation), 1801
Edward; 1767–1820; Duke of Kent and Strathearn | Augustus Frederick; 1773–1843; Duke of Sussex
Dukedom extinct, 1843
Queen Victoria; 1819–1901
Baron Arklow (2nd creation), 1881
Edward VII; 1841–1910 | Leopold; 1853–1884; Duke of Albany, Earl of Clarence, 1st Baron Arklow
Earl of Inverness (2nd creation), 1892
George Frederick Ernest Albert; 1865–1936; Earl of Inverness, later King George V | Charles Edward; 1884–1919; Duke of Albany, Earl of Clarence, 2nd Baron Arklow
Earldom of Inverness (2nd creation) merged with the crown, 1910 | Barony Arklow (2nd creation) forfeit, 1919
Earl of Inverness (3rd creation), 1920
Albert Frederick Arthur George; 1895–1952; Earl of Inverness, later King George VI
Earldom of Inverness (3rd creation) merged with the crown, 1936
Queen Elizabeth II; 1926–2022
Earl of Inverness (4th creation), 1986
Charles III b. 1948 | Andrew Mountbatten-Windsor b. 1960; Duke of York, Earl of Inverness, Baron Killyleagh
Earldom of Inverness is not inherited
Duke of Sussex (2nd creation), Earl of Dumbarton, Baron Kilkeel, 2018
Harry; Duke of Sussex, Earl of Dumbarton, Baron Kilkeel b. 1984
Prince Archie of Sussex b. 2019
Heir apparent
