= Baron Killarney =

Extinct barony in the Peerage of the United Kingdom

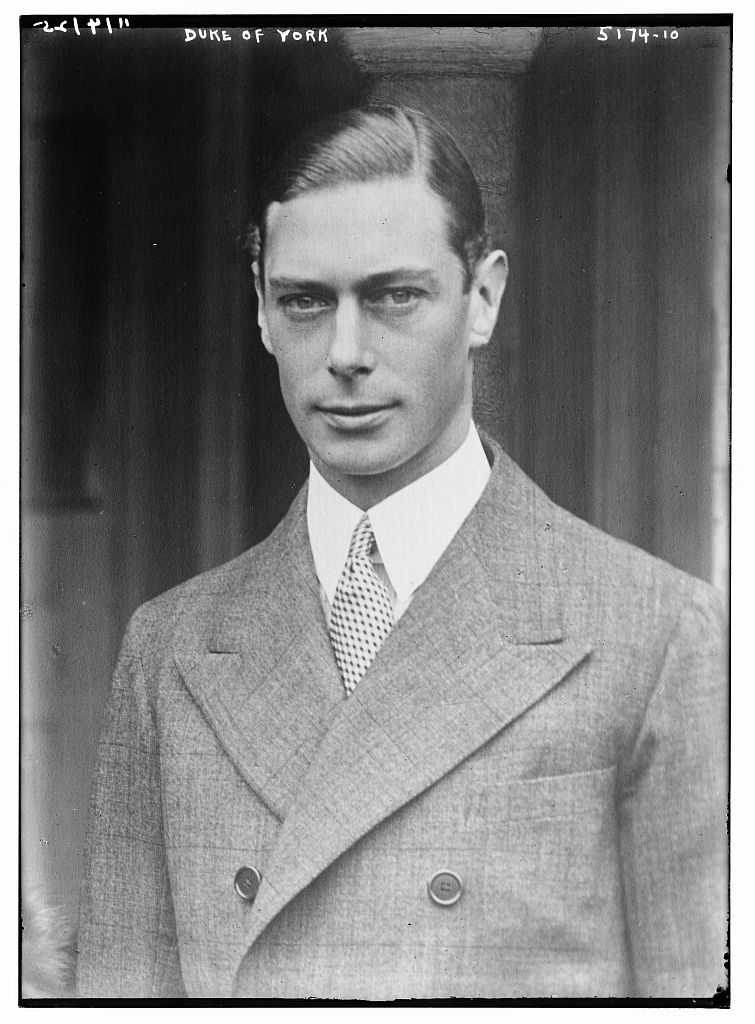
George VI, the last Baron Killarney in 1920

Baron Killarney was a title in the Peerage of the United Kingdom that has been created twice. The first creation came on 24 May 1892 as a substantive title by Queen Victoria for her grandson Prince George, Duke of York. George was also created Duke of York and Earl of Inverness, on the same day. In 1910 upon his ascension as King George V, his titles merged with the crown. The second creation came on 24 May 1920, as a substantive title by King George V for his son Prince Albert, Duke of York. Albert was also created Duke of York and Earl of Inverness, on the same day. Upon King Edward VIII's abdication in 1936, Albert's titles merged with the crown, upon his succession as King George VI.

It is named after the town and civil parish of Killarney, County Kerry, Ireland (now the Republic of Ireland).

== Baron Killarney; first creation (1892) ==
Baron	Portrait	Birth	Marriage(s)	Death
George Frederick Ernest Albert; House of Saxe-Coburg and Gotha; 1892–1910 also:Duke of York and Earl of Inverness(1892); Prince of Wales, Duke of Cornwall, and Duke of Rothesay (1901)	Prince George	3 June 1865; Marlborough House son of Edward VII and Alexandra of Denmark	Mary of Teck; 6 July 1893; 6 children	20 January 1936; Sandringham House, Sandringham aged 70
Prince George succeeded as King George V in 1910 upon his father's death, and his titles merged with the crown.

== Baron Killarney, second creation (1920) ==
Baron	Portrait	Birth	Marriage(s)	Death
Prince Albert; House of Windsor; 1920–1936 also: Duke of York and Earl of Inverness (1920)		14 December 1895; Sandringham House, Sandringham son of King George V and Queen Mary	Elizabeth Bowes-Lyon; 26 April 1923; 2 children	6 February 1952; Sandringham House, Sandringham aged 56
Prince Albert succeeded as King George VI in 1936 upon his brother's abdication, and his titles merged with the crown.

== Family tree ==
Peerages of Albany, Arklow, Inverness, Ulster and York family tree

Earl of Ulster (1st Irish creation), 1205
Hugh de Lacy c. 1176–1271; Earl of Ulster
Earl of Ulster (2nd Irish creation), 1264
Maud de Lacy	Walter de Burgh c. 1210–1271; 1st Earl of Ulster, 2nd Lord of Connaught
Richard Óg de Burgh; 1259–1326; 2nd Earl of Ulster
John de Burgh d. 1313
Robert II of Scotland; 1316–1390	Edward III of England; 1312–1377	William Donn de Burgh; 1312–1333; 3rd Earl of Ulster
Lionel of Antwerp; 1338–1368; Duke of Clarence, Earl of Ulster (jure uxoris)	Elizabeth de Burgh; 1332–1363; 4th Countess of Ulster suo jure
Duke of Albany (1st creation), 1398	Duke of York (1st creation), 1385
Robert III of Scotland; 1337–1406	Robert Stewart c. 1340–1420; 1st Duke of Albany	Edmund of Langley; 1341–1402; 1st Duke of York	Philippa of Clarence; 1355–1382; 5th Countess of Ulster
Murdoch Stewart; 1362–1425; 2nd Duke of Albany	Roger Mortimer; 1374–1398; 6th Earl of Ulster, Earl of March
Dukedom of Albany (1st creation) forfeit, 1425
Edward of Norwich; 1373–1415; 2nd Duke of York	Richard of Conisburgh; 1375–1415; Earl of Cambridge	Anne Mortimer; 1388–c. 1411	Edmund Mortimer; 1391–1425; 7th Earl of Ulster, Earl of March
James I of Scotland; 1394–1437	Richard of York; 1411–1460; 3rd Duke of York, 8th Earl of Ulster, Earl of March
James II of Scotland; 1430–1460	Prince Edward; 1442–1483; 4th Duke of York, 9th Earl of Ulster, Earl of March; Later Edward IV of England
Dukedom of York (1st creation) and Earldom of Ulster (2nd Irish creation) merged in the Crown, 1461
Duke of Albany (2nd creation), 1458	Duke of York (2nd creation), 1474
Alexander Stewart; 1454–1485; 1st Duke of Albany	James III of Scotland; 1451–1488	Elizabeth of York; 1466–1503	Richard of Shrewsbury; 1473–1483; Duke of York
Dukedom of Albany (2nd creation) forfeit, 1479 restored, 1482 forfeited, 1483	Dukedom of York (2nd creation) extinct, 1483
Duke of Albany (2nd creation) restored, 1515	Duke of York (3rd creation), 1494
John Stewart; 1484–1536; 2nd Duke of Albany	James IV of Scotland; 1473–1513	Margaret Tudor; 1489–1541	Prince Henry; 1491–1547; Duke of York; Later Henry VIII of England
Dukedom of Albany (2nd creation) extinct, 1536	Dukedom of York (3rd creation) merged in the Crown, 1509
James V of Scotland; 1512–1542
Duke of Albany (3rd creation), 1565
Prince Arthur Stewart; 1541 styled Duke of Albany	Mary, Queen of Scots; 1542–1587	Henry Stuart, Lord Darnley; 1545–1567; 1st Duke of Albany
Prince James; 1566–1625; 2nd Duke of Albany; Later James VI & I of Scotland and England
Dukedom of Albany (3rd creation) merged in the Crown, 1567
Duke of Albany (4th creation), 1604; Duke of York (4th creation), 1605
Henry Frederick; 1594–1612	Elizabeth Stuart; 1596–1662	Prince Charles; 1600–1649; Duke of Albany, Duke of York; Later Charles I of Scotland and England
Dukedoms of York (4th creation) and Albany (4th creation) merged in the Crown, 1625
Duke of York (5th creation) 1644; Earl of Ulster (3rd Irish creation), 1659; Duke of Albany (5th creation), 1660
Sophia of Hanover; 1630–1714	Charles II of Scotland and England; 1630–1685	James Stuart; 1633–1701; Duke of York, Duke of Albany, Earl of Ulster; Later James II of Scotland and England
Dukedoms of Albany (5th creation) and York (5th creation), and Earldom of Ulster (3rd Irish creation) merged in the Crown, 1685
Duke of York and Albany (1st creation) and Earl of Ulster (4th Irish creation), 1716
George I of Great Britain; 1660–1727	Ernest Augustus; 1674–1728; Prince-Bishop of Osnabrück, Duke of York and Albany, Earl of Ulster
Dukedom of York and Albany (1st creation) and Earldom of Ulster (4th Irish creation) extinct, 1728
George II of Great Britain; 1683–1760
Prince Frederick Louis; 1707–1751; Duke of Gloucester, Duke of Edinburgh
Duke of York and Albany (2nd creation) and Earl of Ulster (5th Irish creation), 1760
George III of the United Kingdom; 1738–1820	Prince Edward; 1739–1767; Duke of York and Albany
Dukedom of York and Albany (2nd creation) and Earldom of Ulster (5th Irish creation) extinct, 1767
Duke of York and Albany (3rd creation) and Earl of Ulster (6th Irish creation), 1784	Earl of Inverness (1st creation), and Baron Arklow (1st creation), 1801
George IV of the United Kingdom; 1762–1830	Prince Frederick; 1763–1827; Duke of York and Albany	Prince Edward; 1767–1820; Duke of Kent and Strathearn	Prince Augustus Frederick; 1773–1843; Duke of Sussex, Earl of Inverness and Baron Arklow
Dukedom of York and Albany (3rd creation) and Earldom of Ulster (6th Irish creation) extinct, 1827	Earldom of Inverness and Barony Arklow extinct, 1843
Queen Victoria of the United Kingdom; 1819–1901
Earl of Ulster (1st UK creation), 1866	Duke of Albany (6th creation), Earl of Clarence, and Baron Arklow (2nd creation), 1881
Edward VII of the United Kingdom; 1841–1910	Prince Alfred Ernest Albert; 1844–1900; Duke of Edinburgh, Duke of Saxe-Coburg and Gotha, Earl of Ulster	Prince Leopold; 1853–1884; Duke of Saxe-Coburg and Gotha, 1st Duke of Albany, Earl of Clarence, and Baron Arklow
Earldom of Ulster (1st UK creation) extinct, 1900
Duke of York (6th creation), Earl of Inverness (2nd creation) and Baron Killarney (1st creation), 1892
Prince Albert Victor; 1864–1892; Duke of Clarence and Avondale	Prince George; 1865–1936; Duke of York, Earl of Inverness, and Baron Killarney; Later George V of the United Kingdom	Charles Edward; 1884–1954; Duke of Saxe-Coburg and Gotha, 2nd Duke of Albany, Earl of Clarence, and Baron Arklow
Dukedom of York (6th creation), Earldom of Inverness (2nd creation), Barony Killarney (1st creation) merged in the Crown, 1910	Dukedom of Albany (6th creation) forfeit, 1919
Duke of York (7th creation), Earl of Inverness (3rd creation) and Baron Killarney (2nd creation), 1920	Earl of Ulster (2nd UK creation), 1928
Edward VIII of the United Kingdom; 1894–1972; Duke of Windsor	Prince Albert; 1895–1952; Duke of York; Later George VI of the United Kingdom	Prince Henry; 1900–1974; Duke of Gloucester, 1st Earl of Ulster
Dukedom of York (7th creation), Earldom of Inverness (3rd creation), Barony Killarney (2nd creation) merged in the Crown, 1936
Elizabeth II of the United Kingdom; 1926–2022
Duke of York (8th creation), Earl of Inverness (4th creation) and Baron Killyleagh, 1986
Charles III of the United Kingdom b. 1948	Andrew Mountbatten-Windsor b. 1960; Duke of York, Earl of Inverness, and Baron Killyleagh	Prince Richard b. 1944; Duke of Gloucester, 2nd Earl of Ulster
Alexander Windsor b. 1974 styled Earl of Ulster
Heir apparent to the Earldom of Ulster
