= Earl of Inverness =

Earldom in the Peerage of the United Kingdom

Earldom of Inverness
- Creation date: 23 June 1986
- Creation: Fourth
- Created by: Elizabeth II
- Peerage: Peerage of the United Kingdom
- First holder: Prince Augustus Frederick
- Present holder: Andrew Mountbatten-Windsor (not using title)
- Remainder to: the 1st Earl's heirs male of the body lawfully begotten
- Status: Extant, not in use

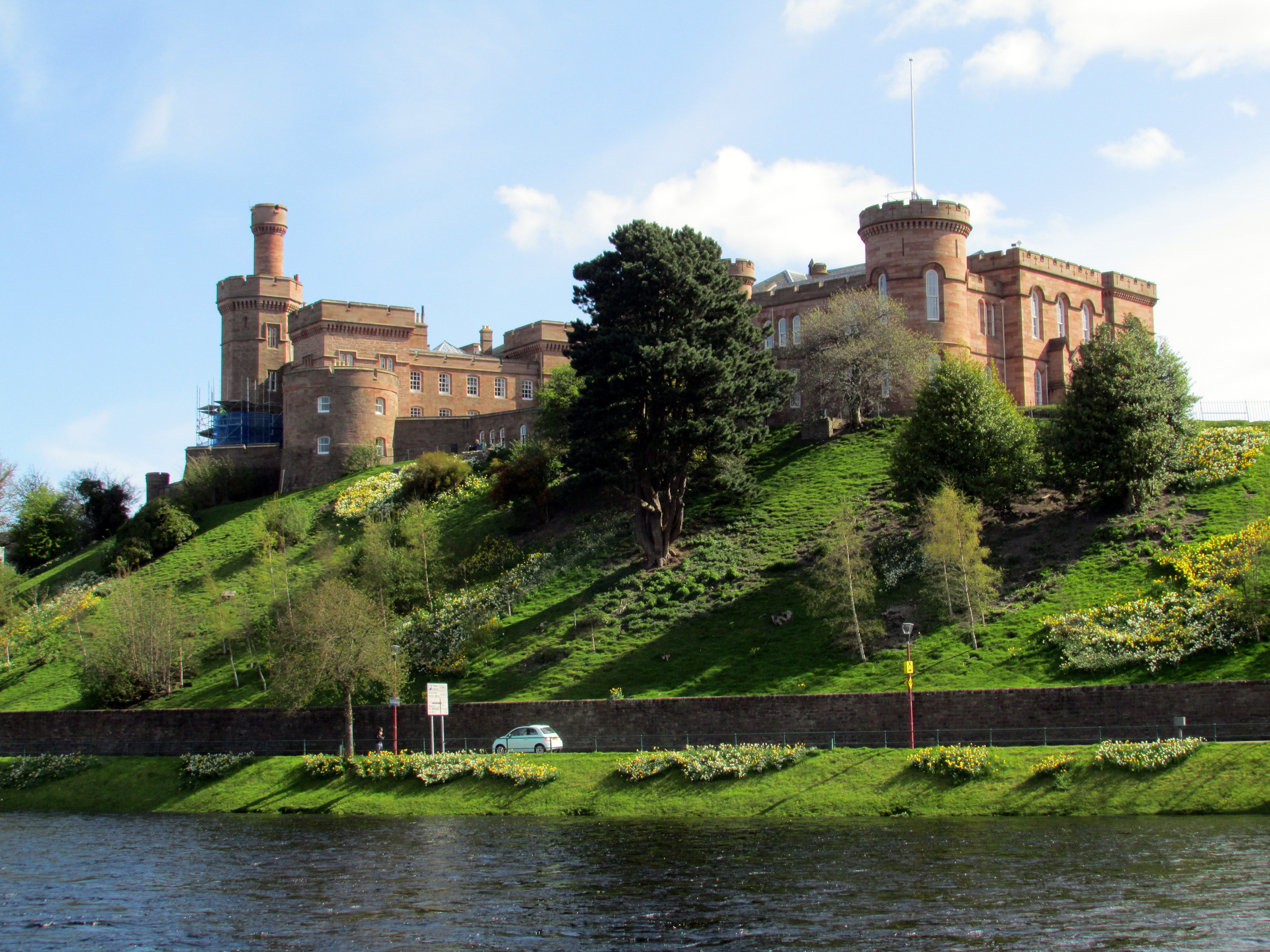
Inverness Castle

The title of Earl of Inverness (Scottish Gaelic: Iarla Inbhir Nis) is a title of nobility in the Peerage of the United Kingdom. It was first created in 1718 in the Jacobite Peerage of Scotland, together with the titles Viscount of Innerpaphrie and Lord Cromlix and Erne, by James Francis Edward Stuart ("James III & VIII") for the Honourable John Hay of Cromlix, third son of the 7th Earl of Kinnoull. He was created Duke of Inverness in 1727, but both titles became extinct upon the death of the grantee in 1740.

It has been created several times in of the Peerage of the United Kingdom, each time as a subsidiary title for a member of the royal family. It was created first in 1801 as a subsidiary title of Prince Augustus Frederick, Duke of Sussex, sixth son of George III, becoming extinct in 1843. Sussex's second wife, Cecilia Underwood (whom he married in contravention of the Royal Marriages Act 1772 making the marriage legally void), was given the title of Duchess of Inverness in her own right, which became extinct upon her death in 1873.

The next creation was for Prince George (later George V), second son of Albert Edward, Prince of Wales (later Edward VII) and grandson of Queen Victoria, as a subsidiary title along with the Dukedom of York. As the Prince became King in 1910, succeeding his father, his titles merged in the crown.

The title was created again in 1920 as a subsidiary title of the Prince Albert (second son of George V), who was also created Duke of York at the same time. The title merged in the crown when Albert succeeded his brother in 1936 to become King George VI.

The title was created a fourth time in 1986 as a subsidiary title for Queen Elizabeth II's second son, Prince Andrew, who was also created Duke of York along with the title of Baron Killyleagh.

In 2019, some residents of Inverness started a campaign to strip him of that title, stating that "it is inappropriate that Prince Andrew is associated with our beautiful city," in reference to the prince's infamous friendship with disgraced financier and child sex trafficker Jeffrey Epstein. In 2022, there was a renewed petition to remove his title. On 17 October 2025, Andrew announced he would cease to use all his honours and titles.

== Earls of Inverness, first Creation (1801) ==
Earl	Portrait	Birth	Marriage(s)	Death
Prince Augustus Frederick; House of Hanover; 1801–1843 also: Duke of Sussex and Baron Arklow (1801)	Prince Augustus Frederick	27 January 1773; Buckingham House, London son of King George III and Queen Charlotte	4 April 1793; Lady Augusta Murray; 2 children 2 May 1831; Lady Cecilia Underwood; No children	21 April 1843; Kensington Palace, London aged 70
Prince Augustus' marriage to Lady Augusta Murray, which produced two children, was invalid under the Royal Marriages Act 1772; accordingly all his titles became extinct on his death.

== Earls of Inverness, second Creation (1892) ==
Earl	Portrait	Birth	Marriage(s)	Death
Prince George; House of Saxe-Coburg and Gotha; 1892–1910 also: Duke of York and Baron Killarney (1892); Prince of Wales (1901), Duke of Cornwall (1337) and Duke of Rothesay (1398)	Prince George	3 June 1865; Marlborough House son of King Edward VII and Queen Alexandra	Mary of Teck; 6 July 1893; 6 children	20 January 1936; Sandringham House, Sandringham aged 70
Prince George succeeded as King George V in 1910 upon his father's death, and his titles merged with the crown.

== Earls of Inverness, third Creation (1920) ==
Earl	Portrait	Birth	Marriage(s)	Death
Prince Albert; House of Windsor; 1920–1936 also: Duke of York and Baron Killarney (1920)		14 December 1895; Sandringham House, Sandringham son of King George V and Queen Mary	Elizabeth Bowes-Lyon; 26 April 1923; 2 children	6 February 1952; Sandringham House, Sandringham aged 56
Prince Albert succeeded as King George VI in 1936 upon his brother's abdication, and his titles merged with the crown.

== Earls of Inverness, fourth Creation (1986) ==
Earl	Portrait	Birth	Marriage(s)	Death
Prince Andrew; House of Windsor; 1986–present also formerly: Duke of York and Baron Killyleagh (1986)		19 February 1960; Buckingham Palace son of Elizabeth II and Prince Philip, Duke of Edinburgh	Sarah Ferguson; 23 July 1986 – 30 May 1996 (divorce); 2 children	Alive
On 30 October 2025, his name was removed from the Roll of the Peerage.

== Family tree ==
Family tree of the Dukes of Sussex, Earls of Dumbarton, Earls of Inverness, Barons Kilkeel, Barons Arklow

George III; 1738–1820
Duke of Sussex (1st creation), Earl of Inverness (1st creation), and Baron Arklow (1st creation), 1801
Edward; 1767–1820; Duke of Kent and Strathearn	Augustus Frederick; 1773–1843; Duke of Sussex
Dukedom extinct, 1843
Queen Victoria; 1819–1901
Baron Arklow (2nd creation), 1881
Edward VII; 1841–1910	Leopold; 1853–1884; Duke of Albany, Earl of Clarence, 1st Baron Arklow
Earl of Inverness (2nd creation), 1892
George Frederick Ernest Albert; 1865–1936; Earl of Inverness, later King George V	Charles Edward; 1884–1919; Duke of Albany, Earl of Clarence, 2nd Baron Arklow
Earldom of Inverness (2nd creation) merged with the crown, 1910	Barony Arklow (2nd creation) forfeit, 1919
Earl of Inverness (3rd creation), 1920
Albert Frederick Arthur George; 1895–1952; Earl of Inverness, later King George VI
Earldom of Inverness (3rd creation) merged with the crown, 1936
Queen Elizabeth II; 1926–2022
Earl of Inverness (4th creation), 1986
Charles III b. 1948	Andrew Mountbatten-Windsor b. 1960; Duke of York, Earl of Inverness, Baron Killyleagh
Earldom of Inverness is not inherited
Duke of Sussex (2nd creation), Earl of Dumbarton, Baron Kilkeel, 2018
Harry; Duke of Sussex, Earl of Dumbarton, Baron Kilkeel b. 1984
Prince Archie of Sussex b. 2019
Heir apparent
