= Robert Stuart, Duke of Kintyre =

Robert
- Duke of Kintyre
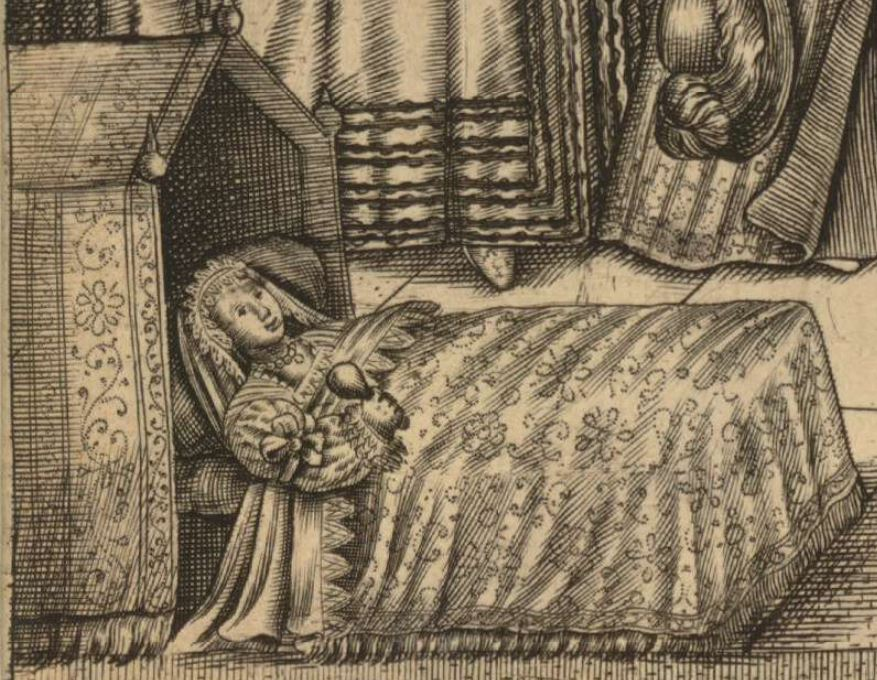
- Robert in a 1625 engraving by James Webster
- Born: 18 January 1602; Dunfermline Palace, Fife, Scotland
- Died: 27 May 1602 (aged 4 months 9 days); Dunfermline Palace, Fife, Scotland
- Burial: Holyrood Abbey
Names
- Robert Bruce Stuart
- House: Stuart
- Father: James VI and I
- Mother: Anne of Denmark

Robert Bruce Stuart, Duke of Kintyre (18 January 1602 – 27 May 1602) was the fifth child of James VI and I (king of England, Ireland and Scotland) and Anne of Denmark. Named after Robert the Bruce, he died in infancy.

== A royal birth ==
He was born at Dunfermline Palace, Fife. On 2 May 1602 he was created Duke of Kintyre, Marquess of Wigton, Earl of Carrick and Lord of Annandale. He died at Dunfermline Palace on 27 May 1602 and was buried at Holyrood Abbey. His older siblings included Henry Frederick, Prince of Wales, Elizabeth, and Charles.

Robert's birth was attended by the physicians Martin Schöner and John Naysmyth and the midwife Janet Kinloch. He was born at 1 o'clock in the morning. The page John Murray brought news of the birth to the king, who was staying at Edinburgh, and had set out to visit the queen. Edinburgh Castle gave a cannon salute. James VI gave Anne of Denmark a gift of a pointed diamond. Robert's nurse Isobel Colt was dressed in black velvet.

== Baptism ==
The baptism was delayed longer than was usual. It was widely believed that Prince Henry would be godfather and after the baptism he would stay at Dunfermline Palace with his mother, but this did not come to be, despite the king's promise.

On 2 May 1602 Robert was carried from Dunfermline Palace into the Abbey by the Duke of Lennox on a large purple cushion for his baptism. Lord Oliphant carried the crown ducal, the Master of Angus carried the ewer and towel, and the Master of Paisley brought the basin. The crown ducal used at the baptism of Prince Henry in 1594 was described as "low crown, competent for a duke, set with diamonds, sapphires, emeralds, and rubies", meaning a circlet without the raised arches of imperial crowns.

Robert's name and titles were proclaimed by trumpeters at the windows of the abbey, and the celebrations involved a tournament of "running at the ring" which damaged a cornfield. The sum of £66-13s-4d Scots was thrown into the crowd as largesse. Several men were knighted, including Adrian Damman, the resident agent of the Dutch States. On the previous day an English Catholic, Humphrey Dethick, either the son of a London baker or from Ashbourne, Derbyshire, killed one of the guests, claiming to be acting to fulfil a prophecy told to him in Spain.

== Sickness and death ==
Margaret Stewart, Mistress of Ochiltree, the senior lady in waiting, was in charge of Robert's care. Marion Hepburn was appointed to rock Robert's cradle. Isobel Colt, the nurse, was the wife of Patrick Smith, an Edinburgh lawyer and writer to the signet. She was dismissed shortly before the death of Duke Robert, as it was thought a new nurse would improve his health. Isobel was given £200 Scots as a reward for her service by the English courtier Roger Aston on 25 May. The payment was witnessed by John Buchanan, who later married Margaret Hartsyde, a servant of the queen.

When Robert was ill and Princess Elizabeth at Linlithgow Palace was sick with the measles, Anne of Denmark was "sorrowful and more than ever she was before", but she told James, "If it please God to take one of our children, He will send us another, for I feel myself with child."

David Calderwood wrote that Doctor Hereis got little thanks for his care of the prince. For a time, according to George Nicolson, Prince Henry, who was kept at Stirling Castle, was allowed to visit and comfort his mother Anne of Denmark at Falkland Palace.

== Family trees ==
Ancestors of Robert Stuart, Duke of Kintyre

8. Matthew Stewart, 4th Earl of Lennox
4. Henry Stuart, Lord Darnley
9. Margaret Douglas
2. James I of England
10. James V of Scotland
5. Mary, Queen of Scots
11. Mary of Guise
1. Robert Stuart, Duke of Kintyre
12. Christian III of Denmark
6. Frederick II of Denmark
13. Dorothea of Saxe-Lauenburg
3. Anne of Denmark
14. Ulrich III of Mecklenburg-Güstrow
7. Sophie of Mecklenburg-Güstrow
15. Elizabeth of Denmark

Family tree of British royal dukes

Includes dukes of: Albany, Albemarle, Bedford, Cambridge, Clarence, Connaught and Strathearn, Cumberland, Edinburgh, Gloucester, Gloucester and Edinburgh, Hereford, Kent, Kintyre and Lorne, Norfolk, Ross, Somerset, Sussex, Windsor, and York, but only when royally.

Non-royal dukes are not included; see Royal dukedoms in the United Kingdom.
Also not included are titles mandated for use by the heir apparent (Duke of Rothesay and the 1337 creation of the Duke of Cornwall), see Princes of Wales family tree.

King Robert II; 1316–1390	King Edward III; 1312–1377
Duke of Albany (1st creation), 1398	Duke of Clarence (1st creation), 1362	Duke of York (1st creation), 1385
King Robert III c. 1337–1406	Robert Stewart c. 1340–1420; 1st Duke of Albany	Edward the Black Prince; 1330–1376	Lionel of Antwerp; 1338–1368; Duke of Clarence	John of Gaunt; 1340–1399	Edmund; 1341–1402; 1st Duke of York
Dukedom of Clarence (1st creation) extinct, 1368
Duke of Cornwall (2nd creation), 1376	Duke of Hereford, 1397	Duke of Gloucester (1st creation), 1385
Murdoch Stewart c. 1362–1425; 2nd Duke of Albany	Richard of Bordeaux; 1367–1400; Duke of Cornwall, later King Richard II	Henry Bolingbroke; 1367–1413; Duke of Hereford, later King Henry IV	Thomas of Woodstock; 1355–1397; Duke of Gloucester
Dukedom of Albany (1st creation) forfeit, 1425	Dukedom of Cornwall (2nd creation) merged in the crown, 1377	Dukedom of Hereford merged in the crown, 1399	Dukedom of Gloucester (1st creation) extinct, 1397
Duke of Clarence (2nd creation), 1412	Duke of Bedford (1st & 2nd creations), 1414	Duke of Gloucester (2nd creation), 1414	Duke of Albemarle (Aumale) (1st creation), 1397
Thomas of Lancaster; 1387–1421; Duke of Clarence	John of Lancaster; 1389–1435; Duke of Bedford; Surrendered dukedom and then regranted, 1433	Humphrey of Lancaster; 1390–1447; Duke of Gloucester	John Beaufort; 1373–1410	Joan Beaufort c. 1379–1440	Edward of Norwich c. 1373–1415; Duke of Aumale, 2nd Duke of York	Richard of Conisburgh; 1385–1415
Dukedom of Clarence (2nd creation) extinct, 1421	Dukedom of Bedford (2nd creation) extinct, 1435	Dukedom of Gloucester (2nd creation) extinct, 1447	Dukedom of Albemarle (Aumale) (1st creation) forfeit, 1399
Duke of York (1st creation) restored, 1425; Duke of Cornwall (3rd creation), 1460
King James I 1394–1437	Joan Beaufort c. 1404–1445	Owen Tudor c. 1400–1461	John Beaufort; 1404–1444	Richard Neville; 1400–1460	Cecily Neville; 1415–1495	Richard of York; 1411–1460; 3rd Duke of York, Duke of Cornwall
Duke of Cornwall (3rd creation) extinct, 1460
Duke of Bedford (5th creation), 1485	Duke of Clarence (3rd creation), 1461	Duke of Gloucester (3rd creation), 1461
King James II; 1430–1460	Jasper Tudor c. 1431–1495; Duke of Bedford	Edmund Tudor c. 1430–1456	Lady Margaret Beaufort; 1443–1509	John Neville c. 1431–1471	Elizabeth Woodville c. 1437–1492	Edward; 1442–1483; 4th Duke of York, later King Edward IV	George Plantagenet; 1449–1478; Duke of Clarence	Richard of York; 1452–1485; Duke of Gloucester, later King Richard III
Dukedom of Bedford (5th creation) extinct, 1495	Dukedom of York (1st creation) merged in the Crown, 1461	Dukedom of Clarence (3rd creation) forfeit, 1478	Dukedom of Gloucester (3rd creation) merged in the Crown, 1483
Duke of Albany (2nd creation), 1458	Duke of Bedford (3rd creation), 1470	Duke of York (2nd creation), 1474; Duke of Norfolk (3rd creation), 1477	Duke of Bedford (4th creation), 1478
Alexander Stewart c. 1454–1485; 1st Duke of Albany	King James III; 1451/1452–1488	George Neville; 1457–1483; Duke of Bedford	King Henry VII; 1457–1509	Elizabeth of York; 1466–1503	Richard of Shrewsbury; 1473–1483; Duke of York, Duke of Norfolk	George of York; 1477–1479; Duke of Bedford
Dukedom of Bedford (3rd creation) forfeit, 1478	Dukedom of York (2nd creation) and Dukedom of Norfolk (3rd creation) extinct, 1483	Dukedom of Bedford (4th creation) extinct, 1479
Duke of Ross (1st creation), 1488	Duke of York (3rd creation), 1494	Duke of Somerset (3rd creation), 1499
John Stewart; 1482–1536; 2nd Duke of Albany	James Stewart; 1476–1504; Duke of Ross	King James IV; 1473–1513	Margaret Tudor; 1489–1541	Henry; 1491–1547; Duke of York, later King Henry VIII	Edmund Tudor; 1499–1500; Duke of Somerset (nominated but probably not invested)
Dukedom of Albany (2nd creation) extinct, 1536	Dukedom of Ross (1st creation) extinct, 1504	Dukedom of York (3rd creation) merged in the Crown, 1509	Dukedom of Somerset (3rd creation) extinct, 1500
Duke of Ross (2nd creation), 1514
King James V 1512–1542	Alexander Stewart; 1514–1515; Duke of Ross
Duke of Albany (3rd creation), 1565	Dukedom of Ross (2nd creation) extinct, 1515
Henry Stuart; 1546–1567; 1st Duke of Albany	Queen Mary; 1542–1587
James; 1566–1625; 2nd Duke of Albany, later King James VI & I
Dukedom of Albany (3rd creation) merged in the Crown, 1567
Duke of Albany (4th creation), 1604; Duke of York (4th creation), 1605	Duke of Kintyre and Lorne, 1602
Elizabeth Stuart; 1596–1662	Henry Frederick; 1594–1612	Charles; 1600–1649; Duke of Albany, Duke of York, later King Charles I	Robert Stuart; 1602; Duke of Kintyre and Lorne
Dukedom of Albany (4th creation), Dukedom of York (4th creation) merged in the Crown, 1625	Dukedom of Kintyre and Lorne extinct, 1602
Duke of York (5th creation) 1644; Duke of Albany (5th creation), 1660	Duke of Gloucester (4th creation), 1659
Sophia of Hanover; 1630–1714	James Stuart; 1633–1701; Duke of York, Duke of Albany, later King James VII & II	Henry; 1640–1660; Duke of Gloucester
Dukedom of Albany (5th creation) and Dukedom of York (5th creation) merged in the Crown, 1685	Dukedom of Gloucester (4th creation) extinct, 1660
Duke of York and Albany (1st creation), 1716	Duke of Cambridge (1st creation), 1664	Duke of Kendal (1st creation), 1666	Duke of Cambridge (2nd creation), 1667
King George I 1660–1727	Ernest Augustus; 1674–1728; Duke of York and Albany	Charles Stuart; 1660–1661 styled Duke of Cambridge	James Stuart; 1663–1667; Duke of Cambridge	Queen Anne; 1665–1714	Charles Stuart; 1666–1667 designated Duke of Kendal	Edgar Stuart; 1667–1671; Duke of Cambridge	Charles Stuart; 1677 styled Duke of Cambridge
Dukedom of York and Albany (1st creation) extinct, 1728	Dukedom of Cambridge (1st creation) extinct, 1667	Dukedom of Kendal (1st creation), extinct, 1667	Dukedom of Cambridge (2nd creation) extinct, 1671
Duke of Cambridge (3rd creation)
George; 1683–1760; Duke of Cambridge, later King George II	William; 1689–1700 styled Duke of Gloucester
Dukedom of Cambridge (3rd creation) merged with the Crown, 1727
Duke of Edinburgh (1st creation), 1726	Duke of Cumberland (3rd creation), 1726
Frederick; 1707–1751; 1st Duke of Edinburgh, styled Duke of Gloucester until created Duke of Edinburgh	William Augustus; 1721–1765; Duke of Cumberland
Dukedom of Cumberland (3rd creation) extinct, 1765
Duke of York and Albany (2nd creation), 1760	Duke of Gloucester and Edinburgh, 1764	Duke of Cumberland and Strathearn, 1766
George; 1738–1820; 2nd Duke of Edinburgh, later King George III	Edward; 1739–1767; Duke of York and Albany	William Henry; 1743–1805; 1st Duke of Gloucester and Edinburgh	Henry; 1745–1790; Duke of Cumberland and Strathearn
Dukedom of Edinburgh (1st creation), merged in the Crown, 1760	Dukedom of York and Albany (2nd creation) extinct, 1767	Dukedom of Cumberland and Strathearn extinct, 1790
Duke of York and Albany (3rd creation), 1784	Duke of Clarence and St Andrews, 1789	Duke of Kent and Strathearn, 1799	Duke of Cumberland and Teviotdale, 1799	Duke of Sussex (1st creation), 1801	Duke of Cambridge (4th creation), 1801
Frederick; 1763–1827; Duke of York and Albany	William Henry; 1765–1837, Duke of Clarence and St Andrews, later King William IV	Edward; 1767–1820; Duke of Kent and Strathearn	Ernest Augustus; 1771–1851; King of Hanover, 1st Duke of Cumberland and Teviotdale	Augustus Frederick; 1773–1843; Duke of Sussex	Adolphus; 1774–1850; 1st Duke of Cambridge	Mary; 1776–1857	William Frederick; 1776–1834; 2nd Duke of Gloucester and Edinburgh
Dukedom of York and Albany (3rd creation) extinct, 1827	Dukedom of Clarence and St Andrews merged in the Crown, 1830	Dukedom of Kent and Strathearn extinct, 1820	Dukedom of Sussex (1st creation) extinct, 1843	Dukedom of Gloucester and Edinburgh extinct, 1834
Queen Victoria; 1819–1901	George V 1819–1878; King of Hanover, 2nd Duke of Cumberland and Teviotdale	George; 1819–1904; 2nd Duke of Cambridge	Mary Adelaide; 1833–1897
Dukedom of Cambridge (4th creation) extinct, 1904
Duke of Edinburgh (2nd creation), 1866	Duke of Connaught and Strathearn, 1874	Duke of Albany (6th creation), 1881
King Edward VII; 1841–1910	Ernest Augustus; 1845–1923; 3rd Duke of Cumberland and Teviotdale	Alice; 1843–1878	Alfred Ernest Albert; 1844–1900; Duke of Edinburgh	Arthur; 1850–1942; 1st Duke of Connaught and Strathearn	Leopold; 1853–1884; 1st Duke of Albany
Dukedom of Cumberland and Teviotdale forfeit, 1919	Dukedom of Edinburgh (2nd creation) extinct, 1900
Duke of Clarence and Avondale, 1890	Duke of York (6th creation), 1892
Albert Victor; 1864–1892; Duke of Clarence and Avondale	George; 1865–1936; Duke of York, later King George V	Mary of Teck; 1867–1953	Victoria of Hesse and by Rhine; 1863–1950	Arthur of Connaught; 1883–1938
Dukedom of Clarence and Avondale extinct, 1892	Dukedom of York (6th creation) merged in the Crown, 1910
Duke of Windsor, 1937	Duke of York (7th creation), 1920	Duke of Kent (2nd creation), 1934	Duke of Gloucester (5th creation), 1928
King Edward VIII; 1894–1972; Later Duke of Windsor	Albert; 1895–1952; Duke of York, later King George VI	Alice of Battenberg; 1885–1969	George; 1902–1942; 1st Duke of Kent	Henry; 1900–1974; 1st Duke of Gloucester	Alastair Arthur; 1914–1943; 2nd Duke of Connaught and Strathearn	Charles Edward; 1884–1954; 2nd Duke of Albany
Dukedom of Windsor extinct, 1972	Dukedom of York (7th creation) merged in the Crown, 1936	Dukedom of Connaught and Strathearn extinct, 1943	Dukedom of Albany (6th creation) forfeit, 1919
Duke of Edinburgh (3rd creation), 1947
Queen Elizabeth II; 1926–2022	Philip; 1921–2021; 1st Duke of Edinburgh	Edward b. 1935; 2nd Duke of Kent
Duke of York (8th creation), 1986 (revoked 2025)	Duke of Edinburgh (4th creation), 2023
Charles b. 1948; 2nd Duke of Edinburgh, later King Charles III	Andrew b. 1960; Duke of York	Edward b. 1964; Duke of Edinburgh	George Windsor b. 1962	Richard b. 1944; 2nd Duke of Gloucester
Dukedom of Edinburgh (3rd creation) merged in the Crown, 2022	No male heirs	Dukedom of Edinburgh (4th creation) is a life peerage and therefore not hereditary	Heir apparent to the Dukedom of Kent
Duke of Cambridge (5th creation), 2011	Duke of Sussex (2nd creation), 2018
William b. 1982; Duke of Cambridge	Harry b. 1984; Duke of Sussex	Edward Windsor b. 1988	Alexander Windsor b. 1974
Heir-apparent to the Dukedom of Gloucester
George of Wales b. 2013	Archie of Sussex b. 2019
Heir apparent to the Dukedom of Cambridge	Heir apparent to the Dukedom of Sussex
