= British prince =

Royal title in the United Kingdom

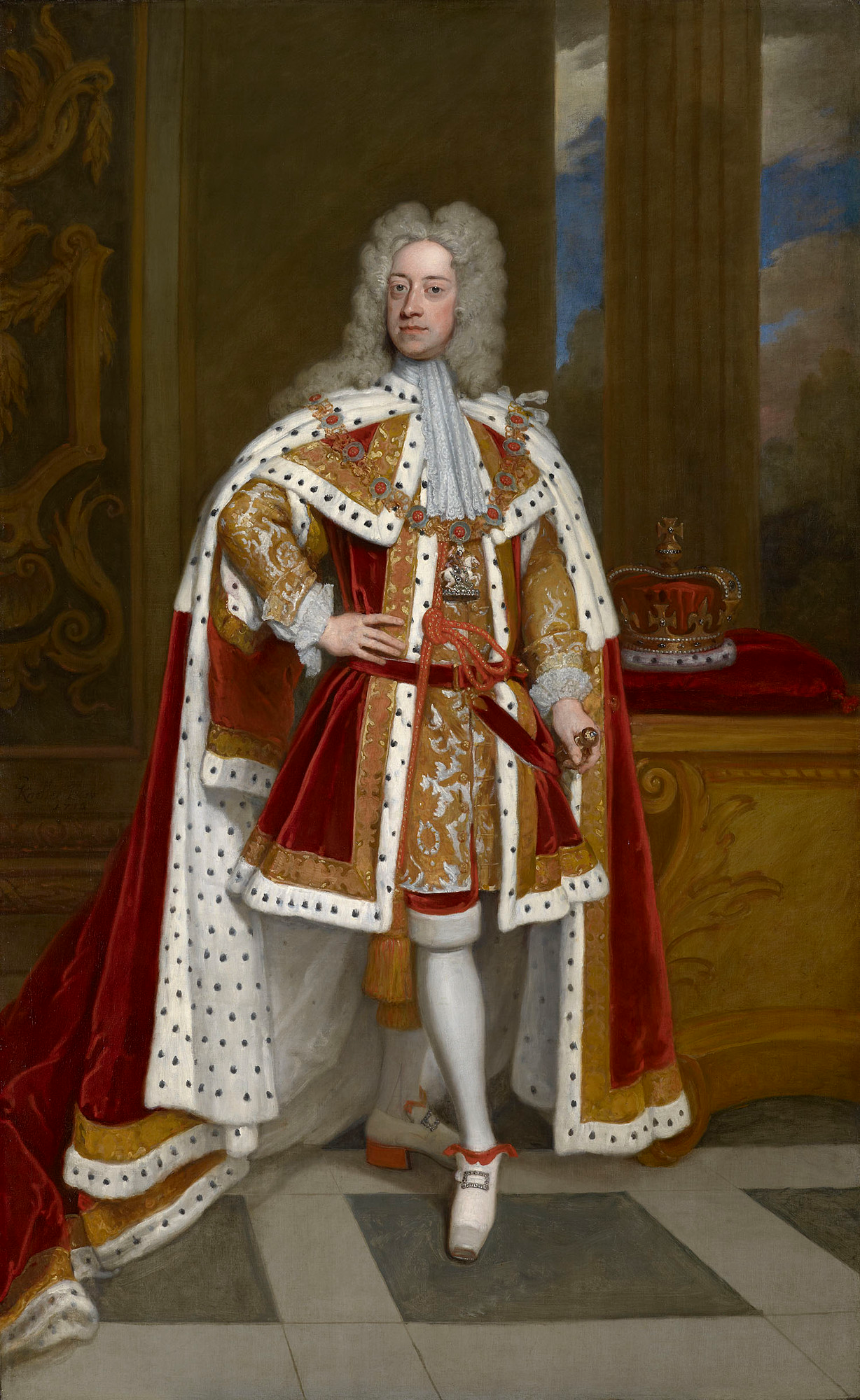
George Augustus, Prince of Wales (1716 portrait) was the first British prince.

Prince of the United Kingdom of Great Britain and Northern Ireland is a royal title normally granted to sons and male-line grandsons of reigning and past British monarchs, plus consorts of female monarchs (by letters patent). The title is granted by the reigning monarch, who is the fount of all honours, through the issuing of letters patent.

Individuals holding the title of prince will usually also be granted the style of His Royal Highness (HRH).

When a British prince marries, his wife becomes a British princess; however, she is addressed by the feminine version of the husband's senior title on his behalf, either a princely title or a peerage. Traditionally, all wives of male members of the British royal family, the aristocracy, and members of the public take the style and title of their husbands. An example of this case is Princess Michael of Kent, the wife of King Charles III's first cousin once removed Prince Michael of Kent.

There is also the case when a princess of blood royal marries a British prince. She also becomes a princess by marriage and will be addressed in the same way. An example of this situation was the late Princess Alexandra, Duchess of Fife: when she married her mother's cousin, Prince Arthur of Connaught, she became Princess Arthur of Connaught, Duchess of Fife.

If a British prince has a peerage, then the princess is addressed by the feminine version of her husband's peer title; an example of this case is the wife of Prince William, who was officially styled His Royal Highness The Duke of Cornwall and Cambridge while his wife Catherine became Her Royal Highness The Duchess of Cornwall and Cambridge, omitting both the 'prince' and 'princess' titles and their first names. When William was then created Prince of Wales, that became the senior title held in his own right, and he and Catherine are styled His/Her Royal Highness The Prince/Princess of Wales.

== History ==
Before 1714, the title of prince and the style of HRH was not customary in usage. Sons and daughters of the sovereign were not automatically or traditionally called a prince or princess. An exception was the Prince of Wales, a title conferred on the eldest son of the sovereign since the reign of King Edward I of England. In the Kingdom of Scotland, even though an honorific principality was created by King James VI, the heir-apparent was only referred to as Duke of Rothesay. Some others include John, brother of King Richard I and later King John, who is sometimes called Prince John.

After the accession of King George I of Great Britain (the first monarch from the House of Hanover), it became customary for the sons of the sovereign and grandsons of the sovereign in the male line to be titled Prince and styled His Royal Highness (abbreviated HRH). Great-grandsons of the sovereign were princes styled His Highness (abbreviated HH).

- The first male-line great-grandchild of a British monarch was not born until 1776. In keeping with tradition, he was given the style of His Highness Prince William of Gloucester (later Prince William Frederick, Duke of Gloucester and Edinburgh). On 22 July 1816 when he married his cousin and daughter of King George III, he was granted the style His Royal Highness. His only surviving elder sister, Princess Sophia of Gloucester, was also elevated to Her Royal Highness style the following day. Prince William died in 1834 before the accession of Queen Victoria.
- The first of the second set of male-line great-grandchildren of a British monarch was born on 21 September 1845 as Prince Ernest Augustus. He was granted the style of His Royal Highness because he was a male-line grandson of the king of Hanover and heir to the heir of that kingdom.

Victoria issued letters patent in 1864 which formally confirmed the practice of calling children and male-line grandchildren Royal Highness with the titular dignity of Prince or Princess prefixed to their respective Christian names. The letters patent did not address the styling of great-grandchildren or further descendants as His/Her Highness or Prince or Princess.

Subsequent to 1864 some amendments regarding princes were made, with the issuance of specific letters patent changing the title and style of the following groups:

- In 1898, the children of Prince George, Duke of York, the eldest living son of the Prince of Wales, were customarily titled princes, with the style of Highness, as great-grandchildren of Victoria in the male line. With letters patent dated 28 May 1898, the Crown granted the children of the eldest son of any Prince of Wales the style of Royal Highness.
- In 1914, the children of Ernest Augustus, Duke of Brunswick, a great-great-grandchild of George III, were granted the title of prince and the style Highness by King George V, in letters patent dated 17 June 1914.
- In 1917, George V issued a royal proclamation, altering the name of the Royal House from the House of Saxe-Coburg-Gotha to the House of Windsor and the discontinuance of the usage of the German titles of Duke of Saxony, Prince of Saxe-Coburg and Gotha and the like.
- Later that year, letters patent altered the rights to the title prince and the style Royal Highness. These letters patent, dated 30 November 1917, stated that "the children of any Sovereign of these Realms and the children of the sons of any such Sovereign (as per the above Letters Patent of 1864) and the eldest living son of the eldest son of the Prince of Wales (a modification of the Letters Patent of 1898) shall have and at all times hold and enjoy the style, title or attribute of Royal Highness with their titular dignity of Prince or Princess prefixed to their respective Christian names or with their other titles of honour". It was also decreed in these letters that "grandchildren of the sons of any such Sovereign in the direct male line ... shall have and enjoy in all occasions the style and title enjoyed by the children of Dukes of these Our Realms" (i.e., Lord or Lady before their Christian name). In addition the letters stated save as aforesaid the style title or attribute of Royal Highness, Highness or Serene Highness and the titular dignity of Prince or Princess shall not henceforth be assumed or borne by any descendant of any Sovereign of these Realms.

Both the proclamation and the letters patent of 1917 remain in force today, excepting a few amendments and creations noted.

- However, the former reigning Duke of Brunswick, head of the House of Hanover, refused to recognise the letters depriving his children of the British and Irish princely titles, and in 1931, he issued a decree, in the capacity of the head of the House of Hanover and senior male-line descendant of George III, purporting to state that the members of the former Hanoverian royal family would continue to bear the title of Prince (or Princess) of Great Britain and Ireland with the style of Royal Highness. This title and style remains in use to this day by his descendants, including the current head of the House of Hanover, Prince Ernst August. This decree is not legally recognised in the United Kingdom or Ireland, and the titles are used as titles of pretence. Since, however, the Hanovers are born in the male line of George II, they were bound by the Royal Marriages Act 1772 until repealed in 2015. Thus, before his marriage to Princess Caroline of Monaco, Ernst August requested, and Queen Elizabeth II issued on 11 January 1999, an Order in Council: "My Lords, I do hereby declare My Consent to a Contract of Matrimony between His Royal Highness Prince Ernst August Albert of Hanover, Duke of Brunswick-Luneburg and Her Serene Highness Princess Caroline Louise Marguerite of Monaco..." Without the royal assent, the marriage would have been void in the United Kingdom.
- After the abdication crisis of 1936, King George VI issued letters patent (dated 27 May 1937) regranting his elder brother his style as son of a sovereign, whilst expressly denying the style of Royal Highness to his wife and descendants. The marriage, however, had no issue.
- On 22 October 1948, George VI issued letters patent allowing the children of his daughter Princess Elizabeth, Duchess of Edinburgh, and son-in-law Philip, Duke of Edinburgh, to assume princely titles and the style Royal Highness; they would not have been entitled to them ordinarily, as grandchildren in the female line, until their mother ascended the throne as Elizabeth II. Thus her son was styled HRH Prince Charles of Edinburgh until his mother's accession. Otherwise the children would have been styled Earl of Merioneth and Lady Anne Mountbatten, respectively.
- Elizabeth II issued letters patent, dated 22 February 1957, creating Philip, Duke of Edinburgh, a Prince of the United Kingdom of Great Britain and Northern Ireland. Prince Philip had been born a Prince of Greece and Denmark, titles he renounced upon going through the naturalisation process, unaware that he was already a British subject by virtue of the Sophia Naturalization Act 1705.
- On the wedding day of Prince Edward and Sophie Rhys-Jones, it was announced by Buckingham Palace that Elizabeth II, in agreement with their wishes, had declared that their children would be styled as children of an earl, and not as Prince/Princess of the United Kingdom with the style Royal Highness.
- On 31 December 2012, Elizabeth II declared that all the children of the eldest son of the Prince of Wales, at that time Prince William, Duke of Cambridge, would have the title Prince or Princess and the style Royal Highness. (Prince William's eldest son, born on 22 July 2013, was styled His Royal Highness Prince George of Cambridge, a right he had under the 1917 letters patent, as the eldest son's eldest son). Whereas, his daughter, born on 2 May 2015, was styled Her Royal Highness Princess Charlotte of Cambridge. And his second son, born on 23 April 2018, was styled His Royal Highness Prince Louis of Cambridge.
- On 3 November 2025, Charles III issued letters patent declaring that his brother, Andrew Mountbatten-Windsor, shall no longer be entitled to the style of Royal Highness and the dignity of Prince.

== Styles of British princes ==
Coronet of the heir apparent

Coronet of a son of a sovereign

Coronet of a son of the heir apparent

Coronet of a grandson of a sovereign
- Sovereign's heir apparent if Prince of Wales – HRH The Prince of Wales.
- Sovereign's sons (not Prince of Wales) with peerage – HRH The Prince X, Duke of Y (with Y being the territorial designation of their highest peerage), e.g., HRH The Prince Henry, Duke of Sussex.
- Sovereign's sons without peerage – HRH The Prince X, e.g., HRH The Prince John.
- Sovereign's male line grandsons with peerage – HRH Prince X, Duke of Y (with Y being the territorial designation of their highest title), e.g., HRH Prince Edward, Duke of Kent.
- Sovereign's male line grandsons without peerage – HRH Prince X of Y (with Y being the territorial designation of their father's highest title), e.g., HRH Prince Michael of Kent.
- Sovereign's great-grandsons whose father is the oldest son of the heir apparent – HRH Prince X of Y (with Y being the territorial designation of their father's highest title), e.g., HRH Prince George of Cambridge before 2022.

== List of British princes since 1714 ==
The male-line descendants of Ernest Augustus, Duke of Brunswick, head of the House of Hanover bear the title Prince or Princess of the United Kingdom with the style of Royal Highness as a secondary title of pretence.

Of the 58 British princes listed here, two are spouses of a reigning queen, eight lost their title after World War I, and one lost title in 2025.

† – In letters patent dated 20 November 1917, King George V restricted the title of Prince to the children of the sovereign, the children of the sovereign's sons, and the eldest living son of the eldest son of the Prince of Wales.

‡ – By an Order in Council dated 28 March 1919, as authorised by the Titles Deprivation Act 1917, King George V suspended the British peerage titles and honours of those who sided with Germany in World War I.

List of British Princes
Full name	Arms	Lifespan	Royal lineage	Right	Notes
George Augustus later, King George II		1683–1760	Only son of King George I	Created Prince by the sovereign	Duke of Cambridge – 1707; Created Prince – 1714; Duke of Cornwall & Duke of Rothesay – 1714; Prince of Wales – 1714; King of Great Britain and King of Ireland from 11 June 1727; Concurrently Duke of Brunswick-Lüneburg (Hanover) and Archtreasurer and Prince-elector of the Holy Roman Empire.
Frederick Louis		1707–1751	1st son of King George II	Created Prince by the sovereign	Created Prince – 1714; Duke of Edinburgh – 1726; Duke of Cornwall & Duke of Rothesay – 1727; Prince of Wales from 8 January 1729.
George William		1717–1718	2nd son of King George II	Prince from birth	Prince of Great Britain from birth (died age three months).
William Augustus		1721–1765	3rd son of King George II	Prince from birth	Duke of Cumberland from 27 July 1726.
George William Frederick later, King George III		1738–1820	1st son of Frederick Louis; Grandson of King George II	Prince from birth	Duke of Edinburgh – 1751; Prince of Wales – 1751; King of Great Britain and King of Ireland from 25 October 1760 until the union of these two realms on 1 January 1801, after which he was King of the United Kingdom of Great Britain and Ireland; Concurrently Duke and prince-elector of Brunswick-Lüneburg ("Hanover") in the Holy Roman Empire until his promotion to King of Hanover on 12 October 1814.
Edward Augustus		1739–1767	2nd son of Frederick Louis; Grandson of King George II	Prince from birth	Duke of York and Albany from 1 April 1760.
William Henry		1743–1805	3rd son of Frederick Louis; Grandson of King George II	Prince from birth	Duke of Gloucester and Edinburgh from 19 November 1764.
Henry Frederick		1745–1790	4th son of Frederick Louis; Grandson of King George II	Prince from birth	Duke of Cumberland and Strathearn from 22 October 1766.
Frederick William	(posthumous arms)	1750–1765	5th son of Frederick Louis; Grandson of King George II	Prince from birth	Prince of Great Britain from birth (died age fifteen years).
George Augustus Frederick later, King George IV		1762–1830	1st son of King George III	Prince from birth	Duke of Cornwall & Duke of Rothesay from birth; Prince of Wales – 1762; Prince Regent – 1811; King of the United Kingdom of Great Britain and Ireland and king of Hanover from 29 January 1820.
Frederick Augustus		1763–1827	2nd son of King George III	Prince from birth	Duke of York and Albany from 27 November 1784.
William Henry later, King William IV		1765–1837	3rd son of King George III	Prince from birth	Duke of Clarence and St Andrews – 1789; King of the United Kingdom of Great Britain and Ireland and of Hanover from 26 June 1830.
Edward Augustus		1767–1820	4th son of King George III	Prince from birth	Father of Queen Victoria; Duke of Kent and Strathearn from 24 April 1799.
Ernest Augustus; Later, Ernest Augustus, King of Hanover		1771–1851	5th son of King George III	Prince from birth	Duke of Cumberland and Teviotdale from 23 April 1799; Additionally, King of Hanover from 20 June 1837.
Augustus Frederick		1773–1843	6th son of King George III	Prince from birth	Duke of Sussex from 17 November 1801.
Adolphus Frederick		1774–1850	7th son of King George III	Prince from birth	Duke of Cambridge from 17 November 1801.
Octavius		1779–1783	8th son of George III	Prince from birth	Prince of Great Britain from birth (died age four years).
Alfred		1780–1782	9th son of King George III	Prince from birth	Prince of Great Britain from birth (died age twenty-three months).
William Frederick		1776–1834	Only son of William Henry; Great-grandson of King George II	Prince from birth	Duke of Gloucester and Edinburgh from 22 July 1816.
George Frederick Alexander Charles Ernest Augustus; Later, George V, King of Hanover		1819–1878	Only son of Ernest Augustus; Grandson of King George III	Prince from birth	Duke of Cumberland and Teviotdale from 18 November 1851; Additionally, King of Hanover from 18 November 1851 until deposed on 20 September 1866.
George William Frederick Charles		1819–1904	Only son of Adolphus Frederick; Grandson of King George III	Prince from birth	Duke of Cambridge from 8 July 1850; Additionally, Prince of Hanover from birth.
Francis Albert Augustus Charles Emmanuel		1819–1861	Husband of Queen Victoria	Created Prince by the sovereign	Prince of Saxe-Coburg-Saalfeld (later, Saxe-Coburg and Gotha) from birth; Prince Consort of the United Kingdom from 25 June 1857.
Albert Edward; Later, King Edward VII		1841–1910	1st son of Queen Victoria	Prince from birth	Duke of Cornwall & Duke of Rothesay from birth; Prince of Wales – 1841; King of the United Kingdom of Great Britain and Ireland, the British Dominions and Emperor of India from 22 January 1901.
Alfred Ernest Albert		1844–1900	2nd son of Queen Victoria	Prince from birth	Duke of Edinburgh from 24 May 1866; Additionally, reigning Duke of Saxe-Coburg and Gotha from 23 August 1893.
Arthur William Patrick Albert		1850–1942	3rd son of Queen Victoria	Prince from birth	Duke of Connaught and Strathearn from 24 May 1874.
Leopold George Duncan Albert		1853–1884	4th son of Queen Victoria	Prince from birth	Duke of Albany from 24 May 1881.
Ernest Augustus William Adolphus George Frederick		1845–1923	Only son of George Frederick Alexander Charles Ernest Augustus; Great-grandson of King George III	Prince from birth	Prince until 20 November 1917†; Duke of Cumberland and Teviotdale from 28 March 1878 until 28 March 1919‡; Additionally, Prince of Hanover from birth; Head of the House of Hanover from 28 March 1878; Heir to the title Duke of Brunswick from 18 October 1884 until 24 October 1913, when he renounced his succession rights.
Albert Victor Christian Edward		1864–1892	1st son of King Edward VII	Prince from birth	Duke of Clarence and Avondale from 24 May 1890.
George Frederick Ernest Albert; Later, King George V		1865–1936	2nd son of King Edward VII	Prince from birth	Duke of York – 1892; Duke of Cornwall & Duke of Rothesay – 1901; Prince of Wales – 1901; King of the United Kingdom and the British Dominions, and Emperor of India, from 6 May 1910.
Alexander John Charles Albert		1871–1871	3rd son of King Edward VII	Prince from birth	Prince from birth (died age one day).
Alfred Alexander William Ernest Albert		1874–1899	Only son of Alfred Ernest Albert; Grandson of Queen Victoria	Prince from birth	Additionally, Prince of Saxe-Coburg and Gotha.
Arthur Frederick Patrick Albert		1883–1938	Only son of Arthur William Patrick Albert; Grandson of Queen Victoria	Prince from birth	
Carl Eduard Georg Albert Leopold		1884–1954	Only son of Leopold George Duncan Albert; Grandson of Queen Victoria	Prince from birth	Duke of Albany from birth until 28 March 1919‡; Additionally, reigning Duke of Saxe-Coburg and Gotha from 30 July 1900 until 14 November 1918, following the abolition of the German monarchy.
Georg Wilhelm Christian Albert Edward Alexander Friedrich Waldemar Ernst Adolf		1880–1912	1st son of Ernest Augustus William Adolphus George Frederick; Great-Great-grandson of King George III	Prince from birth	Additionally, Prince of Hanover from birth.
Christian Friedrich Wilhelm Georg Peter Waldemar		1885–1901	2nd son of Ernest Augustus William Adolphus George Frederick; Great-great-grandson of King George III	Prince from birth	Additionally, Prince of Hanover from birth.
Ernst August Christian Georg		1887–1953	3rd son of Ernest Augustus William Adolphus George Frederick; Great-great-grandson of King George III	Prince from birth	Prince until 20 November 1917.†; Additionally, Prince of Hanover from birth; Duke of Brunswick from 1 November 1913 until the 8 November 1918 abolition of the German monarchy; Head of the House of Hanover from 30 January 1923.
Edward Albert Christian George Andrew Patrick David later, King Edward VIII		1894–1972	1st son of King George V	Prince from birth	Prince until 20 January 1936 and again after 11 December 1936; Duke of Cornwall & Duke of Rothesay – 1910; Prince of Wales – 1910; King of the United Kingdom and the British Dominions and Emperor of India from 20 January 1936 until his abdication 11 December 1936; Duke of Windsor from 8 March 1937; Additionally, Prince of Saxe-Coburg and Gotha from birth until 1917.
Albert Frederick Arthur George later, King George VI		1895–1952	2nd son of King George V	Prince from birth	Duke of York – 4 June 1920; King of the United Kingdom and the British Dominions from 11 December 1936 until his death; Emperor of India from 11 December 1936 until title renounced 14 August 1947.
Henry William Frederick Albert		1900–1974	3rd son of King George V	Prince from birth	Duke of Gloucester from 31 March 1928.
George Edward Alexander Edmund		1902–1942	4th son of King George V	Prince from birth	Duke of Kent from 12 October 1934.
John Charles Francis		1905–1919	5th son of King George V	Prince from birth	Prince from birth (died age thirteen years).
Alastair Arthur		1914–1943	Only son of Arthur Frederick Patrick Albert; Great-grandson of Queen Victoria	Prince from birth	Prince until 20 November 1917†; Duke of Connaught and Strathearn from 16 January 1942.
Johann Leopold William Albert Ferdinand Victor		1906–1972	1st son of Carl Eduard Georg Albert Leopold; Great-grandson of Queen Victoria	Prince from birth	Prince until 20 November 1917.†; Additionally, Prince of Saxe-Coburg and Gotha from birth.
Dietmar Hubertus Friedrich Wilhelm Philipp		1909–1943	2nd son of Carl Eduard Georg Albert Leopold; Great-grandson of Queen Victoria	Prince from birth	Prince until 20 November 1917.†; Additionally, Prince of Saxe-Coburg and Gotha from birth.
Ernst August Georg Wilhelm Christian Ludwig Franz Joseph Nikolaus Oskar		1914–1987	1st son of Ernst August Christian Georg; Great-great-great-grandson of King George III	Created Prince by the sovereign	Prince from 17 June 1914 until 20 November 1917.†; Additionally, Prince of Brunswick from birth; Head of the House of Hanover from 30 January 1953.
George Wilhelm Ernst August Friedrich Axel		1915–2006	2nd son of Ernst August Christian Georg; Great-great-great-grandson of King George III	Prince from birth	Prince until 20 November 1917†; Additionally, Prince of Brunswick from birth.
Philip		1921–2021	Husband of Queen Elizabeth II	Created Prince by the sovereign	Prince of Greece and Denmark from birth until renounced title 18 March 1947; Duke of Edinburgh 20 November 1947; Prince from 22 February 1957.
William Henry Andrew Frederick		1941–1972	1st son of Henry William Frederick Albert; Grandson of King George V	Prince from birth	
Richard Alexander Walter George		1944–present	2nd son of Henry William Frederick Albert; Grandson of King George V	Prince from birth	Duke of Gloucester since 10 June 1974.
Edward George Nicholas Paul Patrick		1935–present	1st son of George Edward Alexander Edmund; Grandson of King George V	Prince from birth	Duke of Kent since 25 August 1942.
Michael George Charles Franklin		1942–present	2nd son of George Edward Alexander Edmund; Grandson of King George V	Prince from birth	
Charles Philip Arthur George later, King Charles III		1948–present	1st son of Queen Elizabeth II	Prince from birth	Held the title 'Prince Charles of Edinburgh' from birth, Duke of Cornwall and Duke of Rothesay – 1952 to 8 September 2022; Prince of Wales – 26 July 1958 to 8 September 2022; Duke of Edinburgh – 9 April 2021 to 8 September 2022; King of the United Kingdom (and other Commonwealth Realms) since 8 September 2022.
Andrew Albert Christian Edward		1960–present	2nd son of Queen Elizabeth II	Prince from birth	Prince until 3 November 2025; styled Duke of York – 23 July 1986 to 30 October 2025 Thereafter styled Andrew Mountbatten-Windsor.
Edward Antony Richard Louis		1964–present	3rd son of Queen Elizabeth II	Prince from birth	Earl of Wessex since 19 June 1999; Earl of Forfar since 10 March 2019; Duke of Edinburgh since 10 March 2023.
William Arthur Philip Louis		1982–present	1st son of King Charles III	Prince from birth	Duke of Cambridge since 29 April 2011; Duke of Cornwall and Duke of Rothesay since 8 September 2022.; Prince of Wales since 9 September 2022.
Henry Charles Albert David		1984–present	2nd son of King Charles III	Prince from birth	Duke of Sussex since 19 May 2018.
James Alexander Philip Theo		2007–present	Only son of Edward Antony Richard Louis; Grandson of Queen Elizabeth II	Prince from birth	Styled as a duke's son since March 2023.; Styled as an earl's son from birth until March 2023 per his parents' wishes and the will of the sovereign (see his titles and styles).
George Alexander Louis		2013–present	1st son of William Arthur Philip Louis; Grandson of King Charles III	Prince from birth	Held the title 'Prince George of Cambridge' from birth until his grandfather's accession on 8 September 2022.; Held the title 'Prince George of Cornwall and Cambridge' from 8 September to 9 September 2022.; Holds the title 'Prince George of Wales'.
Louis Arthur Charles		2018–present	2nd son of William Arthur Philip Louis; Grandson of King Charles III	Prince from birth	Held the title 'Prince Louis of Cambridge' from birth until his grandfather's accession on 8 September 2022.; Held the title 'Prince Louis of Cornwall and Cambridge' from 8 September to 9 September 2022.; Holds the title 'Prince Louis of Wales'.
Archie Harrison		2019–present	Only son of Henry Charles Albert David; Grandson of King Charles III	Prince since the accession of his grandfather	Prince since 8 September 2022; Previously styled as Master Archie Mountbatten-Windsor from birth to March 2023 per his parents' wishes (see his titles and styles).; Holds the title 'Prince Archie of Sussex'.

== See also ==
- List of current British princes and princesses
- List of British monarchs
- List of peerages created for British princes
- Prince of Waterloo, a title in the Dutch and Belgian nobility, held by the Duke of Wellington

== Notes and references ==
=== References ===
- Velde, François. "Royal Styles and Titles of Great Britain: Documents".
