= Duke of York and Albany =

Dukedom in the Peerage of Great Britain

Dukedom of York and Albany
- Creation date: 29 June 1716
- Created by: George I
- Peerage: Peerage of Great Britain
- First holder: Ernest Augustus, Duke of York and Albany
- Last holder: Prince Frederick, Duke of York and Albany
- Subsidiary titles: Earl of Ulster
- Status: Extinct
- Extinction date: 5 January 1827

Duke of York and Albany was a title of nobility in the Peerage of Great Britain. The title was created three times during the 18th century and was usually given to the second son of British monarchs. The predecessor titles in the English and Scottish peerages were Duke of York and Duke of Albany.

== History ==
The individual dukedoms of York and of Albany had previously each been created several times in the Peerages of England and Scotland respectively. Each had become a traditional title for the second son of the monarch and had become united (but separately awarded) in the House of Stuart.

During the 18th century, the double dukedom of York and Albany was created three times in the Peerage of Great Britain. The title was first held by Duke Ernest Augustus of Brunswick-Lüneburg, Bishop of Osnabrück, the youngest brother of King George I. He died without issue.

The second creation of the Dukedom of York and Albany was for Prince Edward, younger brother of King George III. He also died without issue, having never married. The third and final creation of the Dukedom of York and Albany was for Prince Frederick Augustus, the second son of King George III. He served as Commander-in-Chief of the British Army for many years, and he was the original "grand old Duke of York" in the popular rhyme. He died without legitimate issues.

Each time the Dukedom of York and Albany was created, it had only one occupant, with that person dying without legitimate issue.

Queen Victoria granted the title Duke of Albany (single geographic designation) in 1881 to her fourth son, Prince Leopold, and the title Duke of York (single geographic designation) in 1892 to her eldest grandson (second but by then only living) Prince George, the future George V.

== List of Dukes of York and Albany ==
=== First creation (1716–1728) ===
| Duke | Portrait | Birth | Marriage(s) | Death | Succession | Arms |
|---|---|---|---|---|---|---|
| Prince Ernest Augustus; House of Hanover; 1716–1728 also Prince-Bishopric of Osnabrück (1715), Earl of Ulster (1716) | Ernest Augustus, Duke of York and Albany | 7 September 1674; Osnabrück; Son of Ernest Augustus, Elector of Hanover and Princess Sophia of the Palatinate | Never Married | 14 August 1728; Osnabrück aged 53 | The son of Ernest Augustus, Elector of Hanover; younger brother of George I | |
Prince Ernest died without issue; and all his titles became extinct on his death.

=== Second creation (1760–1767) ===
| Duke | Portrait | Birth | Marriage(s) | Death | Succession | Arms |
|---|---|---|---|---|---|---|
| Prince Edward; House of Hanover; 1760–1767 also Earl of Ulster (1760) | Prince Edward, Duke of York and Albany | 25 March 1739; Norfolk House; Son of Frederick, Prince of Wales and Princess Augusta of Saxe-Gotha-Altenburg | Never Married | 17 September 1767; Prince's Palace of Monaco aged 28 | The second son of Frederick, Prince of Wales; younger brother of George III | |
Prince Edward died without issue; and all his titles became extinct on his death.

=== Third creation (1784–1827) ===
| Duke | Portrait | Birth | Marriage(s) | Death | Succession | Arms |
|---|---|---|---|---|---|---|
| The Prince Frederick; House of Hanover; 1784–1827 also Prince-Bishopric of Osnabrück (1764-1803), Earl of Ulster (1784) | Prince Frederick, Duke of York and Albany | 16 August 1763; St James's Palace; Son of George III and Charlotte of Mecklenburg-Strelitz | Princess Frederica Charlotte of Prussia; 29 September 1791; No children | 5 January 1827; Rutland House aged 63 | The second son of George III | |
Prince Frederick died without legitimate issue, having separated from his only wife Princess Frederica Charlotte, but was rumoured to have fathered several illegitimate children; and all his titles became extinct on his death.

== Family tree ==
Peerages of Albany, Arklow, Inverness, Ulster and York family tree

Earl of Ulster (1st Irish creation), 1205
Hugh de Lacy c. 1176–1271; Earl of Ulster
Earl of Ulster (2nd Irish creation), 1264
Maud de Lacy | Walter de Burgh c. 1210–1271; 1st Earl of Ulster, 2nd Lord of Connaught
Richard Óg de Burgh; 1259–1326; 2nd Earl of Ulster
John de Burgh d. 1313
Robert II of Scotland; 1316–1390 | Edward III of England; 1312–1377 | William Donn de Burgh; 1312–1333; 3rd Earl of Ulster
Lionel of Antwerp; 1338–1368; Duke of Clarence, Earl of Ulster (jure uxoris) | Elizabeth de Burgh; 1332–1363; 4th Countess of Ulster suo jure
Duke of Albany (1st creation), 1398 | Duke of York (1st creation), 1385
Robert III of Scotland; 1337–1406 | Robert Stewart c. 1340–1420; 1st Duke of Albany | Edmund of Langley; 1341–1402; 1st Duke of York | Philippa of Clarence; 1355–1382; 5th Countess of Ulster
Murdoch Stewart; 1362–1425; 2nd Duke of Albany | Roger Mortimer; 1374–1398; 6th Earl of Ulster, Earl of March
Dukedom of Albany (1st creation) forfeit, 1425
Edward of Norwich; 1373–1415; 2nd Duke of York | Richard of Conisburgh; 1375–1415; Earl of Cambridge | Anne Mortimer; 1388–c. 1411 | Edmund Mortimer; 1391–1425; 7th Earl of Ulster, Earl of March
James I of Scotland; 1394–1437 | Richard of York; 1411–1460; 3rd Duke of York, 8th Earl of Ulster, Earl of March
James II of Scotland; 1430–1460 | Prince Edward; 1442–1483; 4th Duke of York, 9th Earl of Ulster, Earl of March; Later Edward IV of England
Dukedom of York (1st creation) and Earldom of Ulster (2nd Irish creation) merged in the Crown, 1461
Duke of Albany (2nd creation), 1458 | Duke of York (2nd creation), 1474
Alexander Stewart; 1454–1485; 1st Duke of Albany | James III of Scotland; 1451–1488 | Elizabeth of York; 1466–1503 | Richard of Shrewsbury; 1473–1483; Duke of York
Dukedom of Albany (2nd creation) forfeit, 1479 restored, 1482 forfeited, 1483 | Dukedom of York (2nd creation) extinct, 1483
Duke of Albany (2nd creation) restored, 1515 | Duke of York (3rd creation), 1494
John Stewart; 1484–1536; 2nd Duke of Albany | James IV of Scotland; 1473–1513 | Margaret Tudor; 1489–1541 | Prince Henry; 1491–1547; Duke of York; Later Henry VIII of England
Dukedom of Albany (2nd creation) extinct, 1536 | Dukedom of York (3rd creation) merged in the Crown, 1509
James V of Scotland; 1512–1542
Duke of Albany (3rd creation), 1565
Prince Arthur Stewart; 1541 styled Duke of Albany | Mary, Queen of Scots; 1542–1587 | Henry Stuart, Lord Darnley; 1545–1567; 1st Duke of Albany
Prince James; 1566–1625; 2nd Duke of Albany; Later James VI & I of Scotland and England
Dukedom of Albany (3rd creation) merged in the Crown, 1567
Duke of Albany (4th creation), 1604; Duke of York (4th creation), 1605
Henry Frederick; 1594–1612 | Elizabeth Stuart; 1596–1662 | Prince Charles; 1600–1649; Duke of Albany, Duke of York; Later Charles I of Scotland and England
Dukedoms of York (4th creation) and Albany (4th creation) merged in the Crown, 1625
Duke of York (5th creation) 1644; Earl of Ulster (3rd Irish creation), 1659; Duke of Albany (5th creation), 1660
Sophia of Hanover; 1630–1714 | Charles II of Scotland and England; 1630–1685 | James Stuart; 1633–1701; Duke of York, Duke of Albany, Earl of Ulster; Later James II of Scotland and England
Dukedoms of Albany (5th creation) and York (5th creation), and Earldom of Ulster (3rd Irish creation) merged in the Crown, 1685
Duke of York and Albany (1st creation) and Earl of Ulster (4th Irish creation), 1716
George I of Great Britain; 1660–1727 | Ernest Augustus; 1674–1728; Prince-Bishop of Osnabrück, Duke of York and Albany, Earl of Ulster
Dukedom of York and Albany (1st creation) and Earldom of Ulster (4th Irish creation) extinct, 1728
George II of Great Britain; 1683–1760
Prince Frederick Louis; 1707–1751; Duke of Gloucester, Duke of Edinburgh
Duke of York and Albany (2nd creation) and Earl of Ulster (5th Irish creation), 1760
George III of the United Kingdom; 1738–1820 | Prince Edward; 1739–1767; Duke of York and Albany
Dukedom of York and Albany (2nd creation) and Earldom of Ulster (5th Irish creation) extinct, 1767
Duke of York and Albany (3rd creation) and Earl of Ulster (6th Irish creation), 1784 | Earl of Inverness (1st creation), and Baron Arklow (1st creation), 1801
George IV of the United Kingdom; 1762–1830 | Prince Frederick; 1763–1827; Duke of York and Albany | Prince Edward; 1767–1820; Duke of Kent and Strathearn | Prince Augustus Frederick; 1773–1843; Duke of Sussex, Earl of Inverness and Baron Arklow
Dukedom of York and Albany (3rd creation) and Earldom of Ulster (6th Irish creation) extinct, 1827 | Earldom of Inverness and Barony Arklow extinct, 1843
Queen Victoria of the United Kingdom; 1819–1901
Earl of Ulster (1st UK creation), 1866 | Duke of Albany (6th creation), Earl of Clarence, and Baron Arklow (2nd creation), 1881
Edward VII of the United Kingdom; 1841–1910 | Prince Alfred Ernest Albert; 1844–1900; Duke of Edinburgh, Duke of Saxe-Coburg and Gotha, Earl of Ulster | Prince Leopold; 1853–1884; Duke of Saxe-Coburg and Gotha, 1st Duke of Albany, Earl of Clarence, and Baron Arklow
Earldom of Ulster (1st UK creation) extinct, 1900
Duke of York (6th creation), Earl of Inverness (2nd creation) and Baron Killarney (1st creation), 1892
Prince Albert Victor; 1864–1892; Duke of Clarence and Avondale | Prince George; 1865–1936; Duke of York, Earl of Inverness, and Baron Killarney; Later George V of the United Kingdom | Charles Edward; 1884–1954; Duke of Saxe-Coburg and Gotha, 2nd Duke of Albany, Earl of Clarence, and Baron Arklow
Dukedom of York (6th creation), Earldom of Inverness (2nd creation), Barony Killarney (1st creation) merged in the Crown, 1910 | Dukedom of Albany (6th creation) forfeit, 1919
Duke of York (7th creation), Earl of Inverness (3rd creation) and Baron Killarney (2nd creation), 1920 | Earl of Ulster (2nd UK creation), 1928
Edward VIII of the United Kingdom; 1894–1972; Duke of Windsor | Prince Albert; 1895–1952; Duke of York; Later George VI of the United Kingdom | Prince Henry; 1900–1974; Duke of Gloucester, 1st Earl of Ulster
Dukedom of York (7th creation), Earldom of Inverness (3rd creation), Barony Killarney (2nd creation) merged in the Crown, 1936
Elizabeth II of the United Kingdom; 1926–2022
Duke of York (8th creation), Earl of Inverness (4th creation) and Baron Killyleagh, 1986
Charles III of the United Kingdom b. 1948 | Andrew Mountbatten-Windsor b. 1960; Duke of York, Earl of Inverness, and Baron Killyleagh | Prince Richard b. 1944; Duke of Gloucester, 2nd Earl of Ulster
Alexander Windsor b. 1974 styled Earl of Ulster
Heir apparent to the Earldom of Ulster
