= Duke of Sussex =

Royal dukedom in the United Kingdom

Dukedom of Sussex
- Arms of Prince Harry, Duke of Sussex
- Creation date: 19 May 2018 (announced); 16 July 2018 (Letters Patent)
- Creation: Second
- Created by: Elizabeth II
- Peerage: Peerage of the United Kingdom
- First holder: Prince Augustus Frederick
- Present holder: Prince Harry
- Heir apparent: Prince Archie
- Remainder to: the 1st Duke's heirs male of the body lawfully begotten
- Subsidiary titles: Earl of Dumbarton; Baron Kilkeel
- Status: Extant

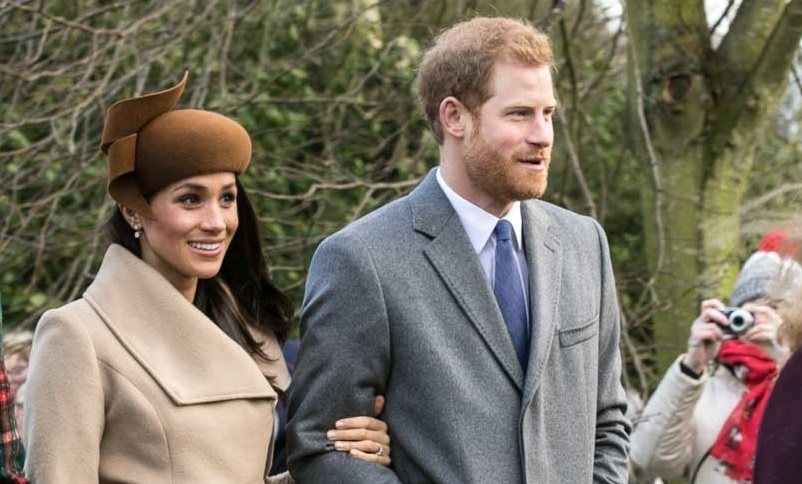
The Duke and Duchess of Sussex in 2017

Duke of Sussex is a substantive title, one of several royal dukedoms in the Peerage of the United Kingdom. It is a hereditary title of a specific rank of nobility in the British royal family. It has been created twice and takes its name from the historic county of Sussex in England.

First created in 1801, the title lapsed in 1843 but was revived when Queen Elizabeth II bestowed it on her grandson Prince Harry on 19 May 2018 just before his marriage to Meghan Markle, who then became the Duchess of Sussex.

== History ==
A title associated with Sussex first appeared with the Kingdom of Sussex, an Anglo-Saxon kingdom that was annexed by the Kingdom of Wessex around 827, that later became part of the Kingdom of England. In charters, Sussex's monarchs were sometimes referred to as ealdormen, or duces in Latin, which is sometimes translated as "dukes".

=== First creation, 1801 ===
The title of Duke of Sussex was first conferred on 24 November 1801 upon Prince Augustus Frederick, the sixth son of King George III. He was made Baron Arklow and Earl of Inverness at the same time, also in the Peerage of the United Kingdom. The title became extinct upon the Prince's death in 1843.

Although the Prince was survived by a son and daughter by Lady Augusta Murray, their marriage (purportedly solemnized at St George's Hanover Square Church, Westminster, in 1793) had been annulled for lack of royal permission under the Royal Marriages Act 1772, rendering the children illegitimate under English law and unable to inherit titles from their father. Both children by the annulled marriage died childless, rendering the issue of their inheritance moot.

On 2 May 1831, the Prince married a second time (and again in contravention of the Royal Marriages Act 1772) to Lady Cecilia Gore at Great Cumberland Place, London. They had no children. On 30 March 1840, she was given the title of Duchess of Inverness in her own right by Queen Victoria.

=== Second creation, 2018 ===
In 2018, the dukedom of Sussex was recreated and granted to Prince Harry, the grandson of Queen Elizabeth II and 5th great-grandnephew of the previous duke, to mark the occasion of his wedding. He married Meghan Markle on 19 May 2018; it was announced that day that he would become Duke of Sussex in England, with the subsidiary titles of Earl of Dumbarton in Scotland and Baron Kilkeel in Northern Ireland; Meghan Markle thereby became the first Duchess of Sussex. In 2019, an heir to the dukedom and the other titles, Prince Archie of Sussex, was born.

== Dukes of Sussex ==
=== 1801 creation ===
| Duke | Portrait | Birth | Marriage(s) | Death | Arms |
|---|---|---|---|---|---|
| Prince Augustus Frederick; House of Hanover; 1801–1843 also: Earl of Inverness and Baron Arklow (1801) | Prince Augustus Frederick | 27 January 1773; Buckingham House, London son of King George III and Queen Charlotte | 4 April 1793; Lady Augusta Murray; 2 children 2 May 1831; Lady Cecilia Underwood; No children | 21 April 1843; Kensington Palace, London aged 70 | |
Prince Augustus's first marriage to Lady Augusta Murray produced two children. However, due to the Royal Marriages Act 1772, the marriage was invalid (he had not asked for his father's approval to marry) and his children were thus illegitimate and could not succeed to his titles; so, accordingly, all his titles became extinct on his death.

=== 2018 creation ===
| Duke | Portrait | Birth | Marriage(s) | Death | Arms |
|---|---|---|---|---|---|
| Prince Harry; House of Windsor; 2018–present also: Earl of Dumbarton and Baron Kilkeel (2018) | Prince Harry | 15 September 1984; St Mary's Hospital, London son of King Charles III and Diana, Princess of Wales | 19 May 2018; Meghan Markle; 2 children | Living (age 42) | |

== Line of succession ==
- Prince Harry, Duke of Sussex (born 1984)
  - (1) Prince Archie of Sussex (born 2019)

== Family trees ==
Family tree of the Dukes of Sussex, Earls of Dumbarton, Earls of Inverness, Barons Kilkeel, Barons Arklow

George III; 1738–1820
Duke of Sussex (1st creation), Earl of Inverness (1st creation), and Baron Arklow (1st creation), 1801
Edward; 1767–1820; Duke of Kent and Strathearn | Augustus Frederick; 1773–1843; Duke of Sussex
Dukedom extinct, 1843
Queen Victoria; 1819–1901
Baron Arklow (2nd creation), 1881
Edward VII; 1841–1910 | Leopold; 1853–1884; Duke of Albany, Earl of Clarence, 1st Baron Arklow
Earl of Inverness (2nd creation), 1892
George Frederick Ernest Albert; 1865–1936; Earl of Inverness, later King George V | Charles Edward; 1884–1919; Duke of Albany, Earl of Clarence, 2nd Baron Arklow
Earldom of Inverness (2nd creation) merged with the crown, 1910 | Barony Arklow (2nd creation) forfeit, 1919
Earl of Inverness (3rd creation), 1920
Albert Frederick Arthur George; 1895–1952; Earl of Inverness, later King George VI
Earldom of Inverness (3rd creation) merged with the crown, 1936
Queen Elizabeth II; 1926–2022
Earl of Inverness (4th creation), 1986
Charles III b. 1948 | Andrew Mountbatten-Windsor b. 1960; Duke of York, Earl of Inverness, Baron Killyleagh
Earldom of Inverness is not inherited
Duke of Sussex (2nd creation), Earl of Dumbarton, Baron Kilkeel, 2018
Harry; Duke of Sussex, Earl of Dumbarton, Baron Kilkeel b. 1984
Prince Archie of Sussex b. 2019
Heir apparent

Family tree of British royal dukes

Includes dukes of: Albany, Albemarle, Bedford, Cambridge, Clarence, Connaught and Strathearn, Cumberland, Edinburgh, Gloucester, Gloucester and Edinburgh, Hereford, Kent, Kintyre and Lorne, Norfolk, Ross, Somerset, Sussex, Windsor, and York, but only when royally.

Non-royal dukes are not included; see Royal dukedoms in the United Kingdom.
Also not included are titles mandated for use by the heir apparent (Duke of Rothesay and the 1337 creation of the Duke of Cornwall), see Princes of Wales family tree.

King Robert II; 1316–1390 | King Edward III; 1312–1377
Duke of Albany (1st creation), 1398 | Duke of Clarence (1st creation), 1362 | Duke of York (1st creation), 1385
King Robert III c. 1337–1406 | Robert Stewart c. 1340–1420; 1st Duke of Albany | Edward the Black Prince; 1330–1376 | Lionel of Antwerp; 1338–1368; Duke of Clarence | John of Gaunt; 1340–1399 | Edmund; 1341–1402; 1st Duke of York
Dukedom of Clarence (1st creation) extinct, 1368
Duke of Cornwall (2nd creation), 1376 | Duke of Hereford, 1397 | Duke of Gloucester (1st creation), 1385
Murdoch Stewart c. 1362–1425; 2nd Duke of Albany | Richard of Bordeaux; 1367–1400; Duke of Cornwall, later King Richard II | Henry Bolingbroke; 1367–1413; Duke of Hereford, later King Henry IV | Thomas of Woodstock; 1355–1397; Duke of Gloucester
Dukedom of Albany (1st creation) forfeit, 1425 | Dukedom of Cornwall (2nd creation) merged in the crown, 1377 | Dukedom of Hereford merged in the crown, 1399 | Dukedom of Gloucester (1st creation) extinct, 1397
Duke of Clarence (2nd creation), 1412 | Duke of Bedford (1st & 2nd creations), 1414 | Duke of Gloucester (2nd creation), 1414 | Duke of Albemarle (Aumale) (1st creation), 1397
Thomas of Lancaster; 1387–1421; Duke of Clarence | John of Lancaster; 1389–1435; Duke of Bedford; Surrendered dukedom and then regranted, 1433 | Humphrey of Lancaster; 1390–1447; Duke of Gloucester | John Beaufort; 1373–1410 | Joan Beaufort c. 1379–1440 | Edward of Norwich c. 1373–1415; Duke of Aumale, 2nd Duke of York | Richard of Conisburgh; 1385–1415
Dukedom of Clarence (2nd creation) extinct, 1421 | Dukedom of Bedford (2nd creation) extinct, 1435 | Dukedom of Gloucester (2nd creation) extinct, 1447 | Dukedom of Albemarle (Aumale) (1st creation) forfeit, 1399
Duke of York (1st creation) restored, 1425; Duke of Cornwall (3rd creation), 1460
King James I 1394–1437 | Joan Beaufort c. 1404–1445 | Owen Tudor c. 1400–1461 | John Beaufort; 1404–1444 | Richard Neville; 1400–1460 | Cecily Neville; 1415–1495 | Richard of York; 1411–1460; 3rd Duke of York, Duke of Cornwall
Duke of Cornwall (3rd creation) extinct, 1460
Duke of Bedford (5th creation), 1485 | Duke of Clarence (3rd creation), 1461 | Duke of Gloucester (3rd creation), 1461
King James II; 1430–1460 | Jasper Tudor c. 1431–1495; Duke of Bedford | Edmund Tudor c. 1430–1456 | Lady Margaret Beaufort; 1443–1509 | John Neville c. 1431–1471 | Elizabeth Woodville c. 1437–1492 | Edward; 1442–1483; 4th Duke of York, later King Edward IV | George Plantagenet; 1449–1478; Duke of Clarence | Richard of York; 1452–1485; Duke of Gloucester, later King Richard III
Dukedom of Bedford (5th creation) extinct, 1495 | Dukedom of York (1st creation) merged in the Crown, 1461 | Dukedom of Clarence (3rd creation) forfeit, 1478 | Dukedom of Gloucester (3rd creation) merged in the Crown, 1483
Duke of Albany (2nd creation), 1458 | Duke of Bedford (3rd creation), 1470 | Duke of York (2nd creation), 1474; Duke of Norfolk (3rd creation), 1477 | Duke of Bedford (4th creation), 1478
Alexander Stewart c. 1454–1485; 1st Duke of Albany | King James III; 1451/1452–1488 | George Neville; 1457–1483; Duke of Bedford | King Henry VII; 1457–1509 | Elizabeth of York; 1466–1503 | Richard of Shrewsbury; 1473–1483; Duke of York, Duke of Norfolk | George of York; 1477–1479; Duke of Bedford
Dukedom of Bedford (3rd creation) forfeit, 1478 | Dukedom of York (2nd creation) and Dukedom of Norfolk (3rd creation) extinct, 1483 | Dukedom of Bedford (4th creation) extinct, 1479
Duke of Ross (1st creation), 1488 | Duke of York (3rd creation), 1494 | Duke of Somerset (3rd creation), 1499
John Stewart; 1482–1536; 2nd Duke of Albany | James Stewart; 1476–1504; Duke of Ross | King James IV; 1473–1513 | Margaret Tudor; 1489–1541 | Henry; 1491–1547; Duke of York, later King Henry VIII | Edmund Tudor; 1499–1500; Duke of Somerset (nominated but probably not invested)
Dukedom of Albany (2nd creation) extinct, 1536 | Dukedom of Ross (1st creation) extinct, 1504 | Dukedom of York (3rd creation) merged in the Crown, 1509 | Dukedom of Somerset (3rd creation) extinct, 1500
Duke of Ross (2nd creation), 1514
King James V 1512–1542 | Alexander Stewart; 1514–1515; Duke of Ross
Duke of Albany (3rd creation), 1565 | Dukedom of Ross (2nd creation) extinct, 1515
Henry Stuart; 1546–1567; 1st Duke of Albany | Queen Mary; 1542–1587
James; 1566–1625; 2nd Duke of Albany, later King James VI & I
Dukedom of Albany (3rd creation) merged in the Crown, 1567
Duke of Albany (4th creation), 1604; Duke of York (4th creation), 1605 | Duke of Kintyre and Lorne, 1602
Elizabeth Stuart; 1596–1662 | Henry Frederick; 1594–1612 | Charles; 1600–1649; Duke of Albany, Duke of York, later King Charles I | Robert Stuart; 1602; Duke of Kintyre and Lorne
Dukedom of Albany (4th creation), Dukedom of York (4th creation) merged in the Crown, 1625 | Dukedom of Kintyre and Lorne extinct, 1602
Duke of York (5th creation) 1644; Duke of Albany (5th creation), 1660 | Duke of Gloucester (4th creation), 1659
Sophia of Hanover; 1630–1714 | James Stuart; 1633–1701; Duke of York, Duke of Albany, later King James VII & II | Henry; 1640–1660; Duke of Gloucester
Dukedom of Albany (5th creation) and Dukedom of York (5th creation) merged in the Crown, 1685 | Dukedom of Gloucester (4th creation) extinct, 1660
Duke of York and Albany (1st creation), 1716 | Duke of Cambridge (1st creation), 1664 | Duke of Kendal (1st creation), 1666 | Duke of Cambridge (2nd creation), 1667
King George I 1660–1727 | Ernest Augustus; 1674–1728; Duke of York and Albany | Charles Stuart; 1660–1661 styled Duke of Cambridge | James Stuart; 1663–1667; Duke of Cambridge | Queen Anne; 1665–1714 | Charles Stuart; 1666–1667 designated Duke of Kendal | Edgar Stuart; 1667–1671; Duke of Cambridge | Charles Stuart; 1677 styled Duke of Cambridge
Dukedom of York and Albany (1st creation) extinct, 1728 | Dukedom of Cambridge (1st creation) extinct, 1667 | Dukedom of Kendal (1st creation), extinct, 1667 | Dukedom of Cambridge (2nd creation) extinct, 1671
Duke of Cambridge (3rd creation)
George; 1683–1760; Duke of Cambridge, later King George II | William; 1689–1700 styled Duke of Gloucester
Dukedom of Cambridge (3rd creation) merged with the Crown, 1727
Duke of Edinburgh (1st creation), 1726 | Duke of Cumberland (3rd creation), 1726
Frederick; 1707–1751; 1st Duke of Edinburgh, styled Duke of Gloucester until created Duke of Edinburgh | William Augustus; 1721–1765; Duke of Cumberland
Dukedom of Cumberland (3rd creation) extinct, 1765
Duke of York and Albany (2nd creation), 1760 | Duke of Gloucester and Edinburgh, 1764 | Duke of Cumberland and Strathearn, 1766
George; 1738–1820; 2nd Duke of Edinburgh, later King George III | Edward; 1739–1767; Duke of York and Albany | William Henry; 1743–1805; 1st Duke of Gloucester and Edinburgh | Henry; 1745–1790; Duke of Cumberland and Strathearn
Dukedom of Edinburgh (1st creation), merged in the Crown, 1760 | Dukedom of York and Albany (2nd creation) extinct, 1767 | Dukedom of Cumberland and Strathearn extinct, 1790
Duke of York and Albany (3rd creation), 1784 | Duke of Clarence and St Andrews, 1789 | Duke of Kent and Strathearn, 1799 | Duke of Cumberland and Teviotdale, 1799 | Duke of Sussex (1st creation), 1801 | Duke of Cambridge (4th creation), 1801
Frederick; 1763–1827; Duke of York and Albany | William Henry; 1765–1837, Duke of Clarence and St Andrews, later King William IV | Edward; 1767–1820; Duke of Kent and Strathearn | Ernest Augustus; 1771–1851; King of Hanover, 1st Duke of Cumberland and Teviotdale | Augustus Frederick; 1773–1843; Duke of Sussex | Adolphus; 1774–1850; 1st Duke of Cambridge | Mary; 1776–1857 | William Frederick; 1776–1834; 2nd Duke of Gloucester and Edinburgh
Dukedom of York and Albany (3rd creation) extinct, 1827 | Dukedom of Clarence and St Andrews merged in the Crown, 1830 | Dukedom of Kent and Strathearn extinct, 1820 | Dukedom of Sussex (1st creation) extinct, 1843 | Dukedom of Gloucester and Edinburgh extinct, 1834
Queen Victoria; 1819–1901 | George V 1819–1878; King of Hanover, 2nd Duke of Cumberland and Teviotdale | George; 1819–1904; 2nd Duke of Cambridge | Mary Adelaide; 1833–1897
Dukedom of Cambridge (4th creation) extinct, 1904
Duke of Edinburgh (2nd creation), 1866 | Duke of Connaught and Strathearn, 1874 | Duke of Albany (6th creation), 1881
King Edward VII; 1841–1910 | Ernest Augustus; 1845–1923; 3rd Duke of Cumberland and Teviotdale | Alice; 1843–1878 | Alfred Ernest Albert; 1844–1900; Duke of Edinburgh | Arthur; 1850–1942; 1st Duke of Connaught and Strathearn | Leopold; 1853–1884; 1st Duke of Albany
Dukedom of Cumberland and Teviotdale forfeit, 1919 | Dukedom of Edinburgh (2nd creation) extinct, 1900
Duke of Clarence and Avondale, 1890 | Duke of York (6th creation), 1892
Albert Victor; 1864–1892; Duke of Clarence and Avondale | George; 1865–1936; Duke of York, later King George V | Mary of Teck; 1867–1953 | Victoria of Hesse and by Rhine; 1863–1950 | Arthur of Connaught; 1883–1938
Dukedom of Clarence and Avondale extinct, 1892 | Dukedom of York (6th creation) merged in the Crown, 1910
Duke of Windsor, 1937 | Duke of York (7th creation), 1920 | Duke of Kent (2nd creation), 1934 | Duke of Gloucester (5th creation), 1928
King Edward VIII; 1894–1972; Later Duke of Windsor | Albert; 1895–1952; Duke of York, later King George VI | Alice of Battenberg; 1885–1969 | George; 1902–1942; 1st Duke of Kent | Henry; 1900–1974; 1st Duke of Gloucester | Alastair Arthur; 1914–1943; 2nd Duke of Connaught and Strathearn | Charles Edward; 1884–1954; 2nd Duke of Albany
Dukedom of Windsor extinct, 1972 | Dukedom of York (7th creation) merged in the Crown, 1936 | Dukedom of Connaught and Strathearn extinct, 1943 | Dukedom of Albany (6th creation) forfeit, 1919
Duke of Edinburgh (3rd creation), 1947
Queen Elizabeth II; 1926–2022 | Philip; 1921–2021; 1st Duke of Edinburgh | Edward b. 1935; 2nd Duke of Kent
Duke of York (8th creation), 1986 (revoked 2025) | Duke of Edinburgh (4th creation), 2023
Charles b. 1948; 2nd Duke of Edinburgh, later King Charles III | Andrew b. 1960; Duke of York | Edward b. 1964; Duke of Edinburgh | George Windsor b. 1962 | Richard b. 1944; 2nd Duke of Gloucester
Dukedom of Edinburgh (3rd creation) merged in the Crown, 2022 | No male heirs | Dukedom of Edinburgh (4th creation) is a life peerage and therefore not hereditary | Heir apparent to the Dukedom of Kent
Duke of Cambridge (5th creation), 2011 | Duke of Sussex (2nd creation), 2018
William b. 1982; Duke of Cambridge | Harry b. 1984; Duke of Sussex | Edward Windsor b. 1988 | Alexander Windsor b. 1974
Heir-apparent to the Dukedom of Gloucester
George of Wales b. 2013 | Archie of Sussex b. 2019
Heir apparent to the Dukedom of Cambridge | Heir apparent to the Dukedom of Sussex

== See also ==
- Earl of Sussex
