= Cecilia Underwood, Duchess of Inverness =

British aristocrat (c. 1789 – 1873)

Her Grace The Duchess of Inverness
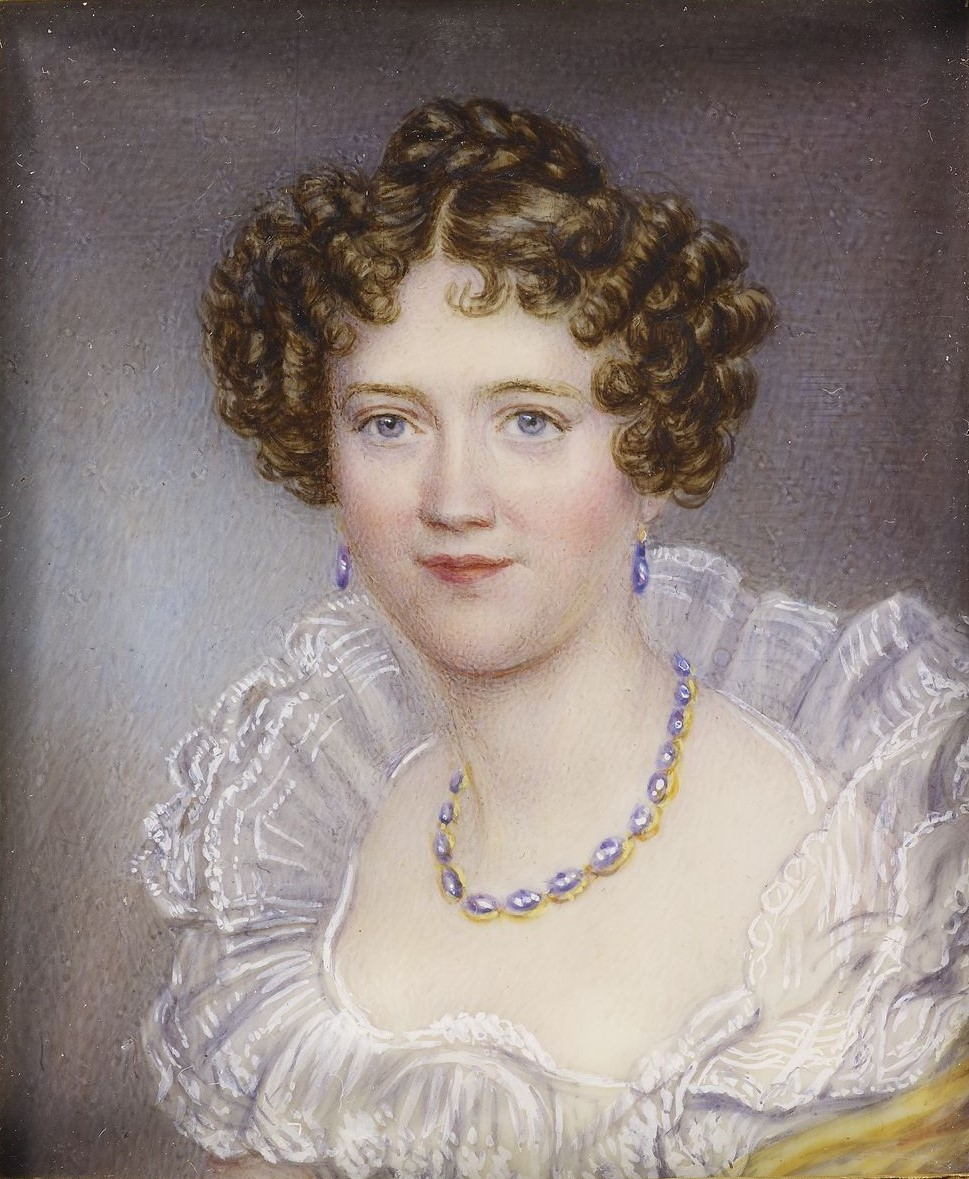
- 1874 portrait
- Born: Lady Cecilia Letitia Gore c. 1789
- Died: 1 August 1873; Kensington Palace, London
- Buried: Kensal Green Cemetery, London
- Spouses: Sir George Buggin (m. 1815; died 1825) Prince Augustus Frederick, Duke of Sussex (m. 1831; died 1843)
- Parents: Arthur Gore, 2nd Earl of Arran; Elizabeth Underwood

Cecilia Underwood, Duchess of Inverness (née Gore and formerly Buggin; c. 1789 – 1 August 1873) was the second wife of Prince Augustus Frederick, Duke of Sussex (sixth son of King George III). Despite marrying, like the Prince's first marriage, their union was in contravention of the Royal Marriages Act 1772 and as such was considered legally void. Consequently, she could not be styled as the Duchess of Sussex or a Princess. She was created Duchess of Inverness, in her own right, by Queen Victoria, on 10 April 1840.

== Early life ==
Cecilia was born around 1789. Her father, Arthur Gore, was the 2nd Earl of Arran, a prominent member of 'the Ascendancy', the Anglo-Irish aristocracy; her mother was Elizabeth née Underwood. She was styled Lady Cecilia Gore at birth, the courtesy title of a daughter of an earl.

== Marriages ==
Lady Cecilia's first marriage was to Sir George Buggin, in May 1815. The marriage produced no children and Sir George died on 12 April 1825.

She later married Prince Augustus Frederick, Duke of Sussex, the sixth son of George III, at Great Cumberland Place, London, on 2 May 1831. The Duke of Sussex had already married Lady Augusta Murray in 1793, but that marriage was annulled in 1794 as it contravened the Royal Marriages Act 1772, which required that all members of the British Royal Family seek permission of the sovereign before marriage. However the Duke of Sussex's second marriage also contravened the Act for failure to seek permission, making it also legally void.

== Duchess of Inverness ==
As the marriage was not lawful, Lady Cecilia could not take the style and title Her Royal Highness The Duchess of Sussex. Instead, she assumed the name "Underwood", her mother's maiden name, by Royal Licence and was known as Lady Cecilia Underwood. The couple resided at the Duke's apartments in Kensington Palace.

However, Lady Cecilia was not accepted as a full member of the British royal family. Royal protocol restricted Lady Cecilia from being present at any functions attended by other members of the Royal Family, as she was unable to take a seat beside her husband due to her lower rank. To compensate for this, in 1840 Queen Victoria created her Duchess of Inverness, in her own right, with remainder to the heirs male of her body lawfully begotten. This recognised her husband's subsidiary title of Earl of Inverness.

== Death ==
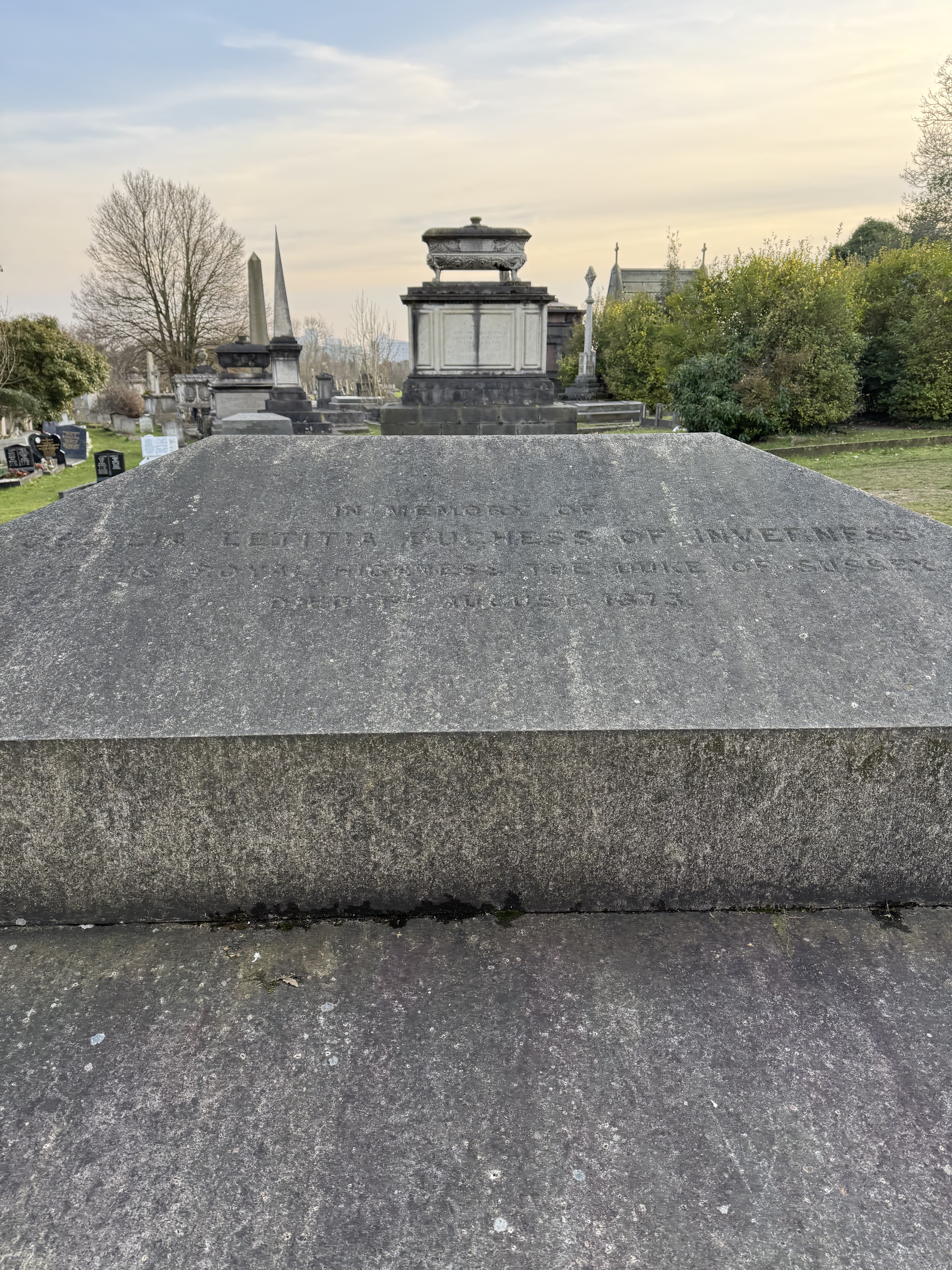
Her tomb at Kensal Green Cemetery, London

The Duke of Sussex died in April 1843 at Kensington Palace and was buried at Kensal Green Cemetery. The Duchess of Inverness continued to reside at Kensington Palace until her death thirty years later in August 1873. She was buried next to her second husband. She left no issue and the dukedom became extinct on her death.

== Portrayals ==
Lady Cecilia is portrayed briefly in the 2016 ITV series Victoria, Episode 6 "The Queen's Husband" by Daisy Goodwin, creator of the series and its main writer.

== Arms ==
Coat of arms of Cecilia Underwood, Duchess of Inverness
Coronet Coronet of a Duke Escutcheon Quarterly 1st & 4th Azure on a fess Ermine between three annulets Or a lion passant Azure (Underwood) 2nd & 3rd Gules a fess between three cross crosslets fitchee Or (Gore).

Peerage of the United Kingdom
New creation	Duchess of Inverness; 1840–1873	Extinct
