= Earl of Dumbarton =

Earldom in the Peerage of the United Kingdom

Earldom of Dumbarton
- Arms of Prince Harry, the present Earl of Dumbarton
- Creation date: 9 March 1675
- Creation: Second
- Created by: Elizabeth II
- Peerage: Peerage of the United Kingdom
- First holder: Lord George Douglas
- Present holder: Prince Harry
- Heir apparent: Prince Archie of Sussex
- Remainder to: the 1st Earl's heirs male of the body lawfully begotten
- Status: Extant

Earl of Dumbarton is a title in the peerage of the United Kingdom, referring to Dumbarton in the area West Dunbartonshire, Scotland. The title has been created twice, once in the Peerage of Scotland in 1675 and once in the Peerage of the United Kingdom in 2018.

== History ==
The title was first created in the Peerage of Scotland on 9 March 1675 for Lord George Douglas, son of the Marquess of Douglas and younger brother of the Earl of Selkirk, for services fighting in the Franco-Dutch War. Lord Dumbarton was also created Lord Douglas of Ettrick. He was married to Anne Douglas (née Wheatley), the first Countess of Dumbarton, who was the sister of Catherine Fitzroy, Duchess of Northumberland. Following the death of their only son, the unmarried second Earl, both titles became extinct on 7 January 1749.

On 16 July 2018, the title was recreated in the Peerage of the United Kingdom by Queen Elizabeth II as one of the two subsidiary titles for her grandson Prince Harry, Duke of Sussex, on the occasion of his wedding, when he was also created Baron Kilkeel. The title was announced on 19 May 2018. The heir to the earldom is his son, Prince Archie of Sussex.

=== Earls of Dumbarton, first creation, 1675 ===
Earl	Portrait	Birth	Marriage(s)	Death
George Douglas; 1675—1692	George Douglas	1635; Douglas Castle son of William Douglas, 1st Marquess of Douglas, and Lady Mary Gordon	Anne Wheatley (died 1691); 1 child	1692; St-Germain-en-Laye, Paris, France aged 56–57 years
George Douglas; 1692—1749		1687 son of George Douglas, 1st Earl of Dumbarton, and Anne Wheatley (died 1691)	Unmarried	1749; Douai, France aged 61–62 years

=== Earl of Dumbarton, second creation, 2018 ===
Earl	Portrait	Birth	Marriage(s)	Death
Prince Harry; House of Windsor; 2018–present also: Duke of Sussex and Baron Kilkeel (2018)	Prince Harry	15 September 1984; St Mary's Hospital, London son of Charles, Prince of Wales, and Lady Diana Spencer	Rachel Meghan Markle; 19 May 2018; 2 children	Living

== Line of succession ==
Heraldic banner of Prince Harry, Duke of Sussex and Earl of Dumbarton

- Prince Harry, Earl of Dumbarton (b. 1984)
  - (1) Prince Archie of Sussex (b. 2019)
