= Baron Kilkeel =

Barony in the Peerage of the United Kingdom

Barony of Kilkeel
- Arms of Prince Harry, Duke of Sussex, the present Baron Kilkeel
- Creation date: 19 May 2018 (announced); 16 July 2018 (Letters Patent)
- Creation: First
- Created by: Elizabeth II
- Peerage: Peerage of the United Kingdom
- Present holder: Prince Harry
- Heir apparent: Prince Archie of Sussex
- Remainder to: the 1st Baron's heirs male of the body lawfully begotten
- Status: Extant

Baron Kilkeel is a title in the Peerage of the United Kingdom. It was created on 19 May 2018 by Queen Elizabeth II as a subsidiary title for her grandson Prince Harry, Duke of Sussex, upon the occasion of his marriage to Meghan Markle. It is named after the small fishing port of Kilkeel, County Down, with a population of 6,887, in the District of Newry, Mourne and Down in Northern Ireland. On the same day, he was also created Duke of Sussex and Earl of Dumbarton. Traditionally, male members of the royal family are granted at least one title on their wedding day by the monarch.

== History ==
Prior to 2018, there had never been a noble title connected to Kilkeel (from Irish Cill Chaoil, meaning 'church of the narrow'), which lies within the historic barony of Mourne. In the Middle Ages, it was said to be the centre of power of the Mugdorna (Múrna, Mughdorna, Mourne), an Irish tribe. It is located near the Mourne Mountains and is used as the base for a large fishing fleet.

The barony was newly created to allow Prince Harry to hold a Northern Irish title. The title of the barony was discussed between the Queen and Prince Harry privately; however, the Queen was the one who chose the title to bestow.

=== First creation, 2018 ===
| Baron | Portrait | Birth | Marriage(s) | Death |
|---|---|---|---|---|
| Prince Harry; House of Windsor; 2018–present also: Duke of Sussex and Earl of Dumbarton (2018) | Prince Harry | 15 September 1984; St Mary's Hospital, London son of Charles, Prince of Wales, and Lady Diana Spencer | Meghan Markle; 19 May 2018; 2 children, Prince Archie of Sussex and Princess Lilibet of Sussex | Living |

== Line of succession ==
- Prince Harry, Baron Kilkeel (b. 1984)
  - (1) Prince Archie of Sussex (b. 2019)
