= Substantive title =

Type of title of nobility or royalty

A substantive title, in the United Kingdom, is a title of nobility which is owned in its own right, as opposed to titles shared among cadets, borne as a courtesy title by a peer's relatives, or acquired through marriage.

== Current monarchies ==
- United Kingdom – Prince of Wales (must be conferred by the monarch after merging in the Crown)
- United Kingdom – Duke of Cornwall (restricted to the eldest son of the monarch who is also heir apparent)
- United Kingdom – Duke of Rothesay (restricted to the eldest son of the monarch who is also heir apparent)

== Granted titles ==
The Almanach de Gotha treated titles used by dynasties of abolished monarchies: the head of the house bearing a traditional title of the dynasty in lieu of or after the given name.

- United Kingdom:
  - Princess Royal; since 1987
  - Duke of Albany
  - Duke of Cambridge; since 2011: on occasion of the recipient's wedding
  - Duke of Clarence
  - Duke of Edinburgh; since 2023: on occasion of the recipient's birthday
  - Duke of Gloucester
  - Duke of Kent
  - Duke of Lancaster
  - Duke of Sussex; since 2018: on occasion of the recipient's wedding
  - Duke of York; since 1986: on occasion of the recipient's wedding
  - Duke of Windsor; from 1936, on occasion of the recipient's abdication
  - Earl of Forfar; since 2019: on occasion of the recipient's 55th birthday
  - Earl of Wessex; since 1999: on occasion of the recipient's wedding

In accordance with a tradition dating back to the reign of Napoleon I, titles in pretence were treated by the Almanach de Gotha as if still borne by members of reigning dynasties.
