= Subsidiary title =

Hereditary title held by a royal or a noble

A subsidiary title is a title of authority or title of honour that is held by a royal or noble person but which is not regularly used to identify that person, due to the concurrent holding of a greater title.

== United Kingdom ==
An example in the United Kingdom is the Duke of Norfolk, who is also the Earl of Arundel, the Earl of Surrey, the Earl of Norfolk, the Baron Beaumont, the Baron Maltravers, the Baron FitzAlan, the Baron Clun, the Baron Oswaldestre, and the Baron Howard of Glossop. In everyday usage, the individual who holds all of these titles would be referred to only by the most senior title (in this case, Duke of Norfolk), while all of the other titles would be subsidiary titles.

=== Use as a courtesy title ===
The heir apparent to a duke, marquess or earl may use any subsidiary title of that peer (usually the most senior) as a courtesy title, provided that it does not cause confusion. For example, the Duke of Norfolk's heir apparent is known as "Earl of Arundel" (without the definite article). However, the heir does not technically become the Earl of Arundel (as a substantive title) until his father's death, and he remains legally a commoner until then.

If a subsidiary peerage has the same name as a higher peerage, it is not used as a courtesy title, in order to avoid any confusion. For example, the Duke of Manchester is also the Earl of Manchester, but his heir apparent is styled "Viscount Mandeville", this being the duke's highest subsidiary title that does not contain the name "Manchester".

=== Writ of acceleration ===
Before the House of Lords Act 1999, which abolished the automatic right of hereditary peers to sit in the House of Lords, an heir apparent could be summoned to the Lords, before the current title holder's death, by a writ of acceleration – that is, by accelerating the inheritance of a junior title (usually a barony). For example, a writ of acceleration could have been used to cause a courtesy Earl of Arundel to inherit the Maltravers barony prematurely, whereupon he would gain that as a substantive title and could join the House of Lords as Lord Maltravers.
