= Prince Archie of Sussex =

British prince (born 2019)

Prince Archie
- Born: Archie Harrison Mountbatten-Windsor; 6 May 2019 (age 7); Portland Hospital, London, United Kingdom
- House: Windsor
- Father: Prince Harry, Duke of Sussex
- Mother: Meghan Markle

Prince Archie of Sussex (Archie Harrison Mountbatten-Windsor; born 6 May 2019) is a member of the British royal family. He is the son of Prince Harry, Duke of Sussex, and Meghan, Duchess of Sussex. A grandson of King Charles III, he is sixth in the line of succession to the British throne.

== Birth, family and infancy ==
Archie was born at 05:26 (BST) (04:26 UTC) on 6 May 2019 at Portland Hospital in London, during the reign of his paternal great-grandmother, Queen Elizabeth II. He is the first child of Prince Harry, Duke of Sussex, and Meghan, Duchess of Sussex. Unlike previous royal births, there was no immediate photocall on the hospital steps. His birth was announced by Buckingham Palace via a framed notice on an easel, although, unlike earlier royal births, the notice did not include signatures from the mother's doctors. Several landmarks were illuminated in different colours to mark the occasion, including Niagara Falls, the CN Tower, and the London Eye. His name was announced on 8 May. Archie has mixed-race ancestry, with African-American and European-American maternal lineage, and holds dual citizenship of the United Kingdom and the United States. He is sixth in the line of succession to the British throne.

Archie's parents brought him to meet his great-grandparents Queen Elizabeth II and Prince Philip for the first time when he was two days old. He was christened Archie Harrison Mountbatten-Windsor, wearing the royal christening gown, by Justin Welby, Archbishop of Canterbury, on 6 July in the private chapel at Windsor Castle, using water from the River Jordan. In a break from royal tradition, his parents did not make public the identities of his godparents. Four of the godparents were later reported to be Charlie van Straubenzee, Tiggy Pettifer, Mark Dyer, and the 7th Duke of Westminster.

In early 2020, Archie's parents stepped down from their roles as working members of the royal family. The family then moved to North America and settled in Montecito, California, in the summer of that year. His younger sister, Lilibet, was born in 2021. The family visited the UK in June 2022 during Queen Elizabeth II's Platinum Jubilee celebrations, and again in July 2026. In August 2026, the family relocated to the UK, with Archie and Lilibet enrolled to begin school there in September. In September, they changed schools after two days, following concerns from the family's security team about transport between their home and the original school.

== Public appearances ==
In September and October 2019, Archie accompanied his parents on a Southern African tour to Malawi, Angola, South Africa, and Botswana. To mark his first birthday in 2020, he appeared in a storytime video with his mother as part of the Save with Stories campaign, a project aimed at supporting children and families affected by the COVID-19 pandemic.

== Title and styles ==
As heir apparent to his father's dukedom of Sussex, earldom of Dumbarton, and barony of Kilkeel, Archie was at birth and by custom entitled to use Prince Harry's senior subsidiary title, Earl of Dumbarton, as a courtesy. However, the media reported that Harry and Meghan decided instead that Archie would be styled as Master Archie Harrison Mountbatten-Windsor, in accordance with their reported wish that he grow up as a private citizen.

Upon the accession of Charles III, Archie became entitled to use the title "prince" and the style "Royal Highness", as the child of a son of the monarch, pursuant to letters patent issued by King George V in 1917. However, sources reported that it was unclear whether he would use that title and style, noting that not all members of the royal family who are eligible for a title choose to do so. In the interview Oprah with Meghan and Harry, Meghan said that she had been told that changes would be made to remove that entitlement; Charles III's plans for a scaled-down royal family date back to the 1990s.

The official website of the royal family was updated to refer to him as "Prince Archie of Sussex" on 9 March 2023. It was reported that any titles would be used in formal settings but not in everyday conversational use.

== See also ==
- Family tree of the British royal family
- List of current British princes and princesses

Prince Archie of Sussex House of Windsor Born: 6 May 2019
Lines of succession
Preceded by The Duke of Sussex	Succession to the British throne 6th in line	Followed by Princess Lilibet of Sussex
Orders of precedence in the United Kingdom
Preceded by Prince Louis of Wales	Gentlemen; Prince Archie of Sussex	Succeeded by Andrew Mountbatten-Windsor
