= List of dukedoms in the peerages of Britain and Ireland =

Peerages and baronetcies of Britain and Ireland
Extant	All
Dukes	Dukedoms
Marquesses	Marquessates
Earls	Earldoms
Viscounts	Viscountcies
Barons	Baronies
Baronets	Baronetcies

This article lists all dukedoms, extant, extinct, dormant, abeyant, or forfeit, in the peerages of England, Scotland, Great Britain, Ireland and the United Kingdom.

== Introduction of dukedoms into England ==
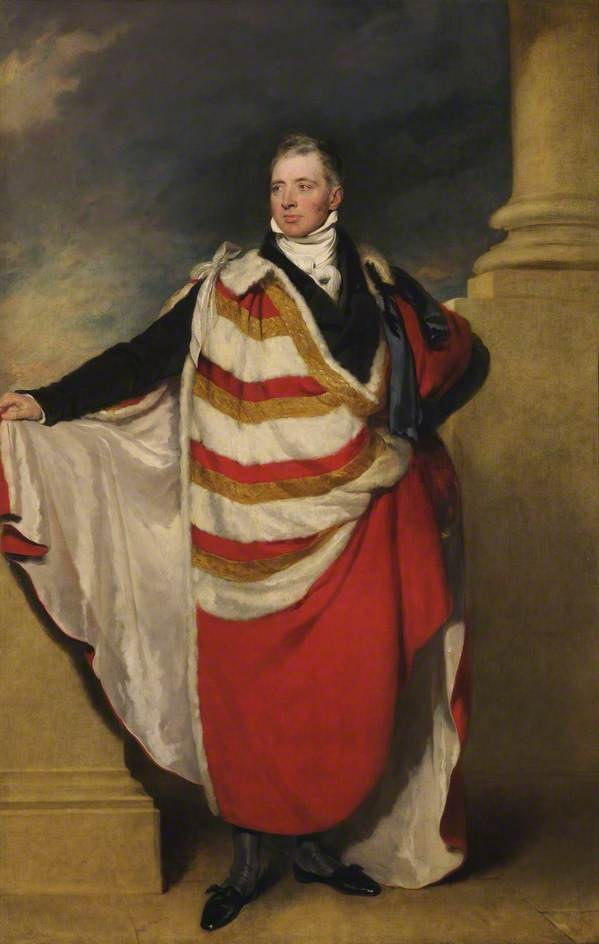
George Henry Fitzroy in his robes as Duke of Grafton

Edward III of England created the first three dukedoms of England (Cornwall, Lancaster, and Clarence). His eldest son, Edward, the Black Prince, was created Duke of Cornwall, the first English Duke, in 1337. Two weeks after the Prince's death the dukedom was recreated for his 9-year-old son Richard of Bordeaux, who would eventually succeed his grandfather as Richard II. The Dukes of Cornwall are not numbered as part of their style.

The second dukedom was originally given to Henry of Grosmont, 1st Duke of Lancaster, but upon his death was re-created for the 3rd son of Edward III, John of Gaunt, 1st Duke of Lancaster. On that same day Edward III also created a dukedom for his second son, Lionel of Antwerp, 1st Duke of Clarence. When Richard II reached majority, he created dukedoms for his last two uncles on the same day: Edmund of Langley, 1st Duke of York, and Thomas of Woodstock, 1st Duke of Gloucester.

Originally, dukedoms were created for those who had royal blood, either by descent or marriage (see below, list of surnames). By the end of the Middle Ages, traditionally marked by the Battle of Bosworth Field on 22 August 1485, a total of 31 dukedoms (with 16 distinct titles) had been created; yet only those of Cornwall, Lancaster and Suffolk remained. The Duchy of Cornwall was permanently associated with the heir apparent, and the Duchy of Lancaster became Crown property.

The first Duke of Norfolk had died in the Battle of Bosworth Field in 1485. Three decades later the Dukedom of Norfolk was restored to his son by Henry VIII. Thus when Elizabeth I came to power the only living duke was Thomas Howard, 4th Duke of Norfolk. Elizabeth did not create any dukes, and she had Thomas Howard beheaded at the age of 36 for plotting to wed Mary, Queen of Scots and overthrow her. By 1572, this class of peerage was extinct, and there were no dukes in the last 30 years of her reign. The extant dukedoms in the Peerage of England were all created (or restored, in the cases of Norfolk and Somerset) in the Stuart period, beginning with James I's re-creation of the dukedom of Buckingham in 1623 for George Villiers.

With the possible exception of the Duchy of Cornwall and the Duchy of Lancaster (which come with great territories attached), all ducal titles in England have been created and held by royal patent or charter, and not by tenure. As a result, the rules of succession to a ducal title are usually explicitly laid out in the patent, and are not necessarily consistent, nor do they coincide with common inheritance laws on property. For instance, an heir does not usually inherit the ducal title by virtue of being the heir of the last holder, but by virtue of descent from the first person to whom the title was given, so a full-blood daughter of a duke may be superseded by a half-blood male relative who can prove direct descent from the first holder.

== Dukedoms in the Peerage of England, 1337–1707 ==
English title (royal)	Creation	Grantee	Surname	Current status (extant)	Notes	Monarch
Cornwall (1st creation)	9 February 1337	Edward of Woodstock	Plantagenet (originally)	Extant	Held by the eldest living son of the monarch who is also heir-apparent to the throne; title currently held by William, Prince of Wales. See also Duchy of Cornwall.	Edward III
Lancaster (1st creation)	6 March 1351	Henry of Grosmont	Plantagenet	Extinct 13 March 1361	—	Edward III
Clarence (1st creation)	13 November 1362	Lionel of Antwerp	Plantagenet	Extinct 17 October 1368	—	Edward III
Lancaster (2nd creation)	13 November 1362	John of Gaunt	Plantagenet	Merged in crown 30 September 1399	The Sovereign is occasionally styled as Duke of Lancaster, regardless of gender. See also Duchy of Lancaster.	Edward III
Cornwall (2nd creation)	20 November 1376	Richard of Bordeaux	Plantagenet	Merged in crown 22 June 1377	Distinct from the 1337 creation, as the holder was not the eldest son of the monarch	Edward III
York (1st creation)	6 August 1385	Edmund of Langley	Plantagenet	Merged in crown 4 March 1461	Forfeit 1415–1425; November 1459 – 7 October 1460	Richard II
Gloucester (1st creation)	6 August 1385	Thomas of Woodstock	Plantagenet	Forfeit 8 September 1397	—	Richard II
Ireland	13 October 1386	Robert	Vere	Forfeit 3 February 1388	Creation for life only.	Richard II
Hereford	29 September 1397	Henry of Bolingbroke	Plantagenet	Merged in crown 30 September 1399	—	Richard II
Albemarle (Aumale) (1st creation)	29 September 1397	Edward of Norwich	Plantagenet	Deprived of title 3 November 1399	Also Earl of Rutland from 1390 and Duke of York from 1402	Richard II
Exeter (1st creation)	29 September 1397	John	Holland	Deprived of title 1399	Descendant of Edmund of Woodstock, earl of Kent, son of Edward I.	Richard II
Surrey	29 September 1397	Thomas	Holland	Forfeit 1399	Descendant of Edmund of Woodstock, earl of Kent, son of Edward I.	Richard II
Norfolk (1st joint creation)	29 September 1397	Thomas	Mowbray	Extinct 17 January 1476	Title not in use 1399–1425. Descendant in female line of Thomas of Brotherton, Earl of Norfolk, son of Edward I.	Richard II
Norfolk (1st joint creation)	29 September 1397	Margaret	Plantagenet	Extinct 24 March 1400	For life only	Richard II
Lancaster (3rd creation)	10 November 1399	Henry of Monmouth	Plantagenet	Merged in crown 20 March 1413	Also Duke of Cornwall	Henry IV
Clarence (2nd creation)	2 July 1412	Thomas of Lancaster	Plantagenet	Extinct 22 March 1421	—	Henry IV
Bedford (1st and 2nd creations)	16 May 1414	John of Lancaster	Plantagenet	Extinct 14 September 1435	—	Henry V
Gloucester (2nd creation)	16 May 1414	Humphrey of Lancaster	Plantagenet	Extinct 28 February 1447	—	Henry V
Exeter (2nd creation)	18 November 1416	Thomas	Beaufort (Plantagenet)	Extinct 30 December 1426	Son of John of Gaunt, grandson of Edward III.	Henry V
Exeter (3rd creation)	6 January 1443	John	Holland	Forfeit 4 November 1461	Descendant of Edmund of Woodstock, earl of Kent, son of Edward I.	Henry VI
Somerset (1st creation)	28 August 1443	John	Beaufort (Plantagenet)	Extinct 27 May 1444	Descended from son of John of Gaunt, grandson of Edward III.	Henry VI
Buckingham (1st creation)	14 September 1444	Humphrey	Stafford	Forfeit 17 May 1521	Also forfeit 2 November 1483 – November 1485 Descendant of Anne of Gloucester, the daughter of Thomas of Woodstock, youngest son of Edward III.	Henry VI
Warwick	5 April 1445	Henry	Beauchamp	Extinct 11 June 1446	—	Henry VI
Somerset (2nd creation)	31 March 1448	Edmund	Beaufort (Plantagenet)	Forfeit 3 April 1464	Also forfeit 1461–1463 Descended from son of John of Gaunt, grandson of Edward III.	Henry VI
Suffolk (1st creation)	2 July 1448	William	de la Pole	Surrendered 26 February 1493	Forfeit 1450–1463. Married Elizabeth of York, sister of Edward IV and Richard III.	Henry VI
Clarence (3rd creation)	June 1461	George	Plantagenet	Forfeit 18 February 1478	—	Edward IV
Gloucester (3rd creation)	1461	Richard	Plantagenet	Merged in crown 22 June 1483	—	Edward IV
Bedford (3rd creation)	5 January 1470	George	Neville	Deprived of title 1478	Intended husband of Elizabeth of York, daughter of Edward IV.	Edward IV
York (2nd creation)	28 May 1474	Richard of Shrewsbury	Plantagenet	Extinct 1483	Also Duke of Norfolk from 1477	Edward IV
Norfolk (2nd creation)	12 June 1477	Richard of Shrewsbury	Plantagenet	Extinct 1483	Also Duke of York	Edward IV
Bedford (4th creation)	1478	George	Plantagenet	Extinct 1479	—	Edward IV
Norfolk (3rd creation)	28 June 1483	John	Howard, Fitzalan-Howard	Extant	Title forfeit 22 August 1485 – 1 February 1514, 27 January 1547 – October 1553, 2 June 1572 – September 1660. Descendant in female line of Thomas of Brotherton, Earl of Norfolk, son of Edward I.	Richard III
Bedford (5th creation)	27 October 1485	Jasper	Tudor	Extinct 21 December 1495	—	Henry VII
York (3rd creation)	31 October 1494	Henry	Tudor	Merged in crown 21 April 1509	Also Duke of Cornwall from 1502	Henry VII
Somerset (3rd creation)	24 February 1499	Edmund	Tudor	Extinct 19 June 1500	—	Henry VII
Suffolk (2nd creation)	1 February 1514	Charles	Brandon	Extinct 14 July 1551	Husband of Mary Tudor, sister of Henry VIII and former Queen of France.	Henry VIII
Richmond and Somerset	18 June 1525	Henry	Fitzroy	Extinct 22 July 1536	Illegitimate son of Henry VIII.	Henry VIII
Somerset (4th creation)	16 February 1547	Edward	Seymour	Extant	Forfeit 22 January 1552 – 13 September 1660. Maternal uncle of Edward VI.	Edward VI
Northumberland (1st creation)	11 October 1551	John	Dudley	Forfeit 22 August 1553	—	Edward VI
Suffolk (3rd creation)	11 October 1551	Henry	Grey	Forfeit 23 February 1554	Married Lady Frances Brandon, daughter of Charles Brandon, Duke of Suffolk and Mary Tudor, sister of Henry VIII.	Edward VI
York (4th creation)	6 January 1605	Charles	Stuart	Merged in crown 27 March 1625	Also Duke of Albany in Scotland and Duke of Cornwall and Rothesay from 1612	James I
Richmond (1st creation)	17 May 1623	Ludovic	Stuart	Extinct 16 February 1624	—	James I
Buckingham (2nd creation)	18 May 1623	George	Villiers	Extinct 16 April 1687	—	James I
Richmond (2nd creation)	8 August 1641	James	Stuart	Extinct 12 December 1672	—	Charles I
Cumberland (1st creation)	24 January 1644	Prince Rupert of the Rhine	None (royal prince) (Wittelsbach)	Extinct 29 November 1682	Created for Prince Rupert of the Rhine	Charles I
York (5th creation)	27 January 1644	James	Stuart	Merged in crown 6 February 1685	—	Charles I
Dudley	23 May 1644	Alice	Dudley	Extinct 22 January 1669	For life only	Charles I
Gloucester (4th creation)	13 May 1659	Henry	Stuart	Extinct 13 September 1660	—	Charles II
Albemarle (2nd creation)	7 July 1660	George	Monck	Extinct 6 October 1688	—	Charles II
Monmouth	14 February 1663	James	Scott (illegitimate Stuart)	Forfeit 15 July 1685	—	Charles II
Cambridge (1st creation)	23 August 1664	James	Stuart	Extinct 20 June 1667	—	Charles II
Newcastle (upon Tyne) (1st creation)	16 March 1665	William	Cavendish	Extinct 26 July 1691	—	Charles II
Kendal (1st creation)	1666	Charles	Stuart	Extinct 22 May 1667	—	Charles II
Cambridge (2nd creation)	7 October 1667	Edgar	Stuart	Extinct 8 June 1671	—	Charles II
Cleveland (1st creation)	3 August 1670	Barbara	Villiers, Fitzroy (illegitimate Stuart)	Extinct 18 May 1774	Also Duke of Southampton from 1709	Charles II
Portsmouth	19 August 1673	Louise	Penancoët de Kérouaille	Extinct 14 November 1734	For life only	Charles II
Richmond (3rd creation)	9 August 1675	Charles	Lennox (illegitimate Stuart)	Extant	Also Duke of Gordon in the United Kingdom from 1876 and Duke of Lennox in Scotland	Charles II
Southampton	10 September 1675	Charles	Fitzroy (illegitimate Stuart)	Extinct 18 May 1774	Also Duke of Cleveland from 1709	Charles II
Grafton	11 September 1675	Henry	Fitzroy (illegitimate Stuart)	Extant	—	Charles II
Ormonde (2nd creation)	9 November 1682	James	Butler	Forfeit 20 August 1715	Also Duke of Ormonde in Ireland	Charles II
Beaufort	2 December 1682	Henry	Somerset (illegitimate Plantagenet)	Extant	Descended from John of Gaunt, son of Edward III via house of Beaufort.	Charles II
Northumberland (2nd creation)	6 April 1683	George	Fitzroy (illegitimate Stuart)	Extinct 3 July 1716	—	Charles II
St Albans	10 January 1684	Charles	Beauclerk (illegitimate Stuart)	Extant	—	Charles II
Berwick-upon-Tweed	19 March 1687	James	Fitzjames (illegitimate Stuart)	Unclear	It was long thought that the title was forfeit sometime around 1695, but there is no evidence of an attainder. If there was not one, the title is extant and held by the Dukes of Peñaranda del Duero.	James II
Cumberland (2nd creation)	9 April 1689	Prince George	Oldenburg	Extinct 28 October 1708	—	William III and Mary II
Bolton	9 April 1689	Charles	Paulet	Extinct 25 December 1794	—	William III and Mary II
Schomberg	10 April 1689	Frederick	Schomberg	Extinct 5 July 1719	Also Duke of Leinster in Ireland from 1691	William III and Mary II
Shrewsbury	30 April 1694	Charles	Talbot	Extinct 1 February 1718	—	William III and Mary II
Leeds	4 May 1694	Thomas	Osborne	Extinct 20 March 1964	—	William III and Mary II
Bedford (6th creation)	11 May 1694	William	Russell	Extant	—	William III and Mary II
Devonshire	12 May 1694	William	Cavendish	Extant	—	William III and Mary II
Newcastle (upon Tyne) (2nd creation)	14 May 1694	John	Holles	Extinct 15 July 1711	—	William III and Mary II
Marlborough	14 December 1702	John	Churchill, Spencer, Spencer-Churchill	Extant	—	Anne
Buckingham and Normanby	23 March 1703	John	Sheffield	Extinct 30 October 1735	—	Anne
Rutland	29 March 1703	John	Manners	Extant	—	Anne
Montagu (1st creation)	14 April 1705	Ralph	Montagu	Extinct 16 July 1749	—	Anne
Cambridge (3rd creation)	9 November 1706	George	Hanover	Merged in crown 11 June 1727	Also Duke of Cornwall and Rothesay from 1714	Anne

(continues below Scotland as Dukedoms of Great Britain)

== Dukedoms in the Peerage of Scotland, 1398–1707 ==
Scottish title (royal)	Creation	Surname	Current status (extant)	Notes	Monarch
Rothesay	28 April 1398	Stuart (originally)	Extant	Held by eldest son of the monarch who is also heir-apparent; thus also Duke of Cornwall since 1603	Robert III
Albany (1st creation)	28 April 1398	Stuart	Forfeit 24 May 1425	—	Robert III
Albany (2nd creation)	1457 abt	Stuart	Extinct 2 June 1536	Forfeit 1479–1482, 1483–1514	James II
Ross	29 January 1488	Stuart	Extinct 17 January 1504	—	James III
Montrose (1st creation)	18 May 1488	Lindsay	Extinct December 1495	Deprived of title 1488–1489, title for life from 1489	James III
Ross	1514	Stuart	Extinct 18 December 1515	Alexander Stewart was styled Duke of Ross, but never formally created a peer.	James V
Albany (only styled as such)	1541	Stuart	Extinct 1541	Arthur Stewart was styled Duke of Albany, but never formally created a peer	James V
Albany (3rd creation)	20 July 1565	Stuart	Merged in crown 24 July 1567	—	Mary I
Orkney	12 May 1567	Hepburn	Forfeit 29 December 1567	—	Mary I
Lennox (1st creation)	5 August 1581	Stuart	Extinct 12 December 1672	Also Duke of Richmond in England from 1623 until 1624 and from 1641; sat in the English House of Lords as Earl of Richmond 1613–1623 and as Earl of March 1624–1641	James VI
Albany (4th creation)	23 December 1600	Stuart	Merged in crown 27 March 1625	Also Duke of York in England from 1605 and Duke of Rothesay from 1612	James VI
Kintyre and Lorne	1602	Stuart	Extinct 1602	—	James VI
Hamilton (1st creation)	12 April 1643	Hamilton, Douglas-Hamilton	Extant	Also Duke of Brandon in Great Britain from 1711; sat in the English House of Lords as Earl of Cambridge in the Peerage of England 1643–1651 and in the British House of Lords as Duke of Brandon in the Peerage of Great Britain 1782–1963	Charles I
Hamilton (2nd creation)	20 September 1660	Douglas (Hamilton)	Extinct 18 April 1694	For life only; husband of the suo jure Duchess of Hamilton	Charles II
Albany (5th creation)	31 December 1660	Stuart	Merged in crown 6 February 1685	Also Duke of York in England	Charles II
Buccleuch (1st creation)	20 April 1663	Scott	Forfeit 15 July 1685	Also Duke of Monmouth in England	Charles II
Buccleuch (2nd creation)	20 April 1663	Scott, Montagu-Douglas-Scott	Extant	Also Duke of Queensberry from 1810; sat in the House of Lords as Earl of Doncaster in the Peerage of England 1743–1963	Charles II
Lauderdale	1 May 1672	Maitland	Extinct 24 August 1682		Charles II
Lennox (2nd creation)	9 September 1675	Lennox	Extant	Also Duke of Gordon in the United Kingdom from 1876 and Duke of Richmond in England	Charles II
Rothes	29 May 1680	Leslie	Extinct 27 July 1681	—	Charles II
Gordon (1st creation)	3 November 1684	Gordon	Extinct 28 May 1836	Sat in the House of Lords as Earl of Norwich in the Peerage of Great Britain 1784–1836	Charles II
Queensberry	3 November 1684	Douglas, Montagu-Douglas Scott	Extant	Also Duke of Dover in Great Britain from 1708 until 1778 and Duke of Buccleuch from 1810	Charles II
Argyll (1st creation)	23 June 1701	Campbell	Extant	Also Duke of Greenwich in Great Britain from 1718 until 1743 and Duke of Argyll in the United Kingdom from 1892; sat in the House of Lords as Earl of Greenwich 1705–1743, and as Baron Sundridge 1782–1892	William II
Douglas	10 April 1703	Douglas	Extinct 21 July 1761	Created for the Marquess of Douglas	Anne
Atholl	30 June 1703	Murray	Extant	Sat in the House of Lords as Earl Strange 1786–1957	Anne
Montrose (2nd creation)	24 April 1707	Graham	Extant	Sat in the House of Lords as Earl Graham 1782–1963	Anne
Roxburghe	25 April 1707	Ker	Extant	Dormant 22 October 1805 – 11 May 1812; Sat in the House of Lords as Earl Ker 1782–1804 and as Earl Innes 1837–1963	Anne

== Dukedoms in the Peerage of Great Britain, 1707–1801 ==
Great Britain title (royal)	Creation	Grantee	Surname	Current status (extant)	Notes	Monarch
Dover	26 May 1708	James Douglas, Duke of Queensberry	Douglas	Extinct 22 October 1778	Also Duke of Queensberry in Scotland	Anne
Kent (1st creation)	28 April 1710	Henry Grey, Marquess of Kent	Grey	Extinct 5 June 1740	—	Anne
Brandon	10 September 1711	James Hamilton, Duke of Hamilton	Douglas-Hamilton	Extant	Also Duke of Hamilton in Scotland	Anne
Ancaster and Kesteven	26 July 1715	Robert Bertie, Marquess of Lindsey	Bertie	Extinct 8 February 1809	—	George I
Kingston-upon-Hull	10 August 1715	Evelyn Pierrepont, Marquess of Dorchester	Pierrepont	Extinct 23 September 1773	—	George I
Newcastle (upon Tyne) (3rd creation)	11 August 1715	Thomas Pelham-Holles, Earl of Clare	Pelham-Holles	Extinct 17 November 1768	Also Duke of Newcastle-under-Lyne from 1757	George I
York and Albany (1st creation)	5 July 1716	Ernest Augustus, Prince-Bishop of Osnabrück	Hanover	Extinct 14 August 1728	—	George I
Portland	6 July 1716	Henry Bentinck, Earl of Portland	Bentinck	Extinct 30 July 1990	—	George I
Wharton	28 January 1718	Philip Wharton, Marquess of Wharton	Wharton	Extinct 31 May 1731	—	George I
Kendal (2nd creation)	19 March 1719	Melusine von der Schulenburg, Duchess of Munster	Schulenburg	Extinct 10 May 1743	Also Duchess of Munster in Ireland, peerage for life only	George I
Greenwich	27 April 1719	John Campbell, Duke of Argyll	Campbell	Extinct 4 October 1743	Also Duke of Argyll in Scotland	George I
Manchester	28 April 1719	Charles Montagu, Earl of Manchester	Montagu	Extant	—	George I
Chandos	29 April 1719	James Brydges, Earl of Carnarvon	Brydges	Extinct 29 September 1789	—	George I
Dorset	17 June 1720	Lionel Cranfield Sackville, Earl of Dorset	Sackville	Extinct 29 July 1843	—	George I
Bridgewater	18 June 1720	Scroop Egerton, Earl of Bridgewater	Egerton	Extinct 8 March 1803	—	George I
Edinburgh (1st creation)	26 July 1726	Prince Frederick Louis	Hanover	Merged in crown 25 October 1760	Also Duke of Cornwall and Rothesay 1727–1751	George I
Cumberland (3rd creation)	27 July 1726	Prince William	Hanover	Extinct 31 October 1765	—	George I
Newcastle (under Lyne)	17 November 1756	Thomas Pelham-Holles, Duke of Newcastle upon Tyne	Pelham-Holles, Pelham-Clinton	Extinct 25 December 1988	Also Duke of Newcastle upon Tyne until 1768	George II
York and Albany (2nd creation)	1 April 1760	Prince Edward Augustus	Hanover	Extinct 17 September 1767	—	George II
Gloucester and Edinburgh	19 November 1764	Prince William Henry	Hanover	Extinct 30 November 1834	—	George III
Northumberland (3rd creation)	22 October 1766	Hugh Percy, Earl of Northumberland	Percy	Extant	—	George III
Cumberland and Strathearn	22 October 1766	Prince Henry Frederick	Hanover	Extinct 18 September 1790	—	George III
Montagu (2nd creation)	5 November 1766	George Montagu, Earl of Cardigan	Montagu	Extinct 23 May 1790	—	George III
York and Albany (3rd creation)	29 November 1784	Prince Frederick Augustus	Hanover	Extinct 5 January 1827	—	George III
Clarence and St Andrews	20 May 1789	Prince William Henry	Hanover	Merged in crown 26 June 1830	—	George III
Kent and Strathearn	24 April 1799	Prince Edward Augustus	Hanover	Extinct 23 January 1820	—	George III
Cumberland and Teviotdale	24 April 1799	Prince Ernest Augustus	Hanover	Suspended 28 March 1919	—	George III

(continues below Ireland as Dukedoms of the United Kingdom)

== Dukedoms in the Peerage of Ireland, 1661–1868 ==
Irish title	Creation	Grantee	Surname	Current status (extant)	Notes	Monarch
Ormonde (1st creation)	30 March 1661	James Butler, Marquess of Ormonde	Butler	Extinct 17 December 1758	Also Duke of Ormonde in England until 1715; the title was generally considered forfeit after 1715, and the third duke, brother of the attainted second duke, who held the title after 1745, did not use it.	Charles II
Leinster (1st creation)	3 March 1691	Lord Meinhardt Schomberg	Schomberg	Extinct 16 July 1719	Also Duke of Schomberg in England from 1693	William III and Mary II
Munster	18 July 1716	Ehrengard Melusine von der Schulenburg	Schulenberg	Extinct 10 May 1743	Also Duchess of Kendal in Great Britain from 1719	George I
Leinster (2nd creation)	26 November 1766	James FitzGerald, Marquess of Kildare	FitzGerald	Extant	Sat in the British House of Lords as Viscount Leinster 1747–1999	George III
Abercorn	10 August 1868	James Hamilton, Marquess of Abercorn	Hamilton	Extant	Sat in the House of Lords as Marquess of Abercorn 1868–1999	Victoria

== Dukedoms in the Peerage of the United Kingdom, 1801–present ==
United Kingdom title (royal)	Creation	Grantee	Surname	Current status (extant)	Notes	Monarch
Sussex (1st creation)	27 November 1801	Prince Augustus Frederick	Hanover	Extinct 21 April 1843	—	George III
Cambridge (4th creation)	27 November 1801	Prince Adolphus	Hanover	Extinct 17 March 1904	—	George III
Wellington	11 May 1814	Arthur Wellesley, Marquess of Wellington	Wellesley	Extant	—	George III
Buckingham and Chandos	4 February 1822	Richard Temple-Nugent-Brydges-Chandos-Grenville, Marquess of Buckingham	Temple-Nugent-Brydges-Chandos-Grenville	Extinct 26 March 1889	—	George IV
Sutherland	28 January 1833	George Leveson-Gower, Marquess of Stafford	Leveson-Gower; Sutherland-Leveson-Gower; Egerton	Extant	—	William IV
Cleveland (1st creation)	29 January 1833	William Vane, Marquess of Cleveland	Vane; Powlett	Extinct 21 August 1891	—	William IV
Inverness	10 April 1840	Cecilia Underwood	Underwood	Extinct 1 August 1873	Wife of The Duke of Sussex	Victoria
Edinburgh (2nd creation)	24 May 1866	Prince Alfred	Saxe-Coburg and Gotha	Extinct 30 July 1900	—	Victoria
Westminster	27 February 1874	Hugh Grosvenor, Marquess of Westminster	Grosvenor	Extant	—	Victoria
Connaught and Strathearn	24 May 1874	Prince Arthur	Saxe-Coburg and Gotha	Extinct 26 April 1943	—	Victoria
Gordon (2nd creation)	13 January 1876	Charles Gordon-Lennox, Duke of Richmond	Gordon-Lennox	Extant	Also Duke of Richmond in England and Duke of Lennox in Scotland	Victoria
Albany (6th creation)	24 May 1881	Prince Leopold	Saxe-Coburg and Gotha	Suspended 28 March 1919	—	Victoria
Fife (1st creation)	29 July 1889	Alexander Duff, Earl of Fife	Duff	Extinct 29 January 1912	Letters Patent contained the standard remainder "heirs male of his body". A re-creation in 1900 allowed the first Duke's daughters and their male issue to inherit (see below).	Victoria
Clarence and Avondale	24 May 1890	Prince Albert Victor of Wales	Saxe-Coburg and Gotha	Extinct 14 January 1892	—	Victoria
Argyll (2nd creation)	7 April 1892	George Campbell, Duke of Argyll	Campbell	Extant	Also Duke of Argyll in Scotland	Victoria
York (6th creation)	24 May 1892	Prince George of Wales	Saxe-Coburg and Gotha	Merged in crown 6 May 1910	Also Duke of Cornwall and Rothesay from 1901	Victoria
Fife (2nd creation)	24 April 1900	Alexander Duff, Duke of Fife	Duff; Carnegie	Extant	—	Victoria
York (7th creation)	5 June 1920	Prince Albert	Windsor	Merged in crown 11 December 1936	—	George V
Gloucester (5th creation)	31 March 1928	Prince Henry	Windsor	Extant	—	George V
Kent (2nd creation)	12 October 1934	Prince George	Windsor	Extant	—	George V
Windsor	8 March 1937	Prince Edward	Windsor	Extinct 28 May 1972	—	George VI
Edinburgh (3rd creation)	20 November 1947	Philip Mountbatten	Mountbatten	Merged in crown 8 September 2022	—	George VI
York (8th creation)	23 July 1986	Andrew Mountbatten-Windsor	Windsor	Extant	Andrew ceased using his peerage titles and was removed from the Roll of the Peerage in 2025. The (non-used) dukedom is non-royal from 2025 when Andrew was deprived of the style of Royal Highness and the dignity of prince.	Elizabeth II
Cambridge (5th creation)	29 April 2011	Prince William of Wales	Windsor	Extant	Also Duke of Cornwall and Rothesay from 2022	Elizabeth II
Sussex (2nd creation)	19 May 2018	Prince Henry of Wales	Windsor	Extant	—	Elizabeth II
Edinburgh (4th creation)	10 March 2023	Prince Edward, Earl of Wessex and Forfar	Windsor	Extant	For life only	Charles III

== See also ==
- British nobility
- Dukes in the United Kingdom
- Royal dukedoms in the United Kingdom
- List of dukes in the peerages of Britain and Ireland, a list of present and extant dukedoms in the peerages of the Kingdom of England, Kingdom of Scotland, Kingdom of Great Britain, Kingdom of Ireland, United Kingdom of Great Britain and Ireland, and the United Kingdom of Great Britain and Northern Ireland 1927 and after.
- Duchies in England
- List of marquessates
- List of earldoms
- List of viscountcies
- List of baronies
