= Royal dukedoms in the United Kingdom =

Dukedoms held by British royals

In the British peerage, a royal duke is a member of the British royal family, entitled to the titular dignity of prince and the style of His Royal Highness, who holds a dukedom. Dukedoms are the highest titles in the British roll of peerage, and the holders of these particular dukedoms are princes of the blood royal. The holders of the dukedoms are royal, not the titles themselves. They are titles created and bestowed on legitimate sons and male-line grandsons of the British monarch, usually upon reaching their majority or marriage. The titles can be inherited but cease to be called "royal" once they pass beyond the grandsons of a monarch. As with any peerage, once the title becomes extinct, it may subsequently be recreated by the reigning monarch at any time.

== Royal status of dukedoms ==
In the United Kingdom, there is nothing intrinsic to any dukedom that makes it "royal". Rather, these peerages are called royal dukedoms because they are created for, and held by, members of the royal family who are entitled to the titular dignity of prince and the style Royal Highness. Although the term "royal duke", therefore, has no official meaning per se, the category "Duke of the Blood Royal" was acknowledged as a rank conferring special precedence at court in the unrevoked 20th clause of the Lord Chamberlain's order of 1520. This decree accorded precedence to any peer related by blood to the sovereign above all others of the same degree within the peerage. The order did not apply within Parliament, nor did it grant precedence above the archbishop of Canterbury or other Great Officers of State such as is now enjoyed by royal dukes. But it placed junior "Dukes of the Blood Royal" above the most senior non-royal duke, junior "Earls of the Blood Royal" above the most senior non-royal earl (cf. Earldom of Wessex), etc. It did not matter how distantly related to the monarch the peers might be (presumably they ranked among each other in order of succession to the Crown). Although the 1520 order is theoretically still in effect, in fact the "Blood Royal" clause seems to have fallen into desuetude by 1917 when King George V limited the style of Royal Highness to children and male-line grandchildren of the sovereign. Thus peers of the blood royal who are neither sons nor grandsons of a sovereign are no longer accorded precedence above other peers. While royal dukes were summoned to the House of Lords, like other dukes until 1999, by the 20th-century they seldom appeared and by convention did not participate.

When the present Duke of Gloucester and Duke of Kent are succeeded by their heirs (currently Alexander Windsor, Earl of Ulster and George Windsor, Earl of St Andrews, respectively) their peerages (as created in 1928 and 1934) will cease to be royal dukedoms; instead their holders will become "ordinary" dukes. The third dukes of Gloucester and Kent will each be styled His Grace because, as great-grandsons of King George V (or more distant relations, if the present Dukes outlive their sons), they are not princes and are not styled HRH. Similarly, upon the 1942 death of Prince Arthur, Duke of Connaught and Strathearn (son of Queen Victoria), his only male-line grandson, Alastair, Earl of Macduff, succeeded to his peerages and was styled His Grace. Before the 1917 changes, his style had been His Highness Prince Alastair of Connaught.

== Current royal dukedoms ==
The current royal dukedoms, in order of precedence, are:

Dukedom	Holder	Year created	Subsidiary titles
Duke of Cornwall	William, Prince of Wales	1337	None
Duke of Rothesay	William, Prince of Wales	1398	Earl of Carrick; Baron of Renfrew; Lord of the Isles; Prince and Great Steward of Scotland
Duke of Cambridge	William, Prince of Wales	2011	Earl of Strathearn; Baron Carrickfergus
Duke of Sussex	Prince Harry	2018	Earl of Dumbarton; Baron Kilkeel
Duke of Edinburgh	Prince Edward	2023	Earl of Wessex; Earl of Forfar; Viscount Severn
Duke of Gloucester	Prince Richard	1928	Earl of Ulster; Baron Culloden
Duke of Kent	Prince Edward	1934	Earl of St Andrews; Baron Downpatrick

The Dukedoms of Cambridge, Sussex, Gloucester, and Kent are hereditary according to the letters patent that created them. Those patents contain the standard remainder to "heirs male of his body". However, if Prince William outlives his father and becomes King, the Dukedom of Cambridge will merge with the crown at that time and not be inherited by his son.

The Dukedom of Edinburgh is a life peerage and will become extinct on the death of the current Duke.

Duke of Cornwall is a title automatically held by the Sovereign's eldest son in England. In addition to the dukedom of Cornwall, a peerage, the holder also enjoys a life interest in the Duchy of Cornwall. Duke of Rothesay is a title automatically held by the Sovereign's heir apparent in Scotland, who is properly called "HRH The Prince William, Duke of Rothesay" (rather than "HRH The Prince of Wales") in Scotland.

By law the British monarch also holds, and is entitled to the revenues of, the Duchy of Lancaster. Within the borders of the County Palatine of Lancashire, therefore, the monarch is hailed as "The King/Queen, The Duke of Lancaster" (even when the monarch is a queen regnant, by tradition she does not use the title Duchess). However, legally the monarch is not the Duke of Lancaster: peerages are in origin held feudally of the sovereign who, as the fount of honour, cannot hold a peerage of him- or herself. The situation is similar in the Channel Islands, where the monarch is addressed as Duke of Normandy (even when the monarch is a queen regnant, she does not use the title Duchess), but only in accordance with tradition. He or she does not hold the legal title of Duke of Normandy.

== Former royal dukedoms ==
The following is a list of dukedoms previously created for members of the royal family, but which have subsequently merged in the crown, become extinct or have otherwise ceased to be royal dukedoms.

=== Extinct dukedoms ===
Title	Status	Notes
Duke of Albemarle	Deprived in 1399	Non-royal dukedom created in 1660 (extinct 1688); non-royal Earldom of Albemarle (created 1697) is extant
Duke of Clarence	Forfeit in 1478	Earldom of Clarence (created 1881) is a subsidiary title of the suspended Dukedom of Albany
Duke of Clarence and Avondale	Extinct in 1892	
Duke of Clarence and St Andrews	Merged in the crown in 1830	Earldom of St Andrews (created 1934) is a subsidiary title of the extant Dukedom of Kent
Duke of Connaught and Strathearn	Extinct in 1943	Earldom of Strathearn (created 2011) is a subsidiary title of the extant Dukedom of Cambridge
Duke of Cumberland	Extinct in 1765	
Duke of Cumberland and Strathearn	Extinct in 1790	
Duke of Gloucester and Edinburgh	Extinct in 1834	Separate Dukedoms of Gloucester and Edinburgh are extant.
Duke of Hereford	Merged in the crown in 1399	Non-royal Viscountcy of Hereford (created 1550) is extant
Duke of Kendal	Extinct in 1667	Non-royal dukedom created in 1719 (extinct 1743).
Duke of Kent and Strathearn	Extinct in 1820	Earldom of Strathearn (created 2011) is a subsidiary title of the extant Dukedom of Cambridge.
Duke of Kintyre and Lorne	Extinct in 1602	Non-royal Marquessate of Kintyre and Lorne (created 1701) is a subsidiary title of the extant Dukedom of Argyll
Duke of Ross	Extinct in 1515	
Duke of Windsor	Extinct in 1972	Created for King Edward VIII after his abdication. Non-royal Barony (created 1529) and Viscountcy of Windsor (created 1905) are subsidiary titles of the extant Earldom of Plymouth. Non-royal Earldom of Windsor (created 1796) is a subsidiary title of the extant Marquessate of Bute.
Duke of York and Albany	Extinct in 1827	

=== Suspended dukedoms ===
Under the Titles Deprivation Act 1917 the holders of the following dukedoms, who were simultaneously British princes and members of royal and princely families of Germany, were deprived of their British titles, having sided with Germany during the First World War. The Act provides that a successor of a person thus deprived of a peerage can petition the Crown for revival of the title. No such descendant has done so.

Title	Created	Deprived holder	Current claimant
Duke of Albany	1881	Charles Edward, Duke of Saxe-Coburg and Gotha	Prince Hubertus of Saxe Coburg and Gotha
Duke of Cumberland and Teviotdale	1799	Ernest Augustus, Crown Prince of Hanover	Prince Ernst August of Hanover

It was announced on 30 October 2025 that King Charles III had begun a "formal process" to remove Prince Andrew's style, titles, and honours. His name was subsequently removed from the Roll of the Peerage. Removal from the Roll of the Peerage prohibits formal use of the title, but the title remains extant, but not in use.

Title	Created	Deprived holder
Duke of York	1986	Andrew Mountbatten-Windsor

== Royal dukedoms created since 1726 ==
Coat of arms	Title	Prince	Date created	Notes
=== Reign of King George I ===
	Duke of Edinburgh	Prince Frederick	15 July 1726	Created Prince of Wales in 1729; Merged with the Crown in 1760
	Duke of Cumberland	Prince William	15 July 1726	Extinct in 1765 (Note: Died without legitimate male heirs.)
=== Reign of King George II ===
	Duke of York and Albany	Prince Edward	1 April 1760	Extinct in 1767
=== Reign of King George III ===
	Duke of Gloucester and Edinburgh	Prince William Henry	17 November 1764	Extinct in 1834 (Note: The 2nd Duke died without legitimate male heirs.)
	Duke of Cumberland and Strathearn	Prince Henry	22 October 1766	Extinct in 1790
	Duke of York and Albany	Prince Frederick	27 November 1784	Extinct in 1827
	Duke of Clarence and St Andrews	Prince William	19 May 1789	Merged with the Crown in 1830
	Duke of Kent and Strathearn	Prince Edward	23 April 1799	Extinct in 1820
	Duke of Cumberland and Teviotdale	Prince Ernest Augustus	23 April 1799	Deprived in 1919
	Duke of Sussex	Prince Augustus Frederick	24 November 1801	Extinct in 1843
	Duke of Cambridge	Prince Adolphus	24 November 1801	Extinct in 1904 (Note: The 2nd Duke died without legitimate male heirs.)
=== Reign of Queen Victoria ===
	Duke of Edinburgh	Prince Alfred	24 May 1866	Extinct in 1900
	Duke of Connaught and Strathearn	Prince Arthur	24 May 1874	Extinct in 1943 (Note: The 2nd Duke died without legitimate male heirs.)
	Duke of Albany	Prince Leopold	24 May 1881	Deprived in 1919
	Duke of Clarence and Avondale	Prince Albert Victor	24 May 1890	Extinct in 1892
	Duke of York	Prince George	24 May 1892	Created Prince of Wales in 1901; Merged with the Crown in 1910
=== Reign of King George V ===
	Duke of York	Prince Albert	3 June 1920	Merged with the Crown in 1936
	Duke of Gloucester	Prince Henry	30 March 1928	Extant (Note: Will cease to be a Royal dukedom on the death of the current Duke, but will continue as an "ordinary" dukedom.)
	Duke of Kent	Prince George	9 October 1934	Extant
=== Reign of King George VI ===
	Duke of Windsor	Prince Edward	8 March 1937	Extinct in 1972
	Duke of Edinburgh	Prince Philip	20 November 1947	Merged with the Crown in 2022
=== Reign of Queen Elizabeth II ===
	Duke of York	Prince Andrew	23 July 1986	Extant, not in use
	Duke of Cambridge	Prince William	29 April 2011	Created Prince of Wales in 2022; Extant
	Duke of Sussex	Prince Henry (Harry)	19 May 2018	Extant
=== Reign of King Charles III ===
	Duke of Edinburgh	Prince Edward	10 March 2023	Extant (Note: Dukedom was conferred as a life peerage and will become extinct on the death of the current Duke.)

== Forms of address ==
- Address: His/Her Royal Highness The Duke/Duchess of (X)
- Speak to as: Your Royal Highness
- After: Sir/Madam

== Coronet ==
While non-royal dukes are entitled to a coronet of eight strawberry leaves, to bear at a coronation and on his coat of arms, royal dukes are entitled to princely coronets (four cross pattées alternating with four strawberry leaves). The coronets of the royal family are dictated by letters patent. The Dukes of Sussex, of York and of Edinburgh bear by letters patent the coronet of a child of the sovereign (four crosses patées alternating with four fleurs-de-lis), while the Duke of Cornwall, Rothesay and Cambridge has use of the Prince of Wales' coronet, and the current dukes of Gloucester and of Kent, as grandsons of a sovereign bear the corresponding coronet of a royal duke.

At coronations, apart from the differentiation of princely coronets from ducal coronets, a royal duke is also entitled to six rows of ermine spots on his mantle, as opposed to the four rows borne by an "ordinary" duke.

Coronet of the Duke of Cornwall, Rothesay and Cambridge.

Coronet of the dukes of Sussex and of Edinburgh.

Coronet of the dukes of Gloucester and of Kent.

== Family tree ==
Family tree of British royal dukes

Includes dukes of: Albany, Albemarle, Bedford, Cambridge, Clarence, Connaught and Strathearn, Cumberland, Edinburgh, Gloucester, Gloucester and Edinburgh, Hereford, Kent, Kintyre and Lorne, Norfolk, Ross, Somerset, Sussex, Windsor, and York, but only when royally.

Non-royal dukes are not included; see Royal dukedoms in the United Kingdom.
Also not included are titles mandated for use by the heir apparent (Duke of Rothesay and the 1337 creation of the Duke of Cornwall), see Princes of Wales family tree.

King Robert II; 1316–1390	King Edward III; 1312–1377
Duke of Albany (1st creation), 1398	Duke of Clarence (1st creation), 1362	Duke of York (1st creation), 1385
King Robert III c. 1337–1406	Robert Stewart c. 1340–1420; 1st Duke of Albany	Edward the Black Prince; 1330–1376	Lionel of Antwerp; 1338–1368; Duke of Clarence	John of Gaunt; 1340–1399	Edmund; 1341–1402; 1st Duke of York
Dukedom of Clarence (1st creation) extinct, 1368
Duke of Cornwall (2nd creation), 1376	Duke of Hereford, 1397	Duke of Gloucester (1st creation), 1385
Murdoch Stewart c. 1362–1425; 2nd Duke of Albany	Richard of Bordeaux; 1367–1400; Duke of Cornwall, later King Richard II	Henry Bolingbroke; 1367–1413; Duke of Hereford, later King Henry IV	Thomas of Woodstock; 1355–1397; Duke of Gloucester
Dukedom of Albany (1st creation) forfeit, 1425	Dukedom of Cornwall (2nd creation) merged in the crown, 1377	Dukedom of Hereford merged in the crown, 1399	Dukedom of Gloucester (1st creation) extinct, 1397
Duke of Clarence (2nd creation), 1412	Duke of Bedford (1st & 2nd creations), 1414	Duke of Gloucester (2nd creation), 1414	Duke of Albemarle (Aumale) (1st creation), 1397
Thomas of Lancaster; 1387–1421; Duke of Clarence	John of Lancaster; 1389–1435; Duke of Bedford; Surrendered dukedom and then regranted, 1433	Humphrey of Lancaster; 1390–1447; Duke of Gloucester	John Beaufort; 1373–1410	Joan Beaufort c. 1379–1440	Edward of Norwich c. 1373–1415; Duke of Aumale, 2nd Duke of York	Richard of Conisburgh; 1385–1415
Dukedom of Clarence (2nd creation) extinct, 1421	Dukedom of Bedford (2nd creation) extinct, 1435	Dukedom of Gloucester (2nd creation) extinct, 1447	Dukedom of Albemarle (Aumale) (1st creation) forfeit, 1399
Duke of York (1st creation) restored, 1425; Duke of Cornwall (3rd creation), 1460
King James I 1394–1437	Joan Beaufort c. 1404–1445	Owen Tudor c. 1400–1461	John Beaufort; 1404–1444	Richard Neville; 1400–1460	Cecily Neville; 1415–1495	Richard of York; 1411–1460; 3rd Duke of York, Duke of Cornwall
Duke of Cornwall (3rd creation) extinct, 1460
Duke of Bedford (5th creation), 1485	Duke of Clarence (3rd creation), 1461	Duke of Gloucester (3rd creation), 1461
King James II; 1430–1460	Jasper Tudor c. 1431–1495; Duke of Bedford	Edmund Tudor c. 1430–1456	Lady Margaret Beaufort; 1443–1509	John Neville c. 1431–1471	Elizabeth Woodville c. 1437–1492	Edward; 1442–1483; 4th Duke of York, later King Edward IV	George Plantagenet; 1449–1478; Duke of Clarence	Richard of York; 1452–1485; Duke of Gloucester, later King Richard III
Dukedom of Bedford (5th creation) extinct, 1495	Dukedom of York (1st creation) merged in the Crown, 1461	Dukedom of Clarence (3rd creation) forfeit, 1478	Dukedom of Gloucester (3rd creation) merged in the Crown, 1483
Duke of Albany (2nd creation), 1458	Duke of Bedford (3rd creation), 1470	Duke of York (2nd creation), 1474; Duke of Norfolk (3rd creation), 1477	Duke of Bedford (4th creation), 1478
Alexander Stewart c. 1454–1485; 1st Duke of Albany	King James III; 1451/1452–1488	George Neville; 1457–1483; Duke of Bedford	King Henry VII; 1457–1509	Elizabeth of York; 1466–1503	Richard of Shrewsbury; 1473–1483; Duke of York, Duke of Norfolk	George of York; 1477–1479; Duke of Bedford
Dukedom of Bedford (3rd creation) forfeit, 1478	Dukedom of York (2nd creation) and Dukedom of Norfolk (3rd creation) extinct, 1483	Dukedom of Bedford (4th creation) extinct, 1479
Duke of Ross (1st creation), 1488	Duke of York (3rd creation), 1494	Duke of Somerset (3rd creation), 1499
John Stewart; 1482–1536; 2nd Duke of Albany	James Stewart; 1476–1504; Duke of Ross	King James IV; 1473–1513	Margaret Tudor; 1489–1541	Henry; 1491–1547; Duke of York, later King Henry VIII	Edmund Tudor; 1499–1500; Duke of Somerset (nominated but probably not invested)
Dukedom of Albany (2nd creation) extinct, 1536	Dukedom of Ross (1st creation) extinct, 1504	Dukedom of York (3rd creation) merged in the Crown, 1509	Dukedom of Somerset (3rd creation) extinct, 1500
Duke of Ross (2nd creation), 1514
King James V 1512–1542	Alexander Stewart; 1514–1515; Duke of Ross
Duke of Albany (3rd creation), 1565	Dukedom of Ross (2nd creation) extinct, 1515
Henry Stuart; 1546–1567; 1st Duke of Albany	Queen Mary; 1542–1587
James; 1566–1625; 2nd Duke of Albany, later King James VI & I
Dukedom of Albany (3rd creation) merged in the Crown, 1567
Duke of Albany (4th creation), 1604; Duke of York (4th creation), 1605	Duke of Kintyre and Lorne, 1602
Elizabeth Stuart; 1596–1662	Henry Frederick; 1594–1612	Charles; 1600–1649; Duke of Albany, Duke of York, later King Charles I	Robert Stuart; 1602; Duke of Kintyre and Lorne
Dukedom of Albany (4th creation), Dukedom of York (4th creation) merged in the Crown, 1625	Dukedom of Kintyre and Lorne extinct, 1602
Duke of York (5th creation) 1644; Duke of Albany (5th creation), 1660	Duke of Gloucester (4th creation), 1659
Sophia of Hanover; 1630–1714	James Stuart; 1633–1701; Duke of York, Duke of Albany, later King James VII & II	Henry; 1640–1660; Duke of Gloucester
Dukedom of Albany (5th creation) and Dukedom of York (5th creation) merged in the Crown, 1685	Dukedom of Gloucester (4th creation) extinct, 1660
Duke of York and Albany (1st creation), 1716	Duke of Cambridge (1st creation), 1664	Duke of Kendal (1st creation), 1666	Duke of Cambridge (2nd creation), 1667
King George I 1660–1727	Ernest Augustus; 1674–1728; Duke of York and Albany	Charles Stuart; 1660–1661 styled Duke of Cambridge	James Stuart; 1663–1667; Duke of Cambridge	Queen Anne; 1665–1714	Charles Stuart; 1666–1667 designated Duke of Kendal	Edgar Stuart; 1667–1671; Duke of Cambridge	Charles Stuart; 1677 styled Duke of Cambridge
Dukedom of York and Albany (1st creation) extinct, 1728	Dukedom of Cambridge (1st creation) extinct, 1667	Dukedom of Kendal (1st creation), extinct, 1667	Dukedom of Cambridge (2nd creation) extinct, 1671
Duke of Cambridge (3rd creation)
George; 1683–1760; Duke of Cambridge, later King George II	William; 1689–1700 styled Duke of Gloucester
Dukedom of Cambridge (3rd creation) merged with the Crown, 1727
Duke of Edinburgh (1st creation), 1726	Duke of Cumberland (3rd creation), 1726
Frederick; 1707–1751; 1st Duke of Edinburgh, styled Duke of Gloucester until created Duke of Edinburgh	William Augustus; 1721–1765; Duke of Cumberland
Dukedom of Cumberland (3rd creation) extinct, 1765
Duke of York and Albany (2nd creation), 1760	Duke of Gloucester and Edinburgh, 1764	Duke of Cumberland and Strathearn, 1766
George; 1738–1820; 2nd Duke of Edinburgh, later King George III	Edward; 1739–1767; Duke of York and Albany	William Henry; 1743–1805; 1st Duke of Gloucester and Edinburgh	Henry; 1745–1790; Duke of Cumberland and Strathearn
Dukedom of Edinburgh (1st creation), merged in the Crown, 1760	Dukedom of York and Albany (2nd creation) extinct, 1767	Dukedom of Cumberland and Strathearn extinct, 1790
Duke of York and Albany (3rd creation), 1784	Duke of Clarence and St Andrews, 1789	Duke of Kent and Strathearn, 1799	Duke of Cumberland and Teviotdale, 1799	Duke of Sussex (1st creation), 1801	Duke of Cambridge (4th creation), 1801
Frederick; 1763–1827; Duke of York and Albany	William Henry; 1765–1837, Duke of Clarence and St Andrews, later King William IV	Edward; 1767–1820; Duke of Kent and Strathearn	Ernest Augustus; 1771–1851; King of Hanover, 1st Duke of Cumberland and Teviotdale	Augustus Frederick; 1773–1843; Duke of Sussex	Adolphus; 1774–1850; 1st Duke of Cambridge	Mary; 1776–1857	William Frederick; 1776–1834; 2nd Duke of Gloucester and Edinburgh
Dukedom of York and Albany (3rd creation) extinct, 1827	Dukedom of Clarence and St Andrews merged in the Crown, 1830	Dukedom of Kent and Strathearn extinct, 1820	Dukedom of Sussex (1st creation) extinct, 1843	Dukedom of Gloucester and Edinburgh extinct, 1834
Queen Victoria; 1819–1901	George V 1819–1878; King of Hanover, 2nd Duke of Cumberland and Teviotdale	George; 1819–1904; 2nd Duke of Cambridge	Mary Adelaide; 1833–1897
Dukedom of Cambridge (4th creation) extinct, 1904
Duke of Edinburgh (2nd creation), 1866	Duke of Connaught and Strathearn, 1874	Duke of Albany (6th creation), 1881
King Edward VII; 1841–1910	Ernest Augustus; 1845–1923; 3rd Duke of Cumberland and Teviotdale	Alice; 1843–1878	Alfred Ernest Albert; 1844–1900; Duke of Edinburgh	Arthur; 1850–1942; 1st Duke of Connaught and Strathearn	Leopold; 1853–1884; 1st Duke of Albany
Dukedom of Cumberland and Teviotdale forfeit, 1919	Dukedom of Edinburgh (2nd creation) extinct, 1900
Duke of Clarence and Avondale, 1890	Duke of York (6th creation), 1892
Albert Victor; 1864–1892; Duke of Clarence and Avondale	George; 1865–1936; Duke of York, later King George V	Mary of Teck; 1867–1953	Victoria of Hesse and by Rhine; 1863–1950	Arthur of Connaught; 1883–1938
Dukedom of Clarence and Avondale extinct, 1892	Dukedom of York (6th creation) merged in the Crown, 1910
Duke of Windsor, 1937	Duke of York (7th creation), 1920	Duke of Kent (2nd creation), 1934	Duke of Gloucester (5th creation), 1928
King Edward VIII; 1894–1972; Later Duke of Windsor	Albert; 1895–1952; Duke of York, later King George VI	Alice of Battenberg; 1885–1969	George; 1902–1942; 1st Duke of Kent	Henry; 1900–1974; 1st Duke of Gloucester	Alastair Arthur; 1914–1943; 2nd Duke of Connaught and Strathearn	Charles Edward; 1884–1954; 2nd Duke of Albany
Dukedom of Windsor extinct, 1972	Dukedom of York (7th creation) merged in the Crown, 1936	Dukedom of Connaught and Strathearn extinct, 1943	Dukedom of Albany (6th creation) forfeit, 1919
Duke of Edinburgh (3rd creation), 1947
Queen Elizabeth II; 1926–2022	Philip; 1921–2021; 1st Duke of Edinburgh	Edward b. 1935; 2nd Duke of Kent
Duke of York (8th creation), 1986 (revoked 2025)	Duke of Edinburgh (4th creation), 2023
Charles b. 1948; 2nd Duke of Edinburgh, later King Charles III	Andrew b. 1960; Duke of York	Edward b. 1964; Duke of Edinburgh	George Windsor b. 1962	Richard b. 1944; 2nd Duke of Gloucester
Dukedom of Edinburgh (3rd creation) merged in the Crown, 2022	No male heirs	Dukedom of Edinburgh (4th creation) is a life peerage and therefore not hereditary	Heir apparent to the Dukedom of Kent
Duke of Cambridge (5th creation), 2011	Duke of Sussex (2nd creation), 2018
William b. 1982; Duke of Cambridge	Harry b. 1984; Duke of Sussex	Edward Windsor b. 1988	Alexander Windsor b. 1974
Heir-apparent to the Dukedom of Gloucester
George of Wales b. 2013	Archie of Sussex b. 2019
Heir apparent to the Dukedom of Cambridge	Heir apparent to the Dukedom of Sussex

== See also ==
- Substantive title
- Dukes in the United Kingdom
- List of dukedoms in the peerages of Britain and Ireland
- List of dukes in the peerages of Britain and Ireland
- Duchies in England
- List of peerages created for British princes
- Princess Royal
- Duke of Fife, Dukedom held by Princess Alexandra, 2nd Duchess of Fife
