= Duke of Ross =

Historic Scottish title

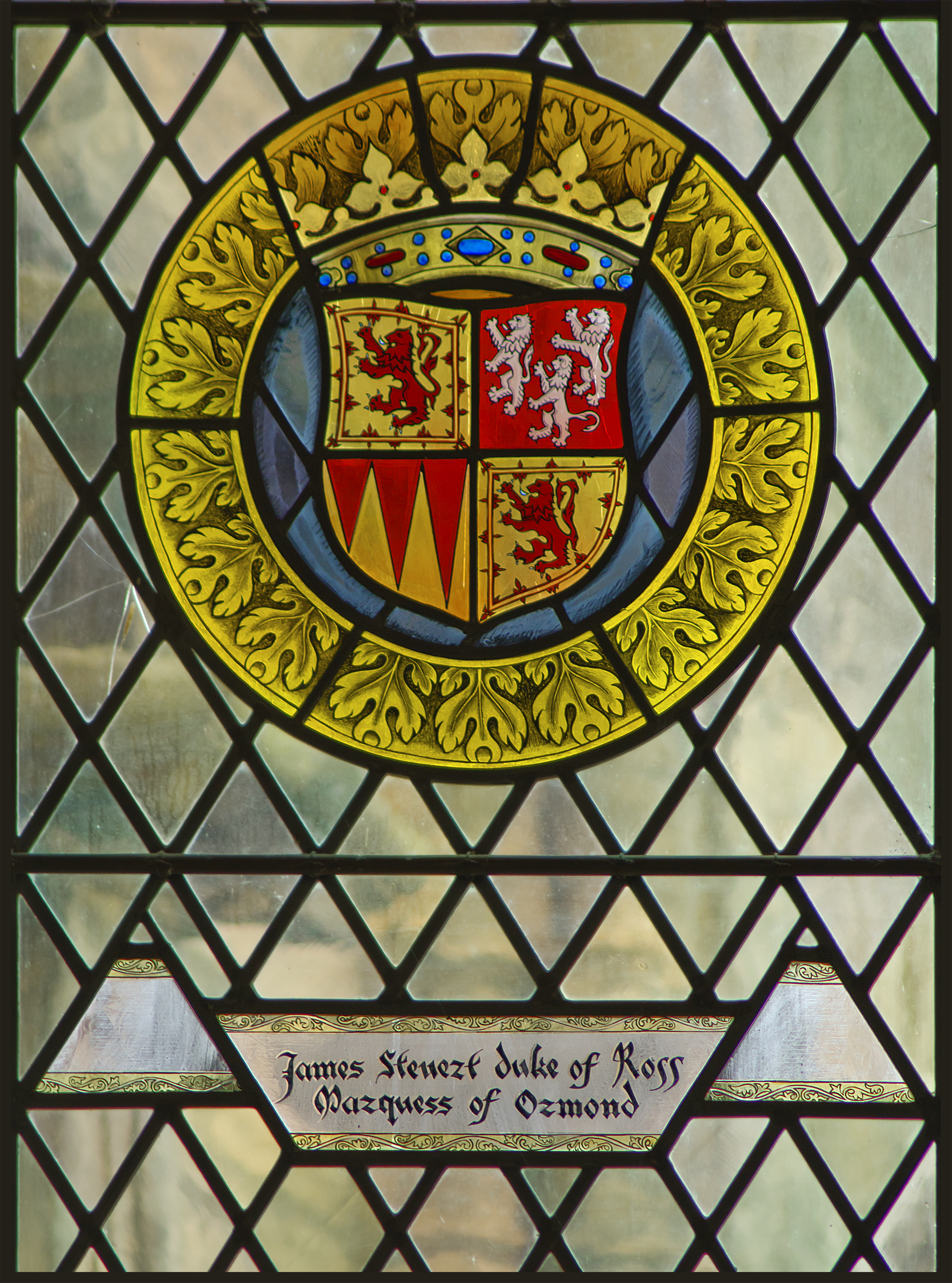
Arms in stained glass of James Stewart, Duke of Ross. The arms of Ross-shire (Gules, three lions rampant argent) are visible.

The title Duke of Ross (Scottish Gaelic: Diùc Rois) has been created twice in the Peerage of Scotland, both times for younger sons of the King of Scotland. Named for Ross in Scotland, it was first created in 1488 for James Stewart, Earl of Ross, the second son of James III. On his early death in 1504, the title became extinct.

The title was created a second time for Alexander Stewart, the youngest son of James IV. On his death at the age of one in 1515 the title became extinct.

== Dukes of Ross, first creation (1488) ==
Other titles: Marquess of Ormonde (1488), Earl of Ross, Earl of Ardmenach and Lord Brechin and Navar (1481)

- James Stewart, Duke of Ross (1476–1504), second son of James III

== Dukes of Ross, second creation (1514) ==
- Alexander Stewart, Duke of Ross (1514–1515), posthumous fourth and youngest son of James IV

== Family tree ==
Family tree of British royal dukes

Includes dukes of: Albany, Albemarle, Bedford, Cambridge, Clarence, Connaught and Strathearn, Cumberland, Edinburgh, Gloucester, Gloucester and Edinburgh, Hereford, Kent, Kintyre and Lorne, Norfolk, Ross, Somerset, Sussex, Windsor, and York, but only when royally.

Non-royal dukes are not included; see Royal dukedoms in the United Kingdom.
Also not included are titles mandated for use by the heir apparent (Duke of Rothesay and the 1337 creation of the Duke of Cornwall), see Princes of Wales family tree.

King Robert II; 1316–1390	King Edward III; 1312–1377
Duke of Albany (1st creation), 1398	Duke of Clarence (1st creation), 1362	Duke of York (1st creation), 1385
King Robert III c. 1337–1406	Robert Stewart c. 1340–1420; 1st Duke of Albany	Edward the Black Prince; 1330–1376	Lionel of Antwerp; 1338–1368; Duke of Clarence	John of Gaunt; 1340–1399	Edmund; 1341–1402; 1st Duke of York
Dukedom of Clarence (1st creation) extinct, 1368
Duke of Cornwall (2nd creation), 1376	Duke of Hereford, 1397	Duke of Gloucester (1st creation), 1385
Murdoch Stewart c. 1362–1425; 2nd Duke of Albany	Richard of Bordeaux; 1367–1400; Duke of Cornwall, later King Richard II	Henry Bolingbroke; 1367–1413; Duke of Hereford, later King Henry IV	Thomas of Woodstock; 1355–1397; Duke of Gloucester
Dukedom of Albany (1st creation) forfeit, 1425	Dukedom of Cornwall (2nd creation) merged in the crown, 1377	Dukedom of Hereford merged in the crown, 1399	Dukedom of Gloucester (1st creation) extinct, 1397
Duke of Clarence (2nd creation), 1412	Duke of Bedford (1st & 2nd creations), 1414	Duke of Gloucester (2nd creation), 1414	Duke of Albemarle (Aumale) (1st creation), 1397
Thomas of Lancaster; 1387–1421; Duke of Clarence	John of Lancaster; 1389–1435; Duke of Bedford; Surrendered dukedom and then regranted, 1433	Humphrey of Lancaster; 1390–1447; Duke of Gloucester	John Beaufort; 1373–1410	Joan Beaufort c. 1379–1440	Edward of Norwich c. 1373–1415; Duke of Aumale, 2nd Duke of York	Richard of Conisburgh; 1385–1415
Dukedom of Clarence (2nd creation) extinct, 1421	Dukedom of Bedford (2nd creation) extinct, 1435	Dukedom of Gloucester (2nd creation) extinct, 1447	Dukedom of Albemarle (Aumale) (1st creation) forfeit, 1399
Duke of York (1st creation) restored, 1425; Duke of Cornwall (3rd creation), 1460
King James I 1394–1437	Joan Beaufort c. 1404–1445	Owen Tudor c. 1400–1461	John Beaufort; 1404–1444	Richard Neville; 1400–1460	Cecily Neville; 1415–1495	Richard of York; 1411–1460; 3rd Duke of York, Duke of Cornwall
Duke of Cornwall (3rd creation) extinct, 1460
Duke of Bedford (5th creation), 1485	Duke of Clarence (3rd creation), 1461	Duke of Gloucester (3rd creation), 1461
King James II; 1430–1460	Jasper Tudor c. 1431–1495; Duke of Bedford	Edmund Tudor c. 1430–1456	Lady Margaret Beaufort; 1443–1509	John Neville c. 1431–1471	Elizabeth Woodville c. 1437–1492	Edward; 1442–1483; 4th Duke of York, later King Edward IV	George Plantagenet; 1449–1478; Duke of Clarence	Richard of York; 1452–1485; Duke of Gloucester, later King Richard III
Dukedom of Bedford (5th creation) extinct, 1495	Dukedom of York (1st creation) merged in the Crown, 1461	Dukedom of Clarence (3rd creation) forfeit, 1478	Dukedom of Gloucester (3rd creation) merged in the Crown, 1483
Duke of Albany (2nd creation), 1458	Duke of Bedford (3rd creation), 1470	Duke of York (2nd creation), 1474; Duke of Norfolk (3rd creation), 1477	Duke of Bedford (4th creation), 1478
Alexander Stewart c. 1454–1485; 1st Duke of Albany	King James III; 1451/1452–1488	George Neville; 1457–1483; Duke of Bedford	King Henry VII; 1457–1509	Elizabeth of York; 1466–1503	Richard of Shrewsbury; 1473–1483; Duke of York, Duke of Norfolk	George of York; 1477–1479; Duke of Bedford
Dukedom of Bedford (3rd creation) forfeit, 1478	Dukedom of York (2nd creation) and Dukedom of Norfolk (3rd creation) extinct, 1483	Dukedom of Bedford (4th creation) extinct, 1479
Duke of Ross (1st creation), 1488	Duke of York (3rd creation), 1494	Duke of Somerset (3rd creation), 1499
John Stewart; 1482–1536; 2nd Duke of Albany	James Stewart; 1476–1504; Duke of Ross	King James IV; 1473–1513	Margaret Tudor; 1489–1541	Henry; 1491–1547; Duke of York, later King Henry VIII	Edmund Tudor; 1499–1500; Duke of Somerset (nominated but probably not invested)
Dukedom of Albany (2nd creation) extinct, 1536	Dukedom of Ross (1st creation) extinct, 1504	Dukedom of York (3rd creation) merged in the Crown, 1509	Dukedom of Somerset (3rd creation) extinct, 1500
Duke of Ross (2nd creation), 1514
King James V 1512–1542	Alexander Stewart; 1514–1515; Duke of Ross
Duke of Albany (3rd creation), 1565	Dukedom of Ross (2nd creation) extinct, 1515
Henry Stuart; 1546–1567; 1st Duke of Albany	Queen Mary; 1542–1587
James; 1566–1625; 2nd Duke of Albany, later King James VI & I
Dukedom of Albany (3rd creation) merged in the Crown, 1567
Duke of Albany (4th creation), 1604; Duke of York (4th creation), 1605	Duke of Kintyre and Lorne, 1602
Elizabeth Stuart; 1596–1662	Henry Frederick; 1594–1612	Charles; 1600–1649; Duke of Albany, Duke of York, later King Charles I	Robert Stuart; 1602; Duke of Kintyre and Lorne
Dukedom of Albany (4th creation), Dukedom of York (4th creation) merged in the Crown, 1625	Dukedom of Kintyre and Lorne extinct, 1602
Duke of York (5th creation) 1644; Duke of Albany (5th creation), 1660	Duke of Gloucester (4th creation), 1659
Sophia of Hanover; 1630–1714	James Stuart; 1633–1701; Duke of York, Duke of Albany, later King James VII & II	Henry; 1640–1660; Duke of Gloucester
Dukedom of Albany (5th creation) and Dukedom of York (5th creation) merged in the Crown, 1685	Dukedom of Gloucester (4th creation) extinct, 1660
Duke of York and Albany (1st creation), 1716	Duke of Cambridge (1st creation), 1664	Duke of Kendal (1st creation), 1666	Duke of Cambridge (2nd creation), 1667
King George I 1660–1727	Ernest Augustus; 1674–1728; Duke of York and Albany	Charles Stuart; 1660–1661 styled Duke of Cambridge	James Stuart; 1663–1667; Duke of Cambridge	Queen Anne; 1665–1714	Charles Stuart; 1666–1667 designated Duke of Kendal	Edgar Stuart; 1667–1671; Duke of Cambridge	Charles Stuart; 1677 styled Duke of Cambridge
Dukedom of York and Albany (1st creation) extinct, 1728	Dukedom of Cambridge (1st creation) extinct, 1667	Dukedom of Kendal (1st creation), extinct, 1667	Dukedom of Cambridge (2nd creation) extinct, 1671
Duke of Cambridge (3rd creation)
George; 1683–1760; Duke of Cambridge, later King George II	William; 1689–1700 styled Duke of Gloucester
Dukedom of Cambridge (3rd creation) merged with the Crown, 1727
Duke of Edinburgh (1st creation), 1726	Duke of Cumberland (3rd creation), 1726
Frederick; 1707–1751; 1st Duke of Edinburgh, styled Duke of Gloucester until created Duke of Edinburgh	William Augustus; 1721–1765; Duke of Cumberland
Dukedom of Cumberland (3rd creation) extinct, 1765
Duke of York and Albany (2nd creation), 1760	Duke of Gloucester and Edinburgh, 1764	Duke of Cumberland and Strathearn, 1766
George; 1738–1820; 2nd Duke of Edinburgh, later King George III	Edward; 1739–1767; Duke of York and Albany	William Henry; 1743–1805; 1st Duke of Gloucester and Edinburgh	Henry; 1745–1790; Duke of Cumberland and Strathearn
Dukedom of Edinburgh (1st creation), merged in the Crown, 1760	Dukedom of York and Albany (2nd creation) extinct, 1767	Dukedom of Cumberland and Strathearn extinct, 1790
Duke of York and Albany (3rd creation), 1784	Duke of Clarence and St Andrews, 1789	Duke of Kent and Strathearn, 1799	Duke of Cumberland and Teviotdale, 1799	Duke of Sussex (1st creation), 1801	Duke of Cambridge (4th creation), 1801
Frederick; 1763–1827; Duke of York and Albany	William Henry; 1765–1837, Duke of Clarence and St Andrews, later King William IV	Edward; 1767–1820; Duke of Kent and Strathearn	Ernest Augustus; 1771–1851; King of Hanover, 1st Duke of Cumberland and Teviotdale	Augustus Frederick; 1773–1843; Duke of Sussex	Adolphus; 1774–1850; 1st Duke of Cambridge	Mary; 1776–1857	William Frederick; 1776–1834; 2nd Duke of Gloucester and Edinburgh
Dukedom of York and Albany (3rd creation) extinct, 1827	Dukedom of Clarence and St Andrews merged in the Crown, 1830	Dukedom of Kent and Strathearn extinct, 1820	Dukedom of Sussex (1st creation) extinct, 1843	Dukedom of Gloucester and Edinburgh extinct, 1834
Queen Victoria; 1819–1901	George V 1819–1878; King of Hanover, 2nd Duke of Cumberland and Teviotdale	George; 1819–1904; 2nd Duke of Cambridge	Mary Adelaide; 1833–1897
Dukedom of Cambridge (4th creation) extinct, 1904
Duke of Edinburgh (2nd creation), 1866	Duke of Connaught and Strathearn, 1874	Duke of Albany (6th creation), 1881
King Edward VII; 1841–1910	Ernest Augustus; 1845–1923; 3rd Duke of Cumberland and Teviotdale	Alice; 1843–1878	Alfred Ernest Albert; 1844–1900; Duke of Edinburgh	Arthur; 1850–1942; 1st Duke of Connaught and Strathearn	Leopold; 1853–1884; 1st Duke of Albany
Dukedom of Cumberland and Teviotdale forfeit, 1919	Dukedom of Edinburgh (2nd creation) extinct, 1900
Duke of Clarence and Avondale, 1890	Duke of York (6th creation), 1892
Albert Victor; 1864–1892; Duke of Clarence and Avondale	George; 1865–1936; Duke of York, later King George V	Mary of Teck; 1867–1953	Victoria of Hesse and by Rhine; 1863–1950	Arthur of Connaught; 1883–1938
Dukedom of Clarence and Avondale extinct, 1892	Dukedom of York (6th creation) merged in the Crown, 1910
Duke of Windsor, 1937	Duke of York (7th creation), 1920	Duke of Kent (2nd creation), 1934	Duke of Gloucester (5th creation), 1928
King Edward VIII; 1894–1972; Later Duke of Windsor	Albert; 1895–1952; Duke of York, later King George VI	Alice of Battenberg; 1885–1969	George; 1902–1942; 1st Duke of Kent	Henry; 1900–1974; 1st Duke of Gloucester	Alastair Arthur; 1914–1943; 2nd Duke of Connaught and Strathearn	Charles Edward; 1884–1954; 2nd Duke of Albany
Dukedom of Windsor extinct, 1972	Dukedom of York (7th creation) merged in the Crown, 1936	Dukedom of Connaught and Strathearn extinct, 1943	Dukedom of Albany (6th creation) forfeit, 1919
Duke of Edinburgh (3rd creation), 1947
Queen Elizabeth II; 1926–2022	Philip; 1921–2021; 1st Duke of Edinburgh	Edward b. 1935; 2nd Duke of Kent
Duke of York (8th creation), 1986 (revoked 2025)	Duke of Edinburgh (4th creation), 2023
Charles b. 1948; 2nd Duke of Edinburgh, later King Charles III	Andrew b. 1960; Duke of York	Edward b. 1964; Duke of Edinburgh	George Windsor b. 1962	Richard b. 1944; 2nd Duke of Gloucester
Dukedom of Edinburgh (3rd creation) merged in the Crown, 2022	No male heirs	Dukedom of Edinburgh (4th creation) is a life peerage and therefore not hereditary	Heir apparent to the Dukedom of Kent
Duke of Cambridge (5th creation), 2011	Duke of Sussex (2nd creation), 2018
William b. 1982; Duke of Cambridge	Harry b. 1984; Duke of Sussex	Edward Windsor b. 1988	Alexander Windsor b. 1974
Heir-apparent to the Dukedom of Gloucester
George of Wales b. 2013	Archie of Sussex b. 2019
Heir apparent to the Dukedom of Cambridge	Heir apparent to the Dukedom of Sussex

Family tree of the: Earls of Angus, Earls of Avondale, Earls of Douglas, Marquesses of Douglas, Earls of Forfar, Earls of Ormond and Marquesses of Ormond, Earls of Ross and Dukes of Ross

Earl of Angus (Stewart line) and Lord of Bonkyl, 1329
John Stewart d. 1331; 1st Earl of Angus, etc., Lord of Abernethy jure uxoris	William the Hardy; 1243–1298; Lord of Douglas
Thomas Stewart b. before 1331–1361; 2nd Earl of Angus, etc.	Archibald Douglas d. 1333	James Douglas "the Good" c. 1286–1330; Lord of Douglas
Earl of Douglas, 1358
Robert III c. 1337–1406; King of Scotland	Margaret Stewart d. 1417; 3rd Countess of Angus, etc.	William Douglas c. 1323–1384; 1st Earl of Douglas	Archibald Douglas "the Grim" c. 1330 – c. 1400; 3rd Earl of Douglas, Earl of Wigtown, Lord of Galloway, Lord of Douglas, Lord of Bothwell
Earl of Angus transferred from the Stewarts to the Douglasses when Margaret resigned her title in deference to her son, 1389	Earl of Avondale and Lord Balveny, 1437
James I 1394–1437; King of Scotland	Mary Stewart c. 1380–c. 1460	George Douglas; 1380–1430; 1st Earl of Angus, etc.	James Douglas c. 1358–1388; 2nd Earl of Douglas, Earl of Mar	Archibald Douglas "Tyneman" c. 1369–1424; Duke of Touraine, 4th Earl of Douglas, Earl of Wigtown, 13th Lord of Douglas, Lord of Galloway, Lord of Douglas, Lord of Bothwell m. Margaret of Carrick, daughter of Robert III	James Douglas; 1371–1443; 7th Earl of Douglas, 1st Earl of Avondale, etc.
William Douglas; 1398–1437; 2nd Earl of Angus, etc.	Douglases of Drumlanrig	Archibald Douglas c. 1391–1439; Duke of Touraine, 5th Earl of Douglas, Earl of Wigtown, Lord of Galloway, Lord of Douglas, Lord of Bothwell, Lord of Selkirk and Ettrick Forest, Eskdale, Lauderdale, Liddesdale and Annandale, Count of Longueville, Seigneur de Dun-le-roi
Earl of Ormond (Scotland) (1st creation), 1445
James II; 1430–1460; King of Scotland	James Douglas; 1428–1446; 3rd Earl of Angus, etc.	George Douglas c. 1427–1463; 4th Earl of Angus, etc.	William Douglas c. 1424–1440; Duke of Touraine, 6th Earl of Douglas, Earl of Wigtown, Lord of Galloway, Lord of Bothwell, Lord of Selkirk and Ettrick Forest, Eskdale, Lauderdale, and Annandale, Count of Longueville, Seigneur de Dun-le-roi	William Douglas; 1425–1452; 8th Earl of Douglas, 2nd Earl of Avondale, etc.	James Douglas; 1426–1491; 9th Earl of Douglas, 3rd Earl of Avondale, etc.	Hugh Douglas d. 1455; Earl of Ormond
Earldom of Douglas and Earldom of Avondale forfeit, 1491	Eardom of Ormand forfeit, 1455
James III; 1451/1452–1448; King of Scotland	Archibald Douglas c. 1449–1513; 5th Earl of Angus, etc.
Marquess of Ormond (Scotland) (1st creation), 1476; Earl of Ross, 1481; Duke of Ross, 1488
James IV; 1473–1513; King of Scotland	James Stewart; 1476–1504; Duke of Ross, etc.	George Douglas; 1469–1513 styled Master of Angus	William Douglas of Glenbervie; 1473–1513
Dukedom of Ross (1488 creation), Marqessate of Ormond (1st creation) and Earldom of Ross (1481 creation) extinct, 1504
Duke of Ross (2nd creation), 1514
James V 1512–1542; King of Scotland	Alexander Stewart; 1514–1515; Duke of Ross	Archibald Douglas; 1490–1557; 6th Earl of Angus, etc.	George Douglas of Pittendreich d. 1552	Archibald Douglas of Glenbervie; 1513–1570
Dukedom of Ross (2nd creation) extinct, 1515	Earl of Ross (1565 creation)
Mary; 1542–1587; Queen of Scotland	Henry Stuart; 1546–1567; Duke of Albany, 1st Earl of Ross, Lord Darnley, Lord Ardmannoch	David Douglas c. 1515–1558; 7th Earl of Angus, etc.	William Douglas; 1533–1591; 9th Earl of Angus, etc.
James VI and I 1566–1625; 2nd Earl of Ross, later King of Scotland	Archibald Douglas; 1555–1588; 8th Earl of Angus, etc., Earl of Morton	William Douglas; 1553–1611; 10th Earl of Angus, etc.
Earldom of Ross (1565 creation), merged with the crown
Marquess of Ormond (Scotland) (2nd creation), Earl of Ross, and Lord Ardmannoch, 1600	Earldom of Angus (1389 creation) resigned in favor of: Marquess of Douglas, Earl of Angus, Lord Abernethy, Lord Bonkyll and Preston, Lord Abernethy, and Lord Jedburgh Forest, 1633
Elizabeth Stuart; 1596–1662	Charles Stuart; 1600–1649; Marquess of Ormond, etc., Later King Charles I of England and Scotland	William Douglas; 1589–1660; 1st Marquess of Douglas, etc. 11th Earl of Angus, etc. (1389 creation)
Marquessate of Ormand (2nd creation) and Earldom of Ross (1600 creation) merged with the Crown, 1625
Earl of Ormond (Scotland) (2nd creation), 1651
Sophia of Hanover; 1630–1714	Archibald Douglas; 1609–1655; 1st Earl of Ormond
Earl of Forfar (1st creation), 1661
King George I 1660–1727	James Douglas c. 1646–1700; 2nd Marquess of Douglas, etc.	Archibald Douglas; 1653–1712; 2nd Earl of Ormond, 1st Earl of Forfar
Duke of Douglas, Marquess of Angus and Abernethy, Viscount of Jedburgh Forest, Lord Douglas of Bonkill, Prestoun, and Robertoun, 1703
King George II; 1683–1760	Archibald Douglas; 1694–1761; 1st Duke of Douglas, etc., 3rd Marquess of Douglas, etc.	Archibald Douglas; 1692–1715; 3rd Earl of Ormond, 2nd Earl of Forfar
Dukedom of Douglas, marquessate of Angus and Abernethy, and viscountcy of Jedburgh Forest, lordship Douglas of Bonkill, Prestoun, and Robertoun extinct, 1761; Marquessate of Douglas, earldom of Angus, and lordship of Abernethy and Jedburgh Forest passed to James Hamilton, 7th Duke of Hamilton	Earldoms of Ormond and Forfar extinct, 1715
Frederick; 1707–1751; Prince of Wales
King George III; 1683–1760
Edward Augustus; 1767–1820; Duke of Kent and Strathearn
Queen Victoria; 1819–1901
King Edward VII; 1841–1910
Duke of Clarence and Avondale and Earl of Athlone, 1890
Prince Albert Victor; 1864–1892; Duke of Clarence and Avondale, etc.	King George V 1865–1936
Dukedom of Clarence and Avondale and Earldom of Athlone extinct, 1892
King George VI; 1895–1952
Queen Elizabeth II; 1926–2022
Earl of Forfar (2nd creation), 2019
Prince Edward b. 1964; Duke of Edinburgh, Earl of Forfar
