= Duke of Clarence =

Title traditionally awarded to members of the English and British Royal families

Dukedom of Clarence
- Arms of George Plantagenet, 1st Duke of Clarence (third creation): Quarterly, 1st and 4th, France modern, 2nd and 3rd England, with a label of three points Argent each point charged with a canton Gules
- Creation date: 1362 (first creation); 1412 (second creation); 1461 (third creation)
- Created by: Edward III (first creation); Henry IV (second creation); Edward IV (third creation)
- Peerage: Peerage of England
- First holder: Lionel of Antwerp, 1st Duke of Clarence
- Last holder: Prince Albert Victor, Duke of Clarence and Avondale
- Subsidiary titles: First creation: Earl of Ulster; Second creation: Earl of Aumale; Third creation: Earl of Warwick; Earl of Salisbury
- Extinction date: 1368 (first creation); 1421 (second creation); 1478 (third creation)

Duke of Clarence was a substantive title created three times in the Peerage of England. The title Duke of Clarence and St Andrews has also been created in the Peerage of Great Britain, and Duke of Clarence and Avondale and Earl of Clarence in the Peerage of the United Kingdom. The titles have traditionally been awarded to junior members of the English and British royal family, and all are now extinct.

== History ==
In 1360, the Honour of Clare was inherited by Elizabeth de Burgh, Countess of Ulster. In 1362, the title of Duke of Clarence was created for her husband Lionel of Antwerp, the second son of King Edward III. Since he died without sons, the title became extinct.

The title was again created in favour of Thomas of Lancaster, the second son of King Henry IV, in 1412. Upon his death, too, the title became extinct.

The last creation in the Peerage of England was for George Plantagenet, brother of King Edward IV, in 1461. The Duke forfeited his title in 1478, after he had been convicted of treason against his brother. He allegedly met his end by being drowned in a butt of Malmsey (according to William Shakespeare).

A fourth creation in England was suggested and planned to take effect; the title of Duke of Clarence was going to be given to Lord Guilford Dudley, husband of Lady Jane Grey, upon her coronation, as she declined to make her husband king. However, she was deposed before this could take effect.

Two double dukedoms, of Clarence and St Andrews and of Clarence and Avondale, were later created for British royal princes. The title also took the form of an earldom for Queen Victoria's son Prince Leopold, Duke of Albany, and his son Prince Charles Edward, the Clarence earldom being a subsidiary title.

== Nomenclature ==
The title does not refer to the minor River Clarence in Pas-de-Calais, northern France, but is said by Polydore Vergil to originate from the manor and castle of Clare in Suffolk, the Caput baroniae of a feudal barony, which was held by Lionel of Antwerp, 1st Duke of Clarence, in right of his wife, the heiress Elizabeth de Burgh, 4th Countess of Ulster, ultimate descendant and heiress of the previous holder, the de Clare family; Clare was among the many estates which she brought to her husband. After the Union of the Crowns in 1603, the holders of the title were also given titles named after Scottish places: St Andrews and Avondale.

== Duke of Clarence, first creation (1362) ==
The title was first created for Lionel, a younger son of King Edward III who in 1352 had married Elizabeth de Burgh, 4th Countess of Ulster, the sole heiress via a female line of Gilbert de Clare, 8th Earl of Gloucester. The name Clarence referred to the feudal barony of Clare in Suffolk, and as the holder of it (and others) by right of his wife Lionel was given that title.

Duke	Portrait	Birth	Marriage(s)	Death	Arms
Lionel of Antwerp, Duke of Clarence also: Earl of Ulster (1264 jure uxoris)	Lionel of Antwerp	29 November 1338; Antwerp, Duchy of Brabant (now Belgium) son of King Edward III and Philippa of Hainault	Elizabeth de Burgh, 4th Countess of Ulster; 15 August 1352 - 10 December 1363; 1 child Violante Visconti; 28 May 1368 no children	7 October 1368; Alba, Piedmont aged 29	
Lionel had no legitimate sons and all his titles became extinct on his death.

== Duke of Clarence, second creation (1412) ==
Duke	Portrait	Birth	Marriage(s)	Death	Arms
Thomas of Lancaster, Duke of Clarence also: Earl of Aumale (1412)	Drawing of tomb effigy of Thomas of Lancaster, 1st Duke of Clarence	Autumn 1387 son of Henry IV of England and Mary de Bohun	Margaret Holland; 1411 no children	22 March 1421; Battle of Baugé, Anjou, France aged 33	
Thomas had no legitimate sons and all his titles became extinct on his death.

== Duke of Clarence, third creation (1461) ==
Duke	Portrait	Birth	Marriage(s)	Death	Arms
George Plantagenet, Duke of Clarence also: Earl of Warwick and Earl of Salisbury (1472)	George Plantagenet	21 October 1449; Dublin Castle, Ireland son of Richard Plantagenet, 3rd Duke of York and Cecily Neville, Duchess of York	Isabel Neville; 11 July 1469; 4 children	18 February 1478; Tower of London, London aged 28	
Executed for treason in 1478 and honours forfeited.

== Similar titles ==
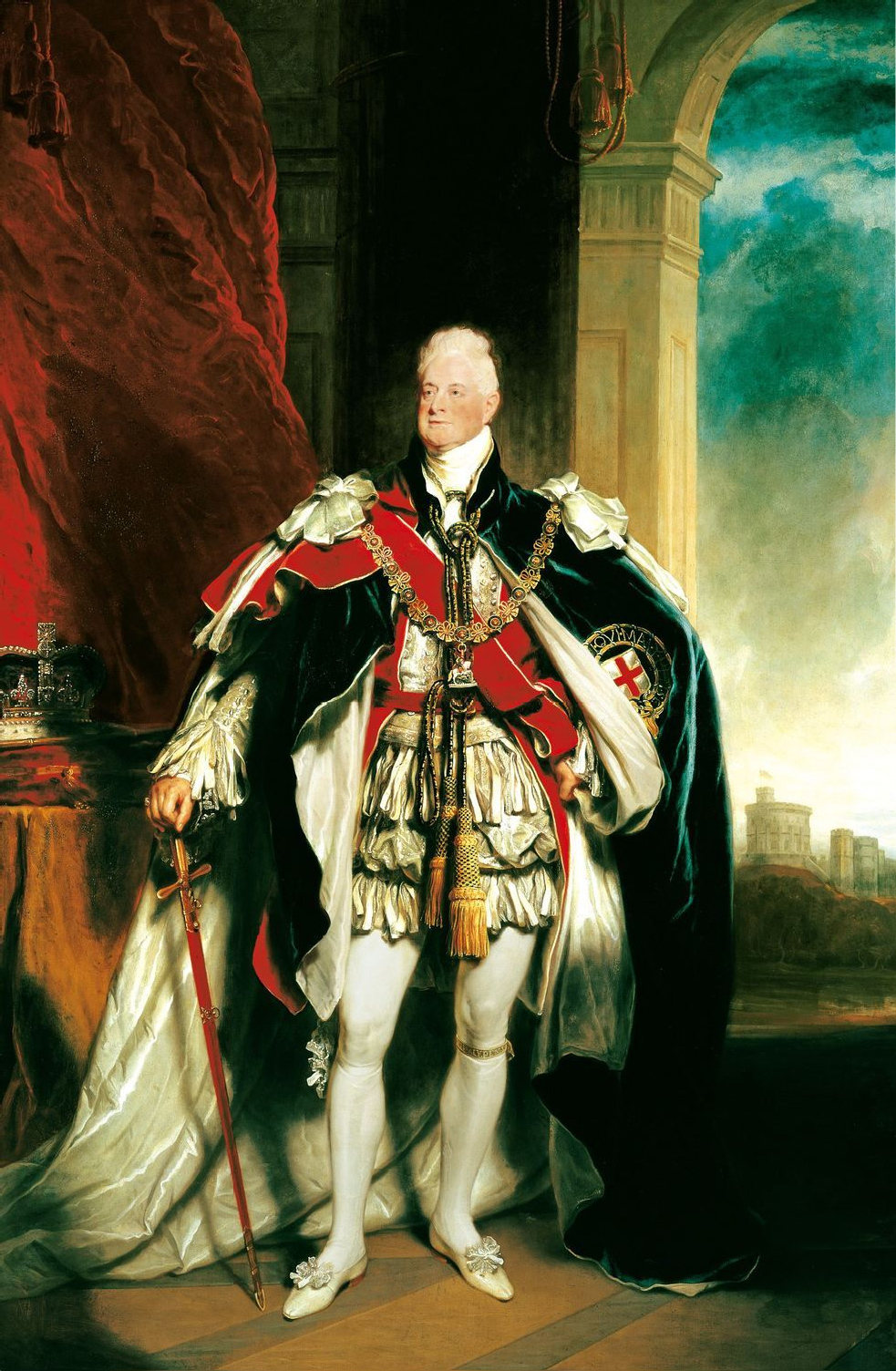
William IV was styled "HRH The Duke of Clarence" between his creation in 1789 and his accession in 1830

=== Earls of Clarence (1881) ===
- The Prince Leopold, 1st Duke of Albany, 1st Earl of Clarence & 1st Baron Arklow (1853–1884), fourth son of Queen Victoria.
- Charles Edward, Duke of Saxe-Coburg and Gotha, 2nd Duke of Albany, 2nd Earl of Clarence & 2nd Baron Arklow (1884–1954), posthumous son of the 1st Earl, had his British titles suspended in 1919 for waging war against Britain.
  - For heirs to the suspended peerages, see Duke of Albany.

=== Duke of Clarence and St Andrews (1789) ===
- Prince William Henry, later William IV (1765–1837), who became king in 1830, at which point the title merged with the Crown.

=== Duke of Clarence and Avondale (1890) ===
- Prince Albert Victor, 1st Duke of Clarence and Avondale (1864–1892)

== Family tree ==
Family Tree of the Dukes of Clarence, Clarence and Avondale, and Clarence and St Andrews

Edward III; 1312–1377; King of England
Duke of Clarence (1st creation), 1362
Lionel of Antwerp; 1338–1368; Duke of Clarence	Edmund of Langley; 1341–1402	John of Gaunt; 1340–1399; Duke of Lancaster
Dukedom (1st creation) extinct, 1368
Philippa; 1355–1382; Countess of Ulster	Henry IV; 1367–1413; King of England
Duke of Clarence (2nd creation), 1412
Roger Mortimer; 1374–1398; Earl of March	Thomas of Lancaster; 1388–1421; Duke of Clarence
Dukedom (2nd creation) extinct, 1421
Anne de Mortimer; 1390–1411	Richard of Conisburgh; 1385–1415
Richard of York; 1411–1460; Duke of York
Duke of Clarence (3rd creation), 1461
Edward IV; 1442–1483; King of England	George Plantagenet; 1449–1478; Duke of Clarence
Dukedom (3rd creation) extinct, 1478
Elizabeth of York; 1466–1503	Henry VII; 1457–1509; King of England
Princess Margaret Tudor; 1489–1541	James IV; King of Scotland
James V 1512–1542; King of Scotland
Mary; 1542–1587; Queen of Scotland
James VI & I 1566–1625; King of Scotland and England
Frederick V of the Palatinate	Princess Elizabeth Stuart; 1596–1662
Sophia of Hanover; 1630–1714	Ernest Augustus of Brunswick
George I 1660–1727; King of Great Britain
George II; 1683–1760; King of Great Britain
Prince Frederick Louis; 1707–1751; Prince of Wales
George III; 1738–1820; King of the United Kingdom
Duke of Clarence and St Andrews, 1789
Prince William Henry; 1765–1837; Duke of Clarence and St Andrews later King of the United Kingdom	Prince Edward; 1767–1820; Duke of Kent and Strathearn
Dukedom merged into the Crown, 1830
Victoria; 1819–1901; Queen of the United Kingdom
Earl of Clarence, 1881
Edward VII; 1841–1910; King of the United Kingdom	Prince Leopold; 1853–1884; Duke of Albany; 1st Earl of Clarence
Duke of Clarence and Avondale, 1890
Prince Albert Victor; 1864–1892; Duke of Clarence and Avondale	Charles Edward; 1884–1954; Duke of Saxe-Coburg and Gotha; Duke of Albany; 2nd Earl of Clarence
Dukedom extinct, 1892	Honours forfeit, 1919

Family tree of British royal dukes

Includes dukes of: Albany, Albemarle, Bedford, Cambridge, Clarence, Connaught and Strathearn, Cumberland, Edinburgh, Gloucester, Gloucester and Edinburgh, Hereford, Kent, Kintyre and Lorne, Norfolk, Ross, Somerset, Sussex, Windsor, and York, but only when royally.

Non-royal dukes are not included; see Royal dukedoms in the United Kingdom.
Also not included are titles mandated for use by the heir apparent (Duke of Rothesay and the 1337 creation of the Duke of Cornwall), see Princes of Wales family tree.

King Robert II; 1316–1390	King Edward III; 1312–1377
Duke of Albany (1st creation), 1398	Duke of Clarence (1st creation), 1362	Duke of York (1st creation), 1385
King Robert III c. 1337–1406	Robert Stewart c. 1340–1420; 1st Duke of Albany	Edward the Black Prince; 1330–1376	Lionel of Antwerp; 1338–1368; Duke of Clarence	John of Gaunt; 1340–1399	Edmund; 1341–1402; 1st Duke of York
Dukedom of Clarence (1st creation) extinct, 1368
Duke of Cornwall (2nd creation), 1376	Duke of Hereford, 1397	Duke of Gloucester (1st creation), 1385
Murdoch Stewart c. 1362–1425; 2nd Duke of Albany	Richard of Bordeaux; 1367–1400; Duke of Cornwall, later King Richard II	Henry Bolingbroke; 1367–1413; Duke of Hereford, later King Henry IV	Thomas of Woodstock; 1355–1397; Duke of Gloucester
Dukedom of Albany (1st creation) forfeit, 1425	Dukedom of Cornwall (2nd creation) merged in the crown, 1377	Dukedom of Hereford merged in the crown, 1399	Dukedom of Gloucester (1st creation) extinct, 1397
Duke of Clarence (2nd creation), 1412	Duke of Bedford (1st & 2nd creations), 1414	Duke of Gloucester (2nd creation), 1414	Duke of Albemarle (Aumale) (1st creation), 1397
Thomas of Lancaster; 1387–1421; Duke of Clarence	John of Lancaster; 1389–1435; Duke of Bedford; Surrendered dukedom and then regranted, 1433	Humphrey of Lancaster; 1390–1447; Duke of Gloucester	John Beaufort; 1373–1410	Joan Beaufort c. 1379–1440	Edward of Norwich c. 1373–1415; Duke of Aumale, 2nd Duke of York	Richard of Conisburgh; 1385–1415
Dukedom of Clarence (2nd creation) extinct, 1421	Dukedom of Bedford (2nd creation) extinct, 1435	Dukedom of Gloucester (2nd creation) extinct, 1447	Dukedom of Albemarle (Aumale) (1st creation) forfeit, 1399
Duke of York (1st creation) restored, 1425; Duke of Cornwall (3rd creation), 1460
King James I 1394–1437	Joan Beaufort c. 1404–1445	Owen Tudor c. 1400–1461	John Beaufort; 1404–1444	Richard Neville; 1400–1460	Cecily Neville; 1415–1495	Richard of York; 1411–1460; 3rd Duke of York, Duke of Cornwall
Duke of Cornwall (3rd creation) extinct, 1460
Duke of Bedford (5th creation), 1485	Duke of Clarence (3rd creation), 1461	Duke of Gloucester (3rd creation), 1461
King James II; 1430–1460	Jasper Tudor c. 1431–1495; Duke of Bedford	Edmund Tudor c. 1430–1456	Lady Margaret Beaufort; 1443–1509	John Neville c. 1431–1471	Elizabeth Woodville c. 1437–1492	Edward; 1442–1483; 4th Duke of York, later King Edward IV	George Plantagenet; 1449–1478; Duke of Clarence	Richard of York; 1452–1485; Duke of Gloucester, later King Richard III
Dukedom of Bedford (5th creation) extinct, 1495	Dukedom of York (1st creation) merged in the Crown, 1461	Dukedom of Clarence (3rd creation) forfeit, 1478	Dukedom of Gloucester (3rd creation) merged in the Crown, 1483
Duke of Albany (2nd creation), 1458	Duke of Bedford (3rd creation), 1470	Duke of York (2nd creation), 1474; Duke of Norfolk (3rd creation), 1477	Duke of Bedford (4th creation), 1478
Alexander Stewart c. 1454–1485; 1st Duke of Albany	King James III; 1451/1452–1488	George Neville; 1457–1483; Duke of Bedford	King Henry VII; 1457–1509	Elizabeth of York; 1466–1503	Richard of Shrewsbury; 1473–1483; Duke of York, Duke of Norfolk	George of York; 1477–1479; Duke of Bedford
Dukedom of Bedford (3rd creation) forfeit, 1478	Dukedom of York (2nd creation) and Dukedom of Norfolk (3rd creation) extinct, 1483	Dukedom of Bedford (4th creation) extinct, 1479
Duke of Ross (1st creation), 1488	Duke of York (3rd creation), 1494	Duke of Somerset (3rd creation), 1499
John Stewart; 1482–1536; 2nd Duke of Albany	James Stewart; 1476–1504; Duke of Ross	King James IV; 1473–1513	Margaret Tudor; 1489–1541	Henry; 1491–1547; Duke of York, later King Henry VIII	Edmund Tudor; 1499–1500; Duke of Somerset (nominated but probably not invested)
Dukedom of Albany (2nd creation) extinct, 1536	Dukedom of Ross (1st creation) extinct, 1504	Dukedom of York (3rd creation) merged in the Crown, 1509	Dukedom of Somerset (3rd creation) extinct, 1500
Duke of Ross (2nd creation), 1514
King James V 1512–1542	Alexander Stewart; 1514–1515; Duke of Ross
Duke of Albany (3rd creation), 1565	Dukedom of Ross (2nd creation) extinct, 1515
Henry Stuart; 1546–1567; 1st Duke of Albany	Queen Mary; 1542–1587
James; 1566–1625; 2nd Duke of Albany, later King James VI & I
Dukedom of Albany (3rd creation) merged in the Crown, 1567
Duke of Albany (4th creation), 1604; Duke of York (4th creation), 1605	Duke of Kintyre and Lorne, 1602
Elizabeth Stuart; 1596–1662	Henry Frederick; 1594–1612	Charles; 1600–1649; Duke of Albany, Duke of York, later King Charles I	Robert Stuart; 1602; Duke of Kintyre and Lorne
Dukedom of Albany (4th creation), Dukedom of York (4th creation) merged in the Crown, 1625	Dukedom of Kintyre and Lorne extinct, 1602
Duke of York (5th creation) 1644; Duke of Albany (5th creation), 1660	Duke of Gloucester (4th creation), 1659
Sophia of Hanover; 1630–1714	James Stuart; 1633–1701; Duke of York, Duke of Albany, later King James VII & II	Henry; 1640–1660; Duke of Gloucester
Dukedom of Albany (5th creation) and Dukedom of York (5th creation) merged in the Crown, 1685	Dukedom of Gloucester (4th creation) extinct, 1660
Duke of York and Albany (1st creation), 1716	Duke of Cambridge (1st creation), 1664	Duke of Kendal (1st creation), 1666	Duke of Cambridge (2nd creation), 1667
King George I 1660–1727	Ernest Augustus; 1674–1728; Duke of York and Albany	Charles Stuart; 1660–1661 styled Duke of Cambridge	James Stuart; 1663–1667; Duke of Cambridge	Queen Anne; 1665–1714	Charles Stuart; 1666–1667 designated Duke of Kendal	Edgar Stuart; 1667–1671; Duke of Cambridge	Charles Stuart; 1677 styled Duke of Cambridge
Dukedom of York and Albany (1st creation) extinct, 1728	Dukedom of Cambridge (1st creation) extinct, 1667	Dukedom of Kendal (1st creation), extinct, 1667	Dukedom of Cambridge (2nd creation) extinct, 1671
Duke of Cambridge (3rd creation)
George; 1683–1760; Duke of Cambridge, later King George II	William; 1689–1700 styled Duke of Gloucester
Dukedom of Cambridge (3rd creation) merged with the Crown, 1727
Duke of Edinburgh (1st creation), 1726	Duke of Cumberland (3rd creation), 1726
Frederick; 1707–1751; 1st Duke of Edinburgh, styled Duke of Gloucester until created Duke of Edinburgh	William Augustus; 1721–1765; Duke of Cumberland
Dukedom of Cumberland (3rd creation) extinct, 1765
Duke of York and Albany (2nd creation), 1760	Duke of Gloucester and Edinburgh, 1764	Duke of Cumberland and Strathearn, 1766
George; 1738–1820; 2nd Duke of Edinburgh, later King George III	Edward; 1739–1767; Duke of York and Albany	William Henry; 1743–1805; 1st Duke of Gloucester and Edinburgh	Henry; 1745–1790; Duke of Cumberland and Strathearn
Dukedom of Edinburgh (1st creation), merged in the Crown, 1760	Dukedom of York and Albany (2nd creation) extinct, 1767	Dukedom of Cumberland and Strathearn extinct, 1790
Duke of York and Albany (3rd creation), 1784	Duke of Clarence and St Andrews, 1789	Duke of Kent and Strathearn, 1799	Duke of Cumberland and Teviotdale, 1799	Duke of Sussex (1st creation), 1801	Duke of Cambridge (4th creation), 1801
Frederick; 1763–1827; Duke of York and Albany	William Henry; 1765–1837, Duke of Clarence and St Andrews, later King William IV	Edward; 1767–1820; Duke of Kent and Strathearn	Ernest Augustus; 1771–1851; King of Hanover, 1st Duke of Cumberland and Teviotdale	Augustus Frederick; 1773–1843; Duke of Sussex	Adolphus; 1774–1850; 1st Duke of Cambridge	Mary; 1776–1857	William Frederick; 1776–1834; 2nd Duke of Gloucester and Edinburgh
Dukedom of York and Albany (3rd creation) extinct, 1827	Dukedom of Clarence and St Andrews merged in the Crown, 1830	Dukedom of Kent and Strathearn extinct, 1820	Dukedom of Sussex (1st creation) extinct, 1843	Dukedom of Gloucester and Edinburgh extinct, 1834
Queen Victoria; 1819–1901	George V 1819–1878; King of Hanover, 2nd Duke of Cumberland and Teviotdale	George; 1819–1904; 2nd Duke of Cambridge	Mary Adelaide; 1833–1897
Dukedom of Cambridge (4th creation) extinct, 1904
Duke of Edinburgh (2nd creation), 1866	Duke of Connaught and Strathearn, 1874	Duke of Albany (6th creation), 1881
King Edward VII; 1841–1910	Ernest Augustus; 1845–1923; 3rd Duke of Cumberland and Teviotdale	Alice; 1843–1878	Alfred Ernest Albert; 1844–1900; Duke of Edinburgh	Arthur; 1850–1942; 1st Duke of Connaught and Strathearn	Leopold; 1853–1884; 1st Duke of Albany
Dukedom of Cumberland and Teviotdale forfeit, 1919	Dukedom of Edinburgh (2nd creation) extinct, 1900
Duke of Clarence and Avondale, 1890	Duke of York (6th creation), 1892
Albert Victor; 1864–1892; Duke of Clarence and Avondale	George; 1865–1936; Duke of York, later King George V	Mary of Teck; 1867–1953	Victoria of Hesse and by Rhine; 1863–1950	Arthur of Connaught; 1883–1938
Dukedom of Clarence and Avondale extinct, 1892	Dukedom of York (6th creation) merged in the Crown, 1910
Duke of Windsor, 1937	Duke of York (7th creation), 1920	Duke of Kent (2nd creation), 1934	Duke of Gloucester (5th creation), 1928
King Edward VIII; 1894–1972; Later Duke of Windsor	Albert; 1895–1952; Duke of York, later King George VI	Alice of Battenberg; 1885–1969	George; 1902–1942; 1st Duke of Kent	Henry; 1900–1974; 1st Duke of Gloucester	Alastair Arthur; 1914–1943; 2nd Duke of Connaught and Strathearn	Charles Edward; 1884–1954; 2nd Duke of Albany
Dukedom of Windsor extinct, 1972	Dukedom of York (7th creation) merged in the Crown, 1936	Dukedom of Connaught and Strathearn extinct, 1943	Dukedom of Albany (6th creation) forfeit, 1919
Duke of Edinburgh (3rd creation), 1947
Queen Elizabeth II; 1926–2022	Philip; 1921–2021; 1st Duke of Edinburgh	Edward b. 1935; 2nd Duke of Kent
Duke of York (8th creation), 1986 (revoked 2025)	Duke of Edinburgh (4th creation), 2023
Charles b. 1948; 2nd Duke of Edinburgh, later King Charles III	Andrew b. 1960; Duke of York	Edward b. 1964; Duke of Edinburgh	George Windsor b. 1962	Richard b. 1944; 2nd Duke of Gloucester
Dukedom of Edinburgh (3rd creation) merged in the Crown, 2022	No male heirs	Dukedom of Edinburgh (4th creation) is a life peerage and therefore not hereditary	Heir apparent to the Dukedom of Kent
Duke of Cambridge (5th creation), 2011	Duke of Sussex (2nd creation), 2018
William b. 1982; Duke of Cambridge	Harry b. 1984; Duke of Sussex	Edward Windsor b. 1988	Alexander Windsor b. 1974
Heir-apparent to the Dukedom of Gloucester
George of Wales b. 2013	Archie of Sussex b. 2019
Heir apparent to the Dukedom of Cambridge	Heir apparent to the Dukedom of Sussex

== Possible future creations ==
The Dukedom is currently vacant. While there was some speculation that it was one of the options available for Prince Harry of Wales upon his wedding with Meghan Markle, press reports also noted the Dukedom's chequered past, including scandals and unfounded rumours of criminality related to Prince Albert Victor, Duke of Clarence and Avondale. Prince Harry was ultimately awarded the Dukedom of Sussex.
