= Duke of Cumberland =

Dukedom in the Peerages of England and Great Britain

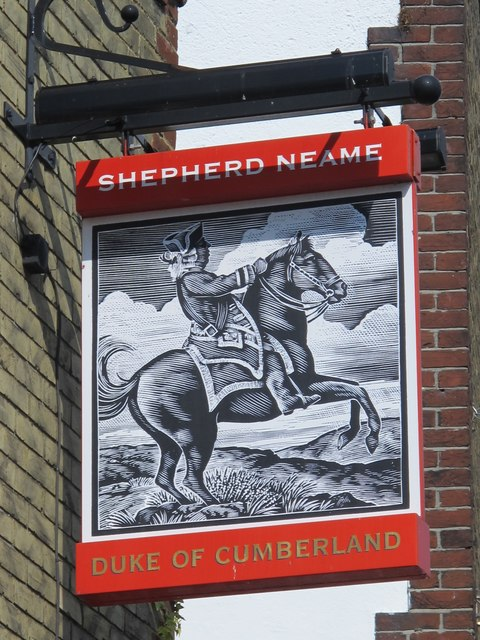
Sign at the Duke of Cumberland hotel, Canterbury. The image is of Prince William, Duke of Cumberland, victor at Culloden.

Duke of Cumberland is a peerage title that was conferred upon junior members of the British royal family, named after the historic county of Cumberland.

== History ==
The Earldom of Cumberland, created in 1525, became extinct in 1643. The dukedom was created in the Peerage of England in 1644 for Prince Rupert of the Rhine, nephew of King Charles I. When he died without male heirs, the title was created again in the Peerage of England in 1689 for Prince George of Denmark, husband of Princess Anne, later Queen Anne, younger daughter of King James II. He also died without heirs, in 1708. Neither of these men, however, was usually known by his peerage title.

The third creation, in the Peerage of Great Britain, was for Prince William, the third son of King George II. Other titles granted to Prince William were Marquess of Berkhampstead, Earl of Kennington, Viscount Trematon and Baron Alderney. Since the Prince died unmarried and without children, his titles became extinct at his death.

The titles Duke of Cumberland and Strathearn and Duke of Cumberland and Teviotdale were later created in the Peerage of Great Britain.

== List of titleholders ==
=== Dukes of Cumberland, first creation (1644) ===
| Duke | Portrait | Birth | Marriage(s) | Death |
|---|---|---|---|---|
| Prince Rupert; House of Wittelsbach; 1644–1682 also: Earl of Holderness (1644) | Prince Rupert | 17 December 1619; Prague son of Frederick V, Elector Palatine and Elizabeth Stuart, Queen of Bohemia | Never married | 29 November 1682; Westminster aged 62 |
Nephew of Charles I, died without legitimate issue.

=== Dukes of Cumberland, second creation (1689) ===
| Duke | Portrait | Birth | Marriage(s) | Death |
|---|---|---|---|---|
| Prince George; House of Oldenburg; 1689–1708 also: Earl of Kendal and Baron Wokingham (1689) | Prince George | 2 June 1653; Copenhagen Castle son of Frederick III of Denmark and Sophie Amalie of Brunswick-Lüneburg | Anne; 28 July 1683; 5 children | 28 October 1708; Kensington Palace aged 55 |
Husband of Queen Anne, died without surviving issue.

=== Dukes of Cumberland, third creation (1726) ===
| Duke | Portrait | Birth | Marriage(s) | Death |
|---|---|---|---|---|
| Prince William also Marquess of Berkhamsted, Earl of Kennington, Viscount Trematon and Baron Alderney (Great Britain, 1726) | Prince William | 26 April 1721; Leicester House, London son of George II of Great Britain and Caroline of Ansbach | Never married | 31 October 1765; London aged 44 |
Also known as "Butcher" Cumberland and Sweet William.

=== Dukes of Cumberland and Strathearn (1766) ===
The sole title-holder was Prince Henry (1745–1790), third son of Frederick, Prince of Wales. He died without legitimate issue, when the dukedom again became extinct.

=== Dukes of Cumberland and Teviotdale (1799) ===
This double dukedom, in the Peerage of Great Britain, was bestowed on Prince Ernest Augustus (1771–1851) (later King of Hanover), the fifth son and eighth child of King George III of the United Kingdom and King of Hanover. In 1919, it was suspended under the Titles Deprivation Act 1917 and, as of 2025, has not been restored to its titular heir.

== Family trees ==
Family tree: Dukes of Cumberland, Cumberland and Strathearn, and Cumberland and Teviotdale

King James VI and I 1566–1625
Princess Elizabeth Stuart; 1596–1662 | King Charles I 1600–1649
Duke of Cumberland (1st creation) and Earl of Holderness (2nd creation), 1644
Prince Rupert; 1619–1682; Duke of Cumberland, etc. | Sophia of Hanover; 1630–1714 | King James II; 1633–1701
Dukedom of Cumberland (1st creation) and subsidiary title extinct, 1682
Duke of Cumberland (2nd creation), Earl of Kendal (4th creation), and Baron Wokingham, 1689
King George I 1660–1727 | Queen Anne; 1665–1714 | Prince George; 1653–1708; Duke of Cumberland, etc.
Dukedom of Cumberland (2nd creation) and subsidiary titles extinct, 1708
King George II; 1683–1760
Duke of Cumberland (3rd creation), Marquess of Berkhamsted, Earl of Kennington, Viscount Trematon (1st creation), and Baron Alderney, 1726
Prince Frederick Louis; 1707–1751; Prince of Wales | Prince William Augustus; 1721–1765; Duke of Cumberland, etc.
Dukedom of Cumberland (3rd creation) and subsidiary titles extinct, 1765
Duke of Cumberland and Strathearn and Earl of Dublin (1st creation), 1766
King George III; 1738–1820 | Prince Henry; 1745–1790; Duke of Cumberland and Strathearn, etc.
Dukedom of Cumberland and Strathearn and subsidiary title extinct, 1790
Duke of Cumberland and Teviotdale and Earl of Armagh, 1799
King George IV; 1762–1830 | Ernest Augustus; 1771–1851; 1st Duke of Cumberland and Teviotdale, etc. later King of Hanover
Georg Friedrich Alexander Karl Ernst August; 1819–1878; 2nd Duke of Cumberland and Teviotdale, etc. later George V, King of Hanover
Prince Ernest Augustus; 1845–1923; 3rd Duke of Cumberland and Teviotdale, etc.
Dukedom of Cumberland and Teviotdale and subsidiary title forfeit, 1919

Family tree of British royal dukes

Includes dukes of: Albany, Albemarle, Bedford, Cambridge, Clarence, Connaught and Strathearn, Cumberland, Edinburgh, Gloucester, Gloucester and Edinburgh, Hereford, Kent, Kintyre and Lorne, Norfolk, Ross, Somerset, Sussex, Windsor, and York, but only when royally.

Non-royal dukes are not included; see Royal dukedoms in the United Kingdom.
Also not included are titles mandated for use by the heir apparent (Duke of Rothesay and the 1337 creation of the Duke of Cornwall), see Princes of Wales family tree.

King Robert II; 1316–1390 | King Edward III; 1312–1377
Duke of Albany (1st creation), 1398 | Duke of Clarence (1st creation), 1362 | Duke of York (1st creation), 1385
King Robert III c. 1337–1406 | Robert Stewart c. 1340–1420; 1st Duke of Albany | Edward the Black Prince; 1330–1376 | Lionel of Antwerp; 1338–1368; Duke of Clarence | John of Gaunt; 1340–1399 | Edmund; 1341–1402; 1st Duke of York
Dukedom of Clarence (1st creation) extinct, 1368
Duke of Cornwall (2nd creation), 1376 | Duke of Hereford, 1397 | Duke of Gloucester (1st creation), 1385
Murdoch Stewart c. 1362–1425; 2nd Duke of Albany | Richard of Bordeaux; 1367–1400; Duke of Cornwall, later King Richard II | Henry Bolingbroke; 1367–1413; Duke of Hereford, later King Henry IV | Thomas of Woodstock; 1355–1397; Duke of Gloucester
Dukedom of Albany (1st creation) forfeit, 1425 | Dukedom of Cornwall (2nd creation) merged in the crown, 1377 | Dukedom of Hereford merged in the crown, 1399 | Dukedom of Gloucester (1st creation) extinct, 1397
Duke of Clarence (2nd creation), 1412 | Duke of Bedford (1st & 2nd creations), 1414 | Duke of Gloucester (2nd creation), 1414 | Duke of Albemarle (Aumale) (1st creation), 1397
Thomas of Lancaster; 1387–1421; Duke of Clarence | John of Lancaster; 1389–1435; Duke of Bedford; Surrendered dukedom and then regranted, 1433 | Humphrey of Lancaster; 1390–1447; Duke of Gloucester | John Beaufort; 1373–1410 | Joan Beaufort c. 1379–1440 | Edward of Norwich c. 1373–1415; Duke of Aumale, 2nd Duke of York | Richard of Conisburgh; 1385–1415
Dukedom of Clarence (2nd creation) extinct, 1421 | Dukedom of Bedford (2nd creation) extinct, 1435 | Dukedom of Gloucester (2nd creation) extinct, 1447 | Dukedom of Albemarle (Aumale) (1st creation) forfeit, 1399
Duke of York (1st creation) restored, 1425; Duke of Cornwall (3rd creation), 1460
King James I 1394–1437 | Joan Beaufort c. 1404–1445 | Owen Tudor c. 1400–1461 | John Beaufort; 1404–1444 | Richard Neville; 1400–1460 | Cecily Neville; 1415–1495 | Richard of York; 1411–1460; 3rd Duke of York, Duke of Cornwall
Duke of Cornwall (3rd creation) extinct, 1460
Duke of Bedford (5th creation), 1485 | Duke of Clarence (3rd creation), 1461 | Duke of Gloucester (3rd creation), 1461
King James II; 1430–1460 | Jasper Tudor c. 1431–1495; Duke of Bedford | Edmund Tudor c. 1430–1456 | Lady Margaret Beaufort; 1443–1509 | John Neville c. 1431–1471 | Elizabeth Woodville c. 1437–1492 | Edward; 1442–1483; 4th Duke of York, later King Edward IV | George Plantagenet; 1449–1478; Duke of Clarence | Richard of York; 1452–1485; Duke of Gloucester, later King Richard III
Dukedom of Bedford (5th creation) extinct, 1495 | Dukedom of York (1st creation) merged in the Crown, 1461 | Dukedom of Clarence (3rd creation) forfeit, 1478 | Dukedom of Gloucester (3rd creation) merged in the Crown, 1483
Duke of Albany (2nd creation), 1458 | Duke of Bedford (3rd creation), 1470 | Duke of York (2nd creation), 1474; Duke of Norfolk (3rd creation), 1477 | Duke of Bedford (4th creation), 1478
Alexander Stewart c. 1454–1485; 1st Duke of Albany | King James III; 1451/1452–1488 | George Neville; 1457–1483; Duke of Bedford | King Henry VII; 1457–1509 | Elizabeth of York; 1466–1503 | Richard of Shrewsbury; 1473–1483; Duke of York, Duke of Norfolk | George of York; 1477–1479; Duke of Bedford
Dukedom of Bedford (3rd creation) forfeit, 1478 | Dukedom of York (2nd creation) and Dukedom of Norfolk (3rd creation) extinct, 1483 | Dukedom of Bedford (4th creation) extinct, 1479
Duke of Ross (1st creation), 1488 | Duke of York (3rd creation), 1494 | Duke of Somerset (3rd creation), 1499
John Stewart; 1482–1536; 2nd Duke of Albany | James Stewart; 1476–1504; Duke of Ross | King James IV; 1473–1513 | Margaret Tudor; 1489–1541 | Henry; 1491–1547; Duke of York, later King Henry VIII | Edmund Tudor; 1499–1500; Duke of Somerset (nominated but probably not invested)
Dukedom of Albany (2nd creation) extinct, 1536 | Dukedom of Ross (1st creation) extinct, 1504 | Dukedom of York (3rd creation) merged in the Crown, 1509 | Dukedom of Somerset (3rd creation) extinct, 1500
Duke of Ross (2nd creation), 1514
King James V 1512–1542 | Alexander Stewart; 1514–1515; Duke of Ross
Duke of Albany (3rd creation), 1565 | Dukedom of Ross (2nd creation) extinct, 1515
Henry Stuart; 1546–1567; 1st Duke of Albany | Queen Mary; 1542–1587
James; 1566–1625; 2nd Duke of Albany, later King James VI & I
Dukedom of Albany (3rd creation) merged in the Crown, 1567
Duke of Albany (4th creation), 1604; Duke of York (4th creation), 1605 | Duke of Kintyre and Lorne, 1602
Elizabeth Stuart; 1596–1662 | Henry Frederick; 1594–1612 | Charles; 1600–1649; Duke of Albany, Duke of York, later King Charles I | Robert Stuart; 1602; Duke of Kintyre and Lorne
Dukedom of Albany (4th creation), Dukedom of York (4th creation) merged in the Crown, 1625 | Dukedom of Kintyre and Lorne extinct, 1602
Duke of York (5th creation) 1644; Duke of Albany (5th creation), 1660 | Duke of Gloucester (4th creation), 1659
Sophia of Hanover; 1630–1714 | James Stuart; 1633–1701; Duke of York, Duke of Albany, later King James VII & II | Henry; 1640–1660; Duke of Gloucester
Dukedom of Albany (5th creation) and Dukedom of York (5th creation) merged in the Crown, 1685 | Dukedom of Gloucester (4th creation) extinct, 1660
Duke of York and Albany (1st creation), 1716 | Duke of Cambridge (1st creation), 1664 | Duke of Kendal (1st creation), 1666 | Duke of Cambridge (2nd creation), 1667
King George I 1660–1727 | Ernest Augustus; 1674–1728; Duke of York and Albany | Charles Stuart; 1660–1661 styled Duke of Cambridge | James Stuart; 1663–1667; Duke of Cambridge | Queen Anne; 1665–1714 | Charles Stuart; 1666–1667 designated Duke of Kendal | Edgar Stuart; 1667–1671; Duke of Cambridge | Charles Stuart; 1677 styled Duke of Cambridge
Dukedom of York and Albany (1st creation) extinct, 1728 | Dukedom of Cambridge (1st creation) extinct, 1667 | Dukedom of Kendal (1st creation), extinct, 1667 | Dukedom of Cambridge (2nd creation) extinct, 1671
Duke of Cambridge (3rd creation)
George; 1683–1760; Duke of Cambridge, later King George II | William; 1689–1700 styled Duke of Gloucester
Dukedom of Cambridge (3rd creation) merged with the Crown, 1727
Duke of Edinburgh (1st creation), 1726 | Duke of Cumberland (3rd creation), 1726
Frederick; 1707–1751; 1st Duke of Edinburgh, styled Duke of Gloucester until created Duke of Edinburgh | William Augustus; 1721–1765; Duke of Cumberland
Dukedom of Cumberland (3rd creation) extinct, 1765
Duke of York and Albany (2nd creation), 1760 | Duke of Gloucester and Edinburgh, 1764 | Duke of Cumberland and Strathearn, 1766
George; 1738–1820; 2nd Duke of Edinburgh, later King George III | Edward; 1739–1767; Duke of York and Albany | William Henry; 1743–1805; 1st Duke of Gloucester and Edinburgh | Henry; 1745–1790; Duke of Cumberland and Strathearn
Dukedom of Edinburgh (1st creation), merged in the Crown, 1760 | Dukedom of York and Albany (2nd creation) extinct, 1767 | Dukedom of Cumberland and Strathearn extinct, 1790
Duke of York and Albany (3rd creation), 1784 | Duke of Clarence and St Andrews, 1789 | Duke of Kent and Strathearn, 1799 | Duke of Cumberland and Teviotdale, 1799 | Duke of Sussex (1st creation), 1801 | Duke of Cambridge (4th creation), 1801
Frederick; 1763–1827; Duke of York and Albany | William Henry; 1765–1837, Duke of Clarence and St Andrews, later King William IV | Edward; 1767–1820; Duke of Kent and Strathearn | Ernest Augustus; 1771–1851; King of Hanover, 1st Duke of Cumberland and Teviotdale | Augustus Frederick; 1773–1843; Duke of Sussex | Adolphus; 1774–1850; 1st Duke of Cambridge | Mary; 1776–1857 | William Frederick; 1776–1834; 2nd Duke of Gloucester and Edinburgh
Dukedom of York and Albany (3rd creation) extinct, 1827 | Dukedom of Clarence and St Andrews merged in the Crown, 1830 | Dukedom of Kent and Strathearn extinct, 1820 | Dukedom of Sussex (1st creation) extinct, 1843 | Dukedom of Gloucester and Edinburgh extinct, 1834
Queen Victoria; 1819–1901 | George V 1819–1878; King of Hanover, 2nd Duke of Cumberland and Teviotdale | George; 1819–1904; 2nd Duke of Cambridge | Mary Adelaide; 1833–1897
Dukedom of Cambridge (4th creation) extinct, 1904
Duke of Edinburgh (2nd creation), 1866 | Duke of Connaught and Strathearn, 1874 | Duke of Albany (6th creation), 1881
King Edward VII; 1841–1910 | Ernest Augustus; 1845–1923; 3rd Duke of Cumberland and Teviotdale | Alice; 1843–1878 | Alfred Ernest Albert; 1844–1900; Duke of Edinburgh | Arthur; 1850–1942; 1st Duke of Connaught and Strathearn | Leopold; 1853–1884; 1st Duke of Albany
Dukedom of Cumberland and Teviotdale forfeit, 1919 | Dukedom of Edinburgh (2nd creation) extinct, 1900
Duke of Clarence and Avondale, 1890 | Duke of York (6th creation), 1892
Albert Victor; 1864–1892; Duke of Clarence and Avondale | George; 1865–1936; Duke of York, later King George V | Mary of Teck; 1867–1953 | Victoria of Hesse and by Rhine; 1863–1950 | Arthur of Connaught; 1883–1938
Dukedom of Clarence and Avondale extinct, 1892 | Dukedom of York (6th creation) merged in the Crown, 1910
Duke of Windsor, 1937 | Duke of York (7th creation), 1920 | Duke of Kent (2nd creation), 1934 | Duke of Gloucester (5th creation), 1928
King Edward VIII; 1894–1972; Later Duke of Windsor | Albert; 1895–1952; Duke of York, later King George VI | Alice of Battenberg; 1885–1969 | George; 1902–1942; 1st Duke of Kent | Henry; 1900–1974; 1st Duke of Gloucester | Alastair Arthur; 1914–1943; 2nd Duke of Connaught and Strathearn | Charles Edward; 1884–1954; 2nd Duke of Albany
Dukedom of Windsor extinct, 1972 | Dukedom of York (7th creation) merged in the Crown, 1936 | Dukedom of Connaught and Strathearn extinct, 1943 | Dukedom of Albany (6th creation) forfeit, 1919
Duke of Edinburgh (3rd creation), 1947
Queen Elizabeth II; 1926–2022 | Philip; 1921–2021; 1st Duke of Edinburgh | Edward b. 1935; 2nd Duke of Kent
Duke of York (8th creation), 1986 (revoked 2025) | Duke of Edinburgh (4th creation), 2023
Charles b. 1948; 2nd Duke of Edinburgh, later King Charles III | Andrew b. 1960; Duke of York | Edward b. 1964; Duke of Edinburgh | George Windsor b. 1962 | Richard b. 1944; 2nd Duke of Gloucester
Dukedom of Edinburgh (3rd creation) merged in the Crown, 2022 | No male heirs | Dukedom of Edinburgh (4th creation) is a life peerage and therefore not hereditary | Heir apparent to the Dukedom of Kent
Duke of Cambridge (5th creation), 2011 | Duke of Sussex (2nd creation), 2018
William b. 1982; Duke of Cambridge | Harry b. 1984; Duke of Sussex | Edward Windsor b. 1988 | Alexander Windsor b. 1974
Heir-apparent to the Dukedom of Gloucester
George of Wales b. 2013 | Archie of Sussex b. 2019
Heir apparent to the Dukedom of Cambridge | Heir apparent to the Dukedom of Sussex

== Duke of Cumberland in fiction ==
Predating the title's first creation by eighty-three years, the Elizabethan play Gorboduc (1561) by Thomas Norton and Thomas Sackville includes as a pivotal character Gwenard, Duke of Cumberland. In the political upheaval resulting from King Gorboduc's division of Britain and his subsequent death, Gwenard allies with Clotyn, Duke of Cornwall and Mandud, Duke of Leagre to suppress a rebellion led by Fergus, Duke of Albany in the latter's campaign for the throne.

== Contract bridge ==
An historic fixed bridge hand is known as the Duke of Cumberland hand. The hand also appeared in Ian Fleming's James Bond thriller, Moonraker.

== See also ==
- Royal dukedoms in the United Kingdom
