= Charles Edwards =

Charles Edwards may refer to:

- Charles Edwards (1933–1989), African American blues harmonica player; known as Good Rockin' Charles
- Charles Edwards (Labour politician) (1867–1954), Labour member of parliament for Bedwellty, 1918–1950
- Charles Edwards (Liberal politician) (1825–1889), member of parliament for Windsor
- Charles Edwards (actor) (born 1969), English actor
- Charles Edwards (English cricketer) (1884–1938), English cricketer
- Charles Edwards (footballer) (1854–1943), Wrexham F.C. and Wales international footballer
- Charles Edwards (journalist) (1906–1983), Canadian journalist and news agency executive
- Charles Edwards (New Zealand cricketer) (1856–1924), New Zealand cricketer
- Charles Edwards (Rastafari) (1915–1994), influential leader of the Rastafari movement and head of the Bobo Shanti mansion
- Charles Edwards (stage designer) (born 1965), English opera designer and director
- Charles Edwards (writer) (1628?–1691?), Welsh writer and preacher
- Charlie Edwards (boxer) (born 1993), British boxer
- Charlie Edwards (Australian footballer) (born 2005), Australian rules footballer
- Charles C. Edwards (1923–2011), American physician
- Charles G. Edwards (1878–1931), American politician from the state of Georgia
- Charles W. Edwards (1934–2015), American politician, member of the Georgia House of Representatives
- Charles Lincoln Edwards (1863–1937), American zoologist
- Charles Marcus Edwards, confessed Klansman
- Charles Uzzell-Edwards (born 1968), Welsh graffiti artist
- Charlie Edwards (character), fictional character in British series, Hotel Babylon
- Bud Edwards (Charles Halleck Edwards, 1908–1986), American football player
- Charles Martin Edwards (born 1945), chairman of Manchester United
- Chuck Edwards (Charles Marion Edwards, born 1960), American politician from North Carolina
