= Viscount Trematon =

Title in the United Kingdom

The title Viscount Trematon has been created twice, once in the Peerage of Great Britain, and once in the Peerage of the United Kingdom.

- in 1726 as a subsidiary title of the Duke of Cumberland
- in 1917 as a subsidiary title of the Earl of Athlone
