= Duchies in England =

Currently, there are two duchies in England; the royal Duchy of Lancaster and the royal Duchy of Cornwall. Unlike historic duchies in England, these are no longer coextensive with a distinct geographic area, although they originated in the counties palatine of Lancaster and Cornwall. Rather, they are "Crown bodies", regulated by Acts of Parliament, that have some of the powers of a corporation or trust. The administration of the duchies is regulated by the Duchies of Lancaster and Cornwall (Accounts) Act 1838. The duchies invest primarily in land, and their income is payable either to the monarch or the monarch's eldest heir.

== Duchy of Lancaster ==
The Duchy of Lancaster owns approximately 46,500 acres (188 km^{2}) including Lancaster Castle and is administered by a Chancellor. The Chancellor of the Duchy of Lancaster is normally a member of the British Cabinet. The income of the Duchy of Lancaster accrues to the Duke of Lancaster, a title which has been held by the reigning monarch since 1413, whether male or female; King Charles III is the current Duke of Lancaster.

== Duchy of Cornwall ==
The landholdings of the Duchy of Cornwall, which extend over much of southern England and parts of Wales

The principal activity of the Duchy of Cornwall is the management of its land totalling 135,000 acres or 550 km^{2} in England. This includes just over 2% of the county of Cornwall. The majority of the estate lies elsewhere, with half being on Dartmoor in Devon, with other large holdings in Cornwall, Herefordshire, Somerset and almost all of the Isles of Scilly. Another large portion of its holdings are strips of foreshore and riverbed along the Cornish and Devon coasts. The duchy also has a financial investments portfolio. The income of the Duchy of Cornwall accrues to the Duke of Cornwall, who is the monarch's eldest child if heir to the throne (and thus generally the Prince of Wales). The eldest son of the reigning British monarch inherits possession of the duchy and title of Duke of Cornwall at birth or when his parent succeeds to the throne, but may not sell assets for personal benefit and has limited rights and income as a minor. If the monarch has no male children, the rights and responsibilities of the duchy belong to the Crown, and there is no duke. The current duke is William, Prince of Wales. For the fiscal year ending 31 March 2020, the duchy was valued at £909 million, and annual profit was £22.3 million, a revenue surplus gain of 2.9% from the previous year. The estate reported a reduction in carbon emissions of 56% since 2007 with an aim to be net zero by 2028.

== See also ==
- Dukes in the United Kingdom
- Royal dukedoms in the United Kingdom
- List of dukes in the peerages of Britain and Ireland
- Crown Estate
