= Charles Edwards (English cricketer) =

English cricketer

Personal information
- Full name: Charles William edwards
- Born: 18 October 1884; Port Elizabeth, Cape Colony
- Died: 22 May 1938 (aged 53); Earl's Court, London
- Batting: Right-handed

Domestic team information
- Years: Team
- 1911–1912: Gloucestershire
- Source: Cricinfo, 29 March 2014

Colonel Charles William Edwards MC DSO (18 October 1884 – 22 May 1938) was an English soldier who played first-class cricket for Gloucestershire County Cricket Club in 1911 and 1912.

Edwards was born at Port Elizabeth in South Africa in 1994, the son of William Mandeville Edwards. The family later lived at Stoke Bishop in Bristol and Edwards was educated at Cheltenham College where he played in the cricket XI in 1901 and 1902.

After leaving school in 1902, Edwards was admitted to Royal Military College Sandhurst and was commissioned as a second lieutenant in the Royal Army Service Corps the following year. He served in the British Army during World War I, finishing the war with the rank of acting major, and was awarded the Military Cross in 1917 and the Distinguished Service Order in 1919. By 1937 he was serving as the assistant director of Military Transport at the Royal Arsenal, Woolwich.

As well as playing Army cricket, Edwards played seven first-class cricket matches for Gloucestershire, making five appearances in 1912 and two the following season. He scored a total of 184 runs with a highest score of 42 made against Kent at Gravesend in his second match for the county.

Edwards died in 1938 at Earl's Court in London. He was aged 54.
