= Edward Charles =

Edward Charles may refer to:

- Edward Charles (author) (1898–1961), English author, educator and sexologist
- Edward Charles (RAF officer) (1919–1986), Canadian flying ace of the Second World War
- Edward Tamba Charles (born 1956), Sierra Leonean Catholic prelate
- Ned Charles (born 1957), Mauritian footballer

== See also ==
- Ed Charles (1933–2018), American baseball player
