= Charles Edward =

Charles Edward may refer to:

- Charles Edward (horse), a racehorse
- Charles Edward Stuart, aka Bonnie Prince Charlie
- Charles Edward Stuart, American politician
- Charles Edward, Duke of Saxe-Coburg and Gotha
- Charles Edward Callwell, British soldier
- Charles Edward Flower, British brewer responsible for the creation of the Shakespeare Memorial Theatre
- Charles Edward Jennings, Irish soldier
- Charles Edward Magoon, American lawyer
- Charles Edward Merriam, American professor
- Charles Edward Russell, American journalist

== See also ==
- Charles Edwards (disambiguation)
- Edward Charles (disambiguation)
