= Duke of Cumberland and Teviotdale =

Dukedom in the Peerage of Great Britain

Dukedom of Cumberland and Teviotdale
- Creation date: 24 April 1799
- Created by: King George III
- Peerage: Peerage of Great Britain
- First holder: Prince Ernest Augustus
- Last holder: Ernest Augustus, Crown Prince of Hanover
- Remainder to: the 1st Duke's heirs male of the body lawfully begotten
- Subsidiary titles: Earl of Armagh
- Status: Suspended on 28 March 1919 under the Titles Deprivation Act 1917

Duke of Cumberland and Teviotdale was a title in the Peerage of Great Britain that was held by junior members of the British royal family. It was named after the county of Cumberland in England, and after Teviotdale in Scotland. Held by the Hanoverian royals, it was suspended under the Titles Deprivation Act 1917, which revoked titles belonging to enemies of the United Kingdom during the Great War.

== History ==
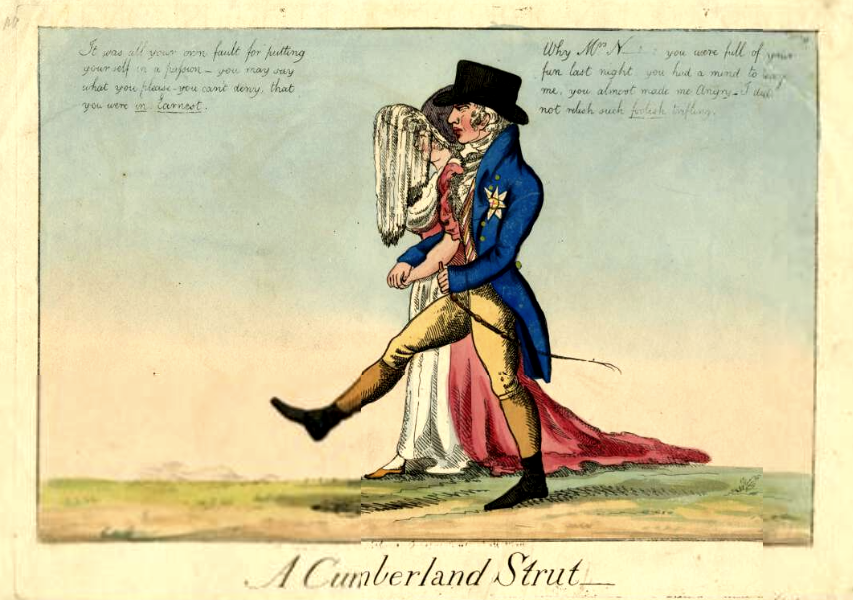
"A Cumberland Strut": 1812 sketch depicting Ernest Augustus's title and Charlotte Nugent (wife of Charles Edmund Nugent), his supposed mistress

The title Duke of Cumberland had been created three times in the Peerages of England and Great Britain.

In 1799, the double dukedom of Cumberland and Teviotdale, in the Peerage of Great Britain, was bestowed on Ernest Augustus (later King of Hanover), fifth son of King George III of the United Kingdom. Cumberland is a historic county in northwest England, while Teviotdale refers to the basin of the River Teviot in Scotland. In 1837, Ernest became king of Hanover, and on his death in 1851 the title descended with the kingdom to his son King George V of Hanover, and on George's death in 1878 to his grandson Prince Ernest Augustus, Crown Prince of Hanover. In 1866, Hanover was annexed by Prussia, but King George died without renouncing his rights. His son Ernest, while maintaining his claim to the kingdom of Hanover, was generally known by his title of Duke of Cumberland in Britain.

The title was suspended for Ernest's pro-German activities during World War I under the Titles Deprivation Act 1917, as it was for his son. Under the Act, the lineal male heirs of the 3rd Duke of Cumberland and Teviotdale have the right to petition the British Crown for the restoration of his peerages. To date, none has done so. The present heir is Prince Ernst August of Hanover (born 26 February 1954), great-grandson of the 3rd Duke and current head of the House of Hanover. He is the senior male-line descendant of George III of the United Kingdom.

== Dukes of Cumberland and Teviotdale ==
After the Union of Great Britain, the Hanoverian kings liked to grant double titles (one from one constituent country, one from another) to emphasise unity.

Duke	Portrait	Birth	Marriage(s)	Death	Succession	Arms
Prince Ernest Augustus; House of Hanover; 1799–1851 also Earl of Armagh (1799), King of Hanover (1837)	Ernest Augustus, King of Hanover	5 June 1771; Buckingham Palace son of George III and Charlotte of Mecklenburg-Strelitz	Duchess Frederica of Mecklenburg-Strelitz; 29 May 1815; 3 children	18 November 1851; Hanover aged 80	The son of George III	
Prince George; House of Hanover; 1851–1878 also Earl of Armagh (1851), King of Hanover (1851)	George V, King of Hanover	27 May 1819; Berlin son of Prince Ernest Augustus and Frederica of Mecklenburg-Strelitz	Princess Marie of Saxe-Altenburg; 18 February 1843; 3 children	12 June 1878; Paris aged 59	The son of Prince Ernest Augustus, the 1st Duke	
Prince Ernest Augustus; House of Hanover; 1878–1919 also Earl of Armagh (1878), Crown Prince of Hanover (1851)	Ernest Augustus, Crown Prince of Hanover	21 September 1845; Hanover son of Prince George and Marie of Saxe-Altenburg	Princess Thyra of Denmark; 21 December 1878; 6 children	14 November 1923; Gmunden aged 78	The son of Prince George, the 2nd Duke	
The Titles Deprivation Act 1917 suspended the title on 28 March 1919.

Family tree: Dukes of Cumberland, Cumberland and Strathearn, and Cumberland and Teviotdale

King James VI and I 1566–1625
Princess Elizabeth Stuart; 1596–1662	King Charles I 1600–1649
Duke of Cumberland (1st creation) and Earl of Holderness (2nd creation), 1644
Prince Rupert; 1619–1682; Duke of Cumberland, etc.	Sophia of Hanover; 1630–1714	King James II; 1633–1701
Dukedom of Cumberland (1st creation) and subsidiary title extinct, 1682
Duke of Cumberland (2nd creation), Earl of Kendal (4th creation), and Baron Wokingham, 1689
King George I 1660–1727	Queen Anne; 1665–1714	Prince George; 1653–1708; Duke of Cumberland, etc.
Dukedom of Cumberland (2nd creation) and subsidiary titles extinct, 1708
King George II; 1683–1760
Duke of Cumberland (3rd creation), Marquess of Berkhamsted, Earl of Kennington, Viscount Trematon (1st creation), and Baron Alderney, 1726
Prince Frederick Louis; 1707–1751; Prince of Wales	Prince William Augustus; 1721–1765; Duke of Cumberland, etc.
Dukedom of Cumberland (3rd creation) and subsidiary titles extinct, 1765
Duke of Cumberland and Strathearn and Earl of Dublin (1st creation), 1766
King George III; 1738–1820	Prince Henry; 1745–1790; Duke of Cumberland and Strathearn, etc.
Dukedom of Cumberland and Strathearn and subsidiary title extinct, 1790
Duke of Cumberland and Teviotdale and Earl of Armagh, 1799
King George IV; 1762–1830	Ernest Augustus; 1771–1851; 1st Duke of Cumberland and Teviotdale, etc. later King of Hanover
Georg Friedrich Alexander Karl Ernst August; 1819–1878; 2nd Duke of Cumberland and Teviotdale, etc. later George V, King of Hanover
Prince Ernest Augustus; 1845–1923; 3rd Duke of Cumberland and Teviotdale, etc.
Dukedom of Cumberland and Teviotdale and subsidiary title forfeit, 1919

== See also ==
- King of Hanover
