= Duke of Cumberland and Strathearn =

Dukedom in the Peerage of Great Britain

Dukedom of Cumberland and Strathearn
- Creation date: 22 October 1766
- Created by: King George III
- Peerage: Peerage of Great Britain
- First holder: Prince Henry
- Last holder: Prince Henry
- Remainder to: the 1st Duke's heirs male of the body lawfully begotten
- Subsidiary titles: Earl of Dublin
- Status: Extinct
- Extinction date: 18 September 1790

Duke of Cumberland and Strathearn was a title in the Peerage of Great Britain that was conferred upon a member of the British royal family. It was named after the county of Cumberland in England, and after Strathearn in Scotland.

== History ==
The title of Duke of Cumberland had been created thrice in the Peerages of England and Great Britain.

The title of Duke of Cumberland and Strathearn was created on 22 October 1766 in the Peerage of Great Britain. This double dukedom and the Earldom of Dublin in the Peerage of Ireland were bestowed on Prince Henry, the third son of Frederick, Prince of Wales, and grandson of King George II. Since Prince Henry died without legitimate children, the title became extinct.

The title of Duke of Cumberland and Teviotdale was later created in the Peerage of Great Britain.

Cumberland is a historic county of England, while the title Strathearn referred to the strath (valley) of the River Earn in Scotland; the ancient title Earl/Mormaer of Strathearn died out in the 15th century.

== List of titleholders ==
=== Duke of Cumberland and Strathearn (1766) ===
Duke	Portrait	Birth	Marriage(s)	Death
Prince Henry, Duke of Cumberland and Strathearn also Earl of Dublin (Ireland, 1766)	Prince Henry	7 November 1745; Leicester House, London son of Frederick, Prince of Wales, and Princess Augusta of Saxe-Gotha	Anne Horton	18 September 1790; London aged 44
Henry had no children and all his titles became extinct on his death.
