= Duke of Clarence and St Andrews =

Dukedom in the Peerage of Great Britain

Dukedom of Clarence and St Andrews
- Arms of William Henry, Duke of Clarence and St Andrews, used from 1801–30
- Creation date: 20 May 1789
- Created by: George III
- Peerage: Peerage of Great Britain
- First holder: Prince William Henry
- Last holder: William IV
- Remainder to: Heirs Male of His Royal Highness's Body lawfully begotten
- Subsidiary titles: Earl of Munster
- Status: Extinct – Merged with the Crown on succeeding as King William IV
- Extinction date: 26 June 1830

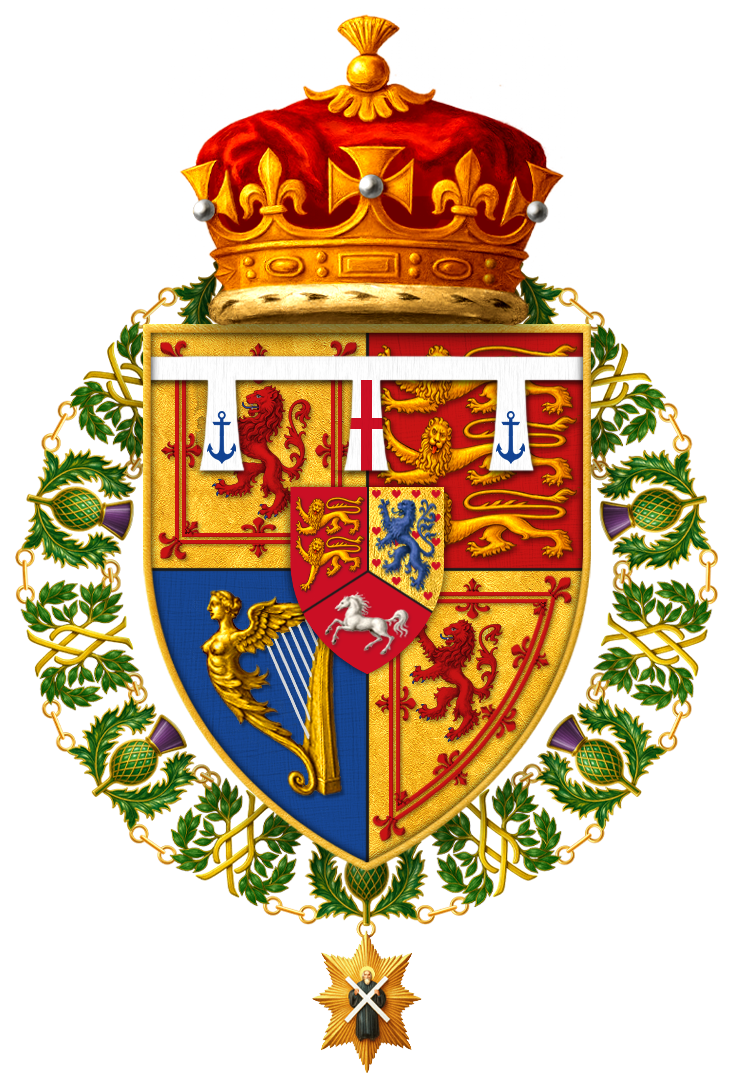
Arms of the Duke of Clarence and St Andrews as used in Scotland, with collar of the Order of the Thistle

Duke of Clarence and St Andrews was a title created in 1789 in the Peerage of Great Britain for Prince William Henry (later King William IV). He was also created Earl of Munster in the Peerage of Ireland at the same time.

While there had been several creations of Dukes of Clarence (and there was later a Duke of Clarence and Avondale), the only creation of a Duke of Clarence and St Andrews was for Prince William, third son of King George III. When William succeeded his elder brother George IV to the throne in 1830, the dukedom merged in the crown. The title refers to ancient castle and honour of Clare, Suffolk; and the Scottish city of St Andrews.

== Duke of Clarence and St Andrews (1789) ==
See also Earl of Munster (1789)

Duke	Portrait	Birth	Marriage(s)	Death
Prince William Henry; House of Hanover; 1789–1830	William IV	21 August 1765; Buckingham House, London son of King George III and Charlotte of Mecklenburg-Strelitz	Adelaide of Saxe-Meiningen; 11 July 1818	20 June 1837; Windsor Castle, Windsor aged 71
Prince William Henry ascended as William IV in 1830 upon his brother's death; and his hereditary titles merged in the Crown. As William had no male issue, the title would have gone extinct in any case, even if he had not become king.

== Family tree ==
Family Tree of the Dukes of Clarence, Clarence and Avondale, and Clarence and St Andrews

Edward III; 1312–1377; King of England
Duke of Clarence (1st creation), 1362
Lionel of Antwerp; 1338–1368; Duke of Clarence	Edmund of Langley; 1341–1402	John of Gaunt; 1340–1399; Duke of Lancaster
Dukedom (1st creation) extinct, 1368
Philippa; 1355–1382; Countess of Ulster	Henry IV; 1367–1413; King of England
Duke of Clarence (2nd creation), 1412
Roger Mortimer; 1374–1398; Earl of March	Thomas of Lancaster; 1388–1421; Duke of Clarence
Dukedom (2nd creation) extinct, 1421
Anne de Mortimer; 1390–1411	Richard of Conisburgh; 1385–1415
Richard of York; 1411–1460; Duke of York
Duke of Clarence (3rd creation), 1461
Edward IV; 1442–1483; King of England	George Plantagenet; 1449–1478; Duke of Clarence
Dukedom (3rd creation) extinct, 1478
Elizabeth of York; 1466–1503	Henry VII; 1457–1509; King of England
Princess Margaret Tudor; 1489–1541	James IV; King of Scotland
James V 1512–1542; King of Scotland
Mary; 1542–1587; Queen of Scotland
James VI & I 1566–1625; King of Scotland and England
Frederick V of the Palatinate	Princess Elizabeth Stuart; 1596–1662
Sophia of Hanover; 1630–1714	Ernest Augustus of Brunswick
George I 1660–1727; King of Great Britain
George II; 1683–1760; King of Great Britain
Prince Frederick Louis; 1707–1751; Prince of Wales
George III; 1738–1820; King of the United Kingdom
Duke of Clarence and St Andrews, 1789
Prince William Henry; 1765–1837; Duke of Clarence and St Andrews later King of the United Kingdom	Prince Edward; 1767–1820; Duke of Kent and Strathearn
Dukedom merged into the Crown, 1830
Victoria; 1819–1901; Queen of the United Kingdom
Earl of Clarence, 1881
Edward VII; 1841–1910; King of the United Kingdom	Prince Leopold; 1853–1884; Duke of Albany; 1st Earl of Clarence
Duke of Clarence and Avondale, 1890
Prince Albert Victor; 1864–1892; Duke of Clarence and Avondale	Charles Edward; 1884–1954; Duke of Saxe-Coburg and Gotha; Duke of Albany; 2nd Earl of Clarence
Dukedom extinct, 1892	Honours forfeit, 1919
