= Alexander Stewart, Duke of Ross =

Alexander Stewart
- Duke of Ross
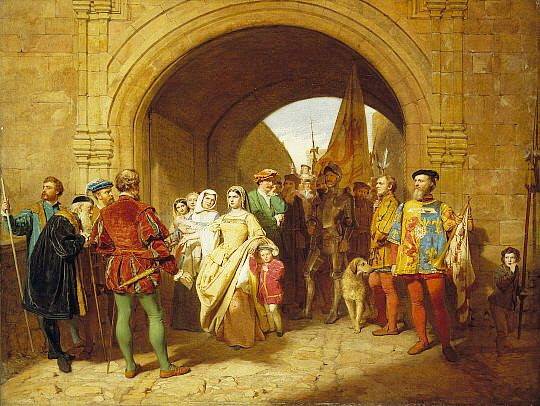
- Alexander's mother Margaret refusing to hand over her sons to John Stewart, Duke of Albany, by John Faed, 1859.
- Born: 30 April 1514; Stirling Castle, Stirlingshire, Scotland
- Died: 18 December 1515 (aged 1); Stirling Castle, Stirlingshire, Scotland
- Father: James IV of Scotland
- Mother: Margaret Tudor

Alexander Stewart, Duke of Ross (30 April 1514 – 18 December 1515), was the fourth and youngest son of King James IV of Scotland and his queen Margaret Tudor.

He was born after his father was killed at the Battle of Flodden, during the reign of his infant brother King James V of Scotland. His nurse was Katherine Fyn. Christine Cockburn was one of his rockers, appointed to rock his cradle. On 4 August 1515, Margaret was forced to surrender her sons to the Regent John Stewart, Duke of Albany. They remained at Stirling Castle under the care of John Erskine, 5th Lord Erskine, John Fleming, 2nd Lord Fleming, William Borthwick, 4th Lord Borthwick and William Keith, 2nd Earl Marischal.

Alexander died in infancy, but during his short life he was heir presumptive to the throne of the Kingdom of Scotland. English officials and diplomats sought to implicate the Duke of Albany in his death as part of their strategy for having him removed from the regency.

== Ancestry ==
Ancestors of Alexander Stewart, Duke of Ross

8. James II of Scotland
4. James III of Scotland
9. Mary of Guelders
2. James IV of Scotland
10. Christian I of Denmark
5. Margaret of Denmark
11. Dorothea of Brandenburg
1. Alexander Stewart, Duke of Ross
12. Edmund Tudor, 1st Earl of Richmond
6. Henry VII of England
13. Margaret Beaufort
3. Margaret Tudor
14. Edward IV of England
7. Elizabeth of York
15. Elizabeth Woodville
