= Baron of Renfrew (title) =

Title of the heir apparent to the British throne

Barony of Renfrew
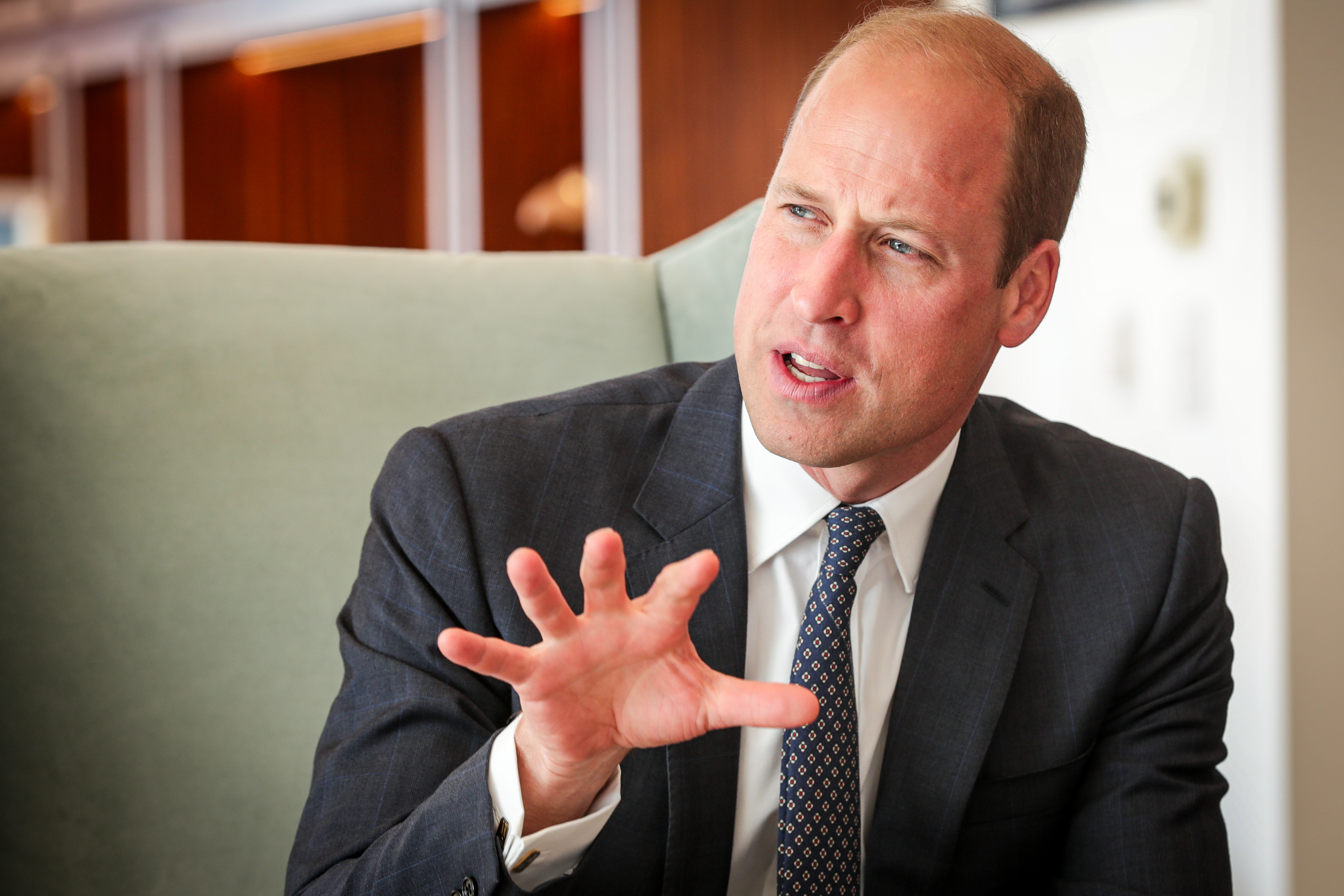
- Prince William, the current Baron of Renfrew
- Creation date: 1398
- Created by: Robert III
- Peerage: Baronage of Scotland
- First holder: David Stewart
- Present holder: Prince William, Duke of Rothesay
- Heir apparent: Prince George

Baron of Renfrew (Scottish Gaelic: Baran Rinn Friù) is a dignity in the Baronage of Scotland held by the heir apparent to the British throne, currently Prince William, Duke of Rothesay. It has been held by the Scottish heir apparent since 1404. It is closely associated with the title Duke of Rothesay. An act of the Scottish Parliament passed in 1469 confirmed the pattern of succession. Renfrew, a town near Glasgow, is sometimes called the "cradle of the royal Stewarts".

In Scotland, barons hold titles in the Baronage of Scotland, not peerages: a Scottish Lord of Parliament equates to an English or British baron. Some, however, claim that the Act of 1469 effectively elevated the Barony of Renfrew to the dignity of a peerage. Others suggest that the barony became a peerage upon the Union of the Crowns in 1603. Finally, some scholars argue that the uncertainty surrounding the text of the 1469 Act leaves the barony as only a baronage dignity, not a peerage dignity. The official position is given in Hansard (House of Lords – written answers) for 18 May 1999: "The Barony of Renfrew is not a peerage dignity at all; it is a feudal or minor barony of Scotland." Note that since the abolition of feudalism in 2004 these feudal titles became personal baronage titles.

The title of Lord Renfrew was used by the traveling Prince of Wales, later King Edward VII, and by Prince Edward, Duke of Rothesay, later King Edward VIII and then Duke of Windsor, when he traveled in a private capacity or when he wished to pay visits 'incognito'.

In the early stages of her relationship with the then Prince of Wales Charles, Diana Spencer gave "Charles Renfrew" to her friends as the name of the man she was dating.

Heir apparent	Parent	From	To	Titles held in addition to Duke of Rothesay
David Stewart	Robert III	1398 (created)	1402 (death)	Earl of Atholl (1398), Baron Renfrew (?), Prince and Great Steward of Scotland (trad.)
James Stewart	Robert III	1404 (created)	1406 (acceded as James I)	Earl of Carrick (1404), Baron/Lord Renfrew, Prince and Great Steward of Scotland (1404)
Alexander Stewart	James I	1430 (birth?)	1430 (death)	
James Stewart	James I	1431 (created)	1437 (acceded as James II)	
James Stewart	James II	1452 (birth?)	1460 (acceded as James III)	
James Stewart	James III	1473 (birth)	1488 (acceded as James IV)	Earl of Carrick and Baron/Lord Renfrew, Prince and Great Steward of Scotland (1469)
James Stewart	James IV	1507 (birth)	1508 (death)	Earl of Carrick and Baron/Lord Renfrew, Prince and Great Steward of Scotland (1469)
Arthur Stewart	James IV	1509 (birth)	1510 (death)	Duke of Albany (1509), Earl of Carrick and Baron/Lord Renfrew, Prince and Great Steward of Scotland (1469)
James Stewart	James IV	1512 (birth)	1513 (acceded as James V)	Earl of Carrick and Baron/Lord Renfrew, Prince and Great Steward of Scotland (1469)
James Stewart	James V	1540 (birth)	1541 (death)	Earl of Carrick and Baron/Lord Renfrew (1469), Lord of the Isles (1540), Prince and Great Steward of Scotland (1469)
James Stuart	Mary I	1566 (birth)	1567 (acceded as James VI)	Earl of Carrick and Baron/Lord Renfrew (1469), Lord of the Isles (1540), Prince and Great Steward of Scotland (1469), Duke of Albany, Earl of Ross, and Lord of Ardmanoch (1566)
Henry Frederick	James VI	1594 (birth)	1612 (death)	Prince of Wales and Earl of Chester (1610), Duke of Cornwall (1337), Earl of Carrick and Baron Renfrew (1469), Lord of the Isles (1540), Prince and Great Steward of Scotland (1469) (The italicised henceforth "Earl of Carrick, etc. 1469 & 1540)"
Prince Charles, Duke of York and of Albany	James VI	1612 (death of brother Henry)	1625 (acceded as Charles I)	Prince of Wales and Earl of Chester (1616), Duke of Cornwall (1337), Duke of Albany (1600), Duke of York (1605), Marquess of Ormond (1600), Earl of Carrick, etc. (1469 & 1540), Earl of Ross, Lord Ardmannoch (1600)
Prince Charles James	Charles I	1629 (birth)	1629 (death)	Duke of Cornwall (1337), Earl of Carrick, etc. (1469 & 1540)
Prince Charles	Charles I	1630 (birth)	1649 (acceded as Charles II)	Prince of Wales and Earl of Chester (1638), Duke of Cornwall (1337), Earl of Carrick, etc. (1469 & 1540)
Prince James Francis Edward	James VII	1688 (birth)	1702 (attainted)	Prince of Wales and Earl of Chester (1688–1702), Duke of Cornwall (1337–1702), Earl of Carrick, etc. (1469 & 1540)
The Prince George, Duke of Cambridge	George I	1714 (father's accession)	1727 (acceded as George II)	Prince of Wales and Earl of Chester (1714), Hereditary Prince of Hanover, Duke of Cornwall (1337), Duke of Cambridge, Marquess of Cambridge (1706), Earl of Carrick, etc. (1469 & 1540), Earl of Milford Haven, Viscount Northallerton, Baron Tewkesbury (1706)
The Prince Frederick, Duke of Edinburgh	George II	1727 (father's accession)	1751 (death)	Prince of Wales and Earl of Chester (1729), Duke of Cornwall (1337), Duke of Edinburgh, Marquess of Ely (1726), Earl of Carrick, etc. (1469 & 1540), Earl of Eltham, Viscount Launceston, Baron Snowdon (1726)
The Prince George	George III	1762 (birth)	1820 (acceded as George IV)	Prince of Wales and Earl of Chester (1762), Duke of Cornwall (1337), Earl of Carrick, etc. (1469 & 1540)
The Prince Albert Edward	Victoria	1841 (birth)	1901 (acceded as Edward VII)	Prince of Wales and Earl of Chester (1841), Duke of Cornwall (1337), Earl of Carrick, etc. (1469 & 1540), Earl of Dublin (1850)
The Prince George, Duke of York	Edward VII	1901 (father's accession)	1910 (acceded as George V)	Prince of Wales and Earl of Chester (1901), Duke of Cornwall (1337), Duke of York (1892), Earl of Carrick, etc. (1469 & 1540), Earl of Inverness, Baron Killarney (1892)
The Prince Edward	George V	1910 (father's accession)	1936 (acceded as Edward VIII)	Prince of Wales and Earl of Chester (1910), Duke of Cornwall (1337), Earl of Carrick, etc. (1469 & 1540)
The Prince Charles	Elizabeth II	1952 (mother's accession)	2022 (acceded as Charles III)	Prince of Wales and Earl of Chester (1958), Duke of Cornwall (1337), Earl of Carrick, etc. (1469 & 1540), Duke of Edinburgh (1947)
The Prince William	Charles III	2022 (father's accession)	Current	Prince of Wales and Earl of Chester (2022), Duke of Cornwall (1337), Earl of Carrick, etc. (1469 & 1540), Duke of Cambridge, Earl of Strathearn, and Baron Carrickfergus (2011)

== See also ==
- Colin Renfrew, Baron Renfrew of Kaimsthorn, known as "Lord Renfrew", a life peer whose title derives from his surname not from the barony of Renfrew
