= Duke of Rothesay =

Dynastic title of heir apparent to British throne

Dukedom of Rothesay
- Arms of Prince William, Duke of Rothesay
- Creation date: 1398
- Created by: King Robert III
- Peerage: Peerage of Scotland
- First holder: David, Duke of Rothesay
- Present holder: William, Prince of Wales
- Subsidiary titles: Earl of Carrick; Baron of Renfrew; Lord of the Isles; Prince and Great Steward of Scotland
- Status: Extant

Duke of Rothesay (/ˈrɒθsi/; Scottish Gaelic: Diùc Baile Bhòid; Scots: Duik o Rothesay) is the main dynastic title traditionally given to the male heir apparent to the Scottish and, later, British thrones. The dukedom was created in 1398 by King Robert III of Scotland for his eldest son.

Duke of Rothesay is the title mandated for use by the heir apparent when in Scotland, in preference to the titles Prince of Wales and Duke of Cornwall, which are used in the rest of the United Kingdom and overseas. The title is named after Rothesay on the Isle of Bute, but is not associated with any legal entity or landed property. The Duke of Rothesay also holds other Scottish titles, including Earl of Carrick, Baron of Renfrew, Lord of the Isles, and Prince and Great Steward of Scotland.

The current holder of the title is William, Prince of Wales, and his wife, Catherine, is the current Duchess of Rothesay.

== History ==
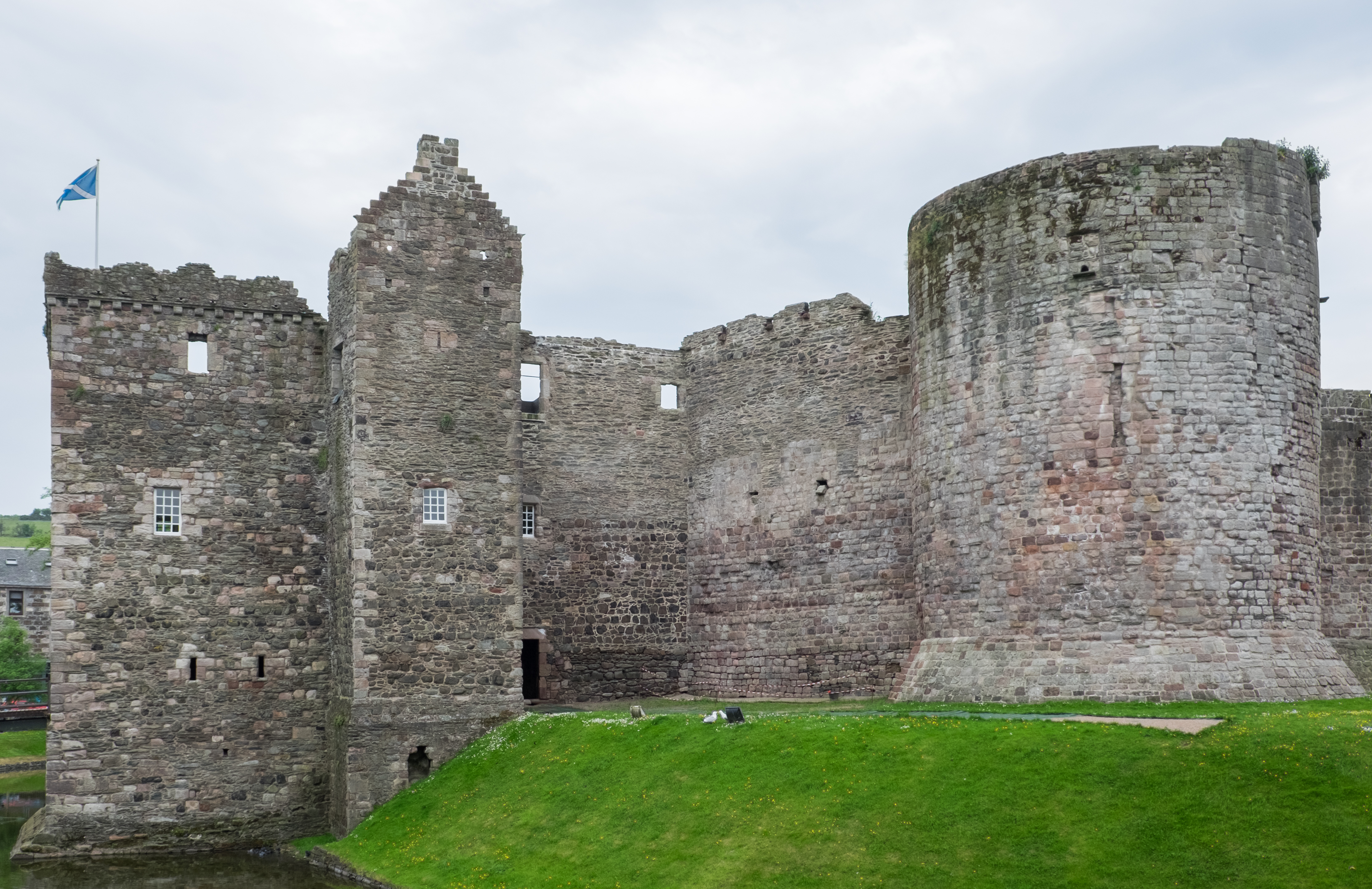
The title derives from Rothesay Castle, Bute.

David Stewart, Duke of Rothesay, the son of Robert III of Scotland, first held the dukedom from its creation in 1398. After his death, his brother James, later King James I, received the dukedom. Thereafter, the heir apparent to the Scottish Crown held the dukedom; an Act of the Parliament of Scotland passed in 1469 confirmed this pattern of succession.

The Earldom of Carrick existed as early as the 12th century. In 1306, Robert the Bruce, Earl of Carrick, became King Robert I of Scotland, with the earldom merging in the Crown. In the following years, successive Kings of Scotland created several heirs apparent Earl of Carrick. The Act of 1469 finally settled the earldom on the eldest son of the Scottish monarch.

The office of the Great Steward of Scotland (also called High Steward or Lord High Steward) dates back to its first holder, Walter fitz Alan, in the 12th century. The seventh Great Steward, Robert, ascended the Scottish throne as Robert II in 1371. Thereafter, only the heirs apparent to the Crown held the office. The 1469 Act also deals with this.

Between the 1603 union of the crowns and Edward VII's time as heir apparent, the style "Duke of Rothesay" appears to have dropped out of usage in favour of "Prince of Wales". Queen Victoria mandated the title for use to refer to the eldest son and heir apparent when in Scotland, and this usage has continued since. This may have been as a result, direct or indirect, of the 1822 visit of King George IV to Scotland.

== Lord of the Isles ==
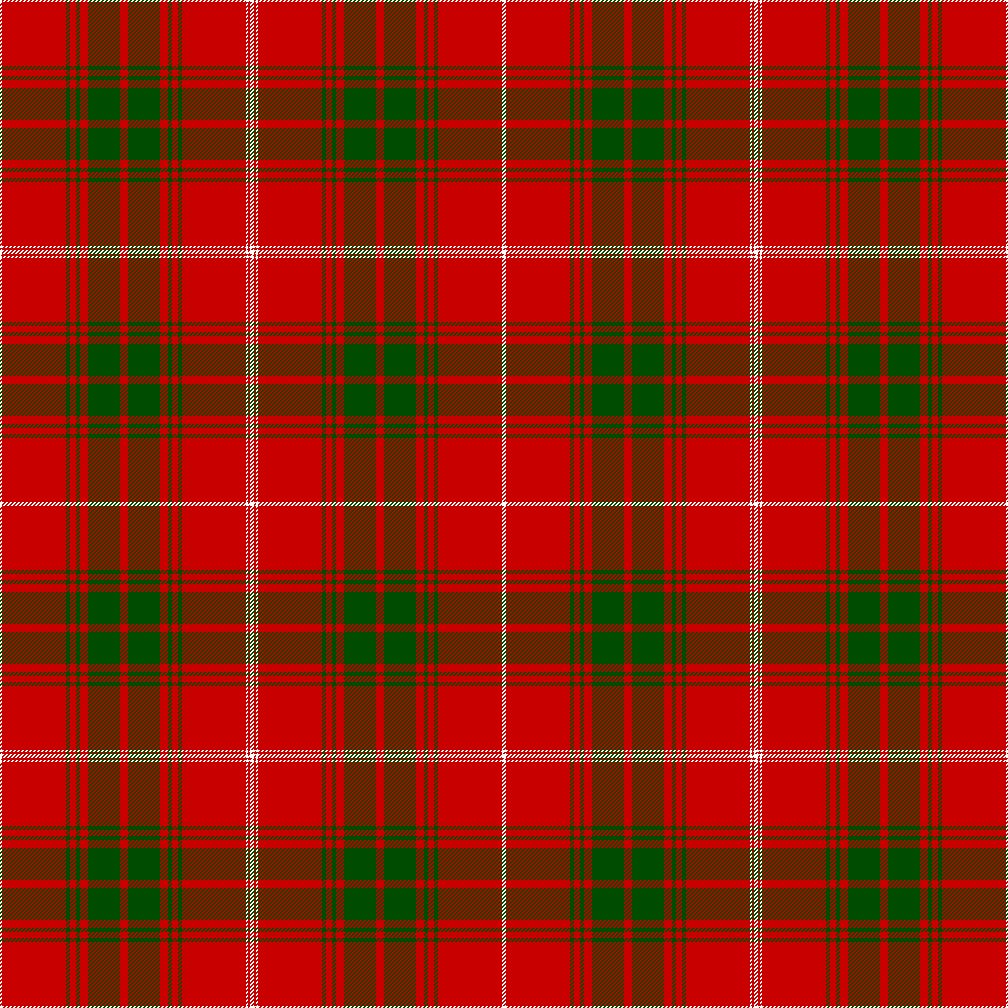
Duke of Rothesay tartan, from the Vestiarium Scoticum.

Another of the non-peerage titles belonging to the heir apparent, that of Lord of the Isles, merits special mention. The Lords of the Isles, of the MacDonald family, originally functioned as vassals of the Scottish, or Norwegian, kings who ruled the Western Isles. The ambitious John MacDonald II, fourth Lord of the Isles, made a secret treaty in 1462 with King Edward IV of England, by which he sought to make himself an independent ruler.

In 1475, James III discovered the Lord of the Isles' actions, and the Lordship became subject to forfeiture. MacDonald later regained his position, but James IV again deprived him of his titles in 1493 after his nephew provoked a rebellion. In 1540 James V of Scotland granted the Lordship to the heirs apparent to the Crown.

== Legal basis ==
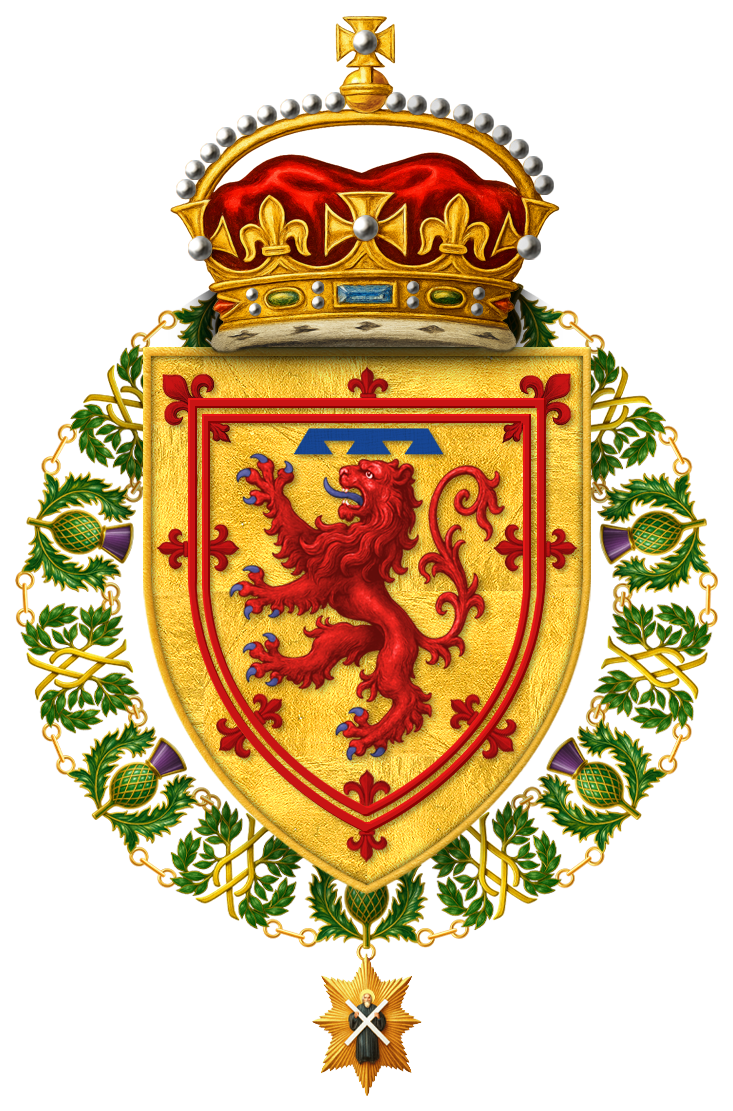
Arms of Prince Edward (later Edward VIII) as Duke of Rothesay, with collar of the Order of the Thistle and coronet of the heir apparent to the British throne.

An act of the Parliament of Scotland passed in 1469 governs the succession to most of these titles. It provides that "the first-born Prince of the King of Scots for ever" should hold the dukedom. If the firstborn prince dies before the king, the title is not inherited by his heir – it is only for the firstborn son, like the Duchy of Cornwall – nor is either inherited by the deceased duke's next brother, unless that brother also becomes heir apparent. Though the act specifies "king", eldest sons of queens regnant subsequently also held the dukedom. The interpretation of the word prince, however, does not include women. Therefore, in the event of an heiress presumptive or heiress apparent (this becoming a possibility after the passage of the Succession to the Crown Act 2013), she cannot become Duchess of Rothesay.

The eldest son of the British sovereign, as Duke of Rothesay, had the right to vote in elections for Scottish representative peers from 1707. (The 1707 Acts of Union between the Parliament of Scotland and Parliament of England formally unified both kingdoms to create the Kingdom of Great Britain.) This right continued until 1963, when the UK Parliament abolished the election of representative peers.

== List of dukes of Rothesay ==
Holders of the Dukedom of Rothesay, with the events by which they became dukes of Rothesay and by which they ceased to hold the title
Duke of Rothesay	Monarch	From	To	Other titles held while Duke
David	Robert III	1398 (created)	1402 (death)	Earl of Carrick and Earl of Atholl (1398), Baron Renfrew (?), Prince and Great Steward of Scotland (trad.)
James	Robert III	1404 (created)	1406 (acceded as James I)	Earl of Carrick (1404), Baron/Lord Renfrew, Prince and Great Steward of Scotland (1404)
Alexander	James I	1430 (birth?)	1430 (death)	Earl of Carrick (1430), Baron/Lord Renfrew, Prince and Great Steward of Scotland (1430)
James	James I	1431 (created)	1437 (acceded as James II)	Earl of Carrick (1431), Baron/Lord Renfrew, Prince and Great Steward of Scotland (1431)
James	James II	1452 (birth?)	1460 (acceded as James III)	Earl of Carrick (1452), Baron/Lord Renfrew, Prince and Great Steward of Scotland (1452)
James	James III	1473 (birth)	1488 (acceded as James IV)	Earl of Carrick and Baron/Lord Renfrew, Prince and Great Steward of Scotland (1469)
James	James IV	1507 (birth)	1508 (death)	Earl of Carrick and Baron/Lord Renfrew, Prince and Great Steward of Scotland (1469)
Arthur	James IV	1509 (birth)	1510 (death)	Duke of Albany (1509), Earl of Carrick and Baron/Lord Renfrew, Prince and Great Steward of Scotland (1469)
James	James IV	1512 (birth)	1513 (acceded as James V)	Earl of Carrick and Baron/Lord Renfrew, Prince and Great Steward of Scotland (1469)
James	James V	1540 (birth)	1541 (death)	Earl of Carrick and Baron/Lord Renfrew (1469), Lord of the Isles (1540), Prince and Great Steward of Scotland (1469)
James Charles	Mary	1566 (birth)	1567 (acceded as James VI)	Earl of Carrick and Baron/Lord Renfrew (1469), Lord of the Isles (1540), Prince and Great Steward of Scotland (1469)
Henry Frederick	James VI	1594 (birth)	1612 (death)	Prince of Wales and Earl of Chester (1610), Duke of Cornwall (1337), Earl of Carrick and Baron Renfrew (1469), Lord of the Isles (1540), Prince and Great Steward of Scotland (1469) (The italicised henceforth "Earl of Carrick, etc. 1469 & 1540)"
Charles	James VI	1612 (death of brother Henry)	1625 (acceded as Charles I)	Prince of Wales and Earl of Chester (1616), Duke of Cornwall (1337), Duke of Albany (1600), Duke of York (1605), Marquess of Ormond (1600), Earl of Carrick, etc. (1469 & 1540), Earl of Ross, Lord Ardmannoch (1600)
Charles James	Charles I	1629 (birth)	1629 (death)	Duke of Cornwall (1337), Earl of Carrick, etc. (1469 & 1540)
Charles	Charles I	1630 (birth)	1649 (acceded as Charles II)	Prince of Wales and Earl of Chester (1638), Duke of Cornwall (1337), Earl of Carrick, etc. (1469 & 1540)
James Francis Edward	James VII	1688 (birth)	1702 (attainted)	Prince of Wales and Earl of Chester (1688–1702), Duke of Cornwall (1337–1702), Earl of Carrick, etc. (1469 & 1540)
George	George I	1714 (father's accession)	1727 (acceded as George II)	Prince of Wales and Earl of Chester (1714), Hereditary Prince of Hanover, Duke of Cornwall (1337), Duke of Cambridge, Marquess of Cambridge (1706), Earl of Carrick, etc. (1469 & 1540), Earl of Milford Haven, Viscount Northallerton, Baron Tewkesbury (1706)
Frederick	George II	1727 (father's accession)	1751 (death)	Prince of Wales and Earl of Chester (1729), Duke of Cornwall (1337), Duke of Edinburgh, Marquess of Ely (1726), Earl of Carrick, etc. (1469 & 1540), Earl of Eltham, Viscount Launceston, Baron Snowdon (1726)
George	George III	1762 (birth)	1820 (acceded as George IV)	Prince of Wales and Earl of Chester (1762), Duke of Cornwall (1337), Earl of Carrick, etc. (1469 & 1540)
Albert Edward	Victoria	1841 (birth)	1901 (acceded as Edward VII)	Prince of Wales and Earl of Chester (1841), Duke of Cornwall (1337), Earl of Carrick, etc. (1469 & 1540), Earl of Dublin (1850)
George	Edward VII	1901 (father's accession)	1910 (acceded as George V)	Prince of Wales and Earl of Chester (1901), Duke of Cornwall (1337), Duke of York (1892), Earl of Carrick, etc. (1469 & 1540), Earl of Inverness, Baron Killarney (1892)
Edward	George V	1910 (father's accession)	1936 (acceded as Edward VIII)	Prince of Wales and Earl of Chester (1910), Duke of Cornwall (1337), Earl of Carrick, etc. (1469 & 1540)
Charles	Elizabeth II	1952 (mother's accession)	2022 (acceded as Charles III)	Prince of Wales and Earl of Chester (1958), Duke of Cornwall (1337), Duke of Edinburgh (1947), Earl of Carrick, etc. (1469 & 1540)
William	Charles III	2022 (father's accession)	Incumbent	Prince of Wales and Earl of Chester (2022), Duke of Cornwall (1337), Duke of Cambridge (2011), Earl of Carrick, etc. (1469 & 1540)

== Family tree ==
Family tree of the Princes of Wales, Dukes of Cornwall, Dukes of Rothesay, Earls of Carrick and Earls of Chester

Earl of Chester (1st creation), 1067–1070
Gerbod the Fleming (?); Earl of Chester	Richard Goz (d. after 1082)	King William I (c. 1028–1087)
Earldom of Chester (1st creation) forfeit, 1071
Earl of Chester (2nd creation), 1071
Maud (Margaret)	Hugh d'Avranches (c. 1047–1101); 1st Earl of Chester	Adela of Normandy (c. 1067–1137)	Stephen, Count of Blois (c. 1045–1102)	King Henry I (c. 1068–1135)
Ranulf le Meschin (1070–1129); 3rd Earl of Chester	Richard d'Avranches (1094–1120); 2nd Earl of Chester	Lucia-Mahaut (d. 1120)	Robert Rufus (c. 1090–1147); Earl of Gloucester
Ranulf de Gernon (1099–1153); 4th Earl of Chester	Maud (Matilda) of Gloucester (d. 1189)
Hugh of Cyfeiliog (1147–1181); 5th Earl of Chester
Ranulf de Blondeville (1170–1232); 6th Earl of Chester, Earl of Lincoln	Matilda (Maud) (1171–1233); Countess of Chester suo jure
Earl of Chester (4th creation), 1264
John of Scotland (c. 1207–1237); 7th Earl of Chester, Earl of Huntingdon	Simon de Montfort (1208–1265); Earl of Chester, Earl of Leicester
Earldom of Chester (2nd creation) reverted to the crown, 1237	Earl of Chester (3rd creation), 1254	Earldom of Chester (4th creation) forfeit, 1265
Edward, Lord of Chester (1239–1307); Earl of Chester (without the title of Earl), later King Edward I
Earldom of Chester (3rd creation) reverted to the crown, 1272
Earl of Chester (5th creation), 1301
Edward of Caernarfon (1284–1327); Prince of Wales and Earl of Chester; 1301–1307, later King Edward II
Earldom of Chester (5th creation) reverted to the crown, 1307
Earl of Chester (6th creation), 1312
Robert Stewart (1316–1390); Earl of Carrick (1316–1368), later King Robert II of Scots	Edward Plantagenet (1312–1377); Earl of Chester (1312–1327), later King Edward III
Hereafter, the Earldom of Chester was created in conjunction with the Principality of Wales.
Duke of Cornwall, 1337
John Stewart (1337–1406); Earl of Carrick (1368–1390), later King Robert III of Scots	Edward the Black Prince (1330–1376); Duke of Cornwall (1337–1376), Prince of Wales (1343–1376)	John of Gaunt (1340–1399); Duke of Lancaster	Lionel of Antwerp (1338–1368); Duke of Clarence	Edmund of Langley (1341–1402); Duke of York
Dukedom of Cornwall extinct, 1376
Duke of Cornwall, 1376
Richard of Bordeaux (1367–1400); Prince of Wales (1376–1377), Duke of Cornwall (1376–1377), later King Richard II	John Beaufort (c. 1371–1410)	King Henry IV (1366–1413)	Philippa of Clarence (1355–1382)
Dukedom of Cornwall merged in the Crown, 1377
Roger Mortimer (1374–1398)
Duke of Rothesay created, 1398	Duke of Cornwall restored, 1399
David Stewart (1378–1402); Earl of Carrick (1390–1402); Duke of Rothesay (1398–1402)	Henry of Monmouth (1386–1422); Prince of Wales (1399–1413), Duke of Cornwall (1399–1413), later King Henry V	Anne de Mortimer (1390–1411)	Richard of Conisburgh (c. 1375–1415); Earl of Cambridge
Duke of Cornwall, 1460
James (1394–1437); Earl of Carrick (1402–1406); Duke of Rothesay (1404–1406), later King James I of Scots	Joan Beaufort (c. 1404–1445)	John Beaufort (1404–1444); Duke of Somerset	Henry (1421–1471); Duke of Cornwall (1421–1422), later King Henry VI	Richard Plantagenet (1411–1460); Duke of York; Prince of Wales (1460), Duke of Cornwall (1460)
Alexander Stewart (1430); Duke of Rothesay (1430)	James (1430–1460); Duke of Rothesay (1431–1437), later King James II of Scots	Margaret Beaufort (1443–1509)	King Edward IV (1442–1483)	King Richard III (1452–1485)
James (1451–1488); Duke of Rothesay (1452–1460), later King James III of Scots	King Henry VII (1457–1509)	Edward of Westminster (1453–1471); Prince of Wales (1454–1471), Duke of Cornwall (1454–1471)
From the 1469 Act of Scottish Parliament, the Earldom of Carrick and the Dukedom of Rothesay was to be automatically held by the "first-born Prince of the King of Scots."
James (1473–1513); Duke of Rothesay (1473–1488), later King James IV of Scots	Margaret Tudor (1489–1541)	Arthur Tudor (1486–1502); Prince of Wales (1489–1502), Duke of Cornwall (1486–1502)	Henry Tudor (1491–1547); Prince of Wales (1504–1509), Duke of Cornwall (1502–1509), later King Henry VIII	Edward (1470–1483); Prince of Wales (1471–1483), Duke of Cornwall (1471–1483), later King Edward V	Edward of Middleham (c. 1473–1484); Prince of Wales (1483–1484), Duke of Cornwall (1483–1484)
James Stewart (1507–1508); Duke of Rothesay (1507–1508)	Arthur Stewart (1509–1510); Duke of Rothesay (1509–1510)	James (1512–1542); Duke of Rothesay (1512–1513), later King James V of Scots	Henry (1511); Duke of Cornwall (1511)	Edward Tudor (1537–1553); Prince of Wales (1537–1547), Duke of Cornwall (1537–1547), later King Edward VI
James Stewart (1540–1541); Duke of Rothesay (1540–1541)	Mary, Queen of Scots (1542–1587)
James Charles Stuart (1566–1625); Duke of Rothesay (1566–1567), later King James VI/I
Henry Frederick Stuart (1594–1612); Prince of Wales (1610–1612), Duke of Cornwall (1603–1612), Duke of Rothesay (1594–1612)	Elizabeth Stuart (1596–1662)	Charles Stuart (1600–1649); Prince of Wales (1616–1625), Duke of Cornwall (1612–1625), Duke of Rothesay (1612–1625), later King Charles I
Sophia of Hanover (1630–1714)	Charles James (1629); Duke of Cornwall (1629), Duke of Rothesay (1629), styled Prince of Wales	Charles Stuart (1630–1685); Prince of Wales (c. 1638/1641–1649), Duke of Cornwall (1630–1649), Duke of Rothesay (1630–1649), later King Charles II	King James II/VII (1633–1701)
King George I (1660–1727)
George Augustus (1683–1760); Prince of Wales (1714–1727), Duke of Cornwall (1714–1727), Duke of Rothesay (1714–1727), later King George II	James Francis Edward Stuart (1688–1766); Prince of Wales (c. 1688–1688), Duke of Cornwall (1688–1702), Duke of Rothesay (1688–1702)
Frederick Louis (1707–1751); Prince of Wales (1729–1751), Duke of Cornwall (1727–1751), Duke of Rothesay (1727–1751)
George William Frederick (1738–1820); Prince of Wales (1751–1760), later King George III
George Augustus Frederick (1762–1830); Prince of Wales (1762–1820), Duke of Cornwall (1762–1820), Duke of Rothesay (1762–1820), later King George IV	Edward Augustus (1767–1820); Duke of Kent and Strathearn
Queen Victoria (1819–1901)
Albert Edward (1841–1910); Prince of Wales (1841–1901), Duke of Cornwall (1841–1901), Duke of Rothesay (1841–1901), later King Edward VII
George Frederick Ernest Albert (1865–1936); Prince of Wales (1901–1910), Duke of Cornwall (1901–1910), Duke of Rothesay (1901–1910), later King George V
Edward Albert Christian George Andrew Patrick David (1894–1972); Prince of Wales (1910–1936), Duke of Cornwall (1910–1936), Duke of Rothesay (1910–1936), later King Edward VIII, later Duke of Windsor	King George VI (1895–1952)
Queen Elizabeth II (1926–2022)
Charles Philip Arthur George (b. 1948); Prince of Wales (1958–2022), Duke of Cornwall (1952–2022), Duke of Rothesay (1952–2022), later King Charles III
William Arthur Philip Louis (b. 1982); Prince of Wales (since 2022), Duke of Cornwall (since 2022), Duke of Rothesay (since 2022), Duke of Cambridge
Prince George of Wales (b. 2013)

Family tree of British royal dukes

Includes dukes of: Albany, Albemarle, Bedford, Cambridge, Clarence, Connaught and Strathearn, Cumberland, Edinburgh, Gloucester, Gloucester and Edinburgh, Hereford, Kent, Kintyre and Lorne, Norfolk, Ross, Somerset, Sussex, Windsor, and York, but only when royally.

Non-royal dukes are not included; see Royal dukedoms in the United Kingdom.
Also not included are titles mandated for use by the heir apparent (Duke of Rothesay and the 1337 creation of the Duke of Cornwall), see Princes of Wales family tree.

King Robert II; 1316–1390	King Edward III; 1312–1377
Duke of Albany (1st creation), 1398	Duke of Clarence (1st creation), 1362	Duke of York (1st creation), 1385
King Robert III c. 1337–1406	Robert Stewart c. 1340–1420; 1st Duke of Albany	Edward the Black Prince; 1330–1376	Lionel of Antwerp; 1338–1368; Duke of Clarence	John of Gaunt; 1340–1399	Edmund; 1341–1402; 1st Duke of York
Dukedom of Clarence (1st creation) extinct, 1368
Duke of Cornwall (2nd creation), 1376	Duke of Hereford, 1397	Duke of Gloucester (1st creation), 1385
Murdoch Stewart c. 1362–1425; 2nd Duke of Albany	Richard of Bordeaux; 1367–1400; Duke of Cornwall, later King Richard II	Henry Bolingbroke; 1367–1413; Duke of Hereford, later King Henry IV	Thomas of Woodstock; 1355–1397; Duke of Gloucester
Dukedom of Albany (1st creation) forfeit, 1425	Dukedom of Cornwall (2nd creation) merged in the crown, 1377	Dukedom of Hereford merged in the crown, 1399	Dukedom of Gloucester (1st creation) extinct, 1397
Duke of Clarence (2nd creation), 1412	Duke of Bedford (1st & 2nd creations), 1414	Duke of Gloucester (2nd creation), 1414	Duke of Albemarle (Aumale) (1st creation), 1397
Thomas of Lancaster; 1387–1421; Duke of Clarence	John of Lancaster; 1389–1435; Duke of Bedford; Surrendered dukedom and then regranted, 1433	Humphrey of Lancaster; 1390–1447; Duke of Gloucester	John Beaufort; 1373–1410	Joan Beaufort c. 1379–1440	Edward of Norwich c. 1373–1415; Duke of Aumale, 2nd Duke of York	Richard of Conisburgh; 1385–1415
Dukedom of Clarence (2nd creation) extinct, 1421	Dukedom of Bedford (2nd creation) extinct, 1435	Dukedom of Gloucester (2nd creation) extinct, 1447	Dukedom of Albemarle (Aumale) (1st creation) forfeit, 1399
Duke of York (1st creation) restored, 1425; Duke of Cornwall (3rd creation), 1460
King James I 1394–1437	Joan Beaufort c. 1404–1445	Owen Tudor c. 1400–1461	John Beaufort; 1404–1444	Richard Neville; 1400–1460	Cecily Neville; 1415–1495	Richard of York; 1411–1460; 3rd Duke of York, Duke of Cornwall
Duke of Cornwall (3rd creation) extinct, 1460
Duke of Bedford (5th creation), 1485	Duke of Clarence (3rd creation), 1461	Duke of Gloucester (3rd creation), 1461
King James II; 1430–1460	Jasper Tudor c. 1431–1495; Duke of Bedford	Edmund Tudor c. 1430–1456	Lady Margaret Beaufort; 1443–1509	John Neville c. 1431–1471	Elizabeth Woodville c. 1437–1492	Edward; 1442–1483; 4th Duke of York, later King Edward IV	George Plantagenet; 1449–1478; Duke of Clarence	Richard of York; 1452–1485; Duke of Gloucester, later King Richard III
Dukedom of Bedford (5th creation) extinct, 1495	Dukedom of York (1st creation) merged in the Crown, 1461	Dukedom of Clarence (3rd creation) forfeit, 1478	Dukedom of Gloucester (3rd creation) merged in the Crown, 1483
Duke of Albany (2nd creation), 1458	Duke of Bedford (3rd creation), 1470	Duke of York (2nd creation), 1474; Duke of Norfolk (3rd creation), 1477	Duke of Bedford (4th creation), 1478
Alexander Stewart c. 1454–1485; 1st Duke of Albany	King James III; 1451/1452–1488	George Neville; 1457–1483; Duke of Bedford	King Henry VII; 1457–1509	Elizabeth of York; 1466–1503	Richard of Shrewsbury; 1473–1483; Duke of York, Duke of Norfolk	George of York; 1477–1479; Duke of Bedford
Dukedom of Bedford (3rd creation) forfeit, 1478	Dukedom of York (2nd creation) and Dukedom of Norfolk (3rd creation) extinct, 1483	Dukedom of Bedford (4th creation) extinct, 1479
Duke of Ross (1st creation), 1488	Duke of York (3rd creation), 1494	Duke of Somerset (3rd creation), 1499
John Stewart; 1482–1536; 2nd Duke of Albany	James Stewart; 1476–1504; Duke of Ross	King James IV; 1473–1513	Margaret Tudor; 1489–1541	Henry; 1491–1547; Duke of York, later King Henry VIII	Edmund Tudor; 1499–1500; Duke of Somerset (nominated but probably not invested)
Dukedom of Albany (2nd creation) extinct, 1536	Dukedom of Ross (1st creation) extinct, 1504	Dukedom of York (3rd creation) merged in the Crown, 1509	Dukedom of Somerset (3rd creation) extinct, 1500
Duke of Ross (2nd creation), 1514
King James V 1512–1542	Alexander Stewart; 1514–1515; Duke of Ross
Duke of Albany (3rd creation), 1565	Dukedom of Ross (2nd creation) extinct, 1515
Henry Stuart; 1546–1567; 1st Duke of Albany	Queen Mary; 1542–1587
James; 1566–1625; 2nd Duke of Albany, later King James VI & I
Dukedom of Albany (3rd creation) merged in the Crown, 1567
Duke of Albany (4th creation), 1604; Duke of York (4th creation), 1605	Duke of Kintyre and Lorne, 1602
Elizabeth Stuart; 1596–1662	Henry Frederick; 1594–1612	Charles; 1600–1649; Duke of Albany, Duke of York, later King Charles I	Robert Stuart; 1602; Duke of Kintyre and Lorne
Dukedom of Albany (4th creation), Dukedom of York (4th creation) merged in the Crown, 1625	Dukedom of Kintyre and Lorne extinct, 1602
Duke of York (5th creation) 1644; Duke of Albany (5th creation), 1660	Duke of Gloucester (4th creation), 1659
Sophia of Hanover; 1630–1714	James Stuart; 1633–1701; Duke of York, Duke of Albany, later King James VII & II	Henry; 1640–1660; Duke of Gloucester
Dukedom of Albany (5th creation) and Dukedom of York (5th creation) merged in the Crown, 1685	Dukedom of Gloucester (4th creation) extinct, 1660
Duke of York and Albany (1st creation), 1716	Duke of Cambridge (1st creation), 1664	Duke of Kendal (1st creation), 1666	Duke of Cambridge (2nd creation), 1667
King George I 1660–1727	Ernest Augustus; 1674–1728; Duke of York and Albany	Charles Stuart; 1660–1661 styled Duke of Cambridge	James Stuart; 1663–1667; Duke of Cambridge	Queen Anne; 1665–1714	Charles Stuart; 1666–1667 designated Duke of Kendal	Edgar Stuart; 1667–1671; Duke of Cambridge	Charles Stuart; 1677 styled Duke of Cambridge
Dukedom of York and Albany (1st creation) extinct, 1728	Dukedom of Cambridge (1st creation) extinct, 1667	Dukedom of Kendal (1st creation), extinct, 1667	Dukedom of Cambridge (2nd creation) extinct, 1671
Duke of Cambridge (3rd creation)
George; 1683–1760; Duke of Cambridge, later King George II	William; 1689–1700 styled Duke of Gloucester
Dukedom of Cambridge (3rd creation) merged with the Crown, 1727
Duke of Edinburgh (1st creation), 1726	Duke of Cumberland (3rd creation), 1726
Frederick; 1707–1751; 1st Duke of Edinburgh, styled Duke of Gloucester until created Duke of Edinburgh	William Augustus; 1721–1765; Duke of Cumberland
Dukedom of Cumberland (3rd creation) extinct, 1765
Duke of York and Albany (2nd creation), 1760	Duke of Gloucester and Edinburgh, 1764	Duke of Cumberland and Strathearn, 1766
George; 1738–1820; 2nd Duke of Edinburgh, later King George III	Edward; 1739–1767; Duke of York and Albany	William Henry; 1743–1805; 1st Duke of Gloucester and Edinburgh	Henry; 1745–1790; Duke of Cumberland and Strathearn
Dukedom of Edinburgh (1st creation), merged in the Crown, 1760	Dukedom of York and Albany (2nd creation) extinct, 1767	Dukedom of Cumberland and Strathearn extinct, 1790
Duke of York and Albany (3rd creation), 1784	Duke of Clarence and St Andrews, 1789	Duke of Kent and Strathearn, 1799	Duke of Cumberland and Teviotdale, 1799	Duke of Sussex (1st creation), 1801	Duke of Cambridge (4th creation), 1801
Frederick; 1763–1827; Duke of York and Albany	William Henry; 1765–1837, Duke of Clarence and St Andrews, later King William IV	Edward; 1767–1820; Duke of Kent and Strathearn	Ernest Augustus; 1771–1851; King of Hanover, 1st Duke of Cumberland and Teviotdale	Augustus Frederick; 1773–1843; Duke of Sussex	Adolphus; 1774–1850; 1st Duke of Cambridge	Mary; 1776–1857	William Frederick; 1776–1834; 2nd Duke of Gloucester and Edinburgh
Dukedom of York and Albany (3rd creation) extinct, 1827	Dukedom of Clarence and St Andrews merged in the Crown, 1830	Dukedom of Kent and Strathearn extinct, 1820	Dukedom of Sussex (1st creation) extinct, 1843	Dukedom of Gloucester and Edinburgh extinct, 1834
Queen Victoria; 1819–1901	George V 1819–1878; King of Hanover, 2nd Duke of Cumberland and Teviotdale	George; 1819–1904; 2nd Duke of Cambridge	Mary Adelaide; 1833–1897
Dukedom of Cambridge (4th creation) extinct, 1904
Duke of Edinburgh (2nd creation), 1866	Duke of Connaught and Strathearn, 1874	Duke of Albany (6th creation), 1881
King Edward VII; 1841–1910	Ernest Augustus; 1845–1923; 3rd Duke of Cumberland and Teviotdale	Alice; 1843–1878	Alfred Ernest Albert; 1844–1900; Duke of Edinburgh	Arthur; 1850–1942; 1st Duke of Connaught and Strathearn	Leopold; 1853–1884; 1st Duke of Albany
Dukedom of Cumberland and Teviotdale forfeit, 1919	Dukedom of Edinburgh (2nd creation) extinct, 1900
Duke of Clarence and Avondale, 1890	Duke of York (6th creation), 1892
Albert Victor; 1864–1892; Duke of Clarence and Avondale	George; 1865–1936; Duke of York, later King George V	Mary of Teck; 1867–1953	Victoria of Hesse and by Rhine; 1863–1950	Arthur of Connaught; 1883–1938
Dukedom of Clarence and Avondale extinct, 1892	Dukedom of York (6th creation) merged in the Crown, 1910
Duke of Windsor, 1937	Duke of York (7th creation), 1920	Duke of Kent (2nd creation), 1934	Duke of Gloucester (5th creation), 1928
King Edward VIII; 1894–1972; Later Duke of Windsor	Albert; 1895–1952; Duke of York, later King George VI	Alice of Battenberg; 1885–1969	George; 1902–1942; 1st Duke of Kent	Henry; 1900–1974; 1st Duke of Gloucester	Alastair Arthur; 1914–1943; 2nd Duke of Connaught and Strathearn	Charles Edward; 1884–1954; 2nd Duke of Albany
Dukedom of Windsor extinct, 1972	Dukedom of York (7th creation) merged in the Crown, 1936	Dukedom of Connaught and Strathearn extinct, 1943	Dukedom of Albany (6th creation) forfeit, 1919
Duke of Edinburgh (3rd creation), 1947
Queen Elizabeth II; 1926–2022	Philip; 1921–2021; 1st Duke of Edinburgh	Edward b. 1935; 2nd Duke of Kent
Duke of York (8th creation), 1986 (revoked 2025)	Duke of Edinburgh (4th creation), 2023
Charles b. 1948; 2nd Duke of Edinburgh, later King Charles III	Andrew b. 1960; Duke of York	Edward b. 1964; Duke of Edinburgh	George Windsor b. 1962	Richard b. 1944; 2nd Duke of Gloucester
Dukedom of Edinburgh (3rd creation) merged in the Crown, 2022	No male heirs	Dukedom of Edinburgh (4th creation) is a life peerage and therefore not hereditary	Heir apparent to the Dukedom of Kent
Duke of Cambridge (5th creation), 2011	Duke of Sussex (2nd creation), 2018
William b. 1982; Duke of Cambridge	Harry b. 1984; Duke of Sussex	Edward Windsor b. 1988	Alexander Windsor b. 1974
Heir-apparent to the Dukedom of Gloucester
George of Wales b. 2013	Archie of Sussex b. 2019
Heir apparent to the Dukedom of Cambridge	Heir apparent to the Dukedom of Sussex

== Current holder ==
Since 2022 William, Prince of Wales, has held the title of Duke of Rothesay, and uses it when in Scotland. He has the formal Scottish style of HRH The Prince William, Duke of Rothesay.

The personal arms of the preceding Duke were bestowed upon him in 1974 by Queen Elizabeth II. The escutcheon honours Stewart of Appin, (David Stewart being the first to hold the title), and features on the 1st and 4th quarters the arms of the Great Steward of Scotland, with the 2nd and 3rd quarters featuring the arms of the Lord of the Isles. The arms of the current Duke are distinguished from those of Clan Stewart of Appin through the addition of an inescutcheon displaying the arms of the heir apparent to the King of Scots, namely the royal arms of Scotland with a three-point label azure for difference. The full achievement of the current Duke's arms are a variation of the royal arms of Scotland used prior to the Union of the Crowns in 1603.

Royal Standard of the Duke of Rothesay, namely the Royal Banner of Scotland differenced with a plain blue label of three-points.

Personal arms of Prince William, Duke of Rothesay.

Personal banner of Prince William, Duke of Rothesay.

Full armorial achievement of His Royal Highness The Prince William, Duke of Rothesay, Earl of Carrick, Baron of Renfrew, Lord of the Isles, Prince and Great Steward of Scotland.
