= Duchess of Albany =

The title Duchess of Albany may refer to:

== People ==
The title Duchess of Albany, held by the wives of the Dukes of Albany, may refer to:

- Isabella, Countess of Lennox, wife of Murdoch Stewart
- Anne, Countess of Auvergne, wife of John Stewart
- Anne Hyde, first wife of James, Duke of York
- Mary of Modena (1658–1718), second wife of James, Duke of York, later Queen of England and Scotland
- Charlotte Stuart, Duchess of Albany, illegitimate daughter of Bonnie Prince Charlie
- Princess Helena of Waldeck and Pyrmont, wife of Prince Leopold, Duke of Albany, youngest son of Queen Victoria
- Princess Victoria Adelaide of Schleswig-Holstein, wife of Charles Edward, Duke of Saxe-Coburg and Gotha, Duke of Albany

== Vehicles ==
- Duchess of Albany, an iron 3-masted ship named after Princess Helena of Waldeck and Pyrmont
- PS Duchess of Albany (1889), a passenger vessel
- Duchess of Albany, one of the GWR 3031 Class locomotives that were built for and run on the Great Western Railway between 1891 and 1915

== Other ==
- Clematis texensis, a plant sometimes known as 'Duchess of Albany'

== See also ==
- Duke of Albany, a peerage title
