= Alexander Stewart, Duke of Rothesay =

Scottish prince; elder twin son of James I of Scotland and Joan Beaufort

Alexander Stewart (16 October 1430 - before 22 April 1431), Duke of Rothesay, was the eldest of the twin sons of James I of Scotland and Joan Beaufort. The twins were born in Holyrood Palace, Edinburgh. He died in infancy, and his younger twin brother became James II of Scotland.

== Ancestry ==
Ancestors of Alexander Stewart, Duke of Rothesay

8. Robert II of Scotland
4. Robert III of Scotland
9. Elizabeth Mure
2. James I of Scotland
10. Sir John Drummond, 11th of Lennox
5. Anabella Drummond
11. Mary Montifex
1. Alexander Stewart, Duke of Rothesay
12. John of Gaunt, 1st Duke of Lancaster
6. John Beaufort, 1st Earl of Somerset
13. Katherine Swynford
3. Joan Beaufort
14. Thomas Holland, 2nd Earl of Kent
7. Margaret Holland
15. Alice FitzAlan
