= Duke of Albany =

Title in British peerage

Dukedom of Albany
- Arms of Prince Leopold, Duke of Albany
- Creation date: 24 May 1881
- Creation: Sixth
- Created by: Queen Victoria
- Peerage: Peerage of the United Kingdom
- First holder: Prince Leopold
- Last holder: Prince Charles Edward
- Remainder to: the 1st Duke's heirs male of the body lawfully begotten
- Subsidiary titles: Earl of Clarence; Baron Arklow
- Status: Suspended under the Titles Deprivation Act 1917 on 28 March 1919

Arms of the Albany Stewarts

Duke of Albany is a peerage title that has occasionally been bestowed on younger sons in the Scottish and later the British royal family, particularly in the Houses of Stuart and Hanover.

== History ==
The Dukedom of Albany was first granted in 1398 by King Robert III of Scotland to his brother, Robert Stewart, the title being in the Peerage of Scotland. "Albany" was a broad territorial term representing the parts of Scotland north of the River Forth, roughly the former Kingdom of the Picts. The title (along with the Dukedom of Rothesay) was one of the first two dukedoms created in Scotland. It passed to Robert's son Murdoch Stewart, and was forfeited in 1425 due to the attainder of Murdoch.

The title was again created in 1458 for Alexander Stewart but was forfeited in 1483. His son John Stewart was restored to the second creation in 1515 but died without heirs in 1536. In 1541, Robert, the second son of James V of Scotland, was styled Duke of Albany, but he died at less than a month old. The fourth creation, along with the Earldom of Ross and Lordship of Ardmannoch, was for Mary, Queen of Scots' king consort Lord Darnley, whose son, later James VI of Scotland, I of England and Ireland, inherited the titles on his death. That creation merged with the Scottish crown upon James's ascension. The title, along with the title of Duke of York, with which it has since been traditionally coupled, was created for a fifth time in 1600 for Charles, son of James VI and I. Upon Charles's ascent to the throne in 1625, the title of Duke of Albany merged once again into the crown.

The title was next granted in 1660 to Charles I's son, James, by Charles II. When James succeeded his elder brother to the throne in 1685, the titles again merged into the crown. The cities of New York and Albany, New York were thus both named after James, as he was the Duke of York and of Albany. The Jacobite pretender Charles Edward Stuart gave the title Duchess of Albany to his illegitimate daughter Charlotte; she died in 1789.

The title "Duke of York and Albany" was granted three times by the Hanoverian kings.

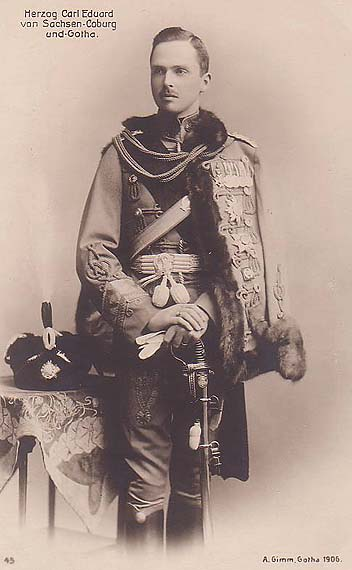
HRH Prince Charles Edward, the last person to hold the title, was deprived thereof in 1919.

The title of "Albany" alone was granted for the fifth time, this time in the Peerage of the United Kingdom, in 1881 to Prince Leopold, the fourth son of Queen Victoria. Prince Leopold's son, Prince Charles Edward (who had succeeded as reigning Duke of Saxe-Coburg and Gotha in 1900), was deprived of the peerage in 1919 for bearing arms against the United Kingdom in World War I. His grandson, Ernst Leopold (1935–1996), only son of Charles Edward's eldest son Johann Leopold, Hereditary Prince of Saxe-Coburg and Gotha (1906–1972), sometimes used the title "Duke of Albany", although the Titles Deprivation Act 1917 stipulates that any successor of a suspended peer shall be restored to the peerage only by direction of the sovereign, the successor's petition for restoration having been submitted for and obtained a satisfactory review of the appropriate Privy Council committee.

== Dukes of Albany ==
=== First creation, 1398 ===
Other titles (1st Duke): Earl of Fife (1371), Earl of Buchan (1374–1406), Earl of Atholl (1403–1406)

- Robert Stewart, Duke of Albany (c. 1340–1420), third son of Robert II of Scotland

Other titles (2nd Duke): Earl of Menteith (bef 1189), Earl of Fife (1371), Earl of Buchan (1374)

- Murdoch Stewart, Duke of Albany (1362–1425), eldest son of the 1st Duke was attainted and his honours forfeit in 1425

=== Second creation, 1458 ===
Other titles (1st Duke): Earl of March (1455), Earl of Mar and Earl of Garioch (1482)

- Alexander Stewart, Duke of Albany (c. 1454–1485), second son of James II, forfeited his honours in 1479, was restored in 1482, then forfeited them again in 1483

Other titles (2nd Duke): Earl of March (1455)

- John Stewart, Duke of Albany (1482–1536), only legitimate son of the 1st Duke, was restored to his father's dukedom and Earldom of March in 1515. The honours became extinct upon his death without issue

=== Only styled, 1541 ===
Duke	Portrait	Birth	Marriage(s)	Death
Robert Stewart; House of Stuart; 1541–1541	no portrait	12 April 1541; Falkland Palace, Falkland, Fife; Son of James V of Scotland and Mary of Guise	not married	20 April 1541; Falkland Palace, Falkland, Fife aged 8 days

=== Third creation, 1565 ===
Duke	Portrait	Birth	Marriage(s)	Death
Henry Stuart; House of Stuart; 1565–1567 also: Earl of Ross and Lord Ardmannoch (1565)	Henry Stuart	19 November 1545; Dunfermline Palace, Dunfermline; Son of Matthew Stewart, 4th Earl of Lennox and Lady Margaret Douglas	Mary, Queen of Scots; 29 July 1565; 1 child	10 February 1567; Kirk o' Field, Edinburgh aged 21
James Stuart; House of Stuart; 1567 also: Earl of Ross and Lord Ardmannoch (1565); Duke of Rothesay (1398)	James Stuart	19 June 1566; Edinburgh Castle, Edinburgh; Son of Henry Stuart, Lord Darnley and Mary, Queen of Scots	Anne of Denmark; 23 November 1589; 9 children	27 March 1625; De Vere Theobalds Estate, Cheshunt aged 58
Prince James succeeded as James VI in 1567 upon his mother's abdication, and his titles merged with the crown.

=== Fourth creation, 1600 ===
Duke	Portrait	Birth	Marriage(s)	Death
Charles Stuart; House of Stuart; 1600–1625 also: Marquess of Ormond, Earl of Ross, Lord Ardmannoch (1600–1625); Duke of York (1605–1625); Prince of Wales (1616), Duke of Cornwall (1337) and Duke of Rothesay (1398)	Charles Stuart	19 November 1600; Dunfermline Palace, Dunfermline; Son of James VI and I and Anne of Denmark	Henrietta Maria of France; 13 June 1625; 9 children	30 January 1649; Whitehall Palace, London aged 48
Prince Charles succeeded as Charles I in 1625 upon his father's death, and his titles merged with the crown.

=== Fifth creation, 1660 ===
Duke	Portrait	Birth	Marriage(s)	Death
James Stuart; House of Stuart; 1633 or 1644 – 1685 also: Duke of York (1633/1644), Earl of Ulster (1659)	James Stuart	14 October 1633; St. James's Palace, London; Son of Charles I of England and Henrietta Maria of France	Anne Hyde; 3 September 1660; 8 children Mary of Modena; 21 November 1673; 7 children	16 September 1701; Château de Saint-Germain-en-Laye, Paris aged 67
Prince James succeeded as James II in 1685 upon his brother's death, and his titles merged with the crown.

=== Sixth creation, 1881 ===
Duke	Portrait	Birth	Marriage(s)	Death
Prince Leopold; House of Saxe-Coburg and Gotha; 1882–1884 also: Earl of Clarence and Baron Arklow (1881)	Prince Arthur	7 April 1853; Buckingham Palace, London; Son of Queen Victoria and Prince Albert	Princess Helena of Waldeck and Pyrmont; 27 April 1882; 2 children	28 March 1884; Villa Nevada, Cannes aged 30
Prince Charles Edward; House of Saxe-Coburg and Gotha; 1884–1919 also: Earl of Clarence and Baron Arklow (1881)	Prince Arthur	19 July 1884; Claremont, Esher; Son of Prince Leopold, Duke of Albany and Princess Helena of Waldeck and Pyrmont	Princess Victoria Adelaide of Schleswig-Holstein; 11 October 1905; 5 children	6 March 1954; Coburg aged 69
The Titles Deprivation Act 1917 suspended the title on 28 March 1919.

Johann Leopold, Hereditary Prince of Saxe-Coburg and Gotha, Ernst Leopold Prinz von Sachsen-Coburg und Gotha, and Hubertus Prinz von Sachsen-Coburg und Gotha have in succession been the heirs entitled to petition for restoration of this title but have not done so.

== Family trees ==
Peerages of Albany, Arklow, Inverness, Ulster and York family tree

Earl of Ulster (1st Irish creation), 1205
Hugh de Lacy c. 1176–1271; Earl of Ulster
Earl of Ulster (2nd Irish creation), 1264
Maud de Lacy	Walter de Burgh c. 1210–1271; 1st Earl of Ulster, 2nd Lord of Connaught
Richard Óg de Burgh; 1259–1326; 2nd Earl of Ulster
John de Burgh d. 1313
Robert II of Scotland; 1316–1390	Edward III of England; 1312–1377	William Donn de Burgh; 1312–1333; 3rd Earl of Ulster
Lionel of Antwerp; 1338–1368; Duke of Clarence, Earl of Ulster (jure uxoris)	Elizabeth de Burgh; 1332–1363; 4th Countess of Ulster suo jure
Duke of Albany (1st creation), 1398	Duke of York (1st creation), 1385
Robert III of Scotland; 1337–1406	Robert Stewart c. 1340–1420; 1st Duke of Albany	Edmund of Langley; 1341–1402; 1st Duke of York	Philippa of Clarence; 1355–1382; 5th Countess of Ulster
Murdoch Stewart; 1362–1425; 2nd Duke of Albany	Roger Mortimer; 1374–1398; 6th Earl of Ulster, Earl of March
Dukedom of Albany (1st creation) forfeit, 1425
Edward of Norwich; 1373–1415; 2nd Duke of York	Richard of Conisburgh; 1375–1415; Earl of Cambridge	Anne Mortimer; 1388–c. 1411	Edmund Mortimer; 1391–1425; 7th Earl of Ulster, Earl of March
James I of Scotland; 1394–1437	Richard of York; 1411–1460; 3rd Duke of York, 8th Earl of Ulster, Earl of March
James II of Scotland; 1430–1460	Prince Edward; 1442–1483; 4th Duke of York, 9th Earl of Ulster, Earl of March; Later Edward IV of England
Dukedom of York (1st creation) and Earldom of Ulster (2nd Irish creation) merged in the Crown, 1461
Duke of Albany (2nd creation), 1458	Duke of York (2nd creation), 1474
Alexander Stewart; 1454–1485; 1st Duke of Albany	James III of Scotland; 1451–1488	Elizabeth of York; 1466–1503	Richard of Shrewsbury; 1473–1483; Duke of York
Dukedom of Albany (2nd creation) forfeit, 1479 restored, 1482 forfeited, 1483	Dukedom of York (2nd creation) extinct, 1483
Duke of Albany (2nd creation) restored, 1515	Duke of York (3rd creation), 1494
John Stewart; 1484–1536; 2nd Duke of Albany	James IV of Scotland; 1473–1513	Margaret Tudor; 1489–1541	Prince Henry; 1491–1547; Duke of York; Later Henry VIII of England
Dukedom of Albany (2nd creation) extinct, 1536	Dukedom of York (3rd creation) merged in the Crown, 1509
James V of Scotland; 1512–1542
Duke of Albany (3rd creation), 1565
Prince Arthur Stewart; 1541 styled Duke of Albany	Mary, Queen of Scots; 1542–1587	Henry Stuart, Lord Darnley; 1545–1567; 1st Duke of Albany
Prince James; 1566–1625; 2nd Duke of Albany; Later James VI & I of Scotland and England
Dukedom of Albany (3rd creation) merged in the Crown, 1567
Duke of Albany (4th creation), 1604; Duke of York (4th creation), 1605
Henry Frederick; 1594–1612	Elizabeth Stuart; 1596–1662	Prince Charles; 1600–1649; Duke of Albany, Duke of York; Later Charles I of Scotland and England
Dukedoms of York (4th creation) and Albany (4th creation) merged in the Crown, 1625
Duke of York (5th creation) 1644; Earl of Ulster (3rd Irish creation), 1659; Duke of Albany (5th creation), 1660
Sophia of Hanover; 1630–1714	Charles II of Scotland and England; 1630–1685	James Stuart; 1633–1701; Duke of York, Duke of Albany, Earl of Ulster; Later James II of Scotland and England
Dukedoms of Albany (5th creation) and York (5th creation), and Earldom of Ulster (3rd Irish creation) merged in the Crown, 1685
Duke of York and Albany (1st creation) and Earl of Ulster (4th Irish creation), 1716
George I of Great Britain; 1660–1727	Ernest Augustus; 1674–1728; Prince-Bishop of Osnabrück, Duke of York and Albany, Earl of Ulster
Dukedom of York and Albany (1st creation) and Earldom of Ulster (4th Irish creation) extinct, 1728
George II of Great Britain; 1683–1760
Prince Frederick Louis; 1707–1751; Duke of Gloucester, Duke of Edinburgh
Duke of York and Albany (2nd creation) and Earl of Ulster (5th Irish creation), 1760
George III of the United Kingdom; 1738–1820	Prince Edward; 1739–1767; Duke of York and Albany
Dukedom of York and Albany (2nd creation) and Earldom of Ulster (5th Irish creation) extinct, 1767
Duke of York and Albany (3rd creation) and Earl of Ulster (6th Irish creation), 1784	Earl of Inverness (1st creation), and Baron Arklow (1st creation), 1801
George IV of the United Kingdom; 1762–1830	Prince Frederick; 1763–1827; Duke of York and Albany	Prince Edward; 1767–1820; Duke of Kent and Strathearn	Prince Augustus Frederick; 1773–1843; Duke of Sussex, Earl of Inverness and Baron Arklow
Dukedom of York and Albany (3rd creation) and Earldom of Ulster (6th Irish creation) extinct, 1827	Earldom of Inverness and Barony Arklow extinct, 1843
Queen Victoria of the United Kingdom; 1819–1901
Earl of Ulster (1st UK creation), 1866	Duke of Albany (6th creation), Earl of Clarence, and Baron Arklow (2nd creation), 1881
Edward VII of the United Kingdom; 1841–1910	Prince Alfred Ernest Albert; 1844–1900; Duke of Edinburgh, Duke of Saxe-Coburg and Gotha, Earl of Ulster	Prince Leopold; 1853–1884; Duke of Saxe-Coburg and Gotha, 1st Duke of Albany, Earl of Clarence, and Baron Arklow
Earldom of Ulster (1st UK creation) extinct, 1900
Duke of York (6th creation), Earl of Inverness (2nd creation) and Baron Killarney (1st creation), 1892
Prince Albert Victor; 1864–1892; Duke of Clarence and Avondale	Prince George; 1865–1936; Duke of York, Earl of Inverness, and Baron Killarney; Later George V of the United Kingdom	Charles Edward; 1884–1954; Duke of Saxe-Coburg and Gotha, 2nd Duke of Albany, Earl of Clarence, and Baron Arklow
Dukedom of York (6th creation), Earldom of Inverness (2nd creation), Barony Killarney (1st creation) merged in the Crown, 1910	Dukedom of Albany (6th creation) forfeit, 1919
Duke of York (7th creation), Earl of Inverness (3rd creation) and Baron Killarney (2nd creation), 1920	Earl of Ulster (2nd UK creation), 1928
Edward VIII of the United Kingdom; 1894–1972; Duke of Windsor	Prince Albert; 1895–1952; Duke of York; Later George VI of the United Kingdom	Prince Henry; 1900–1974; Duke of Gloucester, 1st Earl of Ulster
Dukedom of York (7th creation), Earldom of Inverness (3rd creation), Barony Killarney (2nd creation) merged in the Crown, 1936
Elizabeth II of the United Kingdom; 1926–2022
Duke of York (8th creation), Earl of Inverness (4th creation) and Baron Killyleagh, 1986
Charles III of the United Kingdom b. 1948	Andrew Mountbatten-Windsor b. 1960; Duke of York, Earl of Inverness, and Baron Killyleagh	Prince Richard b. 1944; Duke of Gloucester, 2nd Earl of Ulster
Alexander Windsor b. 1974 styled Earl of Ulster
Heir apparent to the Earldom of Ulster

Family tree of British royal dukes

Includes dukes of: Albany, Albemarle, Bedford, Cambridge, Clarence, Connaught and Strathearn, Cumberland, Edinburgh, Gloucester, Gloucester and Edinburgh, Hereford, Kent, Kintyre and Lorne, Norfolk, Ross, Somerset, Sussex, Windsor, and York, but only when royally.

Non-royal dukes are not included; see Royal dukedoms in the United Kingdom.
Also not included are titles mandated for use by the heir apparent (Duke of Rothesay and the 1337 creation of the Duke of Cornwall), see Princes of Wales family tree.

King Robert II; 1316–1390	King Edward III; 1312–1377
Duke of Albany (1st creation), 1398	Duke of Clarence (1st creation), 1362	Duke of York (1st creation), 1385
King Robert III c. 1337–1406	Robert Stewart c. 1340–1420; 1st Duke of Albany	Edward the Black Prince; 1330–1376	Lionel of Antwerp; 1338–1368; Duke of Clarence	John of Gaunt; 1340–1399	Edmund; 1341–1402; 1st Duke of York
Dukedom of Clarence (1st creation) extinct, 1368
Duke of Cornwall (2nd creation), 1376	Duke of Hereford, 1397	Duke of Gloucester (1st creation), 1385
Murdoch Stewart c. 1362–1425; 2nd Duke of Albany	Richard of Bordeaux; 1367–1400; Duke of Cornwall, later King Richard II	Henry Bolingbroke; 1367–1413; Duke of Hereford, later King Henry IV	Thomas of Woodstock; 1355–1397; Duke of Gloucester
Dukedom of Albany (1st creation) forfeit, 1425	Dukedom of Cornwall (2nd creation) merged in the crown, 1377	Dukedom of Hereford merged in the crown, 1399	Dukedom of Gloucester (1st creation) extinct, 1397
Duke of Clarence (2nd creation), 1412	Duke of Bedford (1st & 2nd creations), 1414	Duke of Gloucester (2nd creation), 1414	Duke of Albemarle (Aumale) (1st creation), 1397
Thomas of Lancaster; 1387–1421; Duke of Clarence	John of Lancaster; 1389–1435; Duke of Bedford; Surrendered dukedom and then regranted, 1433	Humphrey of Lancaster; 1390–1447; Duke of Gloucester	John Beaufort; 1373–1410	Joan Beaufort c. 1379–1440	Edward of Norwich c. 1373–1415; Duke of Aumale, 2nd Duke of York	Richard of Conisburgh; 1385–1415
Dukedom of Clarence (2nd creation) extinct, 1421	Dukedom of Bedford (2nd creation) extinct, 1435	Dukedom of Gloucester (2nd creation) extinct, 1447	Dukedom of Albemarle (Aumale) (1st creation) forfeit, 1399
Duke of York (1st creation) restored, 1425; Duke of Cornwall (3rd creation), 1460
King James I 1394–1437	Joan Beaufort c. 1404–1445	Owen Tudor c. 1400–1461	John Beaufort; 1404–1444	Richard Neville; 1400–1460	Cecily Neville; 1415–1495	Richard of York; 1411–1460; 3rd Duke of York, Duke of Cornwall
Duke of Cornwall (3rd creation) extinct, 1460
Duke of Bedford (5th creation), 1485	Duke of Clarence (3rd creation), 1461	Duke of Gloucester (3rd creation), 1461
King James II; 1430–1460	Jasper Tudor c. 1431–1495; Duke of Bedford	Edmund Tudor c. 1430–1456	Lady Margaret Beaufort; 1443–1509	John Neville c. 1431–1471	Elizabeth Woodville c. 1437–1492	Edward; 1442–1483; 4th Duke of York, later King Edward IV	George Plantagenet; 1449–1478; Duke of Clarence	Richard of York; 1452–1485; Duke of Gloucester, later King Richard III
Dukedom of Bedford (5th creation) extinct, 1495	Dukedom of York (1st creation) merged in the Crown, 1461	Dukedom of Clarence (3rd creation) forfeit, 1478	Dukedom of Gloucester (3rd creation) merged in the Crown, 1483
Duke of Albany (2nd creation), 1458	Duke of Bedford (3rd creation), 1470	Duke of York (2nd creation), 1474; Duke of Norfolk (3rd creation), 1477	Duke of Bedford (4th creation), 1478
Alexander Stewart c. 1454–1485; 1st Duke of Albany	King James III; 1451/1452–1488	George Neville; 1457–1483; Duke of Bedford	King Henry VII; 1457–1509	Elizabeth of York; 1466–1503	Richard of Shrewsbury; 1473–1483; Duke of York, Duke of Norfolk	George of York; 1477–1479; Duke of Bedford
Dukedom of Bedford (3rd creation) forfeit, 1478	Dukedom of York (2nd creation) and Dukedom of Norfolk (3rd creation) extinct, 1483	Dukedom of Bedford (4th creation) extinct, 1479
Duke of Ross (1st creation), 1488	Duke of York (3rd creation), 1494	Duke of Somerset (3rd creation), 1499
John Stewart; 1482–1536; 2nd Duke of Albany	James Stewart; 1476–1504; Duke of Ross	King James IV; 1473–1513	Margaret Tudor; 1489–1541	Henry; 1491–1547; Duke of York, later King Henry VIII	Edmund Tudor; 1499–1500; Duke of Somerset (nominated but probably not invested)
Dukedom of Albany (2nd creation) extinct, 1536	Dukedom of Ross (1st creation) extinct, 1504	Dukedom of York (3rd creation) merged in the Crown, 1509	Dukedom of Somerset (3rd creation) extinct, 1500
Duke of Ross (2nd creation), 1514
King James V 1512–1542	Alexander Stewart; 1514–1515; Duke of Ross
Duke of Albany (3rd creation), 1565	Dukedom of Ross (2nd creation) extinct, 1515
Henry Stuart; 1546–1567; 1st Duke of Albany	Queen Mary; 1542–1587
James; 1566–1625; 2nd Duke of Albany, later King James VI & I
Dukedom of Albany (3rd creation) merged in the Crown, 1567
Duke of Albany (4th creation), 1604; Duke of York (4th creation), 1605	Duke of Kintyre and Lorne, 1602
Elizabeth Stuart; 1596–1662	Henry Frederick; 1594–1612	Charles; 1600–1649; Duke of Albany, Duke of York, later King Charles I	Robert Stuart; 1602; Duke of Kintyre and Lorne
Dukedom of Albany (4th creation), Dukedom of York (4th creation) merged in the Crown, 1625	Dukedom of Kintyre and Lorne extinct, 1602
Duke of York (5th creation) 1644; Duke of Albany (5th creation), 1660	Duke of Gloucester (4th creation), 1659
Sophia of Hanover; 1630–1714	James Stuart; 1633–1701; Duke of York, Duke of Albany, later King James VII & II	Henry; 1640–1660; Duke of Gloucester
Dukedom of Albany (5th creation) and Dukedom of York (5th creation) merged in the Crown, 1685	Dukedom of Gloucester (4th creation) extinct, 1660
Duke of York and Albany (1st creation), 1716	Duke of Cambridge (1st creation), 1664	Duke of Kendal (1st creation), 1666	Duke of Cambridge (2nd creation), 1667
King George I 1660–1727	Ernest Augustus; 1674–1728; Duke of York and Albany	Charles Stuart; 1660–1661 styled Duke of Cambridge	James Stuart; 1663–1667; Duke of Cambridge	Queen Anne; 1665–1714	Charles Stuart; 1666–1667 designated Duke of Kendal	Edgar Stuart; 1667–1671; Duke of Cambridge	Charles Stuart; 1677 styled Duke of Cambridge
Dukedom of York and Albany (1st creation) extinct, 1728	Dukedom of Cambridge (1st creation) extinct, 1667	Dukedom of Kendal (1st creation), extinct, 1667	Dukedom of Cambridge (2nd creation) extinct, 1671
Duke of Cambridge (3rd creation)
George; 1683–1760; Duke of Cambridge, later King George II	William; 1689–1700 styled Duke of Gloucester
Dukedom of Cambridge (3rd creation) merged with the Crown, 1727
Duke of Edinburgh (1st creation), 1726	Duke of Cumberland (3rd creation), 1726
Frederick; 1707–1751; 1st Duke of Edinburgh, styled Duke of Gloucester until created Duke of Edinburgh	William Augustus; 1721–1765; Duke of Cumberland
Dukedom of Cumberland (3rd creation) extinct, 1765
Duke of York and Albany (2nd creation), 1760	Duke of Gloucester and Edinburgh, 1764	Duke of Cumberland and Strathearn, 1766
George; 1738–1820; 2nd Duke of Edinburgh, later King George III	Edward; 1739–1767; Duke of York and Albany	William Henry; 1743–1805; 1st Duke of Gloucester and Edinburgh	Henry; 1745–1790; Duke of Cumberland and Strathearn
Dukedom of Edinburgh (1st creation), merged in the Crown, 1760	Dukedom of York and Albany (2nd creation) extinct, 1767	Dukedom of Cumberland and Strathearn extinct, 1790
Duke of York and Albany (3rd creation), 1784	Duke of Clarence and St Andrews, 1789	Duke of Kent and Strathearn, 1799	Duke of Cumberland and Teviotdale, 1799	Duke of Sussex (1st creation), 1801	Duke of Cambridge (4th creation), 1801
Frederick; 1763–1827; Duke of York and Albany	William Henry; 1765–1837, Duke of Clarence and St Andrews, later King William IV	Edward; 1767–1820; Duke of Kent and Strathearn	Ernest Augustus; 1771–1851; King of Hanover, 1st Duke of Cumberland and Teviotdale	Augustus Frederick; 1773–1843; Duke of Sussex	Adolphus; 1774–1850; 1st Duke of Cambridge	Mary; 1776–1857	William Frederick; 1776–1834; 2nd Duke of Gloucester and Edinburgh
Dukedom of York and Albany (3rd creation) extinct, 1827	Dukedom of Clarence and St Andrews merged in the Crown, 1830	Dukedom of Kent and Strathearn extinct, 1820	Dukedom of Sussex (1st creation) extinct, 1843	Dukedom of Gloucester and Edinburgh extinct, 1834
Queen Victoria; 1819–1901	George V 1819–1878; King of Hanover, 2nd Duke of Cumberland and Teviotdale	George; 1819–1904; 2nd Duke of Cambridge	Mary Adelaide; 1833–1897
Dukedom of Cambridge (4th creation) extinct, 1904
Duke of Edinburgh (2nd creation), 1866	Duke of Connaught and Strathearn, 1874	Duke of Albany (6th creation), 1881
King Edward VII; 1841–1910	Ernest Augustus; 1845–1923; 3rd Duke of Cumberland and Teviotdale	Alice; 1843–1878	Alfred Ernest Albert; 1844–1900; Duke of Edinburgh	Arthur; 1850–1942; 1st Duke of Connaught and Strathearn	Leopold; 1853–1884; 1st Duke of Albany
Dukedom of Cumberland and Teviotdale forfeit, 1919	Dukedom of Edinburgh (2nd creation) extinct, 1900
Duke of Clarence and Avondale, 1890	Duke of York (6th creation), 1892
Albert Victor; 1864–1892; Duke of Clarence and Avondale	George; 1865–1936; Duke of York, later King George V	Mary of Teck; 1867–1953	Victoria of Hesse and by Rhine; 1863–1950	Arthur of Connaught; 1883–1938
Dukedom of Clarence and Avondale extinct, 1892	Dukedom of York (6th creation) merged in the Crown, 1910
Duke of Windsor, 1937	Duke of York (7th creation), 1920	Duke of Kent (2nd creation), 1934	Duke of Gloucester (5th creation), 1928
King Edward VIII; 1894–1972; Later Duke of Windsor	Albert; 1895–1952; Duke of York, later King George VI	Alice of Battenberg; 1885–1969	George; 1902–1942; 1st Duke of Kent	Henry; 1900–1974; 1st Duke of Gloucester	Alastair Arthur; 1914–1943; 2nd Duke of Connaught and Strathearn	Charles Edward; 1884–1954; 2nd Duke of Albany
Dukedom of Windsor extinct, 1972	Dukedom of York (7th creation) merged in the Crown, 1936	Dukedom of Connaught and Strathearn extinct, 1943	Dukedom of Albany (6th creation) forfeit, 1919
Duke of Edinburgh (3rd creation), 1947
Queen Elizabeth II; 1926–2022	Philip; 1921–2021; 1st Duke of Edinburgh	Edward b. 1935; 2nd Duke of Kent
Duke of York (8th creation), 1986 (revoked 2025)	Duke of Edinburgh (4th creation), 2023
Charles b. 1948; 2nd Duke of Edinburgh, later King Charles III	Andrew b. 1960; Duke of York	Edward b. 1964; Duke of Edinburgh	George Windsor b. 1962	Richard b. 1944; 2nd Duke of Gloucester
Dukedom of Edinburgh (3rd creation) merged in the Crown, 2022	No male heirs	Dukedom of Edinburgh (4th creation) is a life peerage and therefore not hereditary	Heir apparent to the Dukedom of Kent
Duke of Cambridge (5th creation), 2011	Duke of Sussex (2nd creation), 2018
William b. 1982; Duke of Cambridge	Harry b. 1984; Duke of Sussex	Edward Windsor b. 1988	Alexander Windsor b. 1974
Heir-apparent to the Dukedom of Gloucester
George of Wales b. 2013	Archie of Sussex b. 2019
Heir apparent to the Dukedom of Cambridge	Heir apparent to the Dukedom of Sussex

== Dukes of Albany in fiction ==
- Thomas Norton and Thomas Sackville's play Gorboduc includes Fergus, the Duke of Albany, who tries to claim the British throne after Gorboduc's death through his royal descent.
- William Shakespeare's King Lear, set in no particular century, includes as a major character the Duke of Albany, who is husband to Lear's eldest daughter Goneril. In the aftermath of the royal family’s deaths, Albany offers to share power with the Earl of Kent and Edgar, son of the late Earl of Gloucester.
- In the 2001 film Kate & Leopold, Hugh Jackman plays "Leopold Mountbatten, Duke of Albany," who holds the title in 1876, making him a fictional analogue of Prince Leopold, Duke of Albany, who held the title at that time. However, the surname Mountbatten is an anachronism, as the equivalent family at the time would have been called Battenberg.

== See also ==
- Duchess of Albany
- Duke of York
- Duke of York and Albany
- Alba
- Albany (disambiguation)
