= Earl of Dublin =

Extinct earldom in the Peerage of the United Kingdom

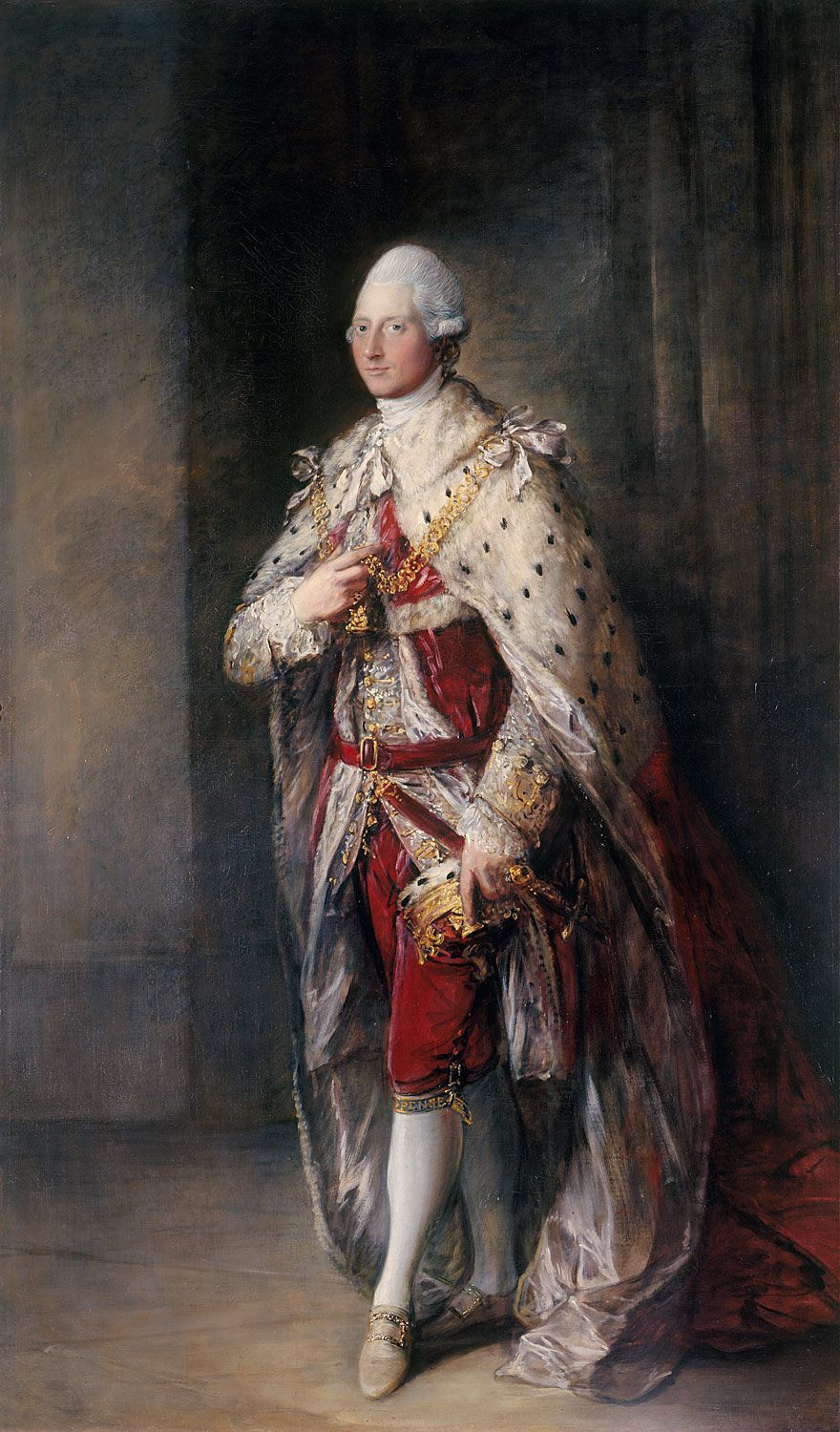
Portrait of Prince Henry, first Earl of Dublin

Earl of Dublin is a title that has been created three times in British and Irish history, for members of the British royal family.

It was created first on 22 October 1766 in the Peerage of Ireland for Prince Henry, Duke of Cumberland and Strathearn, younger brother of King George III. This title became extinct in 1790 upon the Duke's dying childless. It was created again on 24 April 1799, again in the Peerage of Ireland, for Prince Edward, Duke of Kent and Strathearn, fourth son of George III. This title became extinct upon his death without sons, in 1820. It was created a third time on 10 September 1849 (or according to some sources, 17 January 1850) in the Peerage of the United Kingdom for Albert Edward, Prince of Wales, eldest son of Queen Victoria.

== Earls of Dublin, first creation (1766) ==
- Prince Henry, 1st Earl of Dublin, Duke of Cumberland (1745–1790) (extinct)

== Earls of Dublin, second creation (1799) ==
- Prince Edward, 1st Earl of Dublin, Duke of Kent and Strathearn (1767–1820) (extinct)

== Earls of Dublin, third creation (1849/50) ==
- Prince Albert Edward, 1st Earl of Dublin, Prince of Wales (1849/50–1910) (merged with the Crown in 1901)

== Family tree ==
Family tree: Dukes of Kent, Marquesses of Kent, Earls of Kent, Dukes of Kent and Strathearn, and Dukes of Connaught and Strathearn

Earl of Kent (1st creation), 1020
Godwin, Earl of Wessex c. 1001–1053; 1st Earl of Kent	Herleva d. 1050
Earl of Kent (2nd creation), 1067
King Harold Godwinson c. 1022–1066	Leofwine Godwinson c. 1035–1066; 2nd Earl of Kent	King William I c. 1028–1087	Odo of Bayeux d. 1097; Earl of Kent
Earldom (1st creation) forfeit, 1066	Earldom (2nd creation) forfeit, 1088	Earl of Kent (3rd creation), 1141
William of Ypres c. 1090–1165; Earl of Kent
Earldom (3rd creation) forfeit, 1155	Earl of Kent (4th creation), 1227
Hubert de Burgh c. 1170–1243; Earl of Kent
King Edward I 1239–1307	Earldom (4th creation) extinct, 1243
King Edward II; 1284–1327
Earl of Kent (5th creation), 1321
King Edward III; 1312–1377	Edmund of Woodstock; 1301–1330; 1st Earl of Kent
Earldom (5th creation) attainted, 1330
Earldom (5th creation) restored, 1330	Baron Holand (2nd creation), 1353; Earl of Kent (6th creation), 1360
Edmund c. 1326–1331; 2nd Earl of Kent	John of Gaunt; 1340–1399; Duke of Lancaster	Edward the Black Prince; 1330–1376; Prince of Wales, Duke of Cornwall	Joan of Kent c. 1328–1385; Princess of Wales, 4th Countess of Kent suo jure, 5th Baroness Wake of Liddell	Thomas Holland c. 1314–1360; 1st Earl of Kent, 1st Baron Holland	John; 1330–1352; 3rd Earl of Kent, 4th Baron Wake of Liddell
Earldom (5th creation) extinct, 1360
Elizabeth of Lancaster bef. 1363–1426	John Holland c. 1352–1400; Earl of Huntingdon, Duke of Exeter, 3rd Baron Holland	Thomas Holland; 1350–1397; 2nd Earl of Kent, 2nd Baron Holland
Constance Holland; 1387–1437	Thomas Holland; 1372–1400; 3rd Earl of Kent; Duke of Surrey
Edmund Holland; 1383–1408; 4th Earl of Kent, 4th Baron Holand
Earl of Kent (7th creation), 1461	Earl of Kent (8th creation), 1465	Earldom (6th creation) extinct and Barony Holand (2nd creation) abeyant, 1408
William Neville c. 1405–1463; Earl of Kent, Baron Fauconberg jure uxoris	Edmund Grey; 1416–1490; 1st Earl of Kent, 4th Baron Grey de Ruthyn
Earldom (7th creation) extinct, 1463
Anne Woodville c. 1438–1489	George Grey c. 1460–1503; 2nd Earl of Kent, 5th Baron Grey de Ruthyn
Richard Grey; 1481–1524; 3rd Earl of Kent, 6th Baron Grey de Ruthyn	Anthony Grey	Henry Grey c. 1495–1562; 4th Earl of Kent, 7th Baron Grey de Ruthyn
George Grey	Henry Grey; 1520–1545
Anthony Grey; 1557–1643; 9th Earl of Kent	Reginald Grey d. 1573; 5th Earl of Kent, 8th Baron Grey de Ruthyn	Henry Grey; 1541–1615; 6th Earl of Kent, 9th Baron Grey de Ruthyn	Charles Grey c. 1545–1623; 7th Earl of Kent, 10th Baron Grey de Ruthyn
Henry Grey; 1594–1651; 10th Earl of Kent	Henry Grey c. 1583–1639; 8th Earl of Kent, 11th Baron Grey de Ruthyn
Anthony Grey; 1645–1702; 11th Earl of Kent
Marquess of Kent, Earl of Harold, and Viscount Goderich (1st creation), 1706; Duke of Kent (1st creation), 1710
Henry Grey; 1671–1740; Duke of Kent, Marquess of Kent, Marquess Grey, 12th Earl of Kent, Baron Lucas
Earldom (8th creation), Marquessate, and Dukedom of Kent, Earldom of Harold, and Viscountcy Goderich (1st creation) extinct, 1740
King George III; 1738–1820
Earl of Dublin (1st creation), 1766	Duke of Kent and Strathearn and Earl of Dublin (2nd creation), 1799	See also: Earl of Strathearn
Prince Henry Frederick; 1745–1790; Earl of Dublin	Prince Edward Augustus; 1767–1820; Duke of Kent and Strathearn
Earldom of Dublin (1st creation) extinct, 1790	Dukedom of Kent and Strathearn and Earldom of Dublin (2nd creation) extinct, 1820
Queen Victoria; 1819–1901
Earl of Dublin (3rd creation), 1849/1850	Earl of Kent (9th creation), 1866	Duke of Connaught and Strathearn, 1874
Albert Edward, Prince of Wales; 1841–1910; Earl of Dublin, later King Edward VII	Prince Alfred Ernest Albert; 1844–1900; Duke of Edinburgh, Duke of Saxe-Coburg and Gotha, Earl of Kent	Prince Arthur; 1850–1942; 1st Duke of Connaught and Strathearn
Earldom of Dublin merged in the Crown, 1901
King George V 1865–1936	Prince Arthur of Connaught; 1883–1938
Duke of Kent (2nd creation), Earl of St Andrews, and Baron Downpatrick, 1934
Prince George; 1902–1942; 1st Duke of Kent, 1st Earl of St Andrews, 1st Baron Downpatrick	Prince Alastair Arthur; 1914–1943; 2nd Duke of Connaught and Strathearn
Dukedom of Connaught and Strathearn extinct, 1943
Prince Edward b. 1935; 2nd Duke of Kent, 2nd Earl of St Andrews, 2nd Baron Downpatrick	7) Prince Michael of Kent b. 1942
1) George Philip Nicholas Windsor b. 1962 styled Earl of St Andrews and heir apparent to the dukedom of Kent	3) Nicholas Charles Edward Jonathan Windsor b. 1970	8) Frederick Michael George David Louis Windsor b. 1979
2) Edward Edmund Maximilian George Windsor b. 1988 styled Lord Downpatrick	4) Albert Louis Philip Edward Windsor b. 2007	5) Leopold Ernest Augustus Guelph Windsor b. 2009	6) Louis Arthur Nicholas Felix Windsor b. 2014

== See also ==
- Marquess of Dublin
- Kings of Dublin
- Lord Mayor of Dublin
