= List of earldoms =

Peerages and baronetcies of Britain and Ireland
| Extant | All |
|---|---|
| Dukes | Dukedoms |
| Marquesses | Marquessates |
| Earls | Earldoms |
| Viscounts | Viscountcies |
| Barons | Baronies |
| Baronets | Baronetcies |

This page lists all earldoms, extant, extinct, dormant, abeyant, or forfeit, in the peerages of England, Scotland, Great Britain, Ireland and the United Kingdom.

The Norman conquest of England introduced the continental Frankish title of "count" (comes) into England, which soon became identified with the previous titles of Danish "jarl" and Anglo-Saxon "earl" in England. Until the reign of Edward III in the 14th century, the peerage of England consisted exclusively of earls and barons.

It remains a matter of debate whether early Anglo-Norman counts/earls held their title by tenure (as barons did) or as a personal dignity conferred separately from the land grants. At least three types of early earldoms can be distinguished – (1) earls palatine (e.g. Chester, Pembroke, Durham) whose titles were connected to entire counties, with regal jurisdiction (jura regalia) and enjoying full privileges and fruits of royal seigniory, (2) earldoms created by the king and appointed to a county, but only enjoying right to a third of the profits of the pleas of the county court; (3) earldoms created by royal grants of large tracts of land to be held in feudal service (per servitum unius comitatus), erecting the tract to a county to support the earldom. Nonetheless, for the last few centuries of English history, earldoms have always been created by letters patent or charters, and the volume of earldoms has long exceeded the number of territorial counties, and, as a result, the names of many earldoms are associated with smaller units (estates, villages, families, etc.).

== Earldoms in England before 1066 ==
| English title | Creation | Surname | Current status | Notes |
|---|---|---|---|---|
| Northumbria (1st creation) | 1017 | Hlathir | Extinct 1023 | Recreated 1031, 1055, 1065, 1067, 1068, 1072, 1075, 1080, 1086, 1139, 1189 |
| East Anglia (1st creation) | 1017 | Thorkell | Forfeit 1021 | Recreated 1044, 1051, 1067 |
| Wessex (1st creation) | 1020 | Godwine | Extinct 1066 | Recreated 1999 |
| Kent (1st creation) | 1020 | Godwine | Extinct 1066 | Recreated 1067, 1141, 1227, 1321, 1360, 1461, 1465, 1866 |
| Mercia | 1030 | Leofric | Extinct 1071 | — |
| Northumbria (2nd creation) | 1031 | Siward | Extinct 1055 | Recreated 1055, 1065, 1067, 1068, 1072, 1075, 1080, 1086, 1139, 1189 |
| Hereford (1st creation) | 1043 | Godwine | Forfeit 1051 | Recreated 1052, 1058, 1067, 1141, 1199 |
| East Anglia (2nd creation) | 1044 | Godwine | Extinct 1066 | Forfeit 1051–1057; recreated 1051, 1067 |
| East Anglia (3rd creation) | 1051 | Leofric | Forfeit 1057 | Recreated 1067 |
| Hereford (2nd creation) | 1052 | de Mantes | Extinct 1057 | Recreated 1058, 1067, 1141, 1199 |
| Northumbria (3rd creation) | 1055 | Godwine | Extinct 1065 | Recreated 1065, 1067, 1068, 1072, 1075, 1080, 1086, 1139, 1189 |
| Hereford (3rd creation) | 1058 | Godwine | Extinct 1066 | Recreated 1067, 1141, 1199 |
| Huntingdon (1st creation) | 1065 | Waltheof | Extinct 1237 | Also Earl of Northampton; created Earl of Northumbria from 1139 to 1157; recreated 1337, 1377, 1388, 1471, 1529 |
| Northampton (1st creation) | 1065 | Waltheof | Extinct 1237 | Also Earl of Huntingdon; created Earl of Northumbria from 1139 to 1157; recreated 1337, 1604, 1618 |
| Northumbria (4th creation) | 1065 | Leofric | Forfeit 1067 | Recreated 1067, 1067, 1067, 1068, 1072, 1075, 1080, 1086, 1139, 1189 |

== Earldoms in the Peerage of England, 1066–1707 ==
| English title | Creation | Surname | Current status | Notes (currently extant abeyant) |
|---|---|---|---|---|
| East Anglia (4th creation) | 1067 | de Gael | Renamed 1070 | Renamed to Earl of Norfolk in 1070 |
| Hereford (4th creation) | 1067 | Fitzosbern | Forfeit 1074 | Recreated 1141, 1199 |
| Kent (2nd creation) | 1067 | Odo | Forfeit 1088 | Recreated 1141, 1227, 1321, 1360, 1461, 1465, 1866 |
| Northumbria (5th creation) | 1067 | Copsi | Extinct 1067 | Recreated 1067, 1068, 1072, 1075, 1080, 1086, 1139, 1189 |
| Northumbria (6th creation) | 1067 | Osulf | Extinct 1067 | Recreated 1067, 1068, 1072, 1075, 1080, 1086, 1139, 1189 |
| Northumbria (7th creation) | 1067 | Gospatric | Forfeit 1072 | Forfeit 1068–1070; recreated 1068, 1072, 1075, 1080, 1086, 1139, 1189 |
| Cornwall (1st creation) | 1068 | Moreton | Forfeit 1106 | Recreated 1140, 1141, 1180, 1189, 1217, 1225, 1307, 1330 |
| Northumbria (8th creation) | 1068 | de Comyn | Extinct 1069 | Recreated 1070, 1072, 1075, 1080, 1086, 1139, 1189 |
| Dorset (1st creation) | 1070 | Osmund | Extinct 1099 | Recreated 1411, 1441, 1603 |
| Norfolk (1st creation) | 1070 | de Gael | Forfeit 1074 | Recreated 1140, 1312, 1644 |
| Chester (1st creation) | 1070 | of Oosterzele | Forfeit 1071, by the first earl | Recreated 1071, 1121, 1232, 1253, 1264, 1850 |
| Chester (2nd creation) | 1071 | d'Avranches | Extinct 1120, on the death of the 2nd earl | Recreated 1121, 1232, 1253, 1264, 1850 |
| Northumbria (9th creation) | 1072 | Waltheof | Forfeit 1075 | Recreated 1075, 1080, 1086, 1139, 1189 |
| Shrewsbury (1st creation) | 1074 | de Montgomery | Forfeit 1102 | Recreated 1442 |
| Northumbria (10th creation) | 1075 | Walcher | Extinct 1080 | Also Bishop of Durham; recreated 1080, 1086, 1139, 1189 |
| Northumbria (11th creation) | 1080 | de Coucy | Resigned 1086 | Recreated 1086, 1139, 1189 |
| Albemarle | 1081 | de Blois, de Fortz | Extinct 1274, on the death of the 6th countess | — |
| Northumbria (12th creation) | 1086 | de Mowbray | Forfeit 1095 | Recreated 1139, 1189 |
| Surrey | 1088 | de Warenne | Extinct 1415 | — |
| Warwick | 1088 | de Newburgh | Forfeit 1499 | — |
| Gloucester | 1093 | Fitzeustace | Extinct 1094 | — |
| Buckingham | 1097 | de Giffard | Extinct 1164, on the death of the 2nd earl | — |
| Leicester | 1107 | Bellamont or Beaumont | Extinct 1204 | — |
| Chester (3rd creation) | 1121 | Meschin, Gernon, Kevelioc, Blondeville | Extinct 1232, on the death of the 4th earl of this creation | Recreated 1232, 1253, 1264, 1850 |
| Gloucester | 1121 | Fitzroy, Fitzrobert | Extinct 1183 | — |
| Richmond | 1136 | de Bretagne | Extinct 1203 | — |
| Arundel | 1138 | Aubigny, Fitzalan, Howard | Extant | Also Duke of Norfolk, Earl of Surrey and Earl of Norfolk from 1660 |
| Bedford | 1138 | Beaumont | Forfeit 1142, by the 1st earl | — |
| Derby | 1138 | Ferrers | Forfeit 1266 | — |
| Hertford | 1138 | de Clare | Extinct 1314 | — |
| Pembroke | 1138 | de Clare | Extinct 1185 | — |
| Worcester | 1138 | de Bellomont | Extinct 1145 | — |
| Essex | 1139 | de Mandeville | Extinct 1189 | — |
| Northumbria (13th creation) | 1139 | Dunkeld | Forfeit 1157 | Also Earl of Huntingdon; recreated 1189 |
| Cornwall (2nd creation) | 1140 | de Bretagne | Deprived 1141 | Recreated 1141, 1180, 1189, 1217, 1225, 1307, 1330 |
| Norfolk (2nd creation) | 1140 | Bigod | Extinct 1307 | Recreated 1312, 1644 |
| Cornwall (3rd creation) | 1141 | Dunstanville | Extinct 1175 | Recreated 1180, 1189, 1217, 1225, 1307, 1330 |
| Devon | 1141 | de Redvers | Forfeit 1471 | Also forfeit 1461–1470 |
| Hereford (5th creation) | 1141 | de Gloucester, Fitzmiles | Extinct 1155 | Recreated 1199 |
| Kent (3rd creation) | 1141 | Ipre | Forfeit 1155 | Recreated 1227, 1321, 1360, 1461, 1465, 1866 |
| Lincoln | 1141 | Aubigny | Exchanged for Arundel, 1143 | — |
| Oxford | 1141 | de Vere | dormant 1703 | Forfeit 1265, 1388–1393, 1475–1485 |
| Somerset | 1141 | de Mohun | Extinct 1155 | Granted by Empress Matilda, unconfirmed by subsequent monarchs, never used by descendants |
| Lincoln | 1143 | de Roumare | Extinct 1155 | — |
| Lincoln | 1147 | de Gant | Extinct 1156 | — |
| Salisbury | 1149 | de Salisbury | Forfeit 1322 | — |
| Buckingham | 1164 | de Clare | Extinct 1176, on the death of the first earl | Also Earl of Pembroke |
| Cornwall (4th creation) | 1180 | Baldwin | Extinct 1188 | Recreated 1189, 1217, 1225, 1307, 1330 |
| Cornwall (5th creation) | 1189 | Plantagenet | Merged in crown 1199 | Recreated 1217, 1225, 1307, 1330 |
| Northumbria (14th creation) | 1189 | de Puiset | Extinct 1195 | Also Bishop of Durham |
| Pembroke | 1189 | Marshall | Extant 1245 | — |
| Essex | 1199 | Fitzpiers | Extinct 1227 | — |
| Hereford | 1199 | de Bohun | Extinct 1373 | Lands and titles stolen by crown. |
| Leicester | 1206 | Montfort | Forfeit 1264 | — |
| Winchester | 1207 | Quincy | Extinct 1264 | — |
| Cornwall (6th creation) | 1217 | Fitz-Count | Resigned 1220 | Recreated 1225, 1307, 1330 |
| Lincoln | 1217 | de Blundeville | Extinct 1232 | Also Earl of Chester |
| Kent (4th creation) | 1226 | Burgh | Extinct 1243 | Recreated 1321, 1360, 1461, 1465, 1866 |
| Cornwall (7th creation) | 1226 | Plantagenet | Extinct 1300 | Recreated 1307, 1330 |
| Essex | 1227 | de Bohun | Extant 1372 | — |
| Lincoln | 1232 | Lacy, Plantagenet | Extinct 1348 | — |
| Chester (4th creation) | 1232 | of Scotland | Extinct 1237, on the death of the first earl of this creation | Recreated 1253, 1264, 1850 |
| Warwick | 1246 | Plessets | Extinct 1268 | — |
| Pembroke | 1247 | Valence | Extinct 1323 | — |
| Chester (5th creation) | 1254 | Plantagenet | Merged in the crown 1272 | Recreated 1264, 1850 |
| Chester (6th creation) | 1264 | de Montfort | Forfeit 1265 | Recreated 1850 |
| Lancaster | 1267 | Plantagenet | Forfeit 1321 | Restored 1327; created Duke of Lancaster in 1351 |
| Richmond | 1268 | de Dreux | Extinct 1399 | Forfeit 1342–1372 |
| Leicester | 1265 | Plantagenet | Extinct 1361 | — |
| Sussex | 1282 | Plantagenet | Extinct 1347 | — |
| Chester | 1284 | Plantagenet | Extinct 1284, on the death of the first earl of this creation | — |
| Arundel | 1289 | Fitzalan, Howard | Extant | Forfeit 1326–1331, 1397–1400, 1589–1604 |
| Gloucester, Earl of Hertford | 1299 | Monthermer | Extinct 1306 | — |
| Chester | 7 February 1301 | Plantagenet | Merged in crown 1307 | Also Prince of Wales |
| Cornwall | 6 August 1307 | de Graveston | Extinct 1312 | — |
| Norfolk | 16 December 1312 | Plantagenet | Extinct 1338 | — |
| Kent | 28 July 1321 | Plantagenet | Extinct 1385 | — |
| Carlisle | 25 March 1322 | Harclay | Forfeit 1323 | — |
| Winchester | 10 May 1322 | Despenser | Forfeit 1326 | — |
| March | 9 November 1328 | Mortimer, Plantagenet | Merged in crown 1461 | Forfeit 1330–1354; also Earl of Ulster in Ireland from 1382; also Duke of York and Earl of Cambridge from 1425 |
| Cornwall | 1 December 1330 | Plantagenet | Extinct 1336 | — |
| Salisbury | 13 March 1337 | Montacute | Forfeit 1400 | — |
| Derby | 16 March 1337 | Plantagenet | Extinct 1361 | Also Earl of Lancaster and Earl of Leicester; created Earl of Lincoln in 1349 and Duke of Lancaster in 1351 |
| Gloucester | 16 March 1337 | Despenser, Audley | Extinct 1347 | — |
| Huntingdon | 16 March 1337 | de Clinton, Clinton | Extinct 1354 | — |
| Northampton | 16 March 1337 | de Bohun | Extinct 1438 | Abeyant 1373–1384 |
| Suffolk | 16 March 1337 | Ufford | Extinct 1382 | — |
| Pembroke | 13 October 1339 | Hastings | Extinct 1391 | — |
| Cambridge | 7 May 1340 | de Juliers | Extinct 1361 | — |
| Richmond | 24 September 1341 | Montfort | Extinct 1345 | Also Duke of Brittany in France |
| Richmond | 26 September 1345 | Plantagenet | Surrendered peerage 1372 | Also Earl of Lancaster and Earl of Leicester from 1361; created Duke of Lancaster in 1362 |
| Lincoln | 20 August 1349 | Plantagenet | Extinct 1361 | Also Earl of Lancaster, Earl of Leicester, and Earl of Derby; created Duke of Lancaster in 1351 |
| Stafford | 3 March 1351 | Stafford | Forfeit 1521 | Created Duke of Buckingham in 1444; forfeit 1483–1486 |
| Kent | 20 November 1360 | Holland | Extinct 1408 | Created Duke of Surrey in 1397, which title forfeit 1400 |
| Cambridge | 13 November 1362 | Plantagenet | Resigned peerage 1414 | Created Duke of York in 1385 |
| Bedford | 11 May 1366 | de Coucy, Couci | Resigned 1377, by the first earl | — |
| Richmond | 20 June 1372 | Montfort | Extinct 1399 | Also Duke of Brittany in France |
| Norfolk | 1375 | Manny, Mowbray | Extinct 1481 | Created Duchess of Norfolk in 1397; that title extinct 1399; also Earl of Nottingham 1400–1476 and Duke of Norfolk 1397–1399, 1425–1476 |
| Essex | 1376 | Plantagenet | Forfeit 1397 | Created Earl of Buckingham in 1377, Duke of Gloucester and Aumale in 1385 |
| Buckingham | 13 July 1377 | Plantagenet | Extinct 1399, on the death of the 2nd earl | Created Duke of Gloucester in 1385; that title forfeit 1397 |
| Nottingham | 15 July 1377 | Mowbray | Extinct 1382 | — |
| Northumberland | 16 July 1377 | Percy | Forfeit 1537 | Also forfeit 1406–1414, 1461–1470 |
| Huntingdon | 16 July 1377 | Angle | Extinct 1380 | — |
| Nottingham | 2 February 1383 | Mowbray | Extinct 1475 | Created Duke of Norfolk 1397; the ducal title was not in use 1399–1425 |
| Suffolk | 6 August 1385 | de la Pole | Forfeit 1503 | Created Marquess of Suffolk in 1444 and Duke of Suffolk in 1448; those titles surrendered in 1493 |
| Derby | 3 September 1385 | Plantagenet | Merged in crown 1399 | Created Duke of Hereford in 1397; also Duke of Lancaster, Earl of Lancaster, and Earl of Leicester from 1399 |
| Huntingdon | 2 June 1387 | Holland | Forfeit 1461 | Created Duke of Exeter in 1397; both peerages forfeit 1400; restored 1417; again created Duke of Exeter in 1443 |
| Rutland | 25 February 1390 | Plantagenet | Extinct 1402 | Created Duke of Aumale in 1397, but deprived of the title in 1399; title was created only in the lifetime of his father; he became Duke of York and Earl of Cambridge at his father's death in 1402 |
| Somerset | 10 February 1397 | Beaufort | Forfeit 1463 | Created Marquess of Somerset in 1397, but deprived of the title in 1399; created Duke of Somerset in 1443; that title extinct 1444; also Marquess of Dorset and Earl of Dorset from 1444; created Duke of Somerset in 1448 |
| Gloucester | 29 September 1397 | Despenser | Deprived of peerage 1399 | — |
| Westmorland | 29 September 1397 | Neville | Forfeit 1570 | — |
| Wiltshire | 29 September 1397 | Scrope | Forfeit 1399 | — |
| Worcester | 29 September 1397 | Percy | Extinct 1404 | — |
| Dorset | 5 July 1411 | Beaufort | Extinct 1426 | Created Duke of Exeter in 1416 |
| Aumale | 9 July 1412 | Plantagenet | Extinct 1421 | Subsidiary title of the Duke of Clarence |
| Cambridge | 1 May 1414 | Plantagenet | Merged in crown 1461 | Attainted 1415–1426 |
| Kendal | 16 May 1414 | Plantagenet | Extinct 1435 | Subsidiary title of the Duke of Bedford created Earl of Richmond in 1414 |
| Pembroke | 16 May 1414 | Plantagenet | Extinct 1447 | Subsidiary title of the Duke of Gloucester |
| Richmond | 24 November 1414 | Plantagenet | Extinct 1435 | Also Duke of Bedford and Earl of Kendal |
| Worcester | February 1421 | Beauchamp | Extinct 1431 | — |
| Dorset | August 1441 | Beaufort | Forfeit 1463 | Created Marquess of Dorset in 1442 and Duke of Somerset in 1448 |
| Shrewsbury | 20 May 1442 | Talbot | Extant | Created Earl of Waterford in Ireland in 1446, also Earl Talbot in Great Britain from 1856. From 1694 to 1718 also Duke of Shrewsbury and Marquess of Alton. 2nd and last creation. |
| Salisbury | 1442 | Neville | Forfeit 1471 | Also Earl of Warwick from 1460 |
| Kendal | 28 August 1443 | Beaufort | Extinct 1444 | Subsidiary title of the Duke of Somerset; also Earl of Somerset |
| Kendal | 1446 | de Foix | Surrendered peerage 1462 | — |
| Wiltshire | 8 July 1449 | Butler | Extinct 1461 | — |
| Worcester | 16 July 1449 | Tiptoft | Forfeit 1485 | — |
| Warwick | 23 July 1449 | Neville | Forfeit 1471 | Also Earl of Salisbury from 1460 |
| Surrey | 24 March 1451 | Mowbray | Extinct 1475 | Also Duke of Norfolk from 1461 |
| Richmond | 6 March 1453 | Tudor | Forfeit 1461 | — |
| Pembroke | 6 March 1453 | Tudor | Extinct 1495 | Forfeit 1461–1485; created Duke of Bedford in 1485 |
| Essex | 30 June 1461 | Bourchier | Extinct 1539 | — |
| Kent | 30 June 1461 | Neville | Extinct 1463 | — |
| Kent | 20 May 1465 | Grey | Extinct 1740 | Created Marquess of Kent and Earl of Harold in 1706; created Duke of Kent in Great Britain in 1710 and Marquess Grey in Great Britain in 1740 |
| Rivers | 24 May 1466 | Widvile | Extinct 1491 | — |
| Lincoln | 13 March 1467 | de la Pole | Extinct 1487 | — |
| Northumberland | 13 March 1467 | Neville | Resigned 1470 | Afterwards created Marquess of Montagu |
| Pembroke | 8 September 1468 | Herbert | Resigned peerage 1479 | Afterwards created Earl of Huntingdon |
| Devon | 17 May 1469 | Stafford | Forfeit 1469 | — |
| Wiltshire | 5 January 1470 | Stafford | Extinct 1499 | — |
| Huntingdon | 14 August 1471 | Grey | Surrendered peerage 1475 | Afterwards created Marquess of Dorset |
| Salisbury | 25 March 1472 | Plantagenet | Forfeit 1478 | Also Duke of Clarence and Earl of Warwick 1472–1478; forfeit 1478–1485; restored as Earl of Warwick 1493; titles forfeit 1499–1513 |
| Warwick | 25 March 1472 | Plantagenet | Forfeit 1499 | Also Duke of Clarence and Earl of Salisbury 1472–1478; forfeit 1478–1493; also Earl of Salisbury 1493–1499 |
| Winchester | 13 October 1472 | Bruges | Resigned 1500 | — |
| Nottingham | 12 June 1476 | Plantagenet | Extinct 1483 | Also Duke of York and Duke of Norfolk |
| Salisbury | 15 February 1478 | Plantagenet | Extinct 1484 | Also Prince of Wales and Duke of Cornwall from 1483 |
| Huntingdon | 14 July 1479 | Herbert | Extinct 1491 | Previously Earl of Pembroke |
| March | 18 July 1479 | Plantagenet | Merged in crown 1483 | Also Prince of Wales, Duke of Cornwall, and Earl of Pembroke |
| Pembroke | 18 July 1479 | Plantagenet | Merged in crown 1483 | Also Prince of Wales, Duke of Cornwall, and Earl of March |
| Nottingham | 28 June 1483 | Berkeley | Extinct 1491 | Created Marquess of Berkeley in 1488 |
| Surrey | 28 June 1483 | Beaumont, Fitzalan-Howard | Extant | Forfeit 1485–1489; also Duke of Norfolk 1514–1572; forfeit 1572–1604; also Earl of Arundel from 1604 and Earl of Norfolk from 1644; restored as Duke of Norfolk 1660 |
| Devon | 26 October 1485 | Courtenay | Forfeit 1539 | Created Marquess of Exeter in 1525 |
| Derby | 27 October 1485 | Stanley | Extant | — |
| Bath | 6 January 1486 | de Chandée | Extinct after 1486, on the death of the first earl | — |
| Wiltshire | 27 January 1510 | Stafford | Extinct 1523 | — |
| Worcester | 1 February 1514 | Somerset | Extant | Created Marquess of Worcester in 1642 and Duke of Beaufort in 1682 |
| Cumberland | 18 June 1525 | Clifford | Extinct 1643 | — |
| Nottingham | 18 June 1525 | Fitzroy | Extinct 1536 | Subsidiary title of the Duke of Richmond and Somerset |
| Rutland | 18 June 1525 | Manners | Extant | Created Duke of Rutland and Marquess of Granby in 1703 |
| Lincoln | 18 June 1525 | Brandon | Extinct 1534 | — |
| Huntingdon | 8 December 1529 | Hastings | Extant | — 6th and last creation |
| Wiltshire | 8 December 1529 | Boleyn | Extinct 1538 | Created Ormonde in Ireland at the same time |
| Sussex | 8 December 1529 | Ratcliff | Extinct 1643 | — |
| Bath | 9 July 1536 | Bourchier | Extinct 1654, on the death of the 5th earl | — |
| Hertford | 18 October 1537 | Seymour | Forfeit 1551 | Created Duke of Somerset in 1547 |
| Southampton | 18 October 1537 | Fitzwilliam | Extinct 1543 | — |
| Bridgewater | 19 July 1538 | Daubeney | Extinct 1548, on the death of the first earl | — |
| Essex | 17 April 1540 | Cromwell | Forfeit 1540 | — |
| Essex | 23 December 1543 | Parr | Extinct 1571 | Created Marquess of Northampton in 1547; forfeit 1553–1559 |
| Southampton | 16 February 1547 | Wriothesley | Extinct 1667 | Also Earl of Chichester from 1653 |
| Warwick | 18 February 1547 | Dudley | Forfeit 1553 | Created Duke of Northumberland in 1551 |
| Bedford | 19 January 1550 | Russell | Extant | Created Duke of Bedford and Marquess of Tavistock in 1694 |
| Wiltshire | 19 January 1550 | Paulet | Extant | Created Marquess of Winchester in 1551, created Duke of Bolton in 1689, which title extinct 1794 |
| Pembroke | 11 October 1551 | Herbert | Extant | Also Earl of Montgomery from 1630 |
| Devon | 3 September 1553 | Courtenay | Extant | dormant between 1556 and 1831 |
| Northumberland | 1 May 1557 | Percy | Extinct 1670 | — |
| Hertford | 13 January 1559 | Seymour | Extinct 1750 | Created Marquess of Hertford 1641, which title extinct 1675. Restored to the Dukedom of Somerset in 1660 |
| Warwick | 26 December 1561 | Dudley | Extinct 1589 | — |
| Leicester | 29 September 1564 | Dudley | Extinct 1588 | — |
| Essex | 4 May 1572 | Devereux | Extinct 1646 | Peerage forfeit 1601–1604 |
| Lincoln | 4 May 1572 | de Clinton, Pelham-Clinton-Hope, Fiennes-Clinton | Extant | Also Duke of Newcastle-under-Lyme from 1768 until 1988 |
| Nottingham | 22 October 1596 | Howard | Extinct 1681 | — |
| Devonshire | 21 July 1603 | Blount | Extinct 1606 | — |
| Suffolk | 21 July 1603 | Howard | Extant | Also Earl of Bindon from 1709 until 1722 and Earl of Berkshire from 1745 |
| Dorset | 13 March 1604 | Sackville | Extinct 1843 | Also Earl of Middlesex from 1677; created Duke of Dorset in 1720 |
| Northampton | 13 March 1604 | Howard | Extinct 1614 | — |
| Exeter | 4 May 1605 | Cecil | Extant | Created Marquess of Exeter in the United Kingdom in 1801 |
| Montgomery | 4 May 1605 | Herbert | Extant | Also Earl of Pembroke from 1630 |
| Salisbury | 4 May 1605 | Cecil | Extant | Created Marquess of Salisbury in Great Britain in 1789 |
| Richmond | 6 October 1613 | Stuart | Extinct 1624 | Also Duke of Lennox, Earl of Lennox, and Earl of Darnley in Scotland; created Duke of Richmond and Earl of Newcastle-upon-Tyne in 1623 |
| Somerset | 3 November 1613 | Carr | Extinct 1645 | — |
| Buckingham | 5 January 1617 | Villiers | Extinct 1687, on the death of the 2nd earl | Created Marquess of Buckingham in 1618 and Duke of Buckingham and Earl of Coventry in 1623 |
| Bridgewater | 27 May 1617 | Egerton | Extinct 1829, on the death of the 8th earl | Created Duke of Bridgewater and Marquess of Brackley in Great Britain in 1720, which titles extinct 1803 |
| Buckingham (Countess) | 1 July 1618 | Villiers, on the death of the first countess | Extinct 1632 | Peerage for life only |
| Northampton | 2 August 1618 | Compton | Extant | Created Marquess of Northampton and Earl Compton in the United Kingdom in 1812 |
| Leicester | 2 August 1618 | Sydney | Extinct 1743 | — |
| Warwick | 2 August 1618 | Rich | Extinct 1759 | Also Earl of Holland from 1673 |
| Devonshire | 7 August 1618 | Cavendish | Extant | Created Duke of Devonshire and Marquess of Hartington in 1694, also Earl of Burlington in the United Kingdom from 1858 |
| March | 7 June 1619 | Stuart | Extinct 1672 | Also Duke of Lennox, Earl of Lennox and Earl of Darnley in Scotland from 1624; created Duke of Richmond in 1641 |
| Cambridge | 16 June 1619 | Hamilton | Extinct 1651 | Also Marquess of Hamilton and Arran in Scotland; created Duke of Hamilton, Marquess of Clydesdale, and Earl of Arran and Cambridge in Scotland in 1643; also Earl of Lanark in Scotland from 1649 |
| Holderness | 22 January 1621 | Ramsay | Extinct 1625 | — |
| Berkshire | 28 June 1621 | Norris | Extinct 1623, on the death of the first earl | — |
| Carlisle | 13 September 1622 | Hay | Extinct 1660, on the death of the 2nd earl | — |
| Denbigh | 14 September 1622 | Feilding | Extant | Also Earl of Desmond in Ireland from 1675 |
| Bristol | 15 September 1622 | Digby | Extinct 1698, on the death of the 3rd earl | — |
| Middlesex | 16 September 1622 | Cranfield | Extinct 1674 | — |
| Anglesey | 18 April 1623 | Villiers | Extinct 1661, on the death of the 2nd earl | — |
| Newcastle upon Tyne | 17 May 1623 | Stuart | Extinct 1624 | Subsidiary title of the Duke of Richmond; also Earl of Richmond in England and Duke of Lennox, Earl of Lennox, and Earl of Darnley in Scotland |
| Coventry | 18 May 1623 | Villiers | Extinct 1687 | Subsidiary title of the Duke of Buckingham; also Marquess of Buckingham and Earl of Buckingham |
| Holland | 24 September 1624 | Rich | Extinct 1759 | Also Earl of Warwick from 1673 |
| Clare | 2 November 1624 | Holles | Extinct 1711 | Created Duke of Newcastle-upon-Tyne and Marquess of Clare in 1694 |
| Bolingbroke | 28 December 1624 | St. John | Extinct 1711, on the death of the 3rd earl | — |
| Westmorland | 29 December 1624 | Fane | Extant | — |
| Cleveland | 5 February 1626 | Wentworth | Extinct 1667 | — |
| Danby | 5 February 1626 | Danvers | Extinct 1644 | — |
| Manchester | 5 February 1626 | Montagu | Extant | Created Duke of Manchester in Great Britain in 1719 |
| Marlborough | 5 February 1626 | Ley | Extinct 1679 | — |
| Mulgrave | 5 February 1626 | Sheffield | Extinct 1735 | Created Marquess of Normanby in 1694 and Duke of Buckingham and Normanby in 1703 |
| Totness | 5 February 1626 | Carew | Extinct 1629 | — |
| Berkshire | 7 February 1626 | Howard | Extant | Also Earl of Suffolk from 1745 |
| Monmouth | 7 February 1626 | Carey | Extinct 1661 | — |
| Banbury | 18 August 1626 | Knollys | Extinct 1632, on the death of the first earl | — |
| Norwich | 24 October 1626 | Denny | Extinct 1630 | — |
| Rivers | 4 November 1626 | Savage | Extinct 1728 | — |
| Lindsey | 22 November 1626 | Bertie | Extant | Created Marquess of Lindsey in 1706 and Duke of Ancaster and Kesteven in Great Britain in 1715, which titles extinct 1809, also Earl of Abingdon from 1938 |
| Sunderland | 19 June 1627 | Scrope | Extinct 1630 | — |
| Earl of Newcastle-upon-Tyne | 7 March 1628 | Cavendish | Extinct 1691 | Created Marquess of Newcastle-upon-Tyne in 1643 and Duke of Newcastle-upon-Tyne and Earl of Ogle in 1664 |
| Dover | 8 March 1628 | Carey | Extinct 1677 | — |
| Peterborough | 9 March 1628 | Mordaunt | Extinct 1814 | Also Earl of Monmouth from 1697 |
| Stamford | 26 March 1628 | Grey | Extinct 1976 | — |
| Winchilsea | 11 July 1628 | Finch | Extant | Also Nottingham from 1729 |
| Earl of Kingston-upon-Hull | 25 July 1628 | Pierrepont | Extinct 1773 | Created Marquess of Dorchester in 1645; that title extinct 1680; created Marquess of Dorchester in 1706 and Duke of Kingston-upon-Hull in 1715 |
| Carnarvon | 2 August 1628 | Dormer | Extinct 1709, on the death of the 2nd earl | — |
| Newport | 3 August 1628 | Blount | Extinct 1681 | — |
| Chesterfield | 4 August 1628 | Scudamore-Stanhope | Extinct 1967 | — |
| Thanet | 5 August 1628 | Tufton | Extinct 1849 | — |
| St Albans | 23 August 1628 | Burgh | Extinct 1659 | — |
| Portland | 17 February 1633 | Weston | Extinct 1688 | — |
| Strafford | 12 January 1640 | Wentworth | Extinct 1695 | Peerage forfeit 1641–1662; also Earl of Strafford (1641) from 1662 |
| Rivers (Countess) | 21 April 1641 | Savage | Extinct 1651 | Peerage for life only |
| Strafford | 1 December 1641 | Wentworth | Extinct 1695 | — |
| Sunderland | 8 June 1643 | Spencer | Extant | Also Duke of Marlborough, Marquess of Blandford and Earl of Marlborough from 1733 |
| Holderness | 24 January 1644 | Wittelsbach | Extinct 1682 | Subsidiary title of the Duke of Cumberland |
| Sussex | 25 May 1644 | Savile | Extinct 1671 | — |
| Brentford | 27 May 1644 | Ruthven, Ruthyn | Extinct 1651, on the death of the 1st earl | Also Earl of Forth in the Peerage of Scotland |
| Chichester | 3 June 1644 | Leigh, Wriothesley | Extinct 1667 | Also Earl of Southampton from 1653 |
| Norfolk | 6 June 1644 | Beaumont, Fitzalan-Howard | Extant | Also Duke of Norfolk, Earl of Arundel and Earl of Surrey from 1660. 4th and last creation |
| Norwich | 28 November 1644 | Goring | Extinct 1672 | — |
| Glamorgan | 1644 | Somerset | Extant? | Title possibly never actually created, but has been claimed as a subsidiary title by the Marquesses of Worcester and Dukes of Beaufort |
| Scarsdale | 11 November 1645 | Leke | Extinct 1736 | — |
| Lichfield | 10 December 1645 | Stuart | Extinct 1672 | — |
| Rochester | 13 December 1652 | Wilmot | Extinct 1681 | — |
| Cambridge | 13 May 1659 | Stuart | Extinct 1660 | Subsidiary title of the Duke of Gloucester |
| St Albans | 27 April 1660 | Jermyn | Extinct 1683 | — |
| Chesterfield (Countess) | 29 May 1660 | Stanhope | Extinct 1667 | Peerage for life only |
| Torrington | 7 July 1660 | Monck | Extinct 1688 | Subsidiary title of the Duke of Albemarle |
| Sandwich | 12 July 1660 | Montagu | Extant | — |
| Guilford (Countess) | 14 July 1660 | Boyle | Extinct 1667 | Peerage for life only |
| Brecknock | 20 July 1660 | Butler | Forfeit 1715 | Also Marquess of Ormonde in Ireland, created Duke of Ormonde in Ireland in 1661 and Duke of Ormonde in 1682 |
| Anglesey | 20 April 1661 | Annesley | Extinct 1761, on the death of the 6th earl | — |
| Bath | 20 April 1661 | Granville | Extinct 1711, on the death of the 3rd earl | — |
| Cardigan | 20 April 1661 | Brudenell | Extant | Also Marquess of Ailesbury and Earl Bruce in the United Kingdom and Earl of Ailesbury in Great Britain from 1868 |
| Clarendon | 20 April 1661 | Hyde | Extinct 1753 | — |
| Essex | 20 April 1661 | Capel | Extant | Dormant 1981–1989 |
| Carlisle | 30 April 1661 | Howard | Extant | — |
| Doncaster | 14 February 1663 | Scott | Extant | Subsidiary title of the Duke of Monmouth, created Duke of Buccleuch and Earl of Dalkeith in Scotland in 1663, forfeit from 1685 to 1743, also Duke of Buccleuch and Earl of Dalkeith in Scotland from 1743, also Duke of Queensberry, Marquess of Dumfriesshire and Earl of Drumlanrig and Sanquhar in Scotland from 1810 |
| Craven | 16 March 1664 | Craven | Extinct 1697 | — |
| Falmouth | 17 March 1664 | Berkeley | Extinct 1665 | — |
| Ailesbury | 18 March 1664 | Bruce | Extinct 1747, on the death of the 3rd Earl | Also Earl of Elgin in Scotland |
| Burlington | 20 March 1664 | Boyle | Extinct 1753 | — |
| Cambridge | 23 August 1664 | Stuart | Extinct 1667 | — |
| Ogle | 16 March 1665 | Cavendish | Extinct 1691 | Subsidiary title of the Duke of Newcastle-upon-Tyne, also Marquess of Newcastle-upon-Tyne and Newcastle-upon-Tyne |
| Kendal | 1666 | Stuart | Extinct 22 May 1667 | Also Duke of Kendal from 1666 |
| Southampton | 3 August 1670 | Fitzroy, Villiers | Extinct 1774 | Subsidiary title of the Duke of Cleveland, also Duke of Southampton and Earl of Chichester from 1709 |
| Arlington | 22 April 1672 | Bennet, Fitzroy | Abeyant 1936, on the death of the 10th earl | Also Duke of Grafton and Earl of Euston from 1757 |
| Shaftesbury | 23 April 1672 | Ashley-Cooper | Extant | — |
| Euston | 16 August 1672 | Fitzroy | Extant | Created Duke of Grafton in 1675, also Earl of Arlington from 1757 until 1936 |
| Norwich | 19 October 1672 | Howard | Extinct 1777 | Also Duke of Norfolk from 1677 |
| Fareham (Countess) | 19 August 1673 | Penancoet de Kerouaille | Extinct 1734 | Subsidiary title of the Duchess of Portsmouth, peerage for life only |
| Powis | 4 April 1674 | Herbert | Extinct 1748 | Created Marquess of Powis in 1687 |
| Lichfield | 5 June 1674 | Lee | Extinct 1776 | — |
| Guilford | 25 June 1674 | Maitland | Extinct 1682 | Subsidiary title of the Duke of Lauderdale |
| Danby | 27 June 1674 | Osborne | Extinct 1964 | Created Marquess of Carmarthen in 1689 and Duke of Leeds in 1694 |
| Northumberland | 1 October 1674 | Fitzroy | Extinct 1716 | Created Duke of Northumberland in 1683 |
| Sussex | 5 October 1674 | Lennard | Extinct 1715 | — |
| Middlesex | 4 April 1675 | Sackville | Extinct 1843 | Also Earl of Dorset from 1677; created Duke of Dorset in 1720 |
| Plymouth | 28 July 1675 | Fitzcharles | Extinct 1680 | — |
| March | 9 August 1675 | Gordon-Lennox | Extant | Subsidiary title of the Duke of Richmond, created Duke of Lennox and Earl of Darnley in Scotland at the same time, created Duke of Gordon and Earl of Kinrara in the United Kingdom in 1876 |
| Chichester | 10 September 1675 | Fitzroy | Extinct 1774 | Subsidiary title of the Duke of Southampton, also Duke of Cleveland and Earl of Southampton from 1709 |
| Feversham | 8 April 1676 | Duras, Sondes | Extinct 1709 | — |
| Burford | 27 December 1676 | Beauclerk | Extant | Created Duke of St Albans in 1684 |
| Conway | 23 April 1679 | Conway | Extinct 1683 | — |
| Halifax | 16 July 1679 | Savile | Extinct 1700 | Created Marquess of Halifax in 1682 |
| Radnor | 23 July 1679 | Robartes | Extinct 1757 | — |
| Macclesfield | 23 July 1679 | Gerard | Extinct 1702 | — |
| Yarmouth | 30 July 1679 | Paston | Extinct 1732 | — |
| Berkeley | 11 September 1679 | Berkeley | Extinct 1942, on the death of the 8th earl | — |
| Sheppy (Countess) | 6 September 1680 | Walter | Extinct 1686 | Peerage for life only |
| Nottingham | 12 May 1681 | Finch | Extant | Also Winchilsea from 1729 |
| Rochester | 29 November 1682 | Hyde | Extinct 1753 | Also Earl of Clarendon from 1723 |
| Abingdon | 30 November 1682 | Bertie | Extant | Also Earl of Lindsey from 1938 |
| Gainsborough | 1 December 1682 | Noel | Extinct 1798 | — |
| Plymouth | 6 December 1682 | Windsor | Extinct 1843 | — |
| Holderness | December 1682 | D'Arcy | Extinct 1778 | — |
| Dorchester (Countess) | 20 January 1686 | Sedley | Extinct 1717 | Peerage for life only |
| Tinmouth | 19 March 1687 | Fitzjames | Forfeit 1695 | Subsidiary title of the Duke of Berwick-upon-Tweed |
| Derwentwater | 7 March 1688 | Radcliffe | Forfeit 1716 | — |
| Stafford (Countess) | 5 October 1688 | Stafford | Extinct 1694 | Peerage for life only |
| Stafford | 5 October 1688 | Howard | Extinct 1762 | — |
| Fauconberg | 9 April 1689 | Belasyse | Extinct 1700 | Also Viscount Fauconberg. |
| Kendal | 9 April 1689 | Oldenburg | Extinct 1708 | Subsidiary title of the Duke of Cumberland |
| Marlborough | 9 April 1689 | Churchill, Spencer, Spencer-Churchill | Extant | Created Duke of Marlborough and Marquess of Blandford in 1702, also Earl of Sunderland from 1733 |
| Montagu | 9 April 1689 | Montagu | Extinct 1749 | Created Duke of Montagu in 1705 |
| Portland | 9 April 1689 | Cavendish-Bentinck | Extant | Created Duke of Portland and Marquess of Titchfield in Great Britain in 1716, which titles extinct 1990 |
| Monmouth | 9 April 1689 | Mordaunt | Extinct 1814 | Also Earl of Peterborough from 1697 |
| Brentford | 10 April 1689 | Schomberg | Extinct 1719 | Subsidiary title of the Duke of Schomberg, created Marquess of Harwich at the same time, created Duke of Leinster and Earl of Bangor in Ireland in 1691 |
| Torrington | 29 May 1689 | Herbert | Extinct 1716 | — |
| Warrington | 7 April 1690 | Booth | Extinct 1758 | — |
| Scarbrough | 15 April 1690 | Lumley | Extant | — |
| Bradford | 11 May 1694 | Newport | Extinct 1762, on the death of the 4th earl | — |
| Romney | 14 May 1694 | Sydney | Extinct 1704 | — |
| Rochford | 10 May 1695 | Nassau van Zuylestein | Extinct 1830 | — |
| Tankerville | 11 June 1695 | Grey | Extinct 1701 | — |
| Albemarle | 10 February 1697 | Keppel | Extant | — |
| Coventry | 26 April 1697 | Coventry | Extant | — |
| Orford | 7 May 1697 | Russell | Extinct 1727 | — |
| Jersey | 13 October 1697 | Child-Villiers | Extant | — |
| Grantham | 24 December 1698 | de Nassau, Nassau, de Auverquerque | Extinct 1754 | — |
| Greenwich | 26 November 1705 | Campbell | Extinct 1743 | Subsidiary title of the Duke of Argyll |
| Milford Haven | 9 November 1706 | Guelph | Extinct 1727 | Subsidiary title of the Duke of Cambridge, created Marquess of Cambridge at the same time |
| Harold | 14 November 1706 | Grey | Extinct 1740 | Subsidiary title of the Marquess of Kent, also Earl of Kent, created Duke of Kent in Great Britain in 1710 and Marquess Grey in Great Britain in 1740 |
| Wharton | 23 December 1706 | Wharton | Extinct 1731 | Created the Marquess of Catherlough, Marquess of Wharton and Marquess of Malmesbury in 1715; created the Duke of Wharton in 1718 |
| Poulett | 24 December 1706 | Poulett | Extinct 1973 | — |
| Godolphin | 26 December 1706 | Godolphin | Extinct 1766 | — |
| Cholmondeley | 29 December 1706 | Cholmondeley | Extant | Created Marquess of Cholmondeley and Earl of Rocksavage in the United Kingdom in 1815 |
| Bindon | 30 December 1706 | Howard | Extinct 1722, on the death of the 2nd earl | Also Earl of Suffolk from 1709 |

== Earldoms in the Peerage of Scotland, 1072–1707 ==
| Scottish title | Creation | Surname | Current status | Notes (currently extant) |
|---|---|---|---|---|
| Dunbar | 1072 | de Dunbar | Forfeit 1435 | Mormaer |
| Fife | 1107 | unknown | Extinct 1120 | Mormaer |
| Angus | 1115 | Gilchrist, Umfraville | Extinct 1381 | Mormaer |
| Atholl | 1115 | Strathbogie | Extinct 1314 | Mormaer |
| Stratherne | 1115 | Malise | Forfeit 1332 | Mormaer |
| Fife | 1120 | unknown | Extinct 1128 | Mormaer |
| Fife | 1129 | Macduff, Stewart | Forfeit 1425 | Mormaer |
| Ross | 1157 | MacHeth | Extinct 1163 | Mormaer |
| Menteith | bef. 1164 | Menteith, Stewart | Extinct 1425 | Mormaer |
| Lennox | 1184 | Mcarkill | Extinct 1459 | Mormaer |
| Carrick | 1186 | Bruce | Extinct 1306 | Mormaer |
| Ross | 1215 | MacTaggart, de Ross, Leslie, Macdonald | Surrendered 1476 | Mormaer |
| Buchan | 1221 | Comyn | Forfeit 1320 | Mormaer |
| Sutherland | 1230 | de Moravia/Sutherland, Gordon, Sutherland, Leveson-Gower, Sutherland (Janson) | Extant | Mormaer – also Duke of Sutherland and Marquess of Stafford in the United Kingdom and Earl Gower in Great Britain from 1839 until 1963 |
| Atholl | 1314 | Campbell | Resigned 1333 | — |
| Carrick | 1314 | Bruce | Extinct 1371 | — |
| Moray | 1314 | Randolph, Dunbar, Stuart | Forfeit 1455 | — |
| Angus | 1330 | Stewart | Resigned 1389 | — |
| Caithness | 1334 | Strathearn | Forfeit 1335 | — |
| Atholl | 1341 | Douglas | Extinct 1371 | — |
| Wigtown | 9 November 1341 | Fleming | Surrendered title 1372 | — |
| Strathearn | 1343 | Moray | Resigned 1346 | — |
| Douglas | 1358 | Douglas | Forfeit 1456 | — |
| Strathearn | 1358 | Stewart | Forfeit 1437 | — |
| Moray | 1359 | Plantagenet | Extinct 1361 | — |
| Carrick | 1361 | Cunynghame | Extinct 1363 | — |
| Buchan | 1374 | Stewart | Extinct 1425 | — |
| Caithness | 1375 | Stewart | Forfeit 1437 | — |
| Angus | 1389 | Douglas | Extant | Created Marquess of Douglas in 1633; created Duke of Douglas in 1703, which title extinct in 1761; also Duke of Hamilton from 1761 |
| Carrick | 1390 | Stewart | Extinct | — |
| Crawford | 1398 | Lindsay | Extant | Also Earl of Lindsay 1652–1808; dormant 1808–1848; also Earl of Balcarres from 1848 |
| Carrick | 1398 | Stewart | Extant | — |
| Mar | 1404 | Mar, Erskine, Goodeve Erskine, Mar | Extant | Forfeit 1716–1824; also Earl of Kellie 1829–1866; dormant 1866–1885 |
| Menteith | 6 September 1427 | Graham | Extinct or dormant 1694 | — |
| Strathearn | 1427 | Graham | Extinct 1427 | — |
| Avondale | 1437 | Douglas | Forfeit 1456 | — |
| Huntly | 1445 | Gordon | Extant | Created Marquess of Huntly and Earl of Enzie in 1599, created Duke of Gordon in 1684, which title extinct 1836, created Earl of Norwich in Great Britain in 1784, which title extinct 1836, also Earl of Aboyne from 1836 |
| Ormond | 1445 | Douglas | Forfeit 1455 | — |
| Caithness | 1452 | Crichton | Extinct 1455 | — |
| Erroll | 1453 | Hay | Extant | — |
| Caithness | 1455 | Sinclair | Extant | — |
| Argyll | 1457 | Campbell | Extant | Created Duke of Argyll, Marquess of Kintyre and Lorne and Earl of Campbell and Cowall in 1701, also Earl of Ilay from 1743 until 1761, created Duke of Argyll in the United Kingdom in 1892 |
| Atholl | 1457 | Stewart | Resigned 1595 | — |
| Morton | 1458 | Douglas | Extant | — |
| Rothes | 1458 | Leslie | Extant | — |
| Marischal | 1458 | Keith | Forfeit 1715 | — |
| Mar and Garioch | 1459 | Stewart | Extinct 1479 | — |
| Arran | 1467 | Boyd | Forfeit 1469 | — |
| Buchan | 1469 | Stewart, Erskine | Extant | — |
| Ross | 1481 | Stewart | Extinct 1504 | Created Duke of Ross in 1488. |
| Mar and Garioch | 1483 | Stewart | Forfeit 1483 | Also Duke of Albany |
| Mar and Garioch | 1486 | Stewart | Extinct 1503 | — |
| Glencairn | 1488 | Cunynghame | dormant 1796 | — |
| Bothwell | 1488 | Hepburn | Forfeit 1567 | Created Duke of Orkney and Marquess of Fife in 1567 |
| Ardmenach | 1488 | Stewart | Extinct 1504 | Subsidiary title of the Duke of Ross, created Marquess of Ormonde at the same time |
| Lennox | 1488 | Stewart | Merged in Crown 1571 | — |
| Moray | 1501 | Stewart | Extinct 1544 | — |
| Arran | 11 August 1503 | Hamilton | dormant | —peerage earldom dormant, territorial earldom extant |
| Montrose | 3 March 1505 | Graham | Extant | Created Marquess of Montrose in 1644 and Duke of Montrose, Marquess of Graham and Buchanan and Earl of Kincardine in 1707, also Earl Graham of Belford in Great Britain from 1742 |
| Eglinton | January 1507 | Montgomerie | Extant | Created Earl of Winton in the United Kingdom in 1859 |
| Cassillis | 1509 | Kennedy | Extant | Created Marquess of Ailsa in the United Kingdom in 1831 |
| Moray | 30 January 1562 | Stuart | Extant | — |
| Ross | 15 May 1565 | Stuart | Merged in crown 1567 | Subsidiary title of the Duke of Albany |
| Mar | 24 June 1565 | Erskine | Extant | Forfeit 1716–1824; also Earl of Kellie 1829–1866 and since 1875 |
| Lennox | 18 April 1572 | Stewart | Extinct 1576 | — |
| Lennox | 16 June 1578 | Stewart | Surrendered peerage 1580 | — |
| Lennox | 5 March 1580 | Stewart | Extinct 1672 | Created Earl of Darnley and Duke of Lennox in 1581 |
| March | 5 March 1580 | Stewart | Extinct 1672 | — |
| Morton | 5 June 1581 | Maxwell | Returned 1586 | — |
| Bothwell | 16 June 1581 | Stewart | Forfeit 1624 | — |
| Darnley | 5 August 1581 | Stewart | Extinct 1672 | Subsidiary title of the Duke of Lennox |
| Gowrie | 23 August 1581 | Ruthven | Forfeit 1600 | — |
| Arran | 28 October 1581 | Stewart | Returned 1585 | See Lord Ochiltree |
| Orkney | 28 October 1581 | Stewart | Forfeit 1614 | — |
| Atholl | 6 March 1596 | Stewart | Resigned 1625 | — |
| Arran | 17 April 1599 | Hamilton | dormant 1651 | Subsidiary title of the Marquess of Hamilton |
| Enzie | 17 April 1599 | Gordon | Extant | Subsidiary title of the Marquess of Huntly, also Earl of Huntly, created Duke of Gordon in 1684, which title extinct 1836, created Earl of Norwich in Great Britain in 1784, which title extinct 1836, also Earl of Aboyne from 1836 |
| Linlithgow | 15 November 1600 | Livingston | Forfeit 1716 | — |
| Wintoun | 16 November 1600 | Seton | Forfeit 1716 | — |
| Ross | 23 December 1600 | Stewart | Merged in crown 1625 | Subsidiary title of the Duke of Albany |
| Home | 4 March 1605 | Douglas-Home | Extant | — |
| Perth | 4 March 1605 | Drummond | Extant | Forfeit 1716–1853, also Earl of Melfort 1853–1902 |
| Dunfermline | 4 March 1605 | Seton | Forfeit 1690 | — |
| Dunbar | 3 July 1605 | Home | dormant 1611 | — |
| Wigtown | 19 March 1606 | Fleming | Extinct or dormant 1747 | — |
| Abercorn | 10 July 1606 | Hamilton | Extant | Created Marquess of Abercorn in Great Britain in 1790 and Duke of Abercorn in Ireland and Marquess of Hamilton in the United Kingdom in 1868 |
| Strathmore and Kinghorne | 10 July 1606 | Lyon | Extant | Originally designated Earl of Kinghorne; designation changed to Earl of Strathmore and Kinghorne in 1677; created Earl of Strathmore and Kinghorne in the United Kingdom in 1937 |
| Earl of Lothian | 10 July 1606 | Kerr | Extant | Created Earl of Lothian in 1631, also Earl of Ancram from 1690, created Marquess of Lothian in 1701 |
| Tullibardine | 10 July 1606 | Murray | Extinct 1670 | — |
| Roxburghe | 18 September 1616 | Ker | Extant | Created Duke of Roxburghe, Marquess of Bowmont and Cessford and Earl of Kelso in 1707, also Earl Ker in Great Britain from 1741 until 1804, created Earl Innes in the United Kingdom in 1837 |
| Kellie | 12 March 1619 | Erskine | Extant | Also Earl of Mar 1829–1866 and since 1875 |
| Buccleuch | 16 March 1619 | Scott | Extant | Created Duke of Buccleuch and Earl of Dalkeith in 1663, also Earl of Doncaster in England from 1743 and Duke of Queensberry, Marquess of Dumfriesshire and Earl of Drumlanrig and Sanquhar from 1810 |
| Haddington | 20 March 1619 | Hamilton, Baillie-Hamilton | Extant | Originally created as Earl of Melrose; designation changed to Earl of Haddington in 1627 |
| Nithsdale | 20 August 1620 | Maxwell | Forfeit 1716 | — |
| Galloway | 19 September 1623 | Stewart | Extant | — |
| Seaforth | 3 December 1623 | Mackenzie | Forfeit 1716 | — |
| Lauderdale | 14 March 1624 | Maitland | Extant | Created Duke of Lauderdale in 1672; that title extinct 1682 |
| Annandale | 13 March 1625 | Murray | Extinct 1658 | — |
| Tullibardine | 30 January 1628 | Murray | Extant | Created Marquess of Atholl and Earl of Tullibardine in 1676 and Duke of Atholl, Marquess of Tullibardine and Earl of Strathtay and Strathardle in 1703 |
| Carrick | 22 July 1628 | Stewart | Extinct 1652 | — |
| Atholl | 17 February 1629 | Murray | Extant | Created Marquess of Atholl and Earl of Tullibardine in 1676 and Duke of Atholl, Marquess of Tullibardine and Earl of Strathtay and Strathardle in 1703 |
| Earl of Lothian | 31 October 1631 | Kerr | Extant | Also Earl of Lothian, also Earl of Ancram from 1690, created Marquess of Lothian in 1701 |
| Airth | 21 January 1633 | Graham | Extinct 1694 | — |
| Lindsay | 8 May 1633 | Lindsay, Bethune | Extant | Also Earl of Crawford 1642–1808; dormant 1808–1878 |
| Loudoun | 12 May 1633 | Campbell | Extant | — |
| Kinnoull | 25 May 1633 | Hay | Extant | — |
| Dumfries | 12 June 1633 | Crichton-Stuart | Extant | Also Marquess of Bute and Earl of Windsor in Great Britain and Earl of Bute from 1814 |
| Queensberry | 13 June 1633 | Douglas | Extant | Created Marquess of Queensberry in 1682, created Duke of Queensberry, Marquess of Dumfriesshire and Earl of Drumlanrig and Sanquhar in 1684, which titles separated 1810 |
| Angus | 14 June 1633 | Douglas | Extant | Subsidiary title of the Marquess of Douglas; also Duke of Hamilton, Duke of Brandon, and Marquess of Clydesdale from 1761 |
| Stirling | 14 June 1633 | Alexander | dormant 1739 | — |
| Elgin | 21 June 1633 | Bruce | Extant | Created Earl of Ailesbury in England in 1664, which title extinct 1747, also Earl of Kincardine from 1747 |
| Southesk | 22 June 1633 | Carnegie | Extant | Forfeit 1716–1855; also Duke of Fife since 1992 |
| Traquair | 23 June 1633 | Stuart | Extinct or dormant 1861 | — |
| Ancram | 24 June 1633 | Kerr | Extant | Also Earl of Lothian from 1690, created Marquess of Lothian in 1701 |
| Wemyss | 25 June 1633 | Wemyss | Extant | Forfeit 1756–1826; also Earl of March from 1826 |
| Dalhousie | 29 June 1633 | Ramsay | Extant | Created Marquess of Dalhousie in the United Kingdom in 1849, that title extinct 1860 |
| Findlater | 20 February 1638 | Ogilvy | dormant 1811 | — |
| Lanark | 31 March 1639 | Hamilton, Douglas-Hamilton | Extant | Also Duke of Hamilton from 1649 |
| Airlie | 2 April 1639 | Ogilvy | Extant | Forfeit 1717–1826 |
| Carnwath | 21 April 1639 | Dalzell | dormant 1941 | Forfeit 1716–1826 |
| Callendar | 6 October 1641 | Livingston | Forfeit 1716 | — |
| Leven | 11 October 1641 | Leslie | Extant | Also Earl of Melville from 1707 |
| Forth | 27 March 1642 | Ruthven | Extinct 1651 | — |
| Irvine | 28 March 1642 | Campbell | Extinct 1660 | — |
| Hartfell | 18 March 1643 | Johnstone | Extinct 1808 | Created Earl of Annandale and Hartfell in 1662 and Marquess of Annandale in 1703; all titles dormant from 1792 |
| Arran and Cambridge | 12 April 1643 | Hamilton | Extant | Subsidiary title of the Duke of Hamilton, created Marquess of Clydesdale at the same time, also Marquess of Douglas and Earl of Angus, created Duke of Brandon in Great Britain in 1711 |
| Dysart | 3 August 1643 | Murray, Greaves | Extant | — |
| Kincardine | 6 May 1644 | Graham | Extant | Subsidiary title of Marquess of Montrose. |
| Dirletoun | 1646 | Maxwell | Extinct 1650 | — |
| Panmure | 3 August 1646 | Maule | Forfeit 1715 | — |
| Selkirk | 4 August 1646 | Douglas-Hamilton | Extant | Also Duke of Hamilton, Marquess of Clydesdale, and Earl of Arran, Lanark and Cambridge 1660–1694 and from 1886 until 1940 and Duke of Brandon in Great Britain and Marquess of Douglas and Earl of Angus in Scotland from 1886 until 1940; disclaimed since 1994 |
| Tweeddale | 1 December 1646 | Hay | Extant | Created Marquess of Tweeddale and Earl of Gifford in 1690 |
| Northesk | 1 November 1647 | Carnegie | Extant | Created originally as Earl of Ethie; designation changed to Northesk in 1662 |
| Kincardine | 26 December 1647 | Bruce | Extant | Also Earl of Elgin from 1747 |
| Balcarres | 9 January 1651 | Lindsay | Extant | Also Earl of Crawford from 1848 |
| Ormond | 3 April 1651 | Douglas | Extinct 1715 | Created Forfar in 1661 |
| Tarras | 4 September 1660 | Scott | Extinct 1693 | — |
| Aboyne | 10 September 1660 | Gordon | Extant | Also Marquess of Huntly, Earl of Huntly and Earl of Enzie from 1836 |
| Earl of Arran, Lanark, and Selkirk | 20 September 1660 | Hamilton | Extinct 1694 | Peerage for life only; subsidiary title of the Duke of Hamilton; created Marquess of Clydesdale at the same time |
| Middleton | 1 October 1660 | Middleton | Forfeit 1695 | — |
| Newburgh | 31 December 1660 | Livingston | Extant | — |
| Dundee | 1661 | Scrimgeour | Extant | dormant 1668–1953 |
| Annandale and Hartfell | 13 February 1661 | Johnstone | Extant | dormant 1792–1985 |
| Kilmarnock | 7 August 1661 | Boyd | Forfeit 1746 | — |
| Forfar | 2 October 1661 | Douglas | Extinct 1715 | Also Earl of Ormonde of 1651 |
| Teviot | 2 February 1663 | Rutherford | Extinct 1664 | — |
| Dalkeith | 20 April 1663 | Scott | Extant | Subsidiary title of the Duke of Buccleuch, also Earl of Buccleuch, also Earl of Doncaster in England from 1743, also Duke of Queensberry, Marquess of Dumfriesshire and Earl of Drumlanrig and Sanquhar from 1810 |
| Dalkeith | 20 April 1663 | Scott | Forfeit 1685 | Subsidiary title of the Duke of Buccleuch, also Duke of Monmouth and Earl of Doncaster in England |
| Dundonald | 12 May 1669 | Cochrane | Extant | — |
| Dumbarton | 9 March 1675 | Douglas | Extinct 1749 | — |
| Darnley | 9 September 1675 | Gordon-Lennox | Extant | Subsidiary title of the Duke of Lennox, created Duke of Richmond and Earl of March in England at the same time, created Duke of Gordon and Earl of Kinrara in the United Kingdom in 1876 |
| Tullibardine | 17 February 1676 | Murray | Extant | Subsidiary title of the Marquess of Atholl, also Earl of Atholl, created Duke of Atholl, Marquess of Tullibardine and Earl of Strathtay and Strathardle in 1703 |
| Kintore | 20 June 1677 | Keith-Falconer | Extant | — |
| Breadalbane and Holland | 28 June 1677 | Campbell | dormant 1995 | Originally created Earl of Caithness; designation changed to Earl of Breadalbane and Holland 1681; created Marquess of Breadalbane and Earl of Ormelie in the United Kingdom in 1831, which titles extinct 1862, created Marquess of Breadalbane and Earl of Ormelie in the United Kingdom in 1885, which titles extinct 1922 |
| Leslie | 29 May 1680 | Leslie | Extinct 1681 | Subsidiary title of the Duke of Rothes; created Marquess of Bambreich at the same time |
| Drumlanrig and Sanquhar | 11 February 1682 | Douglas | Extant | Subsidiary title of the Marquess of Queensberry |
| Aberdeen | 30 November 1682 | Gordon | Extant | Created Marquess of Aberdeen and Temair and Earl of Haddo in the United Kingdom in 1916 |
| Huntly and Enzie | 3 November 1684 | Gordon | Extinct 1836 | Subsidiary title of the Duke of Gordon, created Marquess of Huntly at the same time; also Marquess of Huntly and Earl of Enzie |
| Drumlanrig and Sanquhar | 3 November 1684 | Douglas | Extant | Subsidiary title of the Duke of Queensberry, created Marquess of Dumfriesshire at the same time, also Marquess of Queensberry and Earl of Queensberry until 1810, also Duke of Buccleuch, Earl of Buccleuch and Earl of Dalkeith from 1810, also Earl of Doncaster in Peerage of England from 1810 |
| Melfort | 12 August 1686 | Drummond | dormant or extinct 1902 | Forfeit 1695–1853, also Earl of Perth 1853–1902 |
| Dunmore | 16 August 1686 | Murray | Extant | — |
| Melville | 8 April 1690 | Melville | Extant | Also Earl of Leven from 1707 |
| Gifford | 17 December 1694 | Hay | Extant | Subsidiary title of the Marquess of Tweeddale |
| Orkney | 3 January 1696 | Hamilton, Fitz-Maurice | Extant | — |
| Tullibardine | 27 July 1696 | Murray | Extinct 1724 | Peerage for life only. Also Marquess of Atholl and Earl of Tullibardine from May 1703 and Duke of Atholl and Marquess of Tullibardine from June 1703 |
| Ruglen | 14 April 1697 | Hamilton | Extinct 1810 | — |
| March | 20 April 1697 | Douglas | Extant | Also Earl of Wemyss from 1810 |
| Marchmont | 23 May 1697 | Hume | dormant 1794 | — |
| Ancram | 23 June 1701 | Kerr | Extant | Subsidiary title of the Marquess of Lothian |
| Campbell and Cowall | 23 June 1701 | Campbell | Extant | Subsidiary title of the Duke of Argyll, created Marquess of Kintyre and Lorne at the same time, also Earl of Ilay from 1743 until 1761, created Duke of Argyll in the United Kingdom in 1892 |
| Hartfell | 24 June 1701 | Johnston, Vanden-Bempde | dormant 1792 | Subsidiary title of the Marquess of Annandale |
| Seafield | 24 June 1701 | Ogilvie | Extant | — |
| Hyndford | 25 July 1701 | Carmichael | dormant 1817 | — |
| Cromartie | 1 January 1703 | Mackenzie | Forfeit 1745 | — |
| Stair | 8 April 1703 | Dalrymple | Extant | — |
| Rosebery | 10 April 1703 | Primrose | Extant | Created Earl of Midlothian in United Kingdom in 1911 |
| Glasgow | 12 April 1703 | Boyle | Extant | — |
| Portmore | 13 April 1703 | Colyear | Extinct 1835 | — |
| Bute | 14 April 1703 | Crichton-Stuart | Extant | Created Marquess of Bute and Earl of Windsor in Great Britain in 1796, also Earl of Dumfries from 1814 |
| Hopetoun | 15 April 1703 | Hope | Extant | Created Marquess of Linlithgow in the United Kingdom in 1902 |
| Strathtay and Strathardle | 30 June 1703 | Murray | Extant | Subsidiary title of the Duke of Atholl, created Marquess of Tullibardine at the same time, also Marquess of Atholl, Earl of Atholl and Earl of Tullibardine |
| Deloraine | 29 March 1706 | Scott | Extinct 1807 | — |
| Solway | 17 June 1706 | Douglas | Extinct 1778 | — |
| Ilay | 19 October 1706 | Campbell | Extinct 1761 | Also Duke of Argyll, Marquess of Kintyre and Lorne, Earl of Argyll and Earl of Campbell and Cowall from 1743 |
| Kincardine | 24 April 1707 | Graham | Extant | Subsidiary title of the Duke of Montrose, created Marquess of Graham and Buchanan at the same time, also Marquess of Montrose and Earl of Montrose, also Earl Graham of Belford in Great Britain from 1722 |
| Kelso | 25 April 1707 | Ker | Extant | Subsidiary title of the Duke of Roxburghe, created Marquess of Bowmont and Cessford at the same time, also Earl of Roxburghe, also Earl Ker in Great Britain from 1741 until 1804, created Earl Innes in the United Kingdom in 1837 |

== Earldoms in the Peerage of Great Britain, 1707–1801 ==
| British title | Creation | Surname | Current status | Notes (currently extant) |
|---|---|---|---|---|
| Oxford and Mortimer | 23 May 1711 | Harley | Extinct 1853 | — |
| Strafford | 29 June 1711 | Wentworth | Extinct 1799 | — |
| Ferrers | 3 September 1711 | Shirley | Extant | — |
| Dartmouth | 5 September 1711 | Legge | Extant | — |
| Tankerville | 19 October 1714 | Bennet | Extant | — |
| Aylesford | 19 October 1714 | Finch-Knightly | Extant | — |
| Bristol | 19 October 1714 | Hervey | Extant | Created Marquess of Bristol and Earl Jermyn in the United Kingdom in 1826 |
| Carnarvon | 19 October 1714 | Brydges | Extinct 1789 | Created Duke of Chandos and Marquess of Carnarvon in 1719 |
| Rockingham | 19 October 1714 | Watson | Extinct 1745 | — |
| Uxbridge | 19 October 1714 | Paget | Extinct 1769 | — |
| Clare | 19 October 1714 | Holles-Pelham | Extinct 1768 | Created Duke of Newcastle-upon-Tyne in 1715 and Duke of Newcastle-under-Lyme in 1756 |
| Halifax | 19 October 1714 | Montagu | Extinct 1715 | — |
| Granville | 1 January 1715 | Carteret | Extinct 1776 | — |
| Halifax | 14 June 1715 | Montagu | Extinct 1772 | — |
| Sussex | 26 February 1717 | Yelverton | Extinct 1799 | — |
| Cowper | 18 March 1718 | Cowper | Extinct 1905 | — |
| Stanhope | 14 April 1718 | Stanhope | Extinct 1967 | Also Earl of Chesterfield from 1952 |
| Cadogan | 8 May 1718 | Cadogan | Extinct 1726 | — |
| Feversham (Countess) | 19 March 1719 | Schulenburg | Extinct 1743 | Subsidiary title of the Duchess of Kendal, also Duchess of Munster, Marchioness of Dungannon and Countess of Dungannon in Ireland, peerage for life only |
| Coningsby | 30 April 1719 | Coningsby | Extinct 1761 | — |
| Harborough | 8 May 1719 | Sherard | Extinct 1859 | — |
| Castleton | 18 June 1720 | Saunderson | Extinct 1723 | — |
| Macclesfield | 15 November 1721 | Parker | Extant | — |
| Pomfret | 27 December 1721 | Fermor | Extinct 1867 | — |
| Darlington (Countess) | 6 April 1722 | Kielmansegge | Extinct 1730 | Also Countess of Leinster in Ireland, peerage for life only |
| Walsingham (Countess) | 7 April 1722 | Schulenberg | Extinct 1778 | Peerage for life only |
| Graham of Belford | 23 May 1722 | Graham | Extant | Succeeded as Duke of Montrose in 1742 |
| Ker | 24 May 1722 | Ker | Extinct 1804 | Also Duke of Roxburghe in Scotland from 1741 until 1804 |
| Eltham | 26 July 1726 | Guelph | Merged in crown 1760 | Subsidiary title of the Duke of Edinburgh |
| Kennington | 27 July 1726 | Guelph | Extinct 1765 | Subsidiary title of the Duke of Cumberland |
| Waldegrave | 13 September 1729 | Waldegrave | Extant | — |
| Ashburnham | 14 May 1730 | Ashburnham | Extinct 1924 | — |
| Wilmington | 14 May 1730 | Compton | Extinct 1743 | — |
| FitzWalter | 14 May 1730 | Mildmay | Extinct 1756 | — |
| Effingham | 8 December 1731 | Howard | Extinct 1816 | — |
| Malton | 19 November 1733 | Watson-Wentworth | Extinct 1782 | Created Marquess of Rockingham in 1746 |
| Yarmouth (Countess) | 24 March 1740 | Walmoden | Extinct 1765 | Peerage for life only |
| Orford | 6 February 1742 | Walpole | Extinct 1797 | — |
| Harrington | 9 February 1742 | Stanhope | Extant | — |
| Bath | 14 July 1742 | Pulteney | Extinct 1764 | — |
| Portsmouth | 11 April 1743 | Wallop | Extant | — |
| Leicester | 9 May 1744 | Coke | Extinct 1759 | — |
| Brooke | 7 July 1746 | Greville | Extant | Created Earl of Warwick in 1759 |
| Clinton | 5 July 1746 | Fortescue | Extinct 1751 | — |
| Gower | 8 July 1746 | Leveson-Gower | Extant | Created Marquess of Stafford in the United Kingdom in 1786 and Duke of Sutherland in the United Kingdom in 1833; also Earl of Sutherland in Scotland from 1839 until 1963 |
| Buckinghamshire | 5 September 1746 | Hobart | Extant | — |
| FitzWilliam | 6 September 1746 | Wentworth-FitzWilliam | Extinct 1979 | Also Earl FitzWilliam in Ireland |
| Powis | 27 May 1748 | Herbert | Extinct 1801 | — |
| Northumberland | 2 October 1749 | Seymour, Percy | Extant | Also Duke of Somerset 1749–1750; created Duke of Northumberland in 1766; also Earl of Beverley from 1865 |
| Egremont | 3 October 1749 | Seymour, Wyndham | Extinct 1845 | Also Duke of Somerset 1749–1750 |
| Temple | 18 October 1749 | Temple-Nugent-Brydges- Chandos-Grenville | Extinct 1889 | Created Marquess of Buckingham in 1784 and Duke of Buckingham and Chandos in 1822 |
| Harcourt | 1 December 1749 | Harcourt | Extinct 1830 | — |
| Hertford | 3 August 1750 | Seymour | Extant | Created Marquess of Hertford in 1793 |
| Guilford | 8 April 1752 | North | Extant | — |
| Cornwallis | 30 June 1753 | Cornwallis | Extinct 1852 | Created Marquess Cornwallis in 1792; that title extinct 1823 |
| Hardwicke | 2 April 1754 | Yorke | Extant | — |
| Darlington | 3 April 1754 | Vane, Powlett | Extinct 1891 | Created Marquess of Cleveland in 1827 and Duke of Cleveland in 1833 |
| Fauconberg | 16 June 1756 | Belasyse | Extinct 1802 | — |
| Ilchester | 17 June 1756 | Fox-Strangways | Extant | — |
| Warwick | 13 November 1759 | Greville | Extant | Also Earl Brooke |
| De La Warr | 18 March 1761 | West | Extant | — |
| Talbot | 19 March 1761 | Talbot | Extinct 1782 | — |
| Northington | 19 May 1764 | Henley | Extinct 1786 | — |
| Radnor | 31 October 1765 | de Bouverie | Extant | — |
| Spencer | 1 November 1765 | Spencer | Extant | — |
| Chatham | 4 August 1766 | Pitt | Extinct 1835 | — |
| Ligonier | 10 September 1766 | Ligonier | Extinct 1770 | — |
| Percy | 2 October 1766 | Percy-Seymour | Extant | Subsidiary title of the Duke of Northumberland, also Earl of Northumberland, also Earl of Beverley from 1865 |
| Bathurst | 27 August 1772 | Bathurst | Extant | — |
| Hillsborough | 28 August 1772 | Hill | Extant | Also Earl of Hillsborough in Ireland; created Marquess of Downshire in Ireland in 1789 |
| Ailesbury | 10 June 1776 | Bruce | Extant | Created Marquess of Ailesbury in the United Kingdom in 1821; also Earl of Cardigan in England from 1856 |
| Clarendon | 14 June 1776 | Villiers | Extant | — |
| Mansfield | 31 October 1776 | Murray | Extant | Created Earl of Mansfield in 1792; the two titles separated in 1793 and reunited in 1843 |
| Abergavenny | 17 May 1784 | Nevill | Extant | Created Marquess of Abergavenny in 1876 |
| Leicester | 18 May 1784 | Townshend | Extinct 1855 | Also Marquess Townshend from 1807 |
| Lonsdale | 24 May 1784 | Lowther | Extinct 1802 | — |
| Uxbridge | 19 September 1784 | Paget | Extant | Created Marquess of Anglesey in 1815 |
| Norwich | 2 July 1784 | Gordon | Extinct 1836 | Also Duke of Gordon |
| Talbot | 3 July 1784 | Chetwynd-Talbot | Extant | Also Earl of Shrewsbury in England and Earl of Waterford in Ireland from 1856 |
| Grosvenor | 5 July 1784 | Grosvenor | Extant | Created Marquess of Westminster in 1831 and Duke of Westminster in 1874 |
| Beaulieu | 8 July 1784 | Hussey Montagu | Extinct 1802 | — |
| Wycombe | 6 December 1784 | Petty-Fitzmaurice | Extant | Subsidiary title of the Marquess of Lansdowne; also Earl of Kerry in Ireland from 1818 |
| Camden | 13 May 1786 | Pratt | Extant | Created Marquess Camden in the United Kingdom in 1812 |
| Strange | 18 August 1786 | Stewart-Murray | Extinct 1957 | Also Duke of Atholl in the Peerage of Scotland |
| Howe | 19 April 1788 | Howe | Extinct 1799 | — |
| Mount Edgcumbe | 31 August 1789 | Edgcumbe | Extant | — |
| Fortescue | 1 September 1789 | Fortescue | Extant | — |
| Digby | 1 November 1790 | Digby | Extinct 1856 | — |
| Beverley | 2 November 1790 | Percy-Seymour | Extant | Also Duke of Northumberland from 1865 |
| Dorchester | 18 May 1792 | Damer | Extinct 1808 | — |
| Mansfield | 1 August 1792 | Murray | Extant | Also Earl of Mansfield of the 1776 creation 1792–1793 and since 1843 |
| Carnarvon | 3 July 1793 | Herbert | Extant | — |
| Yarmouth | 5 July 1793 | Seymour | Extant | Subsidiary title of the Marquess of Hertford |
| Windsor | 21 March 1796 | Crichton-Stuart | Extant | Subsidiary title of the Marquess of Bute; also Earl of Dumfries in Scotland from 1814 |
| Warrington | 22 April 1796 | Grey | Extinct 1883 | — |
| Liverpool | 1 June 1796 | Jenkinson | Extinct 1851 | — |
| St Vincent | 23 June 1797 | Jervis | Extinct 1823 | — |
| Cadogan | 27 December 1800 | Cadogan | Extant | — |
| Malmesbury | 29 December 1800 | Harris | Extant | — |

== Earldoms in the Peerage of Ireland, 1205–1831 ==
| Irish title | Creation | Surname | Current status | Notes (currently extant) |
|---|---|---|---|---|
| Ulster | 29 May 1205 | de Lacy | Extinct 1243 | — |
| Ulster | 1264 | de Burgh, Plantagenet, Mortimer, Plantagenet | Merged in crown 1461 | — |
| Carrick | 1315 | Butler | Extinct 1321 | — |
| Kildare | 14 March 1316 | FitzGerald | Extant | Created Marquess of Kildare and Earl of Offaly in 1761 and Duke of Leinster in 1766 |
| Louth | 12 May 1319 | Bermingham | Extinct 1329 | — |
| Ormonde | 2 November 1328 | Butler | dormant since 1997 | Created Earl of Ossory in 1538, which title dormant since 1997, created Marquess of Ormonde in 1642, which title extinct 1758, created Earl of Brecknock in England in 1660, which title forfeit 1715, created Duke of Ormonde in 1661, created Duke of Ormonde in England in 1682, which title forfeit 1715, created Marquess of Ormonde in 1816, which title extinct 1820, created Marquess of Ormonde in 1825, which title extinct 1997 |
| Desmond | 22 August 1329 | FitzGerald | Forfeit 1601 | — |
| Cork | 1396 | Plantagenet | Extinct 1415 | — |
| Waterford | 17 July 1446 | Talbot | Extant | Created Earl of Shrewsbury in England at the same time, also Earl Talbot of Hensol in Great Britain from 1856 |
| Ossory | 23 February 1528 | Butler | dormant since 1997 | Created Earl of Ossory in 1538, which title dormant since 1997, created Marquess of Ormonde in 1642, which title extinct 1758, created Earl of Brecknock in England in 1660, which title forfeit 1715, created Duke of Ormonde in 1661, created Duke of Ormonde in England in 1682, which title forfeit 1715, created Marquess of Ormonde in 1816, which title extinct 1820, created Marquess of Ormonde in 1825, which title extinct 1997 |
| Ormonde | 8 December 1529 | Boleyne | Extinct 1538 | Created Earl of Wiltshire in England at the same time |
| Tyrone | 1 October 1542 | O'Neill | Forfeit 1608 | — |
| Clanricarde | 1 July 1543 | de Burgh-Canning | Extinct 1916 | Created Marquess of Clanricarde in 1785, that title extinct 1797, created Marquess of Clanricarde in 1825 |
| Thomond | 1 July 1543 | O'Brien | Extinct 1741 | — |
| Kildare | 13 May 1554 | FitzGerald | Extinct 1599 | — |
| Clancare | 24 June 1565 | McCarthy | Resigned 1597 | — |
| Clanconnel | May 1578 | O'Neill | Extinct 1595 | For life only |
| Desmond | 1 October 1600 | FitzGerald | Extinct 7 November 1601 | — |
| Tyrconnell | 27 September 1603 | O'Donnell | Forfeit 1608 | — |
| Castlehaven | 6 September 1616 | Touchet | Extinct 1777 | — |
| Desmond | 11 July 1619 | Preston | Extinct 1628 | — |
| Cork | 26 October 1620 | Boyle | Extant | Also Earl of Orrery from 1753 |
| Antrim | 12 December 1620 | Mcdonnel | Extinct 1791 | — |
| Westmeath | 4 September 1621 | Nugent | Extant | Created Marquess of Westmeath in 1822; that title extinct 1871 |
| Roscommon | 5 August 1622 | Dillon | Extinct 1850 | — |
| Londonderry | 23 August 1622 | Ridgeway | Extinct 1714 | — |
| Meath | 16 April 1627 | Brabazon | Extant | — |
| Barrymore | 28 February 1628 | Barry | Extinct 1824 | — |
| Carbery | 5 August 1628 | Vaughan | Extinct 1712 | — |
| Fingall | 26 September 1628 | Plunkett | Extinct 1984 | — |
| Downe | 16 October 1628 | Pope | Extinct 1668 | — |
| Desmond | 28 October 1628 | Feilding | Extant | Also Earl of Denbigh in England from 1675 |
| Ardglass | 15 April 1645 | Cromwell | Extinct 1687 | — |
| Leinster | 3 March 1646 | Cholmondeley | Extinct 1659 | — |
| Donegall | 30 March 1647 | Chichester | Extant | Created Marquess of Donegall and Earl of Belfast in 1791 |
| Cavan | 1 April 1647 | Lambart | Extant | — |
| Clanbrassill | 7 June 1647 | Hamilton | Extinct 1675 | — |
| Inchiquin | 21 October 1654 | O'Brien | Extinct 1855 | Created Marquess of Thomond in 1800; that title extinct 1855 |
| Clancarty | 27 November 1658 | McCarthy | Forfeit 1690 | — |
| Ulster | 10 May 1659 | Stewart | Merged in crown 1685 | Subsidiary title of the Duke of York and Albany |
| Orrery | 5 September 1660 | Boyle | Extant | Also Earl of Cork from 1753 |
| Mountrath | 6 September 1660 | Coote | Extinct 1802 | — |
| Tyrconnel | 20 April 1661 | Fitzwilliam | Extinct 1667 | — |
| Drogheda | 14 June 1661 | Moore | Extant | Created Marquess of Drogheda in 1791; that title extinct 1892 |
| Carlingford | 26 June 1661 | Taaffe | Extinct 1738 | — |
| Mount Alexander | 18 July 1661 | Montgomery | Extinct 1757 | — |
| Castlemaine | 11 December 1661 | Palmer | Extinct 1705 | — |
| Arran | 13 May 1662 | Butler | Extinct 1685 | — |
| Tyrone | 9 October 1673 | Le Poer | Extinct 1704 | — |
| Ranelagh | 11 December 1674 | Jones | Extinct 1711 | — |
| Gowran | 13 April 1676 | Butler | Extinct 1677 | — |
| Longford | 18 December 1677 | Aungier | Extinct 1704 | — |
| Bellomont | 9 December 1680 | Kirckhoven | Extinct 1683 | — |
| Granard | 30 December 1684 | Forbes | Extant | — |
| Tyrconnel | 20 June 1685 | Talbot | Forfeit 1691 | — |
| Limerick | 2 January 1686 | Dungan, Dongan | Extinct 1715 | — |
| Bellomont | 2 November 1689 | Coote | Extinct 1766 | — |
| Bangor | 3 March 1691 | Schomberg | Extinct 1719 | Subsidiary title of the Duke of Leinster, also Duke of Schomberg, Marquess of Harwich and Earl of Brentford in England |
| Athlone | 4 March 1692 | Ginkel | Extinct 1844 | — |
| Arran | 8 March 1693 | Butler | Extinct 1759 | — |
| Galway | 12 May 1697 | Massue | Extinct 1720 | — |
| Rathfarnham | 7 January 1715 | Wharton | Extinct 1731 | Subsidiary title of the Marquess of Catherlough; also Marquess of Wharton and Marquess of Malmesbury; created Duke of Wharton in 1718 |
| Ulster | 5 July 1716 | Guelph | Extinct 1728 | Subsidiary title of the Duke of York and Albany |
| Dungannon (Countess) | 18 July 1716 | Schulenberg | Extinct 1743 | Subsidiary title of the Duchess of Munster, created Marchioness of Dungannon at the same time, created Duchess of Kendal and Countess of Feversham in Great Britain in 1719, peerage for life only |
| Fitzwilliam | 21 July 1716 | Wentworth-Fitzwilliam | Extinct 1979 | Created Earl Fitzwilliam in the United Kingdom in 1746 |
| Rosse | 16 June 1718 | Parsons | Extinct 1764 | — |
| Shelburne | 29 April 1719 | Petty | Extinct 1751 | — |
| Grandison | 11 September 1721 | Villiers | Extinct 1766 | — |
| Leinster (Countess) | 11 September 1721 | Kielmansegge | Extinct 1730 | Created Countess of Darlington in Great Britain in 1722 |
| Kerry | 17 January 1723 | Fitzmaurice | Extant | Also Marquess of Lansdowne and Earl of Wycombe in Great Britain and Earl of Shelburne from 1818 |
| Darnley | 29 June 1725 | Bligh | Extant | — |
| Londonderry | 8 October 1726 | Pitt | Extinct 1764 | — |
| Tylney | 11 June 1731 | Child | Extinct 1784 | — |
| Egmont | 6 November 1733 | Perceval | Extinct 2011 | — |
| Bessborough | 6 October 1739 | Ponsonby | Extant | Created Earl of Bessborough in the United Kingdom in 1937 |
| Verney | 22 March 1743 | Verney | Extinct 1791 | — |
| Panmure | 6 April 1743 | Maule | Extinct 1782 | — |
| Blessington | 7 December 1745 | Stewart | Extinct 1769 | — |
| Tyrone | 18 July 1746 | Beresford | Extant | Created Marquess of Waterford in 1789 |
| Carrick | 10 June 1748 | Butler | Extant | — |
| Malton | 17 September 1750 | Watson-Wentworth | Extinct 1782 | Also Marquess of Rockingham and Earl of Malton in Great Britain from 1750 |
| Hillsborough | 3 October 1751 | Hill | Extant | Created Earl of Hillsborough in Great Britain in 1772 and Marquess of Downshire in 1789 |
| Upper Ossory | 5 October 1751 | Fitzpatrick | Extinct 1818 | — |
| Shelburne | 6 June 1753 | Petty-Fitzmaurice | Extant | Created Marquess of Lansdowne in Great Britain in 1784; also Earl of Kerry from 1818 |
| Shannon | 20 March 1756 | Boyle | Extant | — |
| Lanesborough | 20 July 1756 | Butler | Extinct 1998 | — |
| Massereene | 28 July 1756 | Skeffington | Extinct 1816 | — |
| Clanbrassill | 24 November 1756 | Hamilton | Extinct 1798 | — |
| Belvedere | 29 November 1756 | Rochfort | Extinct 1814 | — |
| Thomond | 11 December 1756 | O'Brien | Extinct 1774 | — |
| Wandesford | 15 August 1758 | Wandesford | Extinct 1784 | — |
| Brandon (Countess) | 15 September 1758 | Bermingham | Extinct 1789 | For life only |
| Charleville | 16 September 1758 | Moore | Extinct 1764 | — |
| Louth | 23 April 1759 | Bermingham | Extinct 1799 | — |
| Fife | 26 April 1759 | Duff | Extinct 1912 | Created Earl of Fife in the United Kingdom in 1885, Duke of Fife in the United Kingdom in 1889 and Duke of Fife in the United Kingdom in 1900 |
| Ulster | 1 April 1760 | Guelph | Extinct 1767 | Subsidiary title of the Duke of York and Albany |
| Mornington | 2 October 1760 | Wesley | Extant | Also Marquess Wellesley in the peerage of Ireland 1799–1842; also Duke of Wellington, Marquess of Wellington, Marquess Douro and Earl of Wellington in the United Kingdom from 1863 |
| Ludlow | 3 October 1760 | Ludlow | Extinct 1842 | — |
| Offaly | 3 March 1761 | FitzGerald | Extant | Subsidiary title of the Marquess of Kildare; created Duke of Leinster in 1766 |
| Tyrconnel | 1 May 1761 | Carpenter | Extinct 1853 | Also Baron Carpenter in Ireland |
| Moira | 30 January 1762 | Rawdon | Extinct 1868 | Created Marquess of Hastings in the United Kingdom in 1817 |
| Arran | 12 April 1762 | Gore | Extant | — |
| Courtown | 12 April 1762 | Stopford | Extant | — |
| Milltown | 10 May 1763 | Leeson | Extinct 1891 | — |
| Farnham | 13 May 1763 | Maxwell | Extinct 1779 | — |
| Catherlough | 16 May 1763 | Knight | Extinct 1772 | — |
| Charlemont | 23 December 1763 | Caulfield | Extinct 1892 | — |
| Connaught | 19 November 1764 | Guelph | Extinct 1834 | Subsidiary title of the Duke of Gloucester and Edinburgh |
| Mexborough | 11 February 1766 | Savile | Extant | — |
| Winterton | 12 February 1766 | Turnour | Extant | — |
| Dublin | 22 October 1766 | Guelph | Extinct 1790 | Subsidiary title of the Duke of Cumberland and Strathearn |
| Ely | 23 October 1766 | Hume-Loftus | Extinct 1769 | — |
| Bective | 24 October 1766 | Taylour | Extant | Created Marquess of Headfort in 1800 |
| Grandison | 19 February 1767 | Villiers | Extinct 1800 | — |
| Howth | 3 September 1767 | St. Lawrence | Extinct 1909 | — |
| Bellamont | 4 September 1767 | Coote | Extinct 1800 | — |
| Kingston | 25 August 1768 | King | Extant | — |
| Sefton | 30 November 1771 | Molyneux | Extinct 1972 | — |
| Roden | 1 December 1771 | Jocelyn | Extant | — |
| Ely | 2 December 1771 | Loftus | Extinct 1783 | — |
| Seaforth | 3 December 1771 | Mackenzie | Extinct 1781 | — |
| Altamont | 4 December 1771 | Browne | Extant | Created Marquess of Sligo and Earl of Clanricarde in 1800 |
| Ross | 4 January 1772 | Gore | Extinct 1802 | — |
| Lisburne | 18 July 1776 | Vaughan | Extant | — |
| Ligonier | 19 July 1776 | Ligonier | Extinct 1782 | Second creation (the first was in the Peerage of Great Britain) |
| Clanwilliam | 20 July 1776 | Meade | Extant | — |
| Nugent | 21 July 1776 | Temple-Nugent-Brydges- Chandos-Grenville | Extinct 1889 | Also Marquess of Buckingham and Earl Temple in Great Britain from 1788; created Duke of Buckingham and Chandos, Marquess of Chandos, and Earl Temple of Stowe in the United Kingdom in 1822 |
| Glandore | 22 July 1776 | Crosbie | Extinct 1826 | — |
| Shipbrook | 8 February 1777 | Vernon | Extinct 1783 | — |
| Aldborough | 9 February 1777 | Stratford | Extinct 1875 | — |
| Clermont | 10 February 1777 | Fortescue | Extinct 1806 | — |
| Conyngham | 4 January 1781 | Conyngham | Extinct 1781 | — |
| Mount Cashell | 5 January 1781 | Moore | Extinct 1915 | — |
| Ulster | 29 November 1784 | Guelph | Extinct 1827 | Subsidiary title of the Duke of York and Albany |
| Antrim | 19 June 1785 | McDonnel | Extant | — |
| Longford (Countess) | 20 June 1785 | Pakenham | Extant | — |
| Portarlington | 21 June 1785 | Dawson | Extant | — |
| Farnham | 22 June 1785 | Maxwell | Extinct 1823 | — |
| Carhampton | 23 June 1785 | Luttrell | Extinct 1829 | — |
| Mayo | 24 June 1785 | Bourke | Extant | — |
| Munster | 20 May 1789 | Guelph | Merged in crown 1830 | Subsidiary title of the Duke of Clarence and St Andrews |
| Annesley | 17 August 1789 | Annesley | Extant | — |
| Erne | 18 August 1789 | Crichton | Extant | — |
| Enniskillen | 18 August 1789 | Cole | Extant | — |
| Carysfort | 18 August 1789 | Proby | Extinct 1909 | — |
| Belfast | 27 June 1791 | Chichester | Extant | Subsidiary title of the Marquess of Donegall |
| Mountnorris | 20 December 1793 | Annesley | Extinct 1844 | — |
| Wicklow (Countess) | 20 December 1793 | Forward-Howard | Extinct 1978 | — |
| Kilkenny | 20 December 1793 | Butler | Extinct 1846 | — |
| Clonmell | 20 December 1793 | Scott | Extinct 1935 | — |
| Desart | 20 December 1793 | Cuffe | Extinct 1934 | — |
| Macartney | 1 March 1794 | Macartney | Extinct 1806 | — |
| Ely | 2 March 1794 | Tottenham | Extant | Created Marquess of Ely in 1800 |
| Clare | 12 June 1795 | FitzGibbon | Extinct 1864 | — |
| Lucan | 1 October 1795 | Bingham | Extant | — |
| Leitrim | 6 October 1795 | Clements | Extinct 1952 | — |
| Londonderry | 17 August 1796 | Stewart | Extant | Created Marquess of Londonderry in 1816; also Earl Vane in the United Kingdom 1823–1854, and from 1872 |
| Conyngham | 5 November 1797 | Conyngham | Extant | Created Marquess Conyngham in 1816 |
| Belmore | 20 November 1797 | Lowry-Corry | Extant | — |
| Landaff | 22 November 1797 | Mathew | Extinct 1833 | — |
| Dublin | 24 April 1799 | Guelph | Extinct 1820 | Subsidiary title of the Duke of Kent and Strathearn |
| Armagh | 24 April 1799 | Guelph | Suspended 1919 | Subsidiary title of the Duke of Cumberland and Teviotdale |
| Bandon | 6 August 1800 | Bernard | Extinct 1979 | — |
| Earl O'Neill | August 1800 | O'Neill | Extinct 1841 | — |
| Castle Stewart | 29 December 1800 | Stuart | Extant | — |
| Clanricarde | 29 December 1800 | de Burgh | Extant | Held by the Earl of Clanricarde of the 1543 creation until that title became extinct in 1916, thereafter by the Marquess of Sligo |
| Caledon | 29 December 1800 | Alexander | Extant | — |
| Donoughmore | 31 December 1800 | Hely-Hutchinson | Extant | — |
| Kenmare | 3 January 1801 | Browne | Extinct 1952 | — |
| Limerick | 22 January 1803 | Pery | Extant | — |
| Clancarty | 12 February 1803 | Le Poer Trench | Extant | — |
| Rosse | 3 February 1806 | Parsons | Extant | — |
| Gosford | 4 February 1806 | Acheson | Extant | — |
| Normanton | 4 February 1806 | Agar | Extant | — |
| Charleville | 16 February 1806 | Bury | Extinct 1875 | — |
| Glengall | 22 January 1816 | Butler | Extinct 1858 | — |
| Mount Charles | 22 January 1816 | Conyngham | Extant | Subsidiary title of the Marquess Conyngham, also Earl Conyngham |
| Bantry | 22 January 1816 | Hedges-White | Extinct 1891 | — |
| Blessington | 22 January 1816 | Gardiner | Extinct 1829 | — |
| Sheffield | 22 January 1816 | Holroyd | Extinct 1909 | — |
| Rathdowne | 12 January 1822 | Monck | Extinct 1848 | — |
| Kilmorey | 12 January 1822 | Needham | Extant | — |
| Earl of Dunraven and Mount-Earl | 5 February 1822 | Wyndham-Quin | Extinct 2011 | — |
| Listowel | 5 February 1822 | Hare | Extant | — |
| Norbury | 23 June 1827 | Toler | Extant | — |
| Ranfurly | 14 September 1831 | Knox | Extant | — |

== Earldoms in the Peerage of the United Kingdom, 1801 to present ==
| United Kingdom title | Creation | Surname | Current status | Notes (currently extant) |
|---|---|---|---|---|
| Rosslyn | 21 April 1801 | Wedderburn, St. Clair-Erskine | Extant | — |
| Onslow | 17 June 1801 | Onslow | Extant | — |
| Craven | 18 June 1801 | Craven | Extant | — |
| Romney | 22 June 1801 | Marsham | Extant | — |
| Chichester | 23 June 1801 | Pelham | Extant | — |
| Wilton | 26 June 1801 | Egerton | Extant | — |
| Inverness | 27 November 1801 | Guelph | Extinct 21 April 1843 | Subsidiary title of the Duke of York |
| Tipperary | 27 November 1801 | Guelph | Extinct 17 March 1904 | Subsidiary title of the Duke of Cambridge |
| Bath (Countess) | 26 October 1803 | Murray-Pulteney | Extinct 14 July 1808 | — |
| Powis | 14 May 1804 | Clive | Extant | — |
| Nelson | 20 November 1805 | Nelson | Extant | — |
| Manvers | 9 April 1806 | Pierrepont, Medows | Extinct 13 February 1955 | — |
| Orford | 10 April 1806 | Walpole | Extinct 27 September 1931 | — |
| Grey | 11 April 1806 | Grey | Extant | — |
| Lonsdale | 7 April 1807 | Lowther | Extant | — |
| Harrowby | 19 July 1809 | Ryder | Extant | — |
| Wellington | 28 February 1812 | Wellesley | Extant | Created Marquess of Wellington in 1812 and Duke of Wellington in 1814; also Earl of Mornington from 1863 |
| Compton | 7 September 1812 | Compton | Extant | Subsidiary title of the Marquess of Northampton |
| Brecknock | 7 September 1812 | Pratt | Extant | Subsidiary title of the Marquess Camden |
| Mulgrave | 7 September 1812 | Phipps | Extant | Created Marquess of Normanby in 1838 |
| Harewood | 7 September 1812 | Lascelles | Extant | — |
| Minto | 24 February 1813 | Elliot | Extant | — |
| Cathcart | 16 July 1814 | Cathcart | Extant | — |
| Brownlow | 17 November 1815 | Cust | Extinct 17 March 1921 | — |
| Rocksavage | 22 November 1815 | Cholmondeley | Extant | Subsidiary title of the Marquess of Cholmondeley, also Earl of Cholmondeley in England |
| Verulam | 24 November 1815 | Grimston | Extant | — |
| Whitworth | 25 November 1815 | Whitworth | Extinct 12 May 1825 | — |
| St Germans | 28 November 1815 | Eliot | Extant | — |
| Morley | 29 November 1815 | Parker | Extant | — |
| Bradford | 30 November 1815 | Bridgeman | Extant | — |
| Beauchamp | 1 December 1815 | Lygon | Extinct 3 January 1979 | — |
| Countess de Grey | 25 October 1816 | Robinson | Extinct 22 September 1923 | Also Earl of Ripon from 1859; created Marquess of Ripon in 1871 |
| Rawdon | 3 February 1817 | Rawdon | Extinct 1 November 1868 | Subsidiary title of the Marquess of Hastings; also Earl of Moira in Ireland |
| Eldon | 7 July 1821 | Scott | Extant | — |
| Bruce | 17 July 1821 | Bruce | Extant | Subsidiary title of the Marquess of Ailesbury, also Earl of Ailesbury in Great Britain, also Earl of Cardigan in England from 1856 |
| Falmouth | 14 July 1821 | Boscawen | Extinct 29 August 1852 | — |
| Howe | 15 July 1821 | Curzon | Extant | — |
| Somers | 17 July 1821 | Somers-Cocks | Extinct 26 September 1883 | — |
| Stradbroke | 18 July 1821 | Rous | Extant | — |
| Temple of Stowe | 4 February 1822 | Temple-Gore-Langton | Extant | Also Duke of Buckingham and Chandos until 1889 |
| Vane | 28 March 1823 | Stewart | Extant | Also Marquess of Londonderry and Earl of Londonderry in Ireland to 1854 and from 1872 |
| Jermyn | 30 June 1826 | Jermyn | Extant | Subsidiary title of the Marquess of Bristol |
| Amherst | 19 December 1826 | Amherst | Extinct 4 March 1993 | — |
| Cawdor | 5 October 1827 | Campbell | Extant | — |
| Dudley | 5 October 1827 | Ward | Extinct 6 March 1833 | — |
| Munster | 4 June 1831 | Fitzclarence | Extinct 30 December 2000 | — |
| Ormelie | 12 September 1831 | Campbell | Extinct 8 November 1862 | Subsidiary title of the Marquess of Breadalbane |
| Burlington | 10 September 1831 | Cavendish | Extant | Also Duke of Devonshire from 1858 |
| Camperdown | 12 September 1831 | Haldane-Duncan | Extinct 5 December 1933 | — |
| Lichfield | 15 September 1831 | Anson | Extant | — |
| Durham | 23 March 1833 | Lambton | Extant | — |
| Ripon | 13 April 1833 | Robinson | Extinct 1923 | Also Earl de Grey from 1859; created Marquess of Ripon in 1871 |
| Granville | 10 May 1833 | Leveson-Gower | Extant | — |
| Effingham | 27 January 1837 | Howard | Extant | — |
| Ducie | 28 January 1837 | Moreton | Extant | — |
| Yarborough | 30 January 1837 | Anderson-Pelham | Extant | — |
| Innes | 11 August 1837 | Innes | Extant | Also Duke of Roxburghe |
| Leicester | 12 August 1837 | Coke | Extant | — |
| Lovelace | 30 June 1838 | King | Extinct 31 January 2018 | — |
| Zetland | 2 July 1838 | Dundas | Extant | Created Marquess of Zetland and Earl of Ronaldshay in 1892 |
| Auckland | 21 December 1839 | Eden | Extinct 1 January 1849 | — |
| FitzHardinge | 17 August 1841 | Berkeley | Extinct 10 October 1857 | — |
| Gainsborough | 26 August 1841 | Noel | Extant | — |
| Ellenborough | 22 October 1844 | Law | Extinct 22 December 1871 | — |
| Ellesmere | 6 July 1846 | Leveson-Gower | Extant | Also Duke of Sutherland from 1963 |
| Strafford | 18 September 1847 | Byng | Extant | — |
| Dublin | 17 January 1850 | Wettin | Merged in crown 22 January 1901 | Also Prince of Wales, Duke of Cornwall and Earl of Chester in England and Duke of Rothesay and Earl of Carrick in Scotland |
| Cottenham | 11 June 1850 | Pepys | Extant | — |
| Cowley | 11 April 1857 | Wellesley | Extant | — |
| Canning | 21 May 1859 | Canning | Extinct 17 June 1862 | — |
| Winton | 23 June 1859 | Montgomerie | Extant | Also Earl of Eglinton in Scotland |
| Dudley | 17 February 1860 | Ward | Extant | — |
| Russell | 30 July 1861 | Russell | Extant | — |
| Cromartie (Countess) | 21 October 1861 | Mackenzie | Extant | — |
| St Maur | 19 June 1863 | St. Maur, Seymour | Extinct 28 November 1885 | Also Duke of Somerset |
| Kent | 24 May 1866 | Wettin | Extinct 30 July 1900 | Subsidiary title of the Duke of Edinburgh, created Earl of Ulster at the same time. 9th and last creation |
| Ulster | 24 May 1866 | Wettin | Extinct 30 July 1900 | Subsidiary title of the Duke of Edinburgh, created Earl of Kent at the same time |
| Kimberley | 1 June 1866 | Wodehouse | Extant | — |
| Dartrey | 12 July 1866 | Dawson | Extinct 9 February 1933 | — |
| Feversham | 25 July 1868 | Duncombe | Extinct 4 September 1963 | — |
| Dufferin | 13 November 1871 | Hamilton-Temple-Blackwood | Extinct 29 May 1988 | Created Marquess of Dufferin and Ava in 1888 |
| Sydney | 27 February 1874 | Townshend | Extinct 14 February 1890 | — |
| Ravensworth | 2 April 1874 | Liddell | Extinct 7 February 1904 | — |
| Sussex | 24 May 1874 | Wettin | Extinct 26 April 1943 | Subsidiary title of the Duke of Connaught and Strathearn |
| Kinrara | 13 January 1876 | Gordon-Lennox | Extant | Subsidiary title of the Duke of Gordon, also Duke of Richmond and Earl of March in England and Duke of Lennox and Earl of Darnley in Scotland |
| Lewes | 14 January 1876 | Nevill | Extant | Subsidiary title of the Marquess of Abergavenny, also Earl of Abergavenny in Great Britain |
| Wharncliffe | 15 January 1876 | Montagu-Stuart-Wortley-Mackenzie, Wortley | Extant | — |
| Northbrook | 10 June 1876 | Baring | Extinct 12 April 1929 | — |
| Beaconsfield | 21 August 1876 | Disraeli | Extinct 19 April 1881 | — |
| Redesdale | 3 January 1877 | Freeman-Mitford | Extinct 2 May 1886 | — |
| Cairns | 27 September 1878 | Cairns | Extant | — |
| Lytton | 28 April 1880 | Bulwer-Lytton | Extant | Former Viceroy of India |
| Lathom | 3 May 1880 | Bootle-Wilbraham | Extinct 6 February 1930 | — |
| Sondes | 4 May 1880 | Watson, Milles | Extinct 2 December 1996 | — |
| Clarence | 24 May 1881 | Wettin | Suspended 1919 | Subsidiary title of the Duke of Albany |
| Selborne | 30 December 1882 | Palmer | Extant | — |
| Iddesleigh | 3 July 1885 | Northcote | Extant | — |
| Ormelie | 11 July 1885 | Campbell | Extinct 19 October 1922 | Subsidiary title of the Marquess of Breadalbane, also Earl of Breadalbane and Holland in Scotland |
| Fife | 13 July 1885 | Duff | Extinct 29 January 1912 | Also Earl Fife; created Duke of Fife in 1889 and 1900 |
| Earl de Montalt | 9 September 1886 | Maude | Extinct 1905 | — |
| Londesborough | 1 July 1887 | Denison | Extinct 17 April 1937 | — |
| Ava | 17 November 1888 | Hamilton-Temple-Blackwood | Extinct 29 May 1988 | Subsidiary title of the Marquess of Dufferin and Ava |
| Athlone | 24 May 1890 | Wettin | Extinct 14 January 1892 | Subsidiary title of the Duke of Clarence and Avondale |
| Inverness | 24 May 1892 | Wettin | Merged in crown 1910 | Subsidiary title of the Duke of York |
| Ancaster | 22 August 1892 | Heathcote-Drummond- Willoughby | Extinct 29 March 1983 | — |
| Cranbrook | 22 August 1892 | Gathorne-Hardy | Extant | — |
| Ronaldshay | 22 August 1892 | Dundas | Extant | Subsidiary title of the Marquess of Zetland, also Earl of Zetland |
| Carrington | 16 July 1895 | Wynn-Carrington, Carington | Extinct 13 June 1928 | Created Marquess of Lincolnshire in 1912 |
| Crewe | 17 July 1895 | Crewe-Milnes, Offley | Extinct 20 June 1945 | Created Marquess of Crewe in 1911 |
| Egerton | 22 July 1897 | Egerton | Extinct 16 March 1909 | — |
| Halsbury | 19 January 1898 | Giffard | Extinct 2010 | — |
| Macduff | 24 April 1900 | Carnegie | Extant | Subsidiary title of the Duke of Fife, also Duke of Fife, Marquess of Macduff and Earl of Fife until 1912 and Earl Fife in Ireland until 1912 |
| Roberts | 11 February 1901 | Roberts, Lewin | Extinct 21 February 1955 | British Army officer; Commander-in-Chief of the Forces (from 1900 to 1904); former Commander-in-Chief of the British Forces in South Africa, Commander-in-Chief, Ireland, and Commander-in-Chief, India |
| Cromer | 8 August 1901 | Baring | Extant | Colonial administrator; Consul-General of Egypt (from 1883 to 1907) |
| Plymouth | 18 December 1905 | Windsor-Clive | Extant | Conservative Party politician; former First Commissioner of Works (from 1902 to 1905) |
| Liverpool | 22 December 1905 | Foljambe | Extant | Liberal Party politician; Lord Steward of the Household (from 1905 to 1907) |
| Madeley | 3 July 1911 | Crewe-Milnes, Offley | Extinct 20 June 1945 | Subsidiary title of the Marquess of Crewe, also Earl of Crewe |
| Loreburn | 4 July 1911 | Reid | Extinct 30 November 1923 | Liberal Party politician; Lord High Chancellor (from 1905 to 1912) |
| Midlothian | 3 July 1911 | Primrose | Extant | Former Prime Minister (from 1894 to 1895); also Earl of Rosebery in Scotland |
| Brassey | 5 July 1911 | Brassey | Extinct 12 November 1919 | Liberal Party politician; Lord Warden of the Cinque Ports (from 1908 to 1913); former Governor of Victoria (from 1895 to 1900) |
| Curzon of Kedleston | 2 November 1911 | Curzon | Extinct 20 March 1925 | Conservative Party politician; former Viceroy of India (from 1899 to 1905); created Marquess Curzon of Kedleston in 1921 |
| Kitchener | 27 July 1914 | Kitchener | Extinct 16 December 2011 | British Army officer and cabinet minister; Secretary of State for War (from 1914 to 1916); formerly British Consul-General in Egypt and Commander-in-Chief, India |
| St Aldwyn | 22 February 1915 | Hicks-Beach | Extant | Conservative Party politician; former Chancellor of the Exchequer (from 1895 to 1902); elevated to an earldom following his work on government finances during the First World War |
| Haddo | 4 January 1916 | Gordon | Extant | Subsidiary title of the Marquess of Aberdeen and Temair |
| Eltham | 16 July 1917 | Cambridge | Extinct 1981 | Subsidiary title of the Marquess of Cambridge |
| Athlone | 16 July 1917 | Cambridge | Extinct 16 January 1957 | Cousin and brother-in-law of George V; ennobled after relinquishing his German titles |
| Medina | 17 July 1917 | Mountbatten | Extant | Subsidiary title of the Marquess of Milford Haven |
| Berkhampsted | 18 July 1917 | Mountbatten | Extinct 23 February 1960 | Subsidiary title of the Marquess of Carisbrooke |
| Reading | 20 December 1917 | Isaacs | Extant | Liberal Party politician; Lord Chief Justice of England (from 1913 to 1921) and former Attorney General (from 1910 to 1913); created Marquess of Reading in 1926. |
| Beatty | 27 September 1919 | Beatty | Extant | Royal Navy officer; Commander-in-Chief of the Grand Fleet (from 1916 to 1919) |
| Haig | 29 September 1919 | Haig | Extant | British Army officer; Commander-in-Chief of the British Expeditionary Force (from 1915 to 1919) |
| Iveagh | 30 September 1919 | Guinness | Extant | Businessman and philanthropist |
| Midleton | 2 February 1920 | Brodrick | Extinct 2 November 1979 | Conservative Party and Irish Unionist Alliance politician; former leader of the latter (from 1910 to 1919) and a former cabinet minister |
| Inverness | 3 June 1920 | Windsor | Merged in crown 11 December 1936 | Subsidiary title of the Duke of York |
| Buxton | 8 November 1920 | Buxton | Extinct 15 October 1934 | Liberal Party politician and colonial administrator; Governor-General of South Africa (from 1914 to 1920) |
| Kedleston | 28 June 1921 | Curzon | Extinct 20 March 1925 | Conservative Party politician; Foreign Secretary (from 1919 to 1924); former Viceroy of India (from 1899 to 1905); subsidiary title of the Marquess Curzon of Kedleston |
| Balfour | 5 May 1922 | Balfour | Extant | Former Prime Minister (from 1902 to 1905) |
| Ypres | 5 June 1922 | French | Extinct 1988 | British Army officer; former Lord Lieutenant of Ireland (from 1918 to 1921), and Commander-in-Chief of the Home Forces (from 1915 to 1918) and of the British Expeditionary Force (from 1914 to 1915). |
| Birkenhead | 28 November 1922 | Smith | Extinct 18 February 1985 | Conservative Party politician and barrister; former Lord High Chancellor (from 1919 to 1922) |
| Farquhar | 30 November 1922 | Townsend-Farquhar | Extinct 30 August 1923 | Courtier, Conservative Party politician and financier; former Lord Steward of the Household (from 1915 to 1922) |
| Oxford and Asquith | 9 February 1925 | Asquith | Extant | Former Prime Minister (1908 to 1916) |
| Jellicoe | 29 June 1925 | Extant | Former Governor-General of New Zealand (from 1920 to 1924); a senior Royal Navy officer | |
| Ulster | 31 March 1928 | Windsor | Extant | Subsidiary title of the Duke of Gloucester |
| Countess Cave of Richmond | 8 May 1928 | Cave | Extinct 7 January 1938 | Widow of George Cave, 1st Viscount Cave, a Conservative Party politician who served as Lord High Chancellor and Home Secretary and had died in office |
| Inchcape | 20 June 1929 | Mackay | Extant | Businessman and colonial administrator |
| Peel | 10 July 1929 | Peel | Extant | Conservative Party politician; former Secretary of State for India and First Commissioner of Works |
| Willingdon | 20 February 1931 | Freeman-Thomas | Extinct 19 March 1979 | Viceroy of India (from 1931 to 1936) and former Governor-General of Canada (from 1926 to 1931); created Marquess of Willingdon in 1936 |
| St Andrews | 12 October 1934 | Windsor | Extant | Subsidiary title of the Duke of Kent |
| Strathmore and Kinghorne | 1 June 1937 | Bowes-Lyon | Extant | Also Earl of Strathmore and Kinghorne in Scotland; father of Queen Elizabeth the Queen Mother |
| Bessborough | 2 June 1937 | Ponsonby | Extinct 5 December 1993 | Also Earl of Bessborough in Ireland, which title is extant; former Governor-General of Canada (from 1931 to 1935) |
| Baldwin of Bewdley | 8 June 1937 | Baldwin | Extant | Former Prime Minister (from 1923 to 1924, from 1924 to 1929 and from 1935 to 1937) |
| Halifax | 11 July 1944 | Wood | Extant | Former Viceroy of India (from 1926 to 1931), Foreign Secretary and British Ambassador to the United States |
| Earl Lloyd-George of Dwyfor | 1 January 1945 | Lloyd-George | Extant | Former Prime Minister (from 1916 to 1922) |
| Gowrie | 8 January 1945 | Ruthven | Extant | Former Governor-General of Australia (from 1936 to 1945) |
| Wavell | 1 May 1947 | Wavell | Extinct 24 December 1953 | Former Viceroy of India (from 1943 to 1947) and senior British Army officer |
| Mountbatten of Burma | 28 October 1947 | Mountbatten | Extant | Former Viceroy of India (in 1947) and senior Royal Navy officer |
| Merioneth | 20 November 1947 | Mountbatten | Merged in crown 8 September 2022 | Subsidiary title of the Duke of Edinburgh |
| Jowitt | 24 December 1951 | Jowitt | Extinct 16 August 1957 | Labour Party politician; Lord High Chancellor from 1945 to 1951 |
| Alexander of Tunis | 14 March 1952 | Alexander | Extant | Governor-General of Canada from 1946 to 1952, and senior British Army officer |
| Swinton | 5 May 1955 | Cunliffe-Lister | Extant | Conservative Party politician; former Secretary of State for Commonwealth Relations, for Air and for the Colonies, Chancellor of the Duchy of Lancaster and President of the Board of Trade |
| Attlee | 16 November 1955 | Attlee | Extant | Former Prime Minister (from 1945 to 1951) |
| Woolton | 9 January 1956 | Marquis | Extant | Conservative Party politician and businessman; Chairman of the Conservative Party from 1946 to 1955; Minister of Food and Minister of Reconstruction during the Second World War |
| Avon | 12 July 1961 | Eden | Extinct 17 August 1985 | Former Prime Minister (from 1955 to 1957) |
| Snowdon | 6 October 1961 | Armstrong-Jones | Extant | Former husband of Princess Margaret |
| Kilmuir | 20 July 1962 | Fyfe | Extinct 27 January 1967 | Conservative Party politician, lawyer and judge; Lord High Chancellor from 1954 to 1962 |
| Alexander of Hillsborough | 30 January 1963 | Alexander | Extinct 1965 | Labour Party politician; First Lord of the Admiralty during the Second World War and Minister of Defence from 1946 to 1950 |
| Stockton | 24 February 1984 | Macmillan | Extant | Former Prime Minister (from 1957 to 1963) |
| Inverness | 23 July 1986 | Mountbatten-Windsor | Extant | Subsidiary title of the Duke of York |
| Wessex | 19 June 1999 | Mountbatten-Windsor | Extant | Subsidiary title of the Duke of Edinburgh (dukedom is for life, earldoms and viscountcy hereditary) |
| Strathearn | 26 May 2011 | Mountbatten-Windsor | Extant | Subsidiary title of the Duke of Cambridge |
| Dumbarton | 19 May 2018 | Mountbatten-Windsor | Extant | Subsidiary title of the Duke of Sussex |
| Forfar | 10 March 2019 | Mountbatten-Windsor | Extant | Subsidiary title of the Duke of Edinburgh (dukedom is for life, earldoms and viscountcy hereditary) |

== See also ==
- British nobility
- List of earls in the peerages of Britain and Ireland
- List of the titled nobility of England and Ireland 1300–1309
