= Lord Bath =

Lord Bath may refer to:

- Earl of Bath, an extinct title in the peerages of England, Great Britain, and the United Kingdom
- Marquess of Bath, a title in the Peerage of Great Britain
