= List of the titled nobility of England and Ireland 1300–1309 =

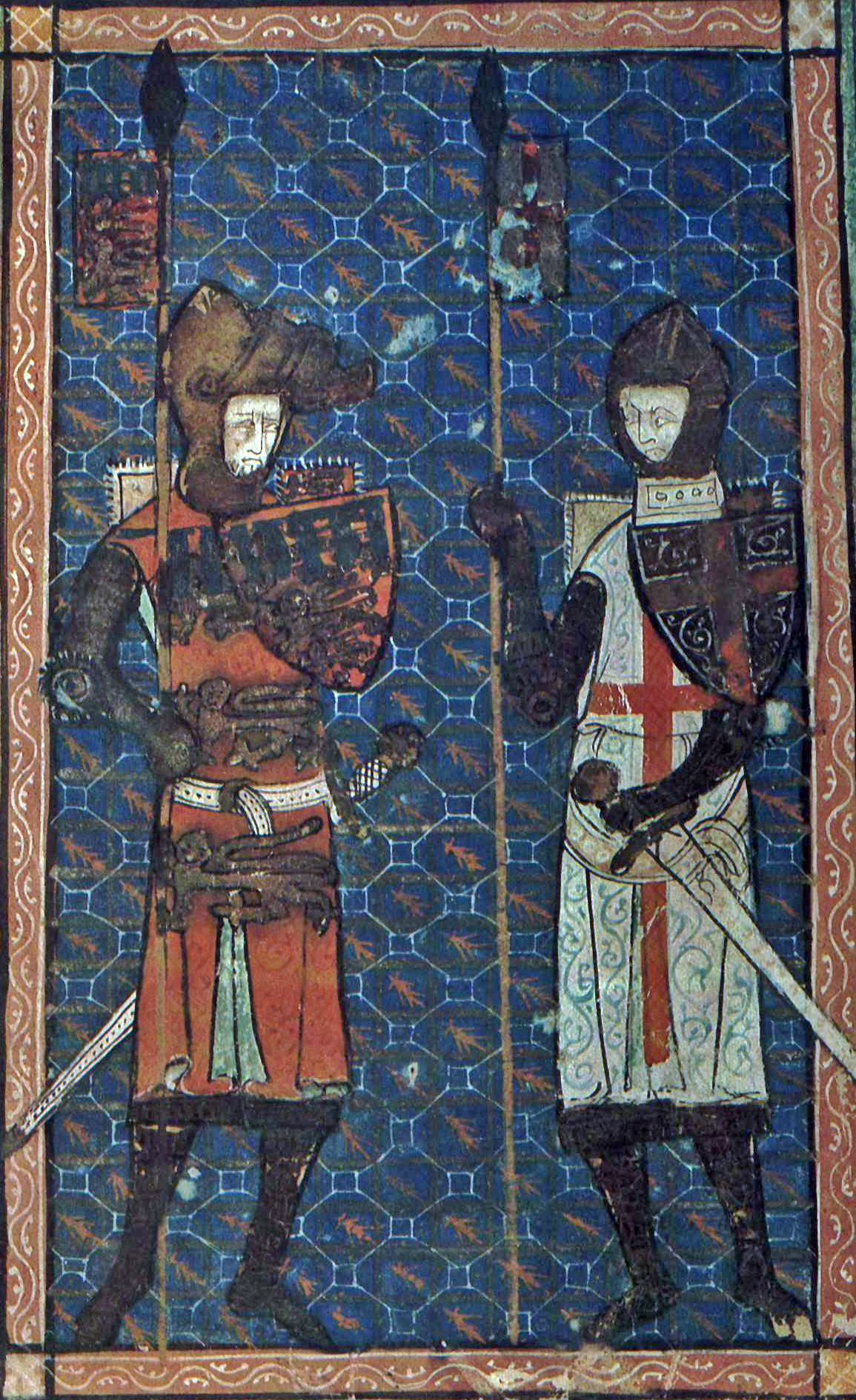
A manuscript painting showing an earl of Lancaster (l) with Saint George (r). The earl is probably Thomas of Lancaster, though he has also been identified as Thomas's father Edmund.

The titled nobility of England and Ireland consisted of one rank until 1337, namely that of earl. Edward I (1272–1307) led a restrictive policy on the creation of new earldoms, and at the end of his reign the number of earls was at eleven. The final years of the thirteenth century had seen a dramatic fall-off in the upper level of the nobility, as six earls had died from 1295 to 1298. The earldoms of Hereford and Essex, Hertford and Gloucester,^{[a]} Lancaster, Oxford and Warwick had been filled by 1300, while that of Pembroke had to wait until 1307. Aymer de Valence, 2nd Earl of Pembroke, whose father William died in 1296, did not succeed until his mother's death in 1307, since the earldom descended through the female line of the family. Another great generational change occurred in the years 1306–1307, when six new earls entered the peerage. In addition to Pembroke, the heirs of the earldoms of Arundel, Richmond and Surrey entered into their inheritance. Gilbert de Clare, 7th Earl of Hertford, whose father Gilbert de Clare, 6th Earl of Hertford had died in 1295, was allowed to enter into his patrimony in 1307, after it had been held by his stepfather Ralph de Monthermer, 1st Baron Monthermer for the life of Gilbert's mother. Finally, Piers Gaveston was in 1307 given the earldom of Cornwall, left vacant by the death of Edmund, 2nd Earl of Cornwall in 1300.

Of this group, the wealthiest and most powerful was Thomas, 2nd Earl of Lancaster. Thomas was the son of Edmund Crouchback, 1st Earl of Lancaster, who in turn was the son of King Henry III. This made Thomas the nephew of King Edward I, and the cousin of Edward's son Edward II (1307–1327). In addition to the earldom of Lancaster, Thomas was also earl of Leicester and Derby. He was also the son-in-law and heir of Henry de Lacy, 3rd Earl of Lincoln, and at Henry's death in 1311 he succeeded to the earldom of Lincoln as well. Thomas enjoyed a gross income of around £11,000 – far in excess of the second wealthiest earl, Guy de Beauchamp, 10th Earl of Warwick with about £6,000. At the other end of the scale was Robert de Vere, 6th Earl of Oxford, whose possessions were almost insufficient to uphold the honour of an earldom, but who still maintained his status based on his ancient lineage.

King Edward II had the advantage of a young and sympathetic nobility when he succeeded his father in 1307, and the troubles with which his reign was associated were not apparent at this point. These difficulties were largely caused by his appointment of Piers Gaveston to the earldom of Cornwall immediately after the accession. Gaveston was a relative upstart, and was seen as arrogant by the established nobility. He was considered to have far too much influence over the king, and had already been exiled once by Edward I. Matters were made worse by the fact that it was the earldom of Cornwall he was given, as this earldom had long been thought of as inalienable from the crown. Thomas of Lancaster gradually emerged as the leader of the opposition against the king, particularly after the death of the old and esteemed Henry de Lacy, who had up until then been a moderating force. Lancaster's closest associate was the earl of Warwick, who was even more fervent in his antagonism than Lancaster. Other earls, like Hertford and Pembroke, remained essentially loyal to the king.

== List of peers ==
Earldom	Name	Succeeded	Ended	Notes
Arundel	Richard FitzAlan, 8th Earl of Arundel	12 February 1291	9 March 1302	Great-great-grandson of the 3rd earl, William d'Aubigny, 3rd Earl of Arundel.^{[b]}
Arundel	Edmund FitzAlan, 9th Earl of Arundel	9 November 1306	17 November 1326	Executed and forfeit for treason.
Cornwall	Edmund, 2nd Earl of Cornwall	13 October 1272	24/25 September 1300	Died without issue.
Cornwall	Piers Gaveston, 1st Earl of Cornwall	6 August 1307	19 June 1312	Executed by the order of Thomas of Lancaster and others.
Hereford and Essex	Humphrey de Bohun, 4th Earl of Hereford	16 February 1298	16 March 1322	Surrendered his land briefly to the king before his wedding in 1302. Died in the Battle of Boroughbridge and forfeit.
Hertford and Gloucester	Ralph de Monthermer, 1st Baron Monthermer	12 November 1297	23 April 1307	Held earldom jure uxoris. Also earl of Atholl in Scotland.
Hertford and Gloucester	Gilbert de Clare, 7th Earl of Hertford	26 November 1307	24 June 1314	Died in the Battle of Bannockburn, no issue.
Lancaster, Leicester and Derby	Thomas, 2nd Earl of Lancaster	1 November 1297	22 March 1322	Executed and forfeit for treason.
Lincoln	Henry de Lacy, 3rd Earl of Lincoln	8 September 1298	5 February 1311	Died without male issue; heir son-in-law Thomas of Lancaster.
Norfolk	Roger Bigod, 5th Earl of Norfolk	25 July 1270	shortly bef. 6 December 1306	Nephew of Roger Bigod, 4th Earl of Norfolk. Died without issue.^{[c]}
Oxford	Robert de Vere, 6th Earl of Oxford	5 December 1296	17 April 1331	—
Pembroke	Aymer de Valence, 2nd Earl of Pembroke	6 November 1307	23 June 1324	Died without issue.
Richmond	John II, Duke of Brittany	28 January 1269	16/17 November 1305	—
Richmond	John of Brittany, Earl of Richmond	15 October 1306	17 January 1334	Succeeded in preference to his older brother Arthur II, Duke of Brittany. Died unmarried and was succeeded by his nephew John III, Duke of Brittany.
Surrey	John de Warenne, 6th Earl of Surrey	1252	c. 29 September 1304	—
Surrey	John de Warenne, 7th Earl of Surrey	7 April 1306	28/30 June 1347	Died without legitimate issue.
Ulster	Richard de Burgh, 2nd Earl of Ulster	6 January 1280	29 June 1326	—
Warwick	Guy de Beauchamp, 10th Earl of Warwick	5 September 1298	12 August 1315	—

== See also ==
- List of earldoms

== Notes ==
b. The title had been dormant since the death without issue of Hugh d'Aubigny, 5th Earl of Arundel in 1243, and though Richard's father John FitzAlan, lord of Arundel is sometimes styled earl of Arundel in the literature, he never used this title. Richard FitzAlan was the first of the FitzAlan family to be styled earl of Arundel by contemporaries.

c. In 1302 Roger granted his lands to the king, and received them back for life. Hence – at his death – his lands and title reverted to the crown.

== Bibliography ==
- Altschul, Michael (1965). A Baronial Family in Medieval England: The Clares 1217–1314. Baltimore: Johns Hopkins Press.
- Chaplais, Pierre (1994). Piers Gaveston: Edward II's Adoptive Brother. Oxford: Clarendon. ISBN 0-19-820449-3.
- Cokayne, George (1910–1959). The Complete Peerage of England, Scotland, Ireland, Great Britain and the United Kingdom (New ed.). London: The St. Catherine Press.
- Fryde, E. B. (1961). Handbook of British Chronology (Second ed.). London: Royal Historical Society.
- Given-Wilson, Chris (1996). The English Nobility in the Late Middle Ages. London: Routledge. ISBN 0-415-14883-9.
- McFarlane, K. B. (1980). The Nobility of Later Medieval England. Oxford: Clarendon. ISBN 0-19-822657-8.
- McKisack, May (1959). The Fourteenth Century: 1307–1399. Oxford: Oxford University Press. ISBN 0-19-821712-9.
- Maddicott, J. R. (1970). Thomas of Lancaster, 1307–1322: A Study in the Reign of Edward II. Oxford: Oxford University Press. ISBN 0-19-821837-0.
- Phillips, J.R.S. (1972). Aymer de Valence, Earl of Pembroke 1307-1324. Oxford: Oxford University Press. ISBN 0-19-822359-5.
- Powicke, F. M. (1962). The Thirteenth Century: 1216–1307 (2nd ed.). Oxford: Clarendon Press.
- Prestwich, Michael (1997). Edward I (updated ed.). New Haven: Yale University Press. ISBN 0-300-07209-0.
- Prestwich, Michael (2007). Plantagenet England: 1225-1360 (new ed.). Oxford: Oxford University Press. ISBN 978-0-19-822844-8.
- Tuck, Anthony (1985). Crown and Nobility 1272–1461: Political Conflict in Late Medieval England. London: Fontana. ISBN 0-00-686084-2.
