= Philibert de Chandée, 1st Earl of Bath =

French noble and Earl in the English peerage

Philibert de Chandée, 1st Earl of Bath (died after 1486 in Brittany, France) was a noble from Brittany who became an Earl in the English peerage.

He entertained Henry Tudor, then Earl of Richmond, and later King Henry VII during his banishment in Brittany, and was made Commander of the French auxiliaries to the troops commanded by Henry when he went to invade England and challenge Richard III for the crown. Chandée was knighted on landing at Milford Haven. At the Battle of Bosworth, Chandée led 1,800 French mercenaries who formed the core of Henry's army. During the battle, Richard III led an impromptu cavalry charge deep into the enemy ranks in an attempt to end the battle quickly by striking at Henry Tudor himself, and it was only a complex tactical move taught by only the Swiss forces at the time, along with help from Thomas Stanley's intervention which saved Henry and killed Richard III.

Chandée was one of the few who received a peerage from Henry VII, being created Earl of Bath, either on 16 October 1485, the day before the coronation, at the Tower of London, or on 6 January 1486.

Nothing is known of him after he was created an Earl.
