= Earl of Bath =

Earldom in the Peerage of Great Britain

Earldom of Bath
- Creation date: 1486
- Created by: Henry VII (first creation)
- Peerage: Peerage of England; Peerage of Great Britain; Peerage of the United Kingdom
- First holder: Philibert de Chandée (first creation)
- Last holder: Laura Pulteney, 1st Countess of Bath (fifth creation)
- Subsidiary titles: Viscount Lansdown
- Extinction date: 1808

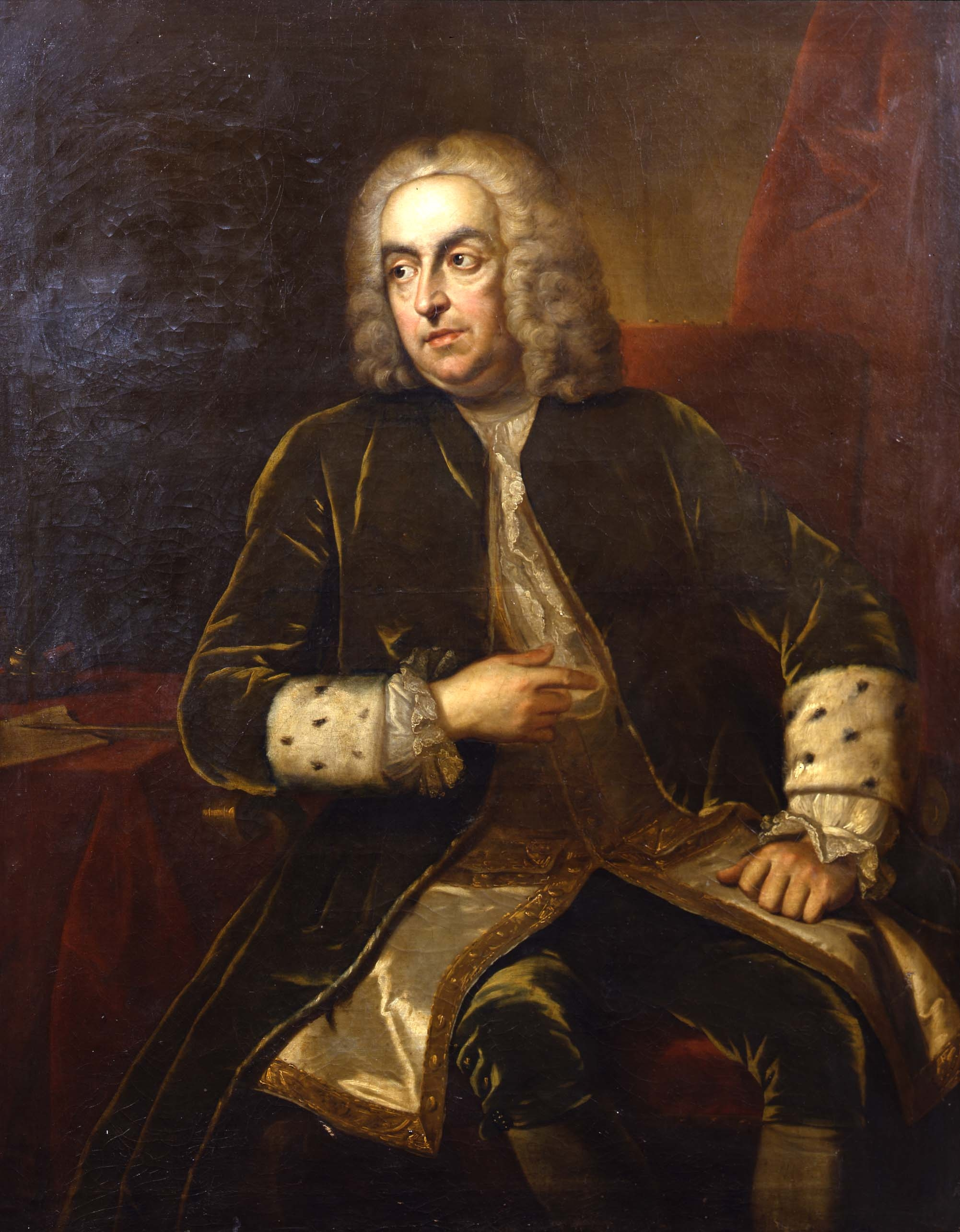
William Pulteney, 1st Earl of Bath, (fourth creation), in the 1740s.

Earl of Bath was a title that was created five times in British history, three times in the Peerage of England, once in the Peerage of Great Britain and once in the Peerage of the United Kingdom. It is now extinct.

== Earls of Bath; First creation (1486) ==
- Philibert de Chandée, 1st Earl of Bath (d. aft. 1486)

== Earls of Bath; Second creation (1536) ==
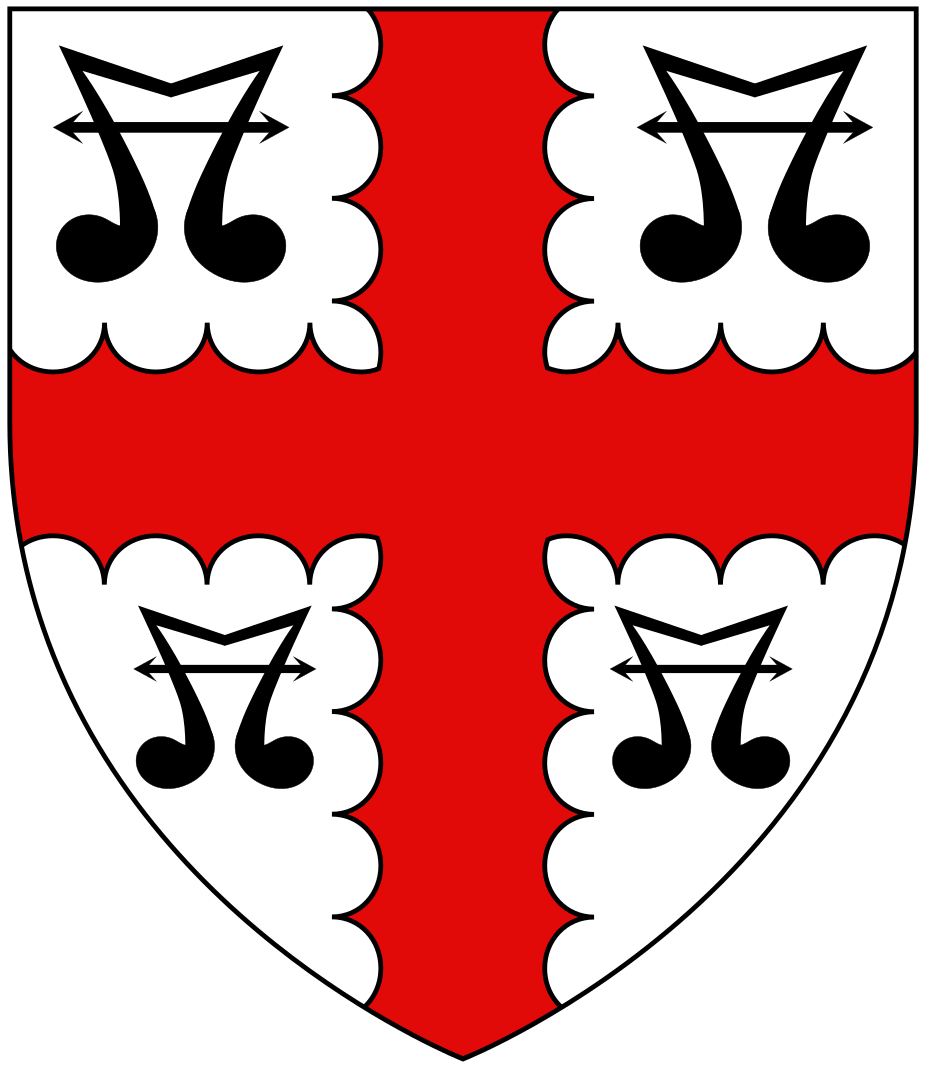
Arms of Bourchier, Earls of Bath: Argent, a cross engrailed gules between four water bougets sable. Badge: Bourchier knot

- John Bourchier, 1st Earl of Bath (1470–1539)
- John Bourchier, 2nd Earl of Bath (1499–1561), son.
- William Bourchier, 3rd Earl of Bath (bef. 1557–1623), grandson.
- Edward Bourchier, 4th Earl of Bath (1590–1636), son.
- Henry Bourchier, 5th Earl of Bath (1593–1654), first cousin once removed.

== Earls of Bath; Third creation (1661) ==
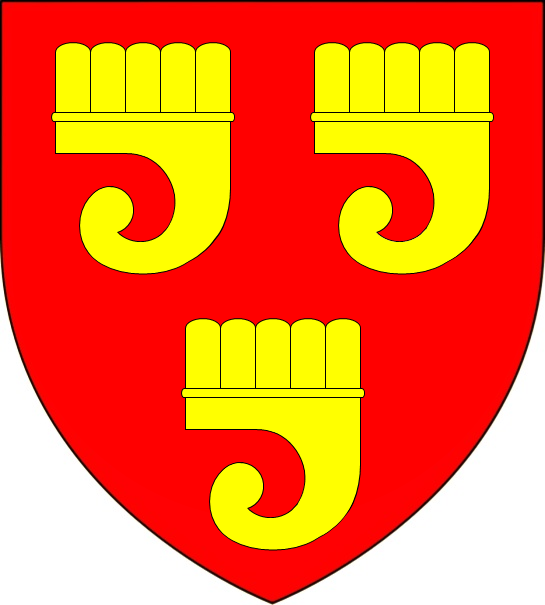
Arms of Granville, Earls of Bath: Gules, three clarions or

- John Granville, 1st Earl of Bath (1628–1701)
- Charles Granville, 2nd Earl of Bath (1661–1701), son.
- William Granville, 3rd Earl of Bath (1692–1711), son.

== Jacobite creations ==
George Granville, 1st Baron Lansdowne had been created a baron by Queen Anne on 1 January 1712. On 6 October 1721 the Jacobite Old Pretender "James III", who refused to recognise his peerage "Baron Lansdown" bestowed by Queen Anne, created him "Lord of Lansdown"," Viscount [ ]" and "Earl of Bath" in the Jacobite Peerage of England, with remainder to his heirs male. On 3 November 1721 James created him "Duke of Albemarle", "Marquis Monck and Fitzhemmon", "Earl of Bath", "Viscount Bevil", and "Baron Lansdown of Bideford" in the Jacobite Peerage of England, with remainder to the heirs male of his body, who failing to his brother, Bernard Granville, and the heirs male of his body. George died on 29 January 1735 and left no male progeny, and thus at his death the Barony of Lansdowne became extinct. His Jacobite titles, such as they were, were inherited by his nephew Bernard Granville, son of his brother Bernard. The younger Bernard died in 1776, when the Jacobite peerages created on 3 November 1721 became extinct, while those created on 6 October 1721 passed to his heir male.

== Earls of Bath; Fourth creation (1742) ==
Arms of Pulteney: Argent, a fess dancettée gules in chief three leopard's faces sable

- William Pulteney, 1st Earl of Bath (1684–1764)
  - William Pulteney, Viscount Pulteney (1731–1763)

== Earls of Bath; Fifth creation (1803) ==
- (Henrietta) Laura Pulteney, 1st Countess of Bath (1766–1808)

== See also ==
- Marquess of Bath
