= Duke of Edinburgh =

Dukedom in the Peerage of the United Kingdom

Dukedom of Edinburgh
- Arms of Prince Edward, Duke of Edinburgh
- Creation date: 10 March 2023 (announced); 3 April 2023 (Letters Patent)
- Creation: Fourth
- Created by: Charles III
- Peerage: Peerage of the United Kingdom
- First holder: Prince Frederick (first creation; 1726)
- Present holder: Prince Edward
- Subsidiary titles: Earl of Wessex; Earl of Forfar; Viscount Severn
- Status: Extant

Duke of Edinburgh, named after the capital city of Scotland, Edinburgh, is a substantive title that has been created four times since 1726 for members of the British royal family. It does not include any territorial landholdings and does not produce any revenue for the title-holder.

The current holder, Prince Edward, was created duke in 2023 on his 59th birthday by his eldest brother, King Charles III. The dukedom had previously been granted to their father, then Philip Mountbatten, on the day of his marriage to Princess Elizabeth, the future Queen Elizabeth II. Upon Philip's death, the title was inherited by Charles and held by him until Elizabeth died and Charles became king, at which time the title reverted to the Crown.

== 1726 creation ==
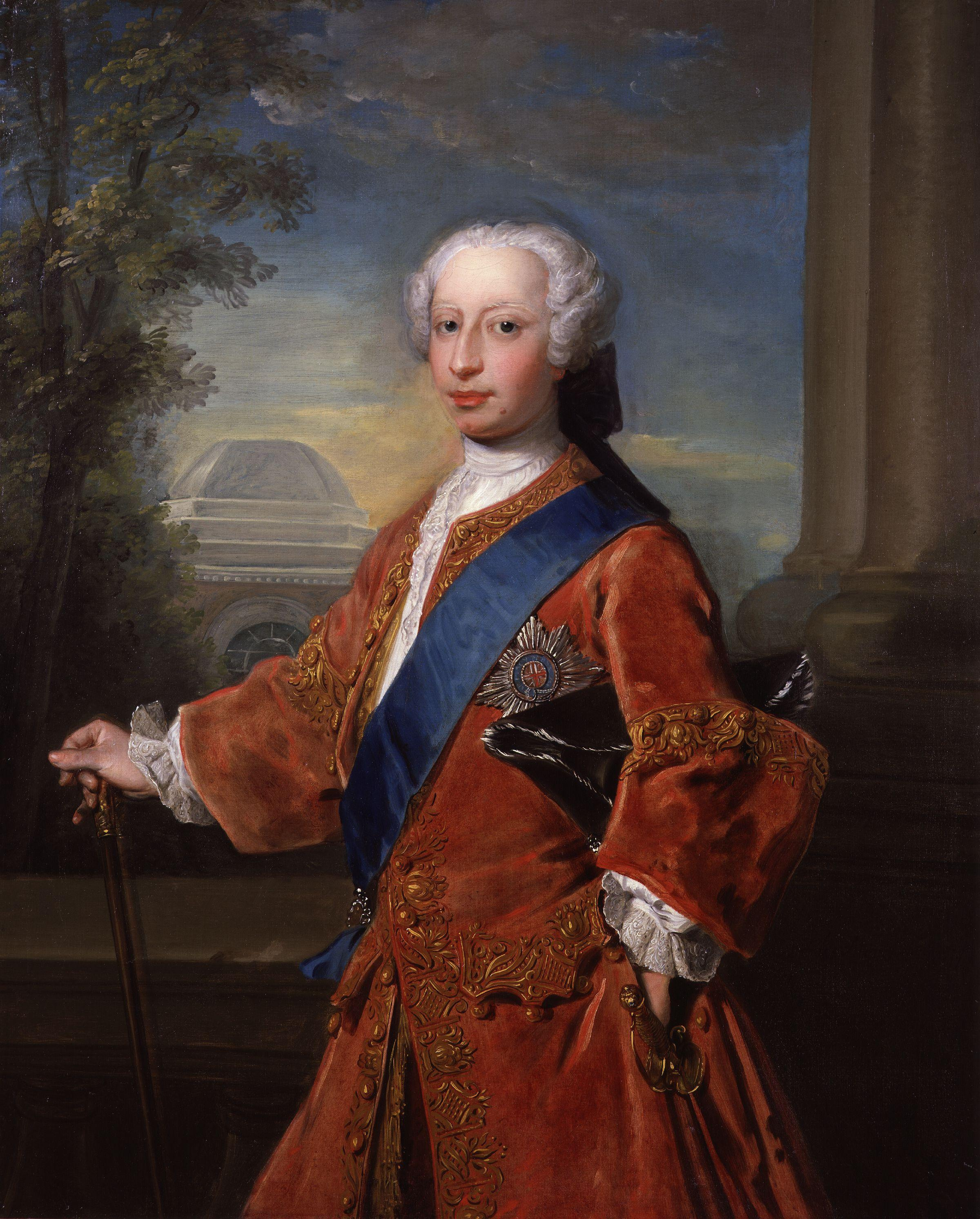
Frederick, Prince of Wales (1707–1751) was the first Duke of Edinburgh, from 1726 until his death.

The title was first created in the Peerage of Great Britain on 26 July 1726 by King George I, who bestowed it on his grandson, Prince Frederick, who subsequently became Prince of Wales in 1728. The subsidiary titles of the dukedom were Marquess of the Isle of Ely; Earl of Eltham, in the County of Kent; Viscount of Launceston, in the County of Cornwall; and Baron of Snowdon, in the County of Caernarvon, all of which were also in the Peerage of Great Britain. The marquessate was gazetted as Marquess of the Isle of Wight, apparently erroneously. In later editions of The London Gazette the Duke is referred to as the Marquess of the Isle of Ely. Upon Frederick's death, the titles were inherited by his son Prince George. When Prince George became King George III in 1760, the titles merged in the Crown and ceased to exist.

== 1866 creation ==
On 24 May 1866, Queen Victoria re-created the dukedom, this time in the Peerage of the United Kingdom for her second son, Prince Alfred (traditionally, the second son of the monarch is awarded the title Duke of York). The subsidiary titles of the dukedom were Earl of Kent and Earl of Ulster, also in the Peerage of the United Kingdom. When Alfred became the Duke of Saxe-Coburg and Gotha in 1893, he retained his British titles. His only son who survived birth, Alfred, died by suicide in 1899, so the Dukedom of Edinburgh and its subsidiary titles became extinct upon the elder Alfred's death in 1900.

== 1947 creation ==
The title was created for a third time on 19 November 1947 by King George VI, who bestowed it on his future son-in-law Philip Mountbatten, shortly before he married Princess Elizabeth. Subsequently, Elizabeth was styled "HRH The Princess Elizabeth, Duchess of Edinburgh" until her accession in 1952. The subsidiary titles of the dukedom were Earl of Merioneth and Baron Greenwich, of Greenwich in the County of London; all these titles were in the Peerage of the United Kingdom. Earlier that year, Philip had renounced his Greek and Danish royal titles (he was born a prince of Greece and Denmark, being a male-line grandson of King George I of Greece and male-line great-grandson of King Christian IX of Denmark) along with his rights to the Greek throne. In 1957, Philip became a prince of the United Kingdom.

Upon Philip's death on 9 April 2021, his eldest son, Charles, Prince of Wales, succeeded to all of his hereditary titles. Upon Charles's accession to the throne on 8 September 2022, the peerages merged in the Crown and ceased to exist.

== 2023 creation ==
It was announced in 1999, at the time of his wedding, that Prince Edward would eventually be granted the Dukedom of Edinburgh. The idea came from Prince Philip, who unexpectedly conveyed his wish to Edward and his fiancée, Sophie Rhys-Jones, only days before their wedding. Edward, then seventh in the line of succession to the British throne, had expected the dukedom to be granted to Prince Andrew, his older brother.

Prince Philip died in April 2021. His dukedom was automatically inherited by his eldest son, Prince Charles, before it merged in the Crown when Charles became king. Edward, who had by then dropped to the 14th place in the line of succession because of births of those higher in line, said in June that his being granted such a prestigious title was "a pipe dream of my father's". In July, The Times reported that Charles had decided not to give the title to his brother. Clarence House did not deny the reports, which were met with disapproval by commentators in light of Edward and Sophie's increased role in the monarchy after Andrew withdrew from public life and Charles's son Prince Harry and daughter-in-law Meghan quit royal duties.

It was suggested in November 2022, shortly after Charles III ascended the throne, that Buckingham Palace was considering saving the dukedom for the new king's granddaughter Princess Charlotte of Wales in recognition of her high place in the line of succession and her being the first female member of the royal family whose place in the line of succession cannot be superseded by a younger brother.

The dukedom was bestowed on Prince Edward on the occasion of his 59th birthday on 10 March 2023. This fourth creation of the title is a life peerage, meaning that Edward's son, James, will not inherit the dukedom (unlike Edward's other peerages). This allows Charles to honour his father's wish and reward his brother and sister-in-law while making it possible for Charles's heir apparent, Prince William, to confer it on one of his children. According to Camilla Tominey of The Daily Telegraph, there had been concerns about the effect that "giv(ing) the Edinburgh dukedom to someone descending fast down the royal ranking" would have on the Scottish independence debate. She proposes that "the prospect of Scottish independence now looking less likely" in the light of Nicola Sturgeon's resignation made the conferral less of a risk.

== Dukes of Edinburgh ==
=== First creation, 1726 ===
Also: Marquess of the Isle of Ely, Earl of Eltham, Viscount Launceston and Baron Snowdon.

Duke	Portrait	Birth	Marriage(s)	Death	Arms
Prince Frederick; House of Hanover; 1726–1751 also: Prince of Wales (1728), Duke of Cornwall (1727, created 1337), Duke of Rothesay (1727, created 1469)	Prince Frederick	1 February 1707; Leineschloss, Hanover Son of King George II and Queen Caroline	Princess Augusta of Saxe-Gotha; 17 April 1736; 9 children	31 March 1751; Leicester House, Leicester Square, London aged 44	
Prince George; House of Hanover; 1751–1760 also: Prince of Wales (1751)	Prince George	4 June 1738; Norfolk House, London Son of Prince Frederick and Princess Augusta	Princess Charlotte of Mecklenburg-Strelitz; 8 September 1761; 15 children	29 January 1820; Windsor Castle, Windsor aged 81	

The dukedom and subsidiary titles merged in the Crown in 1760 upon Prince George's succession to the monarchy.

=== Second creation, 1866 ===
Also: Earl of Kent and Earl of Ulster.

Duke	Portrait	Birth	Marriage(s)	Death	Arms
Prince Alfred; House of Saxe-Coburg and Gotha; 1866–1900 also Duke of Saxe-Coburg and Gotha (1893)	Prince Alfred	6 August 1844; Windsor Castle, Windsor Son of Queen Victoria and Prince Albert	Grand Duchess Maria Alexandrovna of Russia; 23 January 1874; 6 children	30 July 1900; Schloss Rosenau, Coburg aged 55	

The dukedom and subsidiary titles became extinct in 1900 upon Prince Alfred's death because his only son predeceased him.

=== Third creation, 1947 ===
Also: Earl of Merioneth and Baron Greenwich.

Duke	Portrait	Birth	Marriage(s)	Death	Arms
Prince Philip; Mountbatten family/ House of Glücksburg (by birth); 1947–2021	Prince Philip	10 June 1921; Mon Repos, Corfu Son of Prince Andrew of Greece and Denmark and Princess Alice of Battenberg	Princess Elizabeth; 20 November 1947; 4 children	9 April 2021; Windsor Castle, Windsor aged 99	
Prince Charles; House of Windsor; 2021–2022 also: Prince of Wales (1958), Duke of Cornwall (1952, created 1337), Duke of Rothesay (1952, created 1469)	Prince Charles	14 November 1948; Buckingham Palace, London Son of Prince Philip and Queen Elizabeth II	Lady Diana Spencer; 29 July 1981; 2 children Divorced 28 August 1996	Living	
Prince Charles; House of Windsor; 2021–2022 also: Prince of Wales (1958), Duke of Cornwall (1952, created 1337), Duke of Rothesay (1952, created 1469)	Prince Charles	14 November 1948; Buckingham Palace, London Son of Prince Philip and Queen Elizabeth II	Camilla Parker Bowles; 9 April 2005; No issue	Living	

The dukedom and subsidiary titles merged in the Crown in 2022 upon Prince Charles's succession to the monarchy.

=== Fourth creation, 2023 ===
Duke	Portrait	Birth	Marriage(s)	Death	Arms
Prince Edward; House of Windsor; 2023–present also: Earl of Wessex (1999), Earl of Forfar (2019), Viscount Severn (1999)	Prince Edward	10 March 1964; Buckingham Palace, London Son of Prince Philip and Queen Elizabeth II	Sophie Rhys-Jones; 19 June 1999; 2 children	Living	

The dukedom will be held for Prince Edward's lifetime as a life peerage.

== Family trees ==
Family tree of the Dukes of Gloucester, Dukes of Edinburgh, the Dukes of Gloucester and Edinburgh, the Marquesses of Carisbrooke, and the Earls of Ulster (UK creations)

Edward III of England; 1312–1377
Duke of Gloucester (1st creation), 1385
John of Gaunt; 1340–1399; Duke of Lancaster	Thomas of Woodstock; 1355–1397; Duke of Gloucester
Dukedom of Gloucester (1st creation) extinct, 1397
Henry IV of England; 1367–1413	John Beaufort; 1373–1410; 1st Earl of Somerset	Joan Beaufort c. 1379–1440
Duke of Gloucester (2nd creation), 1414
Humphrey of Lancaster; 1390–1447; Duke of Gloucester	John Beaufort; 1404–1444; Duke of Somerset	Cecily Neville; 1415–1495
Dukedom of Gloucester (2nd creation) extinct, 1447
Duke of Gloucester (3rd creation), 1461
Margaret Beaufort; 1443–1509	Edward IV of England; 1442–1483	Richard of York; 1452–1485; Duke of Gloucester; Later Richard III of England
Dukedom of Gloucester (3rd creation) merged in the Crown, 1483
Henry VII of England; 1457–1509	Elizabeth of York; 1466–1503
Margaret Tudor; 1489–1541	Henry VIII of England; 1491–1547
James V of Scotland; 1512–1542
Mary, Queen of Scots; 1542–1587
James VI & I of Scotland and England; 1566–1625
Princess Elizabeth Stuart; 1596–1662	Charles I of Scotland and England; 1600–1649
Duke of Gloucester (4th creation), 1659
Sophia of Hanover; 1630–1714	James II of Scotland and England; 1633–1701	Prince Henry; 1640–1660; Duke of Gloucester
Dukedom of Gloucester (4th creation) extinct, 1660
George I of Great Britain; 1660–1727	Anne of Great Britain; 1665–1714
George II of Great Britain; 1683–1760	Prince William; 1689–1700 styled Duke of Gloucester
Duke of Edinburgh (1st creation), Marquess of the Isle of Ely, Earl of Eltham (1st creation), Viscount Launceston, and Baron Snowdon, 1726
Prince Frederick Louis; 1707–1751; 1st Duke of Edinburgh, etc., styled Duke of Gloucester until created Duke of Edinburgh, 1726
Duke of Gloucester and Edinburgh, 1764
Prince George William Frederick; 1738–1820; 2nd Duke of Edinburgh, etc. Later George III of Great Britain, later the United Kingdom	Prince William Henry; 1743–1805; 1st Duke of Gloucester and Edinburgh
Dukedom of Edinburgh (1st creation) and subsidiary titles merged in the Crown, 1760	Dukedom of Gloucester and Edinburgh unused, 1805–1816
William IV of the United Kingdom; 1765–1837	Prince Edward; 1767–1820; Duke of Kent and Strathearn	Princess Mary; 1776–1857	Prince William Frederick; 1776–1834; 2nd Duke of Gloucester and Edinburgh
Dukedom of Gloucester and Edinburgh extinct, 1834
Queen Victoria of the United Kingdom; 1819–1901
Duke of Edinburgh (2nd creation) and Earl of Ulster (UK, 1st creation), 1866
Princess Alice; 1843–1878	Edward VII of the United Kingdom; 1841–1910	Prince Alfred Ernest Albert; 1844–1900; Duke of Saxe-Coburg and Gotha, Duke of Edinburgh, etc.	Princess Beatrice; 1857–1944
Dukedom of Edinburgh (2nd creation) and subsidiary title extinct, 1900
Marquess of Carisbrooke, Earl of Berkhampstead, Viscount Launceston, 1917
Princess Victoria of Hesse and by Rhine; 1863–1950	George V of the United Kingdom; 1865–1936	Alexander Albert Mountbatten; 1886–1960; Marquess of Carisbrooke, etc.
Marquessate of Carisbrooke and subsidiary titles extinct, 1960
Duke of Gloucester (5th creation), Earl of Ulster (UK, 2nd creation), Baron Culloden (2nd creation), 1928
Princess Alice of Battenberg; 1885–1969	George VI of the United Kingdom; 1895–1952	Prince Henry; 1900–1974; 1st Duke of Gloucester, etc.
Duke of Edinburgh (3rd creation), 1947
Prince Philip; 1921–2021; 1st Duke of Edinburgh	Elizabeth II of the United Kingdom; 1926–2022
Duke of Edinburgh (4th creation), 2023
Prince Charles b. 1948; 2nd Duke of Edinburgh; Later Charles III of the United Kingdom	Prince Edward b. 1964; Duke of Edinburgh, Earl of Wessex, Earl of Forfar, and Viscount Severn	Prince Richard b. 1944; 2nd Duke of Gloucester, etc.
Dukedom of Edinburgh (3rd creation) merged in the Crown, 2022	Dukedom of Edinburgh (4th creation) is a life peerage and therefore not hereditary
Alexander Windsor b. 1974 styled Earl of Ulster
Heir-apparent to the Dukedom of Gloucester
Xan Windsor b. 2007 styled Baron Culloden

Family tree of British royal dukes

Includes dukes of: Albany, Albemarle, Bedford, Cambridge, Clarence, Connaught and Strathearn, Cumberland, Edinburgh, Gloucester, Gloucester and Edinburgh, Hereford, Kent, Kintyre and Lorne, Norfolk, Ross, Somerset, Sussex, Windsor, and York, but only when royally.

Non-royal dukes are not included; see Royal dukedoms in the United Kingdom.
Also not included are titles mandated for use by the heir apparent (Duke of Rothesay and the 1337 creation of the Duke of Cornwall), see Princes of Wales family tree.

King Robert II; 1316–1390	King Edward III; 1312–1377
Duke of Albany (1st creation), 1398	Duke of Clarence (1st creation), 1362	Duke of York (1st creation), 1385
King Robert III c. 1337–1406	Robert Stewart c. 1340–1420; 1st Duke of Albany	Edward the Black Prince; 1330–1376	Lionel of Antwerp; 1338–1368; Duke of Clarence	John of Gaunt; 1340–1399	Edmund; 1341–1402; 1st Duke of York
Dukedom of Clarence (1st creation) extinct, 1368
Duke of Cornwall (2nd creation), 1376	Duke of Hereford, 1397	Duke of Gloucester (1st creation), 1385
Murdoch Stewart c. 1362–1425; 2nd Duke of Albany	Richard of Bordeaux; 1367–1400; Duke of Cornwall, later King Richard II	Henry Bolingbroke; 1367–1413; Duke of Hereford, later King Henry IV	Thomas of Woodstock; 1355–1397; Duke of Gloucester
Dukedom of Albany (1st creation) forfeit, 1425	Dukedom of Cornwall (2nd creation) merged in the crown, 1377	Dukedom of Hereford merged in the crown, 1399	Dukedom of Gloucester (1st creation) extinct, 1397
Duke of Clarence (2nd creation), 1412	Duke of Bedford (1st & 2nd creations), 1414	Duke of Gloucester (2nd creation), 1414	Duke of Albemarle (Aumale) (1st creation), 1397
Thomas of Lancaster; 1387–1421; Duke of Clarence	John of Lancaster; 1389–1435; Duke of Bedford; Surrendered dukedom and then regranted, 1433	Humphrey of Lancaster; 1390–1447; Duke of Gloucester	John Beaufort; 1373–1410	Joan Beaufort c. 1379–1440	Edward of Norwich c. 1373–1415; Duke of Aumale, 2nd Duke of York	Richard of Conisburgh; 1385–1415
Dukedom of Clarence (2nd creation) extinct, 1421	Dukedom of Bedford (2nd creation) extinct, 1435	Dukedom of Gloucester (2nd creation) extinct, 1447	Dukedom of Albemarle (Aumale) (1st creation) forfeit, 1399
Duke of York (1st creation) restored, 1425; Duke of Cornwall (3rd creation), 1460
King James I 1394–1437	Joan Beaufort c. 1404–1445	Owen Tudor c. 1400–1461	John Beaufort; 1404–1444	Richard Neville; 1400–1460	Cecily Neville; 1415–1495	Richard of York; 1411–1460; 3rd Duke of York, Duke of Cornwall
Duke of Cornwall (3rd creation) extinct, 1460
Duke of Bedford (5th creation), 1485	Duke of Clarence (3rd creation), 1461	Duke of Gloucester (3rd creation), 1461
King James II; 1430–1460	Jasper Tudor c. 1431–1495; Duke of Bedford	Edmund Tudor c. 1430–1456	Lady Margaret Beaufort; 1443–1509	John Neville c. 1431–1471	Elizabeth Woodville c. 1437–1492	Edward; 1442–1483; 4th Duke of York, later King Edward IV	George Plantagenet; 1449–1478; Duke of Clarence	Richard of York; 1452–1485; Duke of Gloucester, later King Richard III
Dukedom of Bedford (5th creation) extinct, 1495	Dukedom of York (1st creation) merged in the Crown, 1461	Dukedom of Clarence (3rd creation) forfeit, 1478	Dukedom of Gloucester (3rd creation) merged in the Crown, 1483
Duke of Albany (2nd creation), 1458	Duke of Bedford (3rd creation), 1470	Duke of York (2nd creation), 1474; Duke of Norfolk (3rd creation), 1477	Duke of Bedford (4th creation), 1478
Alexander Stewart c. 1454–1485; 1st Duke of Albany	King James III; 1451/1452–1488	George Neville; 1457–1483; Duke of Bedford	King Henry VII; 1457–1509	Elizabeth of York; 1466–1503	Richard of Shrewsbury; 1473–1483; Duke of York, Duke of Norfolk	George of York; 1477–1479; Duke of Bedford
Dukedom of Bedford (3rd creation) forfeit, 1478	Dukedom of York (2nd creation) and Dukedom of Norfolk (3rd creation) extinct, 1483	Dukedom of Bedford (4th creation) extinct, 1479
Duke of Ross (1st creation), 1488	Duke of York (3rd creation), 1494	Duke of Somerset (3rd creation), 1499
John Stewart; 1482–1536; 2nd Duke of Albany	James Stewart; 1476–1504; Duke of Ross	King James IV; 1473–1513	Margaret Tudor; 1489–1541	Henry; 1491–1547; Duke of York, later King Henry VIII	Edmund Tudor; 1499–1500; Duke of Somerset (nominated but probably not invested)
Dukedom of Albany (2nd creation) extinct, 1536	Dukedom of Ross (1st creation) extinct, 1504	Dukedom of York (3rd creation) merged in the Crown, 1509	Dukedom of Somerset (3rd creation) extinct, 1500
Duke of Ross (2nd creation), 1514
King James V 1512–1542	Alexander Stewart; 1514–1515; Duke of Ross
Duke of Albany (3rd creation), 1565	Dukedom of Ross (2nd creation) extinct, 1515
Henry Stuart; 1546–1567; 1st Duke of Albany	Queen Mary; 1542–1587
James; 1566–1625; 2nd Duke of Albany, later King James VI & I
Dukedom of Albany (3rd creation) merged in the Crown, 1567
Duke of Albany (4th creation), 1604; Duke of York (4th creation), 1605	Duke of Kintyre and Lorne, 1602
Elizabeth Stuart; 1596–1662	Henry Frederick; 1594–1612	Charles; 1600–1649; Duke of Albany, Duke of York, later King Charles I	Robert Stuart; 1602; Duke of Kintyre and Lorne
Dukedom of Albany (4th creation), Dukedom of York (4th creation) merged in the Crown, 1625	Dukedom of Kintyre and Lorne extinct, 1602
Duke of York (5th creation) 1644; Duke of Albany (5th creation), 1660	Duke of Gloucester (4th creation), 1659
Sophia of Hanover; 1630–1714	James Stuart; 1633–1701; Duke of York, Duke of Albany, later King James VII & II	Henry; 1640–1660; Duke of Gloucester
Dukedom of Albany (5th creation) and Dukedom of York (5th creation) merged in the Crown, 1685	Dukedom of Gloucester (4th creation) extinct, 1660
Duke of York and Albany (1st creation), 1716	Duke of Cambridge (1st creation), 1664	Duke of Kendal (1st creation), 1666	Duke of Cambridge (2nd creation), 1667
King George I 1660–1727	Ernest Augustus; 1674–1728; Duke of York and Albany	Charles Stuart; 1660–1661 styled Duke of Cambridge	James Stuart; 1663–1667; Duke of Cambridge	Queen Anne; 1665–1714	Charles Stuart; 1666–1667 designated Duke of Kendal	Edgar Stuart; 1667–1671; Duke of Cambridge	Charles Stuart; 1677 styled Duke of Cambridge
Dukedom of York and Albany (1st creation) extinct, 1728	Dukedom of Cambridge (1st creation) extinct, 1667	Dukedom of Kendal (1st creation), extinct, 1667	Dukedom of Cambridge (2nd creation) extinct, 1671
Duke of Cambridge (3rd creation)
George; 1683–1760; Duke of Cambridge, later King George II	William; 1689–1700 styled Duke of Gloucester
Dukedom of Cambridge (3rd creation) merged with the Crown, 1727
Duke of Edinburgh (1st creation), 1726	Duke of Cumberland (3rd creation), 1726
Frederick; 1707–1751; 1st Duke of Edinburgh, styled Duke of Gloucester until created Duke of Edinburgh	William Augustus; 1721–1765; Duke of Cumberland
Dukedom of Cumberland (3rd creation) extinct, 1765
Duke of York and Albany (2nd creation), 1760	Duke of Gloucester and Edinburgh, 1764	Duke of Cumberland and Strathearn, 1766
George; 1738–1820; 2nd Duke of Edinburgh, later King George III	Edward; 1739–1767; Duke of York and Albany	William Henry; 1743–1805; 1st Duke of Gloucester and Edinburgh	Henry; 1745–1790; Duke of Cumberland and Strathearn
Dukedom of Edinburgh (1st creation), merged in the Crown, 1760	Dukedom of York and Albany (2nd creation) extinct, 1767	Dukedom of Cumberland and Strathearn extinct, 1790
Duke of York and Albany (3rd creation), 1784	Duke of Clarence and St Andrews, 1789	Duke of Kent and Strathearn, 1799	Duke of Cumberland and Teviotdale, 1799	Duke of Sussex (1st creation), 1801	Duke of Cambridge (4th creation), 1801
Frederick; 1763–1827; Duke of York and Albany	William Henry; 1765–1837, Duke of Clarence and St Andrews, later King William IV	Edward; 1767–1820; Duke of Kent and Strathearn	Ernest Augustus; 1771–1851; King of Hanover, 1st Duke of Cumberland and Teviotdale	Augustus Frederick; 1773–1843; Duke of Sussex	Adolphus; 1774–1850; 1st Duke of Cambridge	Mary; 1776–1857	William Frederick; 1776–1834; 2nd Duke of Gloucester and Edinburgh
Dukedom of York and Albany (3rd creation) extinct, 1827	Dukedom of Clarence and St Andrews merged in the Crown, 1830	Dukedom of Kent and Strathearn extinct, 1820	Dukedom of Sussex (1st creation) extinct, 1843	Dukedom of Gloucester and Edinburgh extinct, 1834
Queen Victoria; 1819–1901	George V 1819–1878; King of Hanover, 2nd Duke of Cumberland and Teviotdale	George; 1819–1904; 2nd Duke of Cambridge	Mary Adelaide; 1833–1897
Dukedom of Cambridge (4th creation) extinct, 1904
Duke of Edinburgh (2nd creation), 1866	Duke of Connaught and Strathearn, 1874	Duke of Albany (6th creation), 1881
King Edward VII; 1841–1910	Ernest Augustus; 1845–1923; 3rd Duke of Cumberland and Teviotdale	Alice; 1843–1878	Alfred Ernest Albert; 1844–1900; Duke of Edinburgh	Arthur; 1850–1942; 1st Duke of Connaught and Strathearn	Leopold; 1853–1884; 1st Duke of Albany
Dukedom of Cumberland and Teviotdale forfeit, 1919	Dukedom of Edinburgh (2nd creation) extinct, 1900
Duke of Clarence and Avondale, 1890	Duke of York (6th creation), 1892
Albert Victor; 1864–1892; Duke of Clarence and Avondale	George; 1865–1936; Duke of York, later King George V	Mary of Teck; 1867–1953	Victoria of Hesse and by Rhine; 1863–1950	Arthur of Connaught; 1883–1938
Dukedom of Clarence and Avondale extinct, 1892	Dukedom of York (6th creation) merged in the Crown, 1910
Duke of Windsor, 1937	Duke of York (7th creation), 1920	Duke of Kent (2nd creation), 1934	Duke of Gloucester (5th creation), 1928
King Edward VIII; 1894–1972; Later Duke of Windsor	Albert; 1895–1952; Duke of York, later King George VI	Alice of Battenberg; 1885–1969	George; 1902–1942; 1st Duke of Kent	Henry; 1900–1974; 1st Duke of Gloucester	Alastair Arthur; 1914–1943; 2nd Duke of Connaught and Strathearn	Charles Edward; 1884–1954; 2nd Duke of Albany
Dukedom of Windsor extinct, 1972	Dukedom of York (7th creation) merged in the Crown, 1936	Dukedom of Connaught and Strathearn extinct, 1943	Dukedom of Albany (6th creation) forfeit, 1919
Duke of Edinburgh (3rd creation), 1947
Queen Elizabeth II; 1926–2022	Philip; 1921–2021; 1st Duke of Edinburgh	Edward b. 1935; 2nd Duke of Kent
Duke of York (8th creation), 1986 (revoked 2025)	Duke of Edinburgh (4th creation), 2023
Charles b. 1948; 2nd Duke of Edinburgh, later King Charles III	Andrew b. 1960; Duke of York	Edward b. 1964; Duke of Edinburgh	George Windsor b. 1962	Richard b. 1944; 2nd Duke of Gloucester
Dukedom of Edinburgh (3rd creation) merged in the Crown, 2022	No male heirs	Dukedom of Edinburgh (4th creation) is a life peerage and therefore not hereditary	Heir apparent to the Dukedom of Kent
Duke of Cambridge (5th creation), 2011	Duke of Sussex (2nd creation), 2018
William b. 1982; Duke of Cambridge	Harry b. 1984; Duke of Sussex	Edward Windsor b. 1988	Alexander Windsor b. 1974
Heir-apparent to the Dukedom of Gloucester
George of Wales b. 2013	Archie of Sussex b. 2019
Heir apparent to the Dukedom of Cambridge	Heir apparent to the Dukedom of Sussex

== Heraldry ==
Here are the achievements of the various Dukes of Edinburgh:

Coat of arms of Prince Frederick as Duke of Edinburgh

Coat of arms of George III as Duke of Edinburgh

Coat of arms of Prince Alfred as Duke of Edinburgh

Coat of arms of Prince Philip, Duke of Edinburgh

Coat of arms of Charles III as Duke of Edinburgh

Coat of arms of Prince Edward, Duke of Edinburgh

== In media ==
A fictional Duke of Edinburgh appears in the 1983 sitcom The Black Adder. Rowan Atkinson plays the title character, Prince Edmund, who is granted the title Duke of Edinburgh by his father, a fictitious King Richard IV. By the series' end however, Edmund's dukedom is revoked, leaving him as "Lord Warden of the Royal Privies."

== See also ==
- Duke of Gloucester and Edinburgh
- Duchess of Edinburgh
