= Lord Culloden =

Lord Culloden may refer to:

- a peerage title, see Baron Culloden
- a courtesy title, see Xan Windsor, Lord Culloden
- a judicial title, see Duncan Forbes, Lord Culloden
