= Duke of Gloucester =

Aristocratic title

Dukedom of Gloucester
- Arms of Prince Richard, Duke of Gloucester
- Creation date: 31 March 1928
- Creation: Fifth
- Created by: George V
- Peerage: Peerage of the United Kingdom
- First holder: Thomas of Woodstock
- Present holder: Prince Richard
- Heir apparent: Alexander Windsor, Earl of Ulster
- Remainder to: the 1st Duke's heirs male of the body lawfully begotten
- Subsidiary titles: Earl of Ulster; Baron Culloden
- Status: Extant
- Former seat: Barnwell Manor

Duke of Gloucester (/ˈɡlɒstər/ GLOST-ər) is a British royal title (after Gloucester), often conferred on one of the sons of the reigning monarch. The first four creations were in the Peerage of England and the last in the Peerage of the United Kingdom; the current creation carries with it the subsidiary titles of Earl of Ulster and Baron Culloden.

The title was first conferred on Thomas of Woodstock, the thirteenth child of Edward III. The title became extinct at his death, as it did upon the death of the duke of the second creation, Humphrey of Lancaster, fourth son of Henry IV.

The title was next conferred on Richard, brother to Edward IV. When Richard himself became king, the dukedom merged into the crown. After Richard's death, the title was considered ominous, since the first three such dukes had all died without issue to inherit their titles. The title was not awarded for over 150 years: the next to receive the dukedom was the son of King Charles I, Henry Stuart, upon whose death the title again became extinct.

Prince William, son of the future Queen Anne, was styled "Duke of Gloucester" for his whole life (1689–1700), but was never formally created duke. Frederick, Prince of Wales, was styled "Duke of Gloucester" from 1718–1726, but was then created Duke of Edinburgh rather than of Gloucester.

There was next a creation of a double dukedom (not two dukedoms) for the brother of King George III, Prince William Henry, his proper title becoming "Duke of Gloucester and Edinburgh".

The fifth and most recent creation was for Prince Henry, third son of King George V, styled as His Royal Highness The Duke of Gloucester. Upon Prince Henry's death, the dukedom was inherited by his only surviving son Prince Richard, who still holds the title. The heir-apparent to the title is Alexander Windsor, styled with his father's first subsidiary title as Earl of Ulster. The next in the line of succession is the Earl of Ulster's son Xan Windsor, known by his grandfather's third title of Lord Culloden. The royal dukedom will devolve into an ordinary one when inherited by Alexander Windsor; as a great-grandson of a sovereign he is not entitled to royal style, and will be styled as His Grace The Duke of Gloucester.

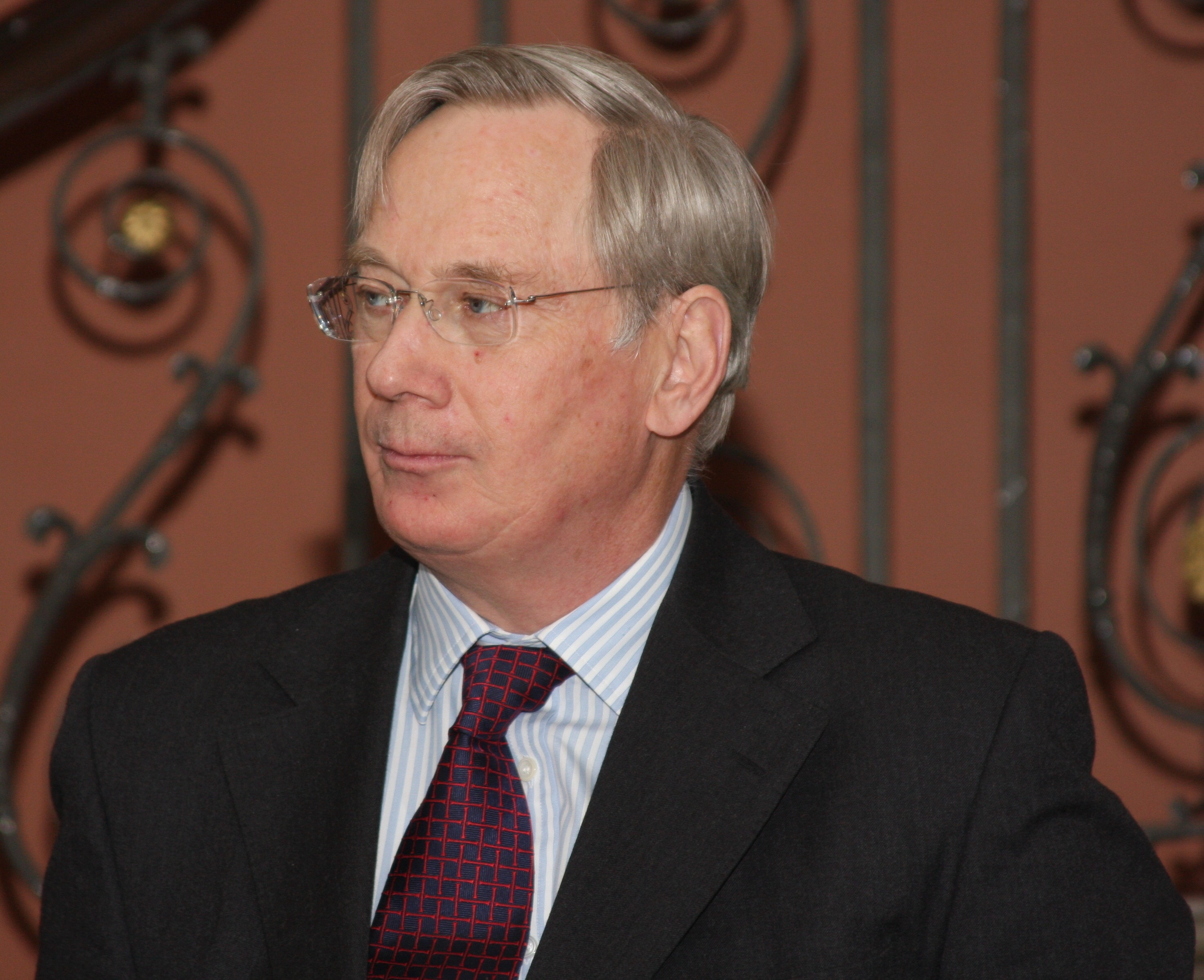
Prince Richard, the current Duke of Gloucester

== Dukes of Gloucester ==
=== First creation, 1385–1397 ===
Duke	Portrait	Birth	Marriage(s)	Death	Arms
Thomas of Woodstock; House of Plantagenet; 1385–1397 also: Duke of Aumale (1385–1397), Earl of Essex (1376–1397), Earl of Buckingham (1377)	Thomas of Woodstock	7 January 1355; Woodstock Palace Son of Edward III of England and Philippa of Hainault	Eleanor de Bohun; 1376; 5 children	8 September 1397; Calais aged 42	
Thomas of Woodstock's son died two years after his father, but never succeeded to his titles except that of Earl of Buckingham. At the time of Thomas's death, he was regarded as a traitor and thus his titles were forfeit after his murder (except Earl of Buckingham). His son had no issue and his male line died out in 1399.

=== Second creation, 1414–1447 ===
Duke	Portrait	Birth	Marriage(s)	Death	Arms
Humphrey of Lancaster; House of Lancaster; 1414–1447 also: Earl of Pembroke (1414)	Humphrey of Lancaster	3 October 1390; Lancaster Castle Son of Henry IV of England and Mary de Bohun	Jacqueline, Countess of Hainaut; 1422–1428 (annulled); 1 child (stillborn) Eleanor de Cobham; 1428–1441 (annulled); 2 children	23 February 1447; Bury St Edmunds aged 56	
Before marrying Humphrey, Eleanor de Cobham was his mistress. At the time of Humphrey's 1447 death, he had two children, Arthur and Antigone. However, both children were born before his marriage to Eleanor and were thus illegitimate and could not succeed to his titles; so, accordingly, all his titles became extinct on his death.

=== Third creation, 1461 ===
Duke	Portrait	Birth	Marriage(s)	Death	Arms
Richard Plantagenet; House of York; 1461–1483	Richard Plantagenet	2 October 1452; Fotheringhay Castle, Oundle Son of Richard, Duke of York and Cecily Neville	Anne Neville; 1472–1485 (her death); 1 child	22 August 1485; Bosworth Field aged 32	
Richard succeeded as Richard III in 1483 upon his nephew's disappearance, and his titles merged with the crown.

=== Fourth creation, 1659 ===
Duke	Portrait	Birth	Marriage(s)	Death	Arms
Henry Stuart; House of Stuart; 1659–1660 also: Earl of Cambridge (1659)	Henry Stuart	8 July 1640; Oatlands Palace, Oatlands Son of King Charles I and Queen Henrietta Maria	Never married	18 September 1660; Whitehall, London aged 20	
Henry Stuart had no children and all his titles became extinct on his death.

=== Only styled, 1689 ===
Duke	Portrait	Birth	Marriage(s)	Death	Arms
Prince William; House of Oldenburg; 1689–1700	Prince William of Denmark	24 July 1689; Hampton Court Palace, London Son of Queen Anne and Prince George	Never married	30 July 1700; Windsor Castle, Windsor aged 11	

=== Only styled, 1717 ===
Duke	Portrait	Birth	Marriage(s)	Death	Arms
Prince Frederick; House of Hanover; 1717–1726	Prince Frederick	1 February 1707; Leineschloss, Hanover Son of King George II and Queen Caroline	Princess Augusta of Saxe-Gotha; 17 April 1736; 9 children	31 March 1751; Leicester House, Westminster aged 44	

=== Fifth creation, 1928 ===
Also: Earl of Ulster and Baron Culloden (1928)

Duke	Portrait	Birth	Marriage(s)	Death	Arms
Prince Henry; House of Windsor; 1928–1974	Prince Henry	31 March 1900; York Cottage, Sandringham Son of King George V and Queen Mary	Lady Alice Montagu Douglas Scott; 6 November 1935; 2 children	10 June 1974; Barnwell Manor, Barnwell aged 74	
Prince Richard; House of Windsor; 1974–present	Prince Richard	26 August 1944; St. Matthew's Nursing Home, Northampton Son of Prince Henry and Princess Alice	Birgitte van Deurs Henriksen; 8 June 1972; 3 children	– now 82 years, 87 days old	

== Line of succession ==
- Prince Henry, Duke of Gloucester (1900–1974)
  - Prince William of Gloucester (1941–1972)
  - Prince Richard, Duke of Gloucester (born 1944)
    - (1) Alexander Windsor, Earl of Ulster (born 1974)
      - (2) Xan Windsor, Lord Culloden (born 2007)

== Arms ==
Arms of Thomas of Woodstock: Royal arms of England (arms of his father King Edward III) with difference a bordure argent

Arms of Humphrey of Lancaster, 1st Duke of Gloucester: Arms of King Henry IV differenced by a bordure argent

Arms of Thomas of Lancaster, 1st Duke of Clarence, second son of King Henry IV. Blason: Arms of King Henry IV a label of three points argent each charged with three ermine spots and a canton gules. Later borne by Richard, Duke of Gloucester (later King Richard III).

Coat of arms of Henry as a son of the Sovereign

Prince William's Coat of Arms

Coat of Arms of Henry, the Duke of Gloucester

Coat of Arms of Prince Richard, Duke of Gloucester

Coat of arms of Alexander Windsor, Earl of Ulster, eldest son of the Duke, & heir to the Dukedom of Gloucester

== Family trees ==
Family tree of the Dukes of Gloucester, Dukes of Edinburgh, the Dukes of Gloucester and Edinburgh, the Marquesses of Carisbrooke, and the Earls of Ulster (UK creations)

Edward III of England; 1312–1377
Duke of Gloucester (1st creation), 1385
John of Gaunt; 1340–1399; Duke of Lancaster	Thomas of Woodstock; 1355–1397; Duke of Gloucester
Dukedom of Gloucester (1st creation) extinct, 1397
Henry IV of England; 1367–1413	John Beaufort; 1373–1410; 1st Earl of Somerset	Joan Beaufort c. 1379–1440
Duke of Gloucester (2nd creation), 1414
Humphrey of Lancaster; 1390–1447; Duke of Gloucester	John Beaufort; 1404–1444; Duke of Somerset	Cecily Neville; 1415–1495
Dukedom of Gloucester (2nd creation) extinct, 1447
Duke of Gloucester (3rd creation), 1461
Margaret Beaufort; 1443–1509	Edward IV of England; 1442–1483	Richard of York; 1452–1485; Duke of Gloucester; Later Richard III of England
Dukedom of Gloucester (3rd creation) merged in the Crown, 1483
Henry VII of England; 1457–1509	Elizabeth of York; 1466–1503
Margaret Tudor; 1489–1541	Henry VIII of England; 1491–1547
James V of Scotland; 1512–1542
Mary, Queen of Scots; 1542–1587
James VI & I of Scotland and England; 1566–1625
Princess Elizabeth Stuart; 1596–1662	Charles I of Scotland and England; 1600–1649
Duke of Gloucester (4th creation), 1659
Sophia of Hanover; 1630–1714	James II of Scotland and England; 1633–1701	Prince Henry; 1640–1660; Duke of Gloucester
Dukedom of Gloucester (4th creation) extinct, 1660
George I of Great Britain; 1660–1727	Anne of Great Britain; 1665–1714
George II of Great Britain; 1683–1760	Prince William; 1689–1700 styled Duke of Gloucester
Duke of Edinburgh (1st creation), Marquess of the Isle of Ely, Earl of Eltham (1st creation), Viscount Launceston, and Baron Snowdon, 1726
Prince Frederick Louis; 1707–1751; 1st Duke of Edinburgh, etc., styled Duke of Gloucester until created Duke of Edinburgh, 1726
Duke of Gloucester and Edinburgh, 1764
Prince George William Frederick; 1738–1820; 2nd Duke of Edinburgh, etc. Later George III of Great Britain, later the United Kingdom	Prince William Henry; 1743–1805; 1st Duke of Gloucester and Edinburgh
Dukedom of Edinburgh (1st creation) and subsidiary titles merged in the Crown, 1760	Dukedom of Gloucester and Edinburgh unused, 1805–1816
William IV of the United Kingdom; 1765–1837	Prince Edward; 1767–1820; Duke of Kent and Strathearn	Princess Mary; 1776–1857	Prince William Frederick; 1776–1834; 2nd Duke of Gloucester and Edinburgh
Dukedom of Gloucester and Edinburgh extinct, 1834
Queen Victoria of the United Kingdom; 1819–1901
Duke of Edinburgh (2nd creation) and Earl of Ulster (UK, 1st creation), 1866
Princess Alice; 1843–1878	Edward VII of the United Kingdom; 1841–1910	Prince Alfred Ernest Albert; 1844–1900; Duke of Saxe-Coburg and Gotha, Duke of Edinburgh, etc.	Princess Beatrice; 1857–1944
Dukedom of Edinburgh (2nd creation) and subsidiary title extinct, 1900
Marquess of Carisbrooke, Earl of Berkhampstead, Viscount Launceston, 1917
Princess Victoria of Hesse and by Rhine; 1863–1950	George V of the United Kingdom; 1865–1936	Alexander Albert Mountbatten; 1886–1960; Marquess of Carisbrooke, etc.
Marquessate of Carisbrooke and subsidiary titles extinct, 1960
Duke of Gloucester (5th creation), Earl of Ulster (UK, 2nd creation), Baron Culloden (2nd creation), 1928
Princess Alice of Battenberg; 1885–1969	George VI of the United Kingdom; 1895–1952	Prince Henry; 1900–1974; 1st Duke of Gloucester, etc.
Duke of Edinburgh (3rd creation), 1947
Prince Philip; 1921–2021; 1st Duke of Edinburgh	Elizabeth II of the United Kingdom; 1926–2022
Duke of Edinburgh (4th creation), 2023
Prince Charles b. 1948; 2nd Duke of Edinburgh; Later Charles III of the United Kingdom	Prince Edward b. 1964; Duke of Edinburgh, Earl of Wessex, Earl of Forfar, and Viscount Severn	Prince Richard b. 1944; 2nd Duke of Gloucester, etc.
Dukedom of Edinburgh (3rd creation) merged in the Crown, 2022	Dukedom of Edinburgh (4th creation) is a life peerage and therefore not hereditary
Alexander Windsor b. 1974 styled Earl of Ulster
Heir-apparent to the Dukedom of Gloucester
Xan Windsor b. 2007 styled Baron Culloden

Family tree of British royal dukes

Includes dukes of: Albany, Albemarle, Bedford, Cambridge, Clarence, Connaught and Strathearn, Cumberland, Edinburgh, Gloucester, Gloucester and Edinburgh, Hereford, Kent, Kintyre and Lorne, Norfolk, Ross, Somerset, Sussex, Windsor, and York, but only when royally.

Non-royal dukes are not included; see Royal dukedoms in the United Kingdom.
Also not included are titles mandated for use by the heir apparent (Duke of Rothesay and the 1337 creation of the Duke of Cornwall), see Princes of Wales family tree.

King Robert II; 1316–1390	King Edward III; 1312–1377
Duke of Albany (1st creation), 1398	Duke of Clarence (1st creation), 1362	Duke of York (1st creation), 1385
King Robert III c. 1337–1406	Robert Stewart c. 1340–1420; 1st Duke of Albany	Edward the Black Prince; 1330–1376	Lionel of Antwerp; 1338–1368; Duke of Clarence	John of Gaunt; 1340–1399	Edmund; 1341–1402; 1st Duke of York
Dukedom of Clarence (1st creation) extinct, 1368
Duke of Cornwall (2nd creation), 1376	Duke of Hereford, 1397	Duke of Gloucester (1st creation), 1385
Murdoch Stewart c. 1362–1425; 2nd Duke of Albany	Richard of Bordeaux; 1367–1400; Duke of Cornwall, later King Richard II	Henry Bolingbroke; 1367–1413; Duke of Hereford, later King Henry IV	Thomas of Woodstock; 1355–1397; Duke of Gloucester
Dukedom of Albany (1st creation) forfeit, 1425	Dukedom of Cornwall (2nd creation) merged in the crown, 1377	Dukedom of Hereford merged in the crown, 1399	Dukedom of Gloucester (1st creation) extinct, 1397
Duke of Clarence (2nd creation), 1412	Duke of Bedford (1st & 2nd creations), 1414	Duke of Gloucester (2nd creation), 1414	Duke of Albemarle (Aumale) (1st creation), 1397
Thomas of Lancaster; 1387–1421; Duke of Clarence	John of Lancaster; 1389–1435; Duke of Bedford; Surrendered dukedom and then regranted, 1433	Humphrey of Lancaster; 1390–1447; Duke of Gloucester	John Beaufort; 1373–1410	Joan Beaufort c. 1379–1440	Edward of Norwich c. 1373–1415; Duke of Aumale, 2nd Duke of York	Richard of Conisburgh; 1385–1415
Dukedom of Clarence (2nd creation) extinct, 1421	Dukedom of Bedford (2nd creation) extinct, 1435	Dukedom of Gloucester (2nd creation) extinct, 1447	Dukedom of Albemarle (Aumale) (1st creation) forfeit, 1399
Duke of York (1st creation) restored, 1425; Duke of Cornwall (3rd creation), 1460
King James I 1394–1437	Joan Beaufort c. 1404–1445	Owen Tudor c. 1400–1461	John Beaufort; 1404–1444	Richard Neville; 1400–1460	Cecily Neville; 1415–1495	Richard of York; 1411–1460; 3rd Duke of York, Duke of Cornwall
Duke of Cornwall (3rd creation) extinct, 1460
Duke of Bedford (5th creation), 1485	Duke of Clarence (3rd creation), 1461	Duke of Gloucester (3rd creation), 1461
King James II; 1430–1460	Jasper Tudor c. 1431–1495; Duke of Bedford	Edmund Tudor c. 1430–1456	Lady Margaret Beaufort; 1443–1509	John Neville c. 1431–1471	Elizabeth Woodville c. 1437–1492	Edward; 1442–1483; 4th Duke of York, later King Edward IV	George Plantagenet; 1449–1478; Duke of Clarence	Richard of York; 1452–1485; Duke of Gloucester, later King Richard III
Dukedom of Bedford (5th creation) extinct, 1495	Dukedom of York (1st creation) merged in the Crown, 1461	Dukedom of Clarence (3rd creation) forfeit, 1478	Dukedom of Gloucester (3rd creation) merged in the Crown, 1483
Duke of Albany (2nd creation), 1458	Duke of Bedford (3rd creation), 1470	Duke of York (2nd creation), 1474; Duke of Norfolk (3rd creation), 1477	Duke of Bedford (4th creation), 1478
Alexander Stewart c. 1454–1485; 1st Duke of Albany	King James III; 1451/1452–1488	George Neville; 1457–1483; Duke of Bedford	King Henry VII; 1457–1509	Elizabeth of York; 1466–1503	Richard of Shrewsbury; 1473–1483; Duke of York, Duke of Norfolk	George of York; 1477–1479; Duke of Bedford
Dukedom of Bedford (3rd creation) forfeit, 1478	Dukedom of York (2nd creation) and Dukedom of Norfolk (3rd creation) extinct, 1483	Dukedom of Bedford (4th creation) extinct, 1479
Duke of Ross (1st creation), 1488	Duke of York (3rd creation), 1494	Duke of Somerset (3rd creation), 1499
John Stewart; 1482–1536; 2nd Duke of Albany	James Stewart; 1476–1504; Duke of Ross	King James IV; 1473–1513	Margaret Tudor; 1489–1541	Henry; 1491–1547; Duke of York, later King Henry VIII	Edmund Tudor; 1499–1500; Duke of Somerset (nominated but probably not invested)
Dukedom of Albany (2nd creation) extinct, 1536	Dukedom of Ross (1st creation) extinct, 1504	Dukedom of York (3rd creation) merged in the Crown, 1509	Dukedom of Somerset (3rd creation) extinct, 1500
Duke of Ross (2nd creation), 1514
King James V 1512–1542	Alexander Stewart; 1514–1515; Duke of Ross
Duke of Albany (3rd creation), 1565	Dukedom of Ross (2nd creation) extinct, 1515
Henry Stuart; 1546–1567; 1st Duke of Albany	Queen Mary; 1542–1587
James; 1566–1625; 2nd Duke of Albany, later King James VI & I
Dukedom of Albany (3rd creation) merged in the Crown, 1567
Duke of Albany (4th creation), 1604; Duke of York (4th creation), 1605	Duke of Kintyre and Lorne, 1602
Elizabeth Stuart; 1596–1662	Henry Frederick; 1594–1612	Charles; 1600–1649; Duke of Albany, Duke of York, later King Charles I	Robert Stuart; 1602; Duke of Kintyre and Lorne
Dukedom of Albany (4th creation), Dukedom of York (4th creation) merged in the Crown, 1625	Dukedom of Kintyre and Lorne extinct, 1602
Duke of York (5th creation) 1644; Duke of Albany (5th creation), 1660	Duke of Gloucester (4th creation), 1659
Sophia of Hanover; 1630–1714	James Stuart; 1633–1701; Duke of York, Duke of Albany, later King James VII & II	Henry; 1640–1660; Duke of Gloucester
Dukedom of Albany (5th creation) and Dukedom of York (5th creation) merged in the Crown, 1685	Dukedom of Gloucester (4th creation) extinct, 1660
Duke of York and Albany (1st creation), 1716	Duke of Cambridge (1st creation), 1664	Duke of Kendal (1st creation), 1666	Duke of Cambridge (2nd creation), 1667
King George I 1660–1727	Ernest Augustus; 1674–1728; Duke of York and Albany	Charles Stuart; 1660–1661 styled Duke of Cambridge	James Stuart; 1663–1667; Duke of Cambridge	Queen Anne; 1665–1714	Charles Stuart; 1666–1667 designated Duke of Kendal	Edgar Stuart; 1667–1671; Duke of Cambridge	Charles Stuart; 1677 styled Duke of Cambridge
Dukedom of York and Albany (1st creation) extinct, 1728	Dukedom of Cambridge (1st creation) extinct, 1667	Dukedom of Kendal (1st creation), extinct, 1667	Dukedom of Cambridge (2nd creation) extinct, 1671
Duke of Cambridge (3rd creation)
George; 1683–1760; Duke of Cambridge, later King George II	William; 1689–1700 styled Duke of Gloucester
Dukedom of Cambridge (3rd creation) merged with the Crown, 1727
Duke of Edinburgh (1st creation), 1726	Duke of Cumberland (3rd creation), 1726
Frederick; 1707–1751; 1st Duke of Edinburgh, styled Duke of Gloucester until created Duke of Edinburgh	William Augustus; 1721–1765; Duke of Cumberland
Dukedom of Cumberland (3rd creation) extinct, 1765
Duke of York and Albany (2nd creation), 1760	Duke of Gloucester and Edinburgh, 1764	Duke of Cumberland and Strathearn, 1766
George; 1738–1820; 2nd Duke of Edinburgh, later King George III	Edward; 1739–1767; Duke of York and Albany	William Henry; 1743–1805; 1st Duke of Gloucester and Edinburgh	Henry; 1745–1790; Duke of Cumberland and Strathearn
Dukedom of Edinburgh (1st creation), merged in the Crown, 1760	Dukedom of York and Albany (2nd creation) extinct, 1767	Dukedom of Cumberland and Strathearn extinct, 1790
Duke of York and Albany (3rd creation), 1784	Duke of Clarence and St Andrews, 1789	Duke of Kent and Strathearn, 1799	Duke of Cumberland and Teviotdale, 1799	Duke of Sussex (1st creation), 1801	Duke of Cambridge (4th creation), 1801
Frederick; 1763–1827; Duke of York and Albany	William Henry; 1765–1837, Duke of Clarence and St Andrews, later King William IV	Edward; 1767–1820; Duke of Kent and Strathearn	Ernest Augustus; 1771–1851; King of Hanover, 1st Duke of Cumberland and Teviotdale	Augustus Frederick; 1773–1843; Duke of Sussex	Adolphus; 1774–1850; 1st Duke of Cambridge	Mary; 1776–1857	William Frederick; 1776–1834; 2nd Duke of Gloucester and Edinburgh
Dukedom of York and Albany (3rd creation) extinct, 1827	Dukedom of Clarence and St Andrews merged in the Crown, 1830	Dukedom of Kent and Strathearn extinct, 1820	Dukedom of Sussex (1st creation) extinct, 1843	Dukedom of Gloucester and Edinburgh extinct, 1834
Queen Victoria; 1819–1901	George V 1819–1878; King of Hanover, 2nd Duke of Cumberland and Teviotdale	George; 1819–1904; 2nd Duke of Cambridge	Mary Adelaide; 1833–1897
Dukedom of Cambridge (4th creation) extinct, 1904
Duke of Edinburgh (2nd creation), 1866	Duke of Connaught and Strathearn, 1874	Duke of Albany (6th creation), 1881
King Edward VII; 1841–1910	Ernest Augustus; 1845–1923; 3rd Duke of Cumberland and Teviotdale	Alice; 1843–1878	Alfred Ernest Albert; 1844–1900; Duke of Edinburgh	Arthur; 1850–1942; 1st Duke of Connaught and Strathearn	Leopold; 1853–1884; 1st Duke of Albany
Dukedom of Cumberland and Teviotdale forfeit, 1919	Dukedom of Edinburgh (2nd creation) extinct, 1900
Duke of Clarence and Avondale, 1890	Duke of York (6th creation), 1892
Albert Victor; 1864–1892; Duke of Clarence and Avondale	George; 1865–1936; Duke of York, later King George V	Mary of Teck; 1867–1953	Victoria of Hesse and by Rhine; 1863–1950	Arthur of Connaught; 1883–1938
Dukedom of Clarence and Avondale extinct, 1892	Dukedom of York (6th creation) merged in the Crown, 1910
Duke of Windsor, 1937	Duke of York (7th creation), 1920	Duke of Kent (2nd creation), 1934	Duke of Gloucester (5th creation), 1928
King Edward VIII; 1894–1972; Later Duke of Windsor	Albert; 1895–1952; Duke of York, later King George VI	Alice of Battenberg; 1885–1969	George; 1902–1942; 1st Duke of Kent	Henry; 1900–1974; 1st Duke of Gloucester	Alastair Arthur; 1914–1943; 2nd Duke of Connaught and Strathearn	Charles Edward; 1884–1954; 2nd Duke of Albany
Dukedom of Windsor extinct, 1972	Dukedom of York (7th creation) merged in the Crown, 1936	Dukedom of Connaught and Strathearn extinct, 1943	Dukedom of Albany (6th creation) forfeit, 1919
Duke of Edinburgh (3rd creation), 1947
Queen Elizabeth II; 1926–2022	Philip; 1921–2021; 1st Duke of Edinburgh	Edward b. 1935; 2nd Duke of Kent
Duke of York (8th creation), 1986 (revoked 2025)	Duke of Edinburgh (4th creation), 2023
Charles b. 1948; 2nd Duke of Edinburgh, later King Charles III	Andrew b. 1960; Duke of York	Edward b. 1964; Duke of Edinburgh	George Windsor b. 1962	Richard b. 1944; 2nd Duke of Gloucester
Dukedom of Edinburgh (3rd creation) merged in the Crown, 2022	No male heirs	Dukedom of Edinburgh (4th creation) is a life peerage and therefore not hereditary	Heir apparent to the Dukedom of Kent
Duke of Cambridge (5th creation), 2011	Duke of Sussex (2nd creation), 2018
William b. 1982; Duke of Cambridge	Harry b. 1984; Duke of Sussex	Edward Windsor b. 1988	Alexander Windsor b. 1974
Heir-apparent to the Dukedom of Gloucester
George of Wales b. 2013	Archie of Sussex b. 2019
Heir apparent to the Dukedom of Cambridge	Heir apparent to the Dukedom of Sussex

== See also ==
- List of dukedoms in the peerages of Britain and Ireland
- Earl of Gloucester
- Duchess of Gloucester

== Sources ==
- Beatty, Michael A. (2003). The English Royal Family of America, from Jamestown to the American Revolution. McFarland. pp. 43–47. ISBN 978-0-7864-1558-8.
- Chapman, Hester (1955). Queen Anne's Son: A Memoir of William Henry, Duke of Gloucester. Andre Deutsch.
- Goodman, Anthony (1971). The Loyal Conspiracy: The Lords Appellant under Richard II. University of Miami Press.
- Henderson, Thomas Finlayson (1891). "Henry (1639-1660)" . In Stephen, Leslie; Lee, Sidney (eds.). Dictionary of National Biography. Vol. 26. London: Smith, Elder & Co. pp. 108–109.
- Kendall, Paul M. (1956) [1955]. Richard the Third. New York: W. W. Norton & Company. ISBN 978-0-393-00785-5. OL 7450809M.
- Panton, James (2011). Historical Dictionary of the British Monarchy. Scarecrow Press. ISBN 978-0-8108-7497-8.
- Weir, Alison (2011). Britain's Royal Families: The Complete Genealogy. Random House. ISBN 978-1-4464-4911-0.
