= Marquess of Carisbrooke =

Title in the Peerage of the United Kingdom

Marquessate of Carisbrooke
- Quarterly: 1st and 4th grand quarters, the Royal Arms differenced by a label of 3 points Argent, the centre point charged with a heart Gules and each of the other points with a rose of the last, barbed and seeded proper; 2nd and 3rd grand quarters, quarterly 1st and 4th Azure a lion rampant double-queued barry of ten Argent and Gules, armed and langued of the last, crowned Or within a bordure company of the second and third, 2nd and 3rd Argent two pallets Sable.
- Creation date: 18 July 1917
- Created by: King George V
- Peerage: Peerage of the United Kingdom
- First holder: Alexander Mountbatten
- Last holder: Alexander Mountbatten, 1st Marquess of Carisbrooke
- Remainder to: 1st Marquess's heirs male of the body lawfully begotten
- Subsidiary titles: Earl of Berkhampstead; Viscount Launceston
- Status: Extinct
- Extinction date: 23 February 1960

Marquess of Carisbrooke was a title in the Peerage of the United Kingdom. It was created in 1917 for Alexander Mountbatten (formerly Prince Alexander of Battenberg), eldest son of Princess Beatrice of the United Kingdom (youngest daughter of Queen Victoria) and Prince Henry of Battenberg. He was made Viscount Launceston, in the County of Cornwall, and Earl of Berkhampstead at the same time, also in the Peerage of the United Kingdom.

Along with other German-surnamed relations of the British royal family, Alexander also changed his surname at that time, to Mountbatten. The titles became extinct upon Lord Carisbrooke's death in 1960, as he had no sons.

Carisbrooke Castle was the residence of Prince Henry and Princess Beatrice as Governor of the Isle of Wight. The title of Marquess of Berkhampstead had previously been conferred with the Dukedom of Cumberland on Prince William Augustus, son of King George II, in 1726. The title of Viscount Launceston had previously been conferred with the Dukedom of Edinburgh on Prince Frederick Louis, later Prince of Wales, also in 1726.

== Marquess of Carisbrooke (1917) ==
- Alexander Albert Mountbatten, 1st Marquess of Carisbrooke (1886–1960)

== Family tree ==
Family tree of the Dukes of Gloucester, Dukes of Edinburgh, the Dukes of Gloucester and Edinburgh, the Marquesses of Carisbrooke, and the Earls of Ulster (UK creations)

Edward III of England; 1312–1377
Duke of Gloucester (1st creation), 1385
John of Gaunt; 1340–1399; Duke of Lancaster	Thomas of Woodstock; 1355–1397; Duke of Gloucester
Dukedom of Gloucester (1st creation) extinct, 1397
Henry IV of England; 1367–1413	John Beaufort; 1373–1410; 1st Earl of Somerset	Joan Beaufort c. 1379–1440
Duke of Gloucester (2nd creation), 1414
Humphrey of Lancaster; 1390–1447; Duke of Gloucester	John Beaufort; 1404–1444; Duke of Somerset	Cecily Neville; 1415–1495
Dukedom of Gloucester (2nd creation) extinct, 1447
Duke of Gloucester (3rd creation), 1461
Margaret Beaufort; 1443–1509	Edward IV of England; 1442–1483	Richard of York; 1452–1485; Duke of Gloucester; Later Richard III of England
Dukedom of Gloucester (3rd creation) merged in the Crown, 1483
Henry VII of England; 1457–1509	Elizabeth of York; 1466–1503
Margaret Tudor; 1489–1541	Henry VIII of England; 1491–1547
James V of Scotland; 1512–1542
Mary, Queen of Scots; 1542–1587
James VI & I of Scotland and England; 1566–1625
Princess Elizabeth Stuart; 1596–1662	Charles I of Scotland and England; 1600–1649
Duke of Gloucester (4th creation), 1659
Sophia of Hanover; 1630–1714	James II of Scotland and England; 1633–1701	Prince Henry; 1640–1660; Duke of Gloucester
Dukedom of Gloucester (4th creation) extinct, 1660
George I of Great Britain; 1660–1727	Anne of Great Britain; 1665–1714
George II of Great Britain; 1683–1760	Prince William; 1689–1700 styled Duke of Gloucester
Duke of Edinburgh (1st creation), Marquess of the Isle of Ely, Earl of Eltham (1st creation), Viscount Launceston, and Baron Snowdon, 1726
Prince Frederick Louis; 1707–1751; 1st Duke of Edinburgh, etc., styled Duke of Gloucester until created Duke of Edinburgh, 1726
Duke of Gloucester and Edinburgh, 1764
Prince George William Frederick; 1738–1820; 2nd Duke of Edinburgh, etc. Later George III of Great Britain, later the United Kingdom	Prince William Henry; 1743–1805; 1st Duke of Gloucester and Edinburgh
Dukedom of Edinburgh (1st creation) and subsidiary titles merged in the Crown, 1760	Dukedom of Gloucester and Edinburgh unused, 1805–1816
William IV of the United Kingdom; 1765–1837	Prince Edward; 1767–1820; Duke of Kent and Strathearn	Princess Mary; 1776–1857	Prince William Frederick; 1776–1834; 2nd Duke of Gloucester and Edinburgh
Dukedom of Gloucester and Edinburgh extinct, 1834
Queen Victoria of the United Kingdom; 1819–1901
Duke of Edinburgh (2nd creation) and Earl of Ulster (UK, 1st creation), 1866
Princess Alice; 1843–1878	Edward VII of the United Kingdom; 1841–1910	Prince Alfred Ernest Albert; 1844–1900; Duke of Saxe-Coburg and Gotha, Duke of Edinburgh, etc.	Princess Beatrice; 1857–1944
Dukedom of Edinburgh (2nd creation) and subsidiary title extinct, 1900
Marquess of Carisbrooke, Earl of Berkhampstead, Viscount Launceston, 1917
Princess Victoria of Hesse and by Rhine; 1863–1950	George V of the United Kingdom; 1865–1936	Alexander Albert Mountbatten; 1886–1960; Marquess of Carisbrooke, etc.
Marquessate of Carisbrooke and subsidiary titles extinct, 1960
Duke of Gloucester (5th creation), Earl of Ulster (UK, 2nd creation), Baron Culloden (2nd creation), 1928
Princess Alice of Battenberg; 1885–1969	George VI of the United Kingdom; 1895–1952	Prince Henry; 1900–1974; 1st Duke of Gloucester, etc.
Duke of Edinburgh (3rd creation), 1947
Prince Philip; 1921–2021; 1st Duke of Edinburgh	Elizabeth II of the United Kingdom; 1926–2022
Duke of Edinburgh (4th creation), 2023
Prince Charles b. 1948; 2nd Duke of Edinburgh; Later Charles III of the United Kingdom	Prince Edward b. 1964; Duke of Edinburgh, Earl of Wessex, Earl of Forfar, and Viscount Severn	Prince Richard b. 1944; 2nd Duke of Gloucester, etc.
Dukedom of Edinburgh (3rd creation) merged in the Crown, 2022	Dukedom of Edinburgh (4th creation) is a life peerage and therefore not hereditary
Alexander Windsor b. 1974 styled Earl of Ulster
Heir-apparent to the Dukedom of Gloucester
Xan Windsor b. 2007 styled Baron Culloden
