= Baron Culloden =

Extant barony in the Peerage of the United Kingdom

Baron Culloden (named after Culloden near Inverness) is a title which has been created twice in the Peerage of the United Kingdom for members of the British royal family.

The barony's creation continued the tradition of awarding members of the Royal Family titles from each of the three kingdoms comprising the United Kingdom: England, Scotland and Ireland.

== Baron Culloden, first creation (1801) ==
The first creation was on 27 November 1801 for Prince Adolphus Frederick, seventh son of King George III. He was created Duke of Cambridge, Earl of Tipperary and Baron Culloden in the peerage of the United Kingdom. This title became extinct on 17 March 1904 at the death of his son Prince George, the second holder.

== Baron Culloden, second creation (1928) ==
The second creation was on 31 March 1928 for Prince Henry, third son of King George V, who was created Duke of Gloucester, Earl of Ulster and Baron Culloden, in the peerage of the United Kingdom.

- Prince Henry, 1st Duke of Gloucester (1900–1974)
- Prince Richard, 2nd Duke of Gloucester (born 1944)
  - Xan Richard Anders Windsor (born 2007), Prince Richard's grandson, is the son of Alexander Windsor, Earl of Ulster, the heir-apparent to the dukedom, and as such uses "Lord Culloden" as a courtesy title.

== Family tree ==
Family tree of Dukes and Marquesses of Cambridge

King James VI and I (1566–1625)
Elizabeth Stuart (1596–1662); Queen of Bohemia	King Charles I (1600–1649)
Duke of Gloucester (4th creation) and Earl of Cambridge (5th creation), 1659
Sophia of Hanover (1630–1714)	King Charles II (1630–1685)	King James VII and II (1633–1701)	Henry Stuart (1640–1660); Duke of Gloucester, etc.
Dukedom of Gloucester (4th creation) and Earl of Cambridge (5th creation) extinct, 1660
Duke of Cambridge (1st creation), Earl of Cambridge (6th creation), and Baron of Dauntsey (1st creation), 1664	Duke of Cambridge (2nd creation), Earl of Cambridge (7th creation), and Baron of Dauntsey (2nd creation), 1667
King George I (1660–1727)	Charles Stuart (1660–1661) styled Duke of Cambridge	James Stuart (1663–1667); Duke of Cambridge, etc.	Edgar Stuart (1667–1671); Duke of Cambridge, etc.	Charles Stuart (1677) styled Duke of Cambridge
Dukedom of Cambridge (1st creation), Earldom of Cambridge (6th creation), and Barony of Dauntsey (1st creation) extinct, 1667	Dukedom of Cambridge (2nd creation), Earldom of Cambridge (7th creation), and Barony of Dauntsey (2nd creation) extinct, 1671
Duke of Cambridge (3rd creation) and Marquess of Cambridge (1st creation), 1706
Prince George (1683–1760); Duke of Cambridge, etc. later King George II
Dukedom of Cambridge (3rd creation) and Marquessate of Cambridge (1st creation) merged with the Crown, 1727
Prince Frederick (1707–1751); Prince of Wales
George III (1738–1820)
Duke of Cambridge (4th creation), Earl of Tipperary and Baron Culloden (1st creation), 1801
Prince Edward (1767–1820); Duke of Kent and Strathearn	Prince Adolphus (1774–1850); 1st Duke of Cambridge, etc.
Queen Victoria (1819–1901)	Prince George (1819–1904); 2nd Duke of Cambridge, etc.	Princess Mary Adelaide of Cambridge (1833–1897)
Dukedom of Cambridge (4th creation), Earldom of Tipperary, and Barony Culloden (1st creation extinct, 1904
King Edward VII (1841–1910)
Marquess of Cambridge (2nd creation), Earl of Eltham (1st creation), and Viscount Northallerton, 1917
King George V (1865–1936)	Mary of Teck (1867–1953)	Adolphus Cambridge (1868–1927); Duke of Teck, 1st Marquess of Cambridge, etc.
King Edward VIII (1894–1972)	King George VI (1895–1952)	George Francis Hugh Cambridge (1895–1981); 2nd Marquess of Cambridge, etc.
Marquessate of Cambridge (2nd creation), Earldom of Eltham (2nd creation), Viscountcy Northallerton extinct, 1981
Queen Elizabeth II (1926–2022)
King Charles III (b. 1948)
Duke of Cambridge (5th creation), Earl of Strathearn (Mountbatten-Windsor line), and Baron Carrickfergus, 2011
Prince William (b. 1982); Prince of Wales, Duke of Cornwall, Duke of Rothesay, Duke of Cambridge, etc., Earl of Chester
Prince George of Wales (b. 2013)
Heir apparent to the Dukedom of Cambridge

Family tree of the Dukes of Gloucester, Dukes of Edinburgh, the Dukes of Gloucester and Edinburgh, the Marquesses of Carisbrooke, and the Earls of Ulster (UK creations)

Edward III of England; 1312–1377
Duke of Gloucester (1st creation), 1385
John of Gaunt; 1340–1399; Duke of Lancaster	Thomas of Woodstock; 1355–1397; Duke of Gloucester
Dukedom of Gloucester (1st creation) extinct, 1397
Henry IV of England; 1367–1413	John Beaufort; 1373–1410; 1st Earl of Somerset	Joan Beaufort c. 1379–1440
Duke of Gloucester (2nd creation), 1414
Humphrey of Lancaster; 1390–1447; Duke of Gloucester	John Beaufort; 1404–1444; Duke of Somerset	Cecily Neville; 1415–1495
Dukedom of Gloucester (2nd creation) extinct, 1447
Duke of Gloucester (3rd creation), 1461
Margaret Beaufort; 1443–1509	Edward IV of England; 1442–1483	Richard of York; 1452–1485; Duke of Gloucester; Later Richard III of England
Dukedom of Gloucester (3rd creation) merged in the Crown, 1483
Henry VII of England; 1457–1509	Elizabeth of York; 1466–1503
Margaret Tudor; 1489–1541	Henry VIII of England; 1491–1547
James V of Scotland; 1512–1542
Mary, Queen of Scots; 1542–1587
James VI & I of Scotland and England; 1566–1625
Princess Elizabeth Stuart; 1596–1662	Charles I of Scotland and England; 1600–1649
Duke of Gloucester (4th creation), 1659
Sophia of Hanover; 1630–1714	James II of Scotland and England; 1633–1701	Prince Henry; 1640–1660; Duke of Gloucester
Dukedom of Gloucester (4th creation) extinct, 1660
George I of Great Britain; 1660–1727	Anne of Great Britain; 1665–1714
George II of Great Britain; 1683–1760	Prince William; 1689–1700 styled Duke of Gloucester
Duke of Edinburgh (1st creation), Marquess of the Isle of Ely, Earl of Eltham (1st creation), Viscount Launceston, and Baron Snowdon, 1726
Prince Frederick Louis; 1707–1751; 1st Duke of Edinburgh, etc., styled Duke of Gloucester until created Duke of Edinburgh, 1726
Duke of Gloucester and Edinburgh, 1764
Prince George William Frederick; 1738–1820; 2nd Duke of Edinburgh, etc. Later George III of Great Britain, later the United Kingdom	Prince William Henry; 1743–1805; 1st Duke of Gloucester and Edinburgh
Dukedom of Edinburgh (1st creation) and subsidiary titles merged in the Crown, 1760	Dukedom of Gloucester and Edinburgh unused, 1805–1816
William IV of the United Kingdom; 1765–1837	Prince Edward; 1767–1820; Duke of Kent and Strathearn	Princess Mary; 1776–1857	Prince William Frederick; 1776–1834; 2nd Duke of Gloucester and Edinburgh
Dukedom of Gloucester and Edinburgh extinct, 1834
Queen Victoria of the United Kingdom; 1819–1901
Duke of Edinburgh (2nd creation) and Earl of Ulster (UK, 1st creation), 1866
Princess Alice; 1843–1878	Edward VII of the United Kingdom; 1841–1910	Prince Alfred Ernest Albert; 1844–1900; Duke of Saxe-Coburg and Gotha, Duke of Edinburgh, etc.	Princess Beatrice; 1857–1944
Dukedom of Edinburgh (2nd creation) and subsidiary title extinct, 1900
Marquess of Carisbrooke, Earl of Berkhampstead, Viscount Launceston, 1917
Princess Victoria of Hesse and by Rhine; 1863–1950	George V of the United Kingdom; 1865–1936	Alexander Albert Mountbatten; 1886–1960; Marquess of Carisbrooke, etc.
Marquessate of Carisbrooke and subsidiary titles extinct, 1960
Duke of Gloucester (5th creation), Earl of Ulster (UK, 2nd creation), Baron Culloden (2nd creation), 1928
Princess Alice of Battenberg; 1885–1969	George VI of the United Kingdom; 1895–1952	Prince Henry; 1900–1974; 1st Duke of Gloucester, etc.
Duke of Edinburgh (3rd creation), 1947
Prince Philip; 1921–2021; 1st Duke of Edinburgh	Elizabeth II of the United Kingdom; 1926–2022
Duke of Edinburgh (4th creation), 2023
Prince Charles b. 1948; 2nd Duke of Edinburgh; Later Charles III of the United Kingdom	Prince Edward b. 1964; Duke of Edinburgh, Earl of Wessex, Earl of Forfar, and Viscount Severn	Prince Richard b. 1944; 2nd Duke of Gloucester, etc.
Dukedom of Edinburgh (3rd creation) merged in the Crown, 2022	Dukedom of Edinburgh (4th creation) is a life peerage and therefore not hereditary
Alexander Windsor b. 1974 styled Earl of Ulster
Heir-apparent to the Dukedom of Gloucester
Xan Windsor b. 2007 styled Baron Culloden

== See also ==
- Duke of Gloucester
