= Earl of Ulster =

Title in the Peerage of the United Kingdom

Earldom of Ulster
- Creation date: 1928
- Creation: Second
- Created by: George V
- Peerage: Peerage of the United Kingdom
- First holder: Hugh de Lacy
- Present holder: Prince Richard, Duke of Gloucester
- Heir apparent: Alexander Windsor, Earl of Ulster
- Status: Extant

Arms of the de Burgh, Earls of Ulster: Or, a cross gules.

Arms of Mortimer, Earls of March and Earls of Ulster: Barry of six or and azure on a chief of the first two pallets between two gyrons of the second over all an inescutcheon argent (Mortimer), quartered with arms of de Burgh

Arms of Richard of York, 3rd Duke of York, 8th Earl of Ulster: Quarterly, 1st and 4th, quarterly, France moderne, and England, overall a label of three points each charged with three torteaux (House of York), 2nd, quarterly, Castile and Leon, 3rd, quarterly, Mortimer and de Burgh, and overall an inescutcheon gules, three lions passant guardant or a bordure Argent (Holland, Earl of Kent)

The title of Earl of Ulster has been created six times in the Peerage of Ireland and twice in the Peerage of the United Kingdom. Since 1928, the title has been held by the Duke of Gloucester and is used as a courtesy title by the Duke's eldest son, currently Alexander Windsor, Earl of Ulster. The wife of the Earl of Ulster is known as the Countess of Ulster. Ulster, one of the four traditional provinces of Ireland, consists of nine counties: six of these make up Northern Ireland; the remainder are in the Republic of Ireland.

== History ==
King Henry II of England granted three Palatinates or seigniories in Ireland to Norman nobles during the Norman invasion of Ireland, that are considered to be equivalents of either earldoms or lordships by modern historians. Richard de Clare, Count Striguil, a Norman-Welsh knight known as Strongbow, was created Earl of Leinster, and the Anglo-Norman Sir Hugh de Lacy was created Earl of Meath. In 1181, Sir John de Courcy was created Earl of Ulster by patent from King Henry II. De Courcy was later also created Lord of Connaught and quickly became a rival of the De Lacys. No record of his enrollment exists, but de Courcy enjoyed the grant of Ulster as an earldom, according to 19th-century analysis of deeds de Courcy executed that survived in patent rolls (the earliest of which dates to 1201).

Though Ulster covers one-sixth of Ireland, making it among the largest land grants in Ireland, De Courcy began aggressively seizing more land in Ireland without permission, drawing the ire of King John of England. Hugh de Lacy the younger, son of the Earl of Meath, accused de Courcy of neglecting to pay homage to King John. The king sent a letter to the feudal barons of Ulster — allies of de Courcy – informing them that if they did not convince their lord to pay proper homage, all their land would be seized. According to the Four Masters, in 1203, Hugh de Lacy the younger, along with a contingent of English soldiers from Meath, marched on Ulaid and expelled de Courcy. A bloody battle between the two sides ensued at a place called Dundaleathglass (possibly Down), but de Courcy escaped following the defeat. In 1204, the de Lacy forces drove de Courcy, "the plunderer of churches and territories," into Tyrone, where he sought protection from the Clan Owen, but the English of Ulaid chased him as far as Carrickfergus, Antrim. On Good Friday 1204, de Courcy was praying at the Church of Downpatrick (from which he had expelled, in 1177, the Augustinian monks settled there by St Malachy in 1124, replacing them with Benedictine monks). According to the account of his capture, the unarmed de Courcy managed to take a weapon from de Lacy's men and killed 13 of the men before he was finally subdued and sent to England where he was imprisoned in the Tower of London. Though he eventually returned to royal favour, de Courcy never returned to Ireland.

De Courcy's lands and title were forfeited, and de Lacy was created the Earl of Ulster with the transfer of de Courcy's rights. The creation specifically granted Hugh de Lacy the right to everything John de Courcy possessed on the day of the battle, with the exception of the churches, which remained with the Crown:

"The King to Meyler Fitz Henry, &c. and the Barons of Ireland, &c.
Know ye, that we have given and granted to Hugh de Lascy, for his homage and service, the land of Ulster, with the appurtenances, to have and to hold as John de Curcy held the same the day on which the same Hugh overcame him in the field, or on the day preceding: SAVING however to us the crosses of the same land. And know ye, that we do retain with us the aforesaid Hugh, and are leading him with us in our service; and therefore to you we command that his land and all his you preserve, maintain and defend as our demesne. Witness myself, at Windsor, the 2nd day of May." — Rotuli Litterarum Patentium in Turri Londinensi asservati 6 John

An additional grant the following year confirmed granted to him the "whole land of Ulster" et hæredibus suis (with remainder to his heirs). He died in 1243, leaving only one legitimate daughter, Lady Maud de Lacy. Upon her marriage to Walter de Burgh, Lord of Connaught in 1264, de Burgh was created Earl of Ulster in right of his wife.

The Burgh coat of arms (or a cross gules) was adopted as the flag of Ulster, though the title passed through the female line out of the family and eventually merged with the Crown. After the third earl was murdered at age 20 (leading to the Burke Civil War), he left only a daughter, Elizabeth de Burgh, 4th Countess of Ulster. She married Lionel of Antwerp, second surviving son of King Edward III, who held the title jure uxoris. Their only child Philippa became Countess of Ulster suo jure while her husband, Edmund Mortimer, 3rd Earl of March, held the title jure uxoris.

After the death of Edmund Mortimer, 5th Earl of March and 7th Earl of Ulster, the earldoms and estates were left to his nephew, Richard of York, 3rd Duke of York, the son of Edmund's elder sister Anne de Mortimer. Along with his land and titles, Richard also inherited Mortimer's claim to the throne, which eventually led to the Wars of the Roses. After the Yorkist victory, Richard's son Edward of York was crowned Edward IV in 4 March 1461, and the Earldom of Ulster merged with the Crown.

The title of Earl of Ulster has subsequently been recreated six times for members of the Royal Family. The current incarnation of the title dates to 31 March 1928, when Prince Henry, the third son of King George V and Queen Mary, was simultaneously created Duke of Gloucester, Earl of Ulster and Baron Culloden in the Peerage of the United Kingdom.

== Earls Palatine of Ulster (1181) ==
- Sir John de Courcy, forfeit 1204

== Earl of Ulster, Peerage of Ireland, First Creation (1205) ==
- Hugh de Lacy, 1st Earl of Ulster (1176–1243)

== Earls of Ulster, Peerage of Ireland, Second Creation (1264) ==
- Walter de Burgh, 1st Earl of Ulster (died 1271)
- Richard Óg de Burgh, 2nd Earl of Ulster (1259–1326)
  - John de Burgh (died 1313), heir apparent to the earldom
- William Donn de Burgh, 3rd Earl of Ulster (1312–1333)
- Elizabeth de Burgh, Duchess of Clarence, 4th Countess of Ulster (1332–1363)
  - m. Lionel of Antwerp, 1st Duke of Clarence, jure uxoris Earl of Ulster (1338–1368)
- Philippa, Countess of March, 5th Countess of Ulster (1355–1382)
  - m. Edmund Mortimer, 3rd Earl of March, jure uxoris Earl of Ulster (1352–1381)
- Roger Mortimer, 4th Earl of March and 6th Earl of Ulster (1374–1398)
- Edmund Mortimer, 5th Earl of March and 7th Earl of Ulster (1391–1425)
- Richard of York, 3rd Duke of York, 8th Earl of Ulster (1411–1460)
- Edward of York, 4th Duke of York, 9th Earl of Ulster (1442–1483), merged in crown 1461

== Earl of Ulster, Peerage of Ireland, Third Creation (1659) ==
- James Stuart, Duke of York and Albany (1633–1701), merged in crown 1685

== Earl of Ulster, Peerage of Ireland, Fourth Creation (1716) ==
- Ernest Augustus of Brunswick-Lüneburg, Duke of York and Albany (1674–1728)

== Earl of Ulster, Peerage of Ireland, Fifth Creation (1760) ==
- Prince Edward, Duke of York and Albany (1739–1767)

== Earl of Ulster, Peerage of Ireland, Sixth Creation (1784) ==
- Prince Frederick, Duke of York and Albany (1763–1827)

== Earl of Ulster, Peerage of the United Kingdom, First Creation (1866) ==
- Prince Alfred, Duke of Edinburgh (1844–1900)

== Earls of Ulster, Peerage of the United Kingdom, Second Creation (1928) ==
- Prince Henry, 1st Duke of Gloucester (1900–1974)
- Prince Richard, 2nd Duke of Gloucester (born 1944)
  - Alexander Windsor (born 1974), Prince Richard's only son, is the heir apparent to the dukedom, and as such uses "Earl of Ulster" as a courtesy title.

== Family trees ==
Peerages of Albany, Arklow, Inverness, Ulster and York family tree

Earl of Ulster (1st Irish creation), 1205
Hugh de Lacy c. 1176–1271; Earl of Ulster
Earl of Ulster (2nd Irish creation), 1264
Maud de Lacy | Walter de Burgh c. 1210–1271; 1st Earl of Ulster, 2nd Lord of Connaught
Richard Óg de Burgh; 1259–1326; 2nd Earl of Ulster
John de Burgh d. 1313
Robert II of Scotland; 1316–1390 | Edward III of England; 1312–1377 | William Donn de Burgh; 1312–1333; 3rd Earl of Ulster
Lionel of Antwerp; 1338–1368; Duke of Clarence, Earl of Ulster (jure uxoris) | Elizabeth de Burgh; 1332–1363; 4th Countess of Ulster suo jure
Duke of Albany (1st creation), 1398 | Duke of York (1st creation), 1385
Robert III of Scotland; 1337–1406 | Robert Stewart c. 1340–1420; 1st Duke of Albany | Edmund of Langley; 1341–1402; 1st Duke of York | Philippa of Clarence; 1355–1382; 5th Countess of Ulster
Murdoch Stewart; 1362–1425; 2nd Duke of Albany | Roger Mortimer; 1374–1398; 6th Earl of Ulster, Earl of March
Dukedom of Albany (1st creation) forfeit, 1425
Edward of Norwich; 1373–1415; 2nd Duke of York | Richard of Conisburgh; 1375–1415; Earl of Cambridge | Anne Mortimer; 1388–c. 1411 | Edmund Mortimer; 1391–1425; 7th Earl of Ulster, Earl of March
James I of Scotland; 1394–1437 | Richard of York; 1411–1460; 3rd Duke of York, 8th Earl of Ulster, Earl of March
James II of Scotland; 1430–1460 | Prince Edward; 1442–1483; 4th Duke of York, 9th Earl of Ulster, Earl of March; Later Edward IV of England
Dukedom of York (1st creation) and Earldom of Ulster (2nd Irish creation) merged in the Crown, 1461
Duke of Albany (2nd creation), 1458 | Duke of York (2nd creation), 1474
Alexander Stewart; 1454–1485; 1st Duke of Albany | James III of Scotland; 1451–1488 | Elizabeth of York; 1466–1503 | Richard of Shrewsbury; 1473–1483; Duke of York
Dukedom of Albany (2nd creation) forfeit, 1479 restored, 1482 forfeited, 1483 | Dukedom of York (2nd creation) extinct, 1483
Duke of Albany (2nd creation) restored, 1515 | Duke of York (3rd creation), 1494
John Stewart; 1484–1536; 2nd Duke of Albany | James IV of Scotland; 1473–1513 | Margaret Tudor; 1489–1541 | Prince Henry; 1491–1547; Duke of York; Later Henry VIII of England
Dukedom of Albany (2nd creation) extinct, 1536 | Dukedom of York (3rd creation) merged in the Crown, 1509
James V of Scotland; 1512–1542
Duke of Albany (3rd creation), 1565
Prince Arthur Stewart; 1541 styled Duke of Albany | Mary, Queen of Scots; 1542–1587 | Henry Stuart, Lord Darnley; 1545–1567; 1st Duke of Albany
Prince James; 1566–1625; 2nd Duke of Albany; Later James VI & I of Scotland and England
Dukedom of Albany (3rd creation) merged in the Crown, 1567
Duke of Albany (4th creation), 1604; Duke of York (4th creation), 1605
Henry Frederick; 1594–1612 | Elizabeth Stuart; 1596–1662 | Prince Charles; 1600–1649; Duke of Albany, Duke of York; Later Charles I of Scotland and England
Dukedoms of York (4th creation) and Albany (4th creation) merged in the Crown, 1625
Duke of York (5th creation) 1644; Earl of Ulster (3rd Irish creation), 1659; Duke of Albany (5th creation), 1660
Sophia of Hanover; 1630–1714 | Charles II of Scotland and England; 1630–1685 | James Stuart; 1633–1701; Duke of York, Duke of Albany, Earl of Ulster; Later James II of Scotland and England
Dukedoms of Albany (5th creation) and York (5th creation), and Earldom of Ulster (3rd Irish creation) merged in the Crown, 1685
Duke of York and Albany (1st creation) and Earl of Ulster (4th Irish creation), 1716
George I of Great Britain; 1660–1727 | Ernest Augustus; 1674–1728; Prince-Bishop of Osnabrück, Duke of York and Albany, Earl of Ulster
Dukedom of York and Albany (1st creation) and Earldom of Ulster (4th Irish creation) extinct, 1728
George II of Great Britain; 1683–1760
Prince Frederick Louis; 1707–1751; Duke of Gloucester, Duke of Edinburgh
Duke of York and Albany (2nd creation) and Earl of Ulster (5th Irish creation), 1760
George III of the United Kingdom; 1738–1820 | Prince Edward; 1739–1767; Duke of York and Albany
Dukedom of York and Albany (2nd creation) and Earldom of Ulster (5th Irish creation) extinct, 1767
Duke of York and Albany (3rd creation) and Earl of Ulster (6th Irish creation), 1784 | Earl of Inverness (1st creation), and Baron Arklow (1st creation), 1801
George IV of the United Kingdom; 1762–1830 | Prince Frederick; 1763–1827; Duke of York and Albany | Prince Edward; 1767–1820; Duke of Kent and Strathearn | Prince Augustus Frederick; 1773–1843; Duke of Sussex, Earl of Inverness and Baron Arklow
Dukedom of York and Albany (3rd creation) and Earldom of Ulster (6th Irish creation) extinct, 1827 | Earldom of Inverness and Barony Arklow extinct, 1843
Queen Victoria of the United Kingdom; 1819–1901
Earl of Ulster (1st UK creation), 1866 | Duke of Albany (6th creation), Earl of Clarence, and Baron Arklow (2nd creation), 1881
Edward VII of the United Kingdom; 1841–1910 | Prince Alfred Ernest Albert; 1844–1900; Duke of Edinburgh, Duke of Saxe-Coburg and Gotha, Earl of Ulster | Prince Leopold; 1853–1884; Duke of Saxe-Coburg and Gotha, 1st Duke of Albany, Earl of Clarence, and Baron Arklow
Earldom of Ulster (1st UK creation) extinct, 1900
Duke of York (6th creation), Earl of Inverness (2nd creation) and Baron Killarney (1st creation), 1892
Prince Albert Victor; 1864–1892; Duke of Clarence and Avondale | Prince George; 1865–1936; Duke of York, Earl of Inverness, and Baron Killarney; Later George V of the United Kingdom | Charles Edward; 1884–1954; Duke of Saxe-Coburg and Gotha, 2nd Duke of Albany, Earl of Clarence, and Baron Arklow
Dukedom of York (6th creation), Earldom of Inverness (2nd creation), Barony Killarney (1st creation) merged in the Crown, 1910 | Dukedom of Albany (6th creation) forfeit, 1919
Duke of York (7th creation), Earl of Inverness (3rd creation) and Baron Killarney (2nd creation), 1920 | Earl of Ulster (2nd UK creation), 1928
Edward VIII of the United Kingdom; 1894–1972; Duke of Windsor | Prince Albert; 1895–1952; Duke of York; Later George VI of the United Kingdom | Prince Henry; 1900–1974; Duke of Gloucester, 1st Earl of Ulster
Dukedom of York (7th creation), Earldom of Inverness (3rd creation), Barony Killarney (2nd creation) merged in the Crown, 1936
Elizabeth II of the United Kingdom; 1926–2022
Duke of York (8th creation), Earl of Inverness (4th creation) and Baron Killyleagh, 1986
Charles III of the United Kingdom b. 1948 | Andrew Mountbatten-Windsor b. 1960; Duke of York, Earl of Inverness, and Baron Killyleagh | Prince Richard b. 1944; Duke of Gloucester, 2nd Earl of Ulster
Alexander Windsor b. 1974 styled Earl of Ulster
Heir apparent to the Earldom of Ulster

Family tree of the Dukes of Gloucester, Dukes of Edinburgh, the Dukes of Gloucester and Edinburgh, the Marquesses of Carisbrooke, and the Earls of Ulster (UK creations)

Edward III of England; 1312–1377
Duke of Gloucester (1st creation), 1385
John of Gaunt; 1340–1399; Duke of Lancaster | Thomas of Woodstock; 1355–1397; Duke of Gloucester
Dukedom of Gloucester (1st creation) extinct, 1397
Henry IV of England; 1367–1413 | John Beaufort; 1373–1410; 1st Earl of Somerset | Joan Beaufort c. 1379–1440
Duke of Gloucester (2nd creation), 1414
Humphrey of Lancaster; 1390–1447; Duke of Gloucester | John Beaufort; 1404–1444; Duke of Somerset | Cecily Neville; 1415–1495
Dukedom of Gloucester (2nd creation) extinct, 1447
Duke of Gloucester (3rd creation), 1461
Margaret Beaufort; 1443–1509 | Edward IV of England; 1442–1483 | Richard of York; 1452–1485; Duke of Gloucester; Later Richard III of England
Dukedom of Gloucester (3rd creation) merged in the Crown, 1483
Henry VII of England; 1457–1509 | Elizabeth of York; 1466–1503
Margaret Tudor; 1489–1541 | Henry VIII of England; 1491–1547
James V of Scotland; 1512–1542
Mary, Queen of Scots; 1542–1587
James VI & I of Scotland and England; 1566–1625
Princess Elizabeth Stuart; 1596–1662 | Charles I of Scotland and England; 1600–1649
Duke of Gloucester (4th creation), 1659
Sophia of Hanover; 1630–1714 | James II of Scotland and England; 1633–1701 | Prince Henry; 1640–1660; Duke of Gloucester
Dukedom of Gloucester (4th creation) extinct, 1660
George I of Great Britain; 1660–1727 | Anne of Great Britain; 1665–1714
George II of Great Britain; 1683–1760 | Prince William; 1689–1700 styled Duke of Gloucester
Duke of Edinburgh (1st creation), Marquess of the Isle of Ely, Earl of Eltham (1st creation), Viscount Launceston, and Baron Snowdon, 1726
Prince Frederick Louis; 1707–1751; 1st Duke of Edinburgh, etc., styled Duke of Gloucester until created Duke of Edinburgh, 1726
Duke of Gloucester and Edinburgh, 1764
Prince George William Frederick; 1738–1820; 2nd Duke of Edinburgh, etc. Later George III of Great Britain, later the United Kingdom | Prince William Henry; 1743–1805; 1st Duke of Gloucester and Edinburgh
Dukedom of Edinburgh (1st creation) and subsidiary titles merged in the Crown, 1760 | Dukedom of Gloucester and Edinburgh unused, 1805–1816
William IV of the United Kingdom; 1765–1837 | Prince Edward; 1767–1820; Duke of Kent and Strathearn | Princess Mary; 1776–1857 | Prince William Frederick; 1776–1834; 2nd Duke of Gloucester and Edinburgh
Dukedom of Gloucester and Edinburgh extinct, 1834
Queen Victoria of the United Kingdom; 1819–1901
Duke of Edinburgh (2nd creation) and Earl of Ulster (UK, 1st creation), 1866
Princess Alice; 1843–1878 | Edward VII of the United Kingdom; 1841–1910 | Prince Alfred Ernest Albert; 1844–1900; Duke of Saxe-Coburg and Gotha, Duke of Edinburgh, etc. | Princess Beatrice; 1857–1944
Dukedom of Edinburgh (2nd creation) and subsidiary title extinct, 1900
Marquess of Carisbrooke, Earl of Berkhampstead, Viscount Launceston, 1917
Princess Victoria of Hesse and by Rhine; 1863–1950 | George V of the United Kingdom; 1865–1936 | Alexander Albert Mountbatten; 1886–1960; Marquess of Carisbrooke, etc.
Marquessate of Carisbrooke and subsidiary titles extinct, 1960
Duke of Gloucester (5th creation), Earl of Ulster (UK, 2nd creation), Baron Culloden (2nd creation), 1928
Princess Alice of Battenberg; 1885–1969 | George VI of the United Kingdom; 1895–1952 | Prince Henry; 1900–1974; 1st Duke of Gloucester, etc.
Duke of Edinburgh (3rd creation), 1947
Prince Philip; 1921–2021; 1st Duke of Edinburgh | Elizabeth II of the United Kingdom; 1926–2022
Duke of Edinburgh (4th creation), 2023
Prince Charles b. 1948; 2nd Duke of Edinburgh; Later Charles III of the United Kingdom | Prince Edward b. 1964; Duke of Edinburgh, Earl of Wessex, Earl of Forfar, and Viscount Severn | Prince Richard b. 1944; 2nd Duke of Gloucester, etc.
Dukedom of Edinburgh (3rd creation) merged in the Crown, 2022 | Dukedom of Edinburgh (4th creation) is a life peerage and therefore not hereditary
Alexander Windsor b. 1974 styled Earl of Ulster
Heir-apparent to the Dukedom of Gloucester
Xan Windsor b. 2007 styled Baron Culloden

== See also ==
- House of Burgh, an Anglo-Norman and Hiberno-Norman dynasty founded in 1193
- Lord of the Glens
- Twescard
