= Leicester House, Westminster =

Aristocratic townhouse in Westminster, London

Coordinates: 51°30′40″N 00°07′50″W

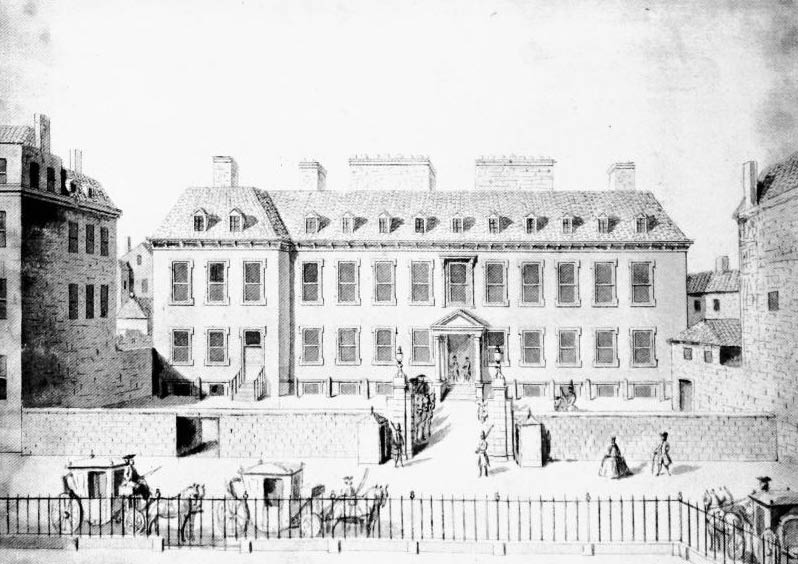
Leicester House in an engraving of 1748

Leicester House was a large aristocratic townhouse in Westminster, Middlesex, to the north of Leister Fields, now Leicester Square. Built by the Earl of Leicester and completed in 1635, it was later occupied by Elizabeth Stuart, a daughter of King James VI of Scotland and I of England and a former Queen of Bohemia, and in the 18th century by the two successive Hanoverian princes of Wales.

From 1775 to 1788, the Leverian collection was on display in Leicester House. The house was sold and demolished in 1791.

== History ==
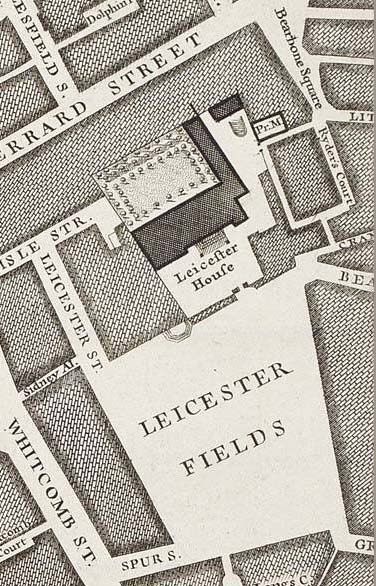
Leicester House & Fields

Leicester House was named for Robert Sidney, 2nd Earl of Leicester, who bought four acres of land in this part of Westminster, St Martin's Field, intending to build a new town house there. The area was not then built up, and the only nearby buildings were the armoury of the Military Company in Westminster to the north and the new town house of Sir William Howard, called Newport House, to the east. In August 1631, King Charles I ordered his Attorney General, Robert Heath, to prepare a licence for Leicester to build a house "with necessary outhouses buildinges and gardens", but this stipulated that the outer walls must be wholly of brick or stone and added also "the forefronts to bee made in that uniforme sort and order as may best bewtifie the place".

The house was completed about 1635, according to Lord Leicester at a total cost of £8,000, equivalent to £1,547,132 in 2025. Works to complete the interiors were managed by Dorothy Sidney, Countess of Leicester, in 1636 and 1637, and her letters mention a balcony and a railing on the roof. She bought beds and other furnishings.

A map of 1658 by Richard Newcourt and William Faithorne shows the house as an asymmetrical group of buildings around a courtyard, with a huge gatehouse taking up most of the southern range. This is very different from the house pictured in 1727 by Sutton Nicholls, and nothing is known which records a rebuilding. However, what is shown on the map of 1658 may simply be intended as a cartographic symbol for a great house. To build the house and its outbuildings, Lord Leicester had had to enclose some of his four acres, all of which was common land in the parish of St Martin in the Fields. The commoners appealed to the king, who appointed three members of the Privy Council to arbitrate. They ordered that the part of the land still unenclosed be kept open, and this became known as Leicester Fields.

From April to August 1640, the new house was occupied by Thomas Wentworth, 1st Earl of Strafford, soon after his return from meetings in Dublin as Lord Deputy of Ireland. Development in and around London and Westminster continued during the 17th century, and the size and importance of Lord Leicester's house encouraged the building of other smart town houses nearby.

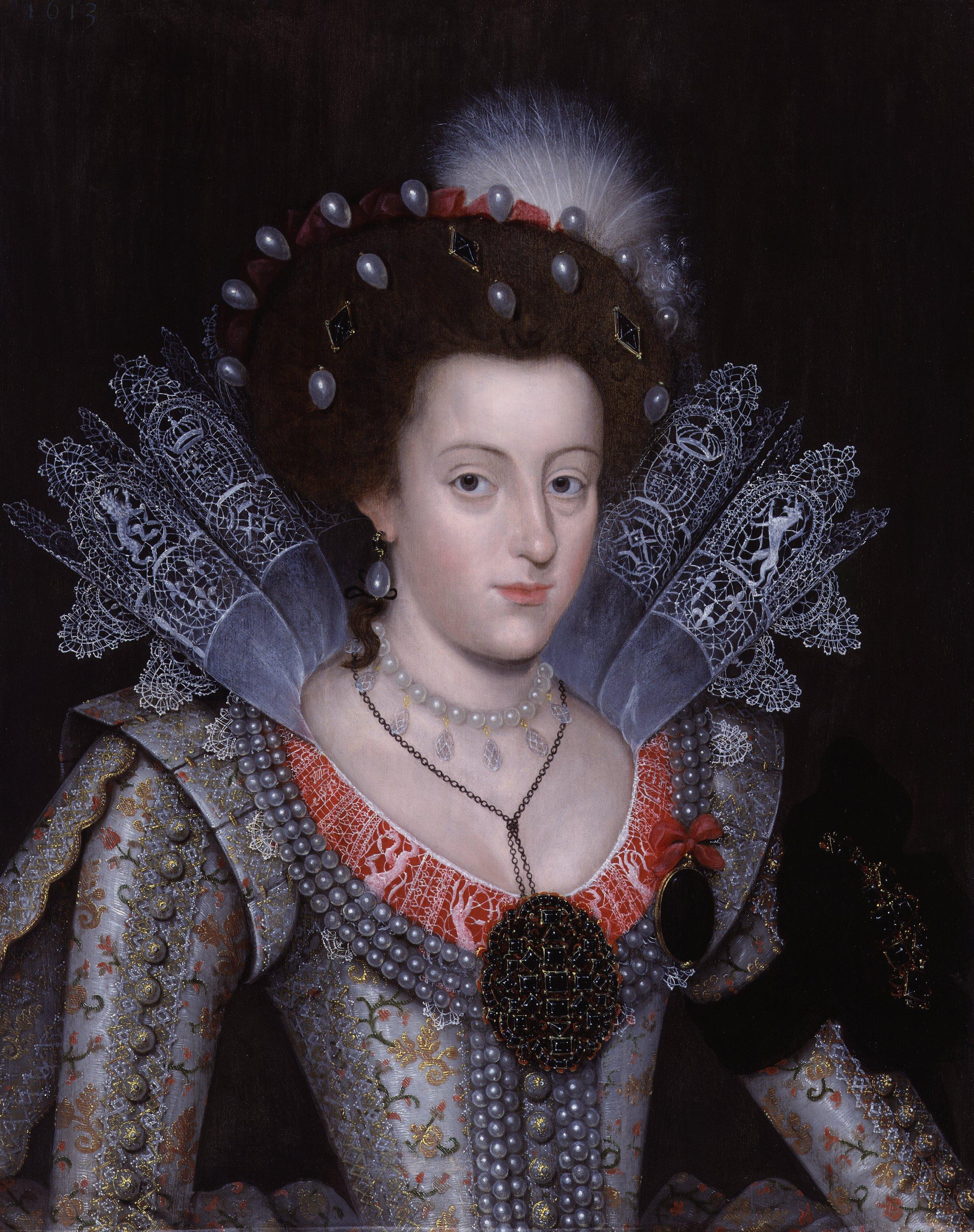
Elizabeth Stuart, who died in the house

For a short time in 1662, Leicester House was occupied by Elizabeth Stuart, Queen of Bohemia, the eldest daughter of James VI and I and the mother of Prince Rupert of the Rhine and Electress Sophia of Hanover; Elizabeth Stuart died in the house on 13 February 1662, Thomas Allen later noting that she "ended her unfortunate life" there. In 1672, Lady Sunderland, the wife of Robert Spencer, 2nd Earl of Sunderland, Lord Leicester's grandson, gave a dinner at the house attended by John Evelyn, who recalled that afterwards a fire-eater called Richardson entertained the company and "before us devour'd Brimston on glowing coales, chewing and swallowing them downe."

In 1674, Ralph, Lord Montagu, Master of the Great Wardrobe and later first Duke of Montagu, took a lease on Leicester House, after marrying Lady Northumberland, the widow of Josceline Percy, 11th Earl of Northumberland, a nephew of Lady Leicester. In 1676 Montagu was sent as English ambassador to Paris and ended his occupation of the house. In 1677, the elderly Robert Sidney, 2nd Earl of Leicester, died and was succeeded by his son Philip Sidney, who sold a large area of the garden for building Leicester Street, Lisle Street, and part of what is now Leicester Square. He also built a tavern in front of the courtyard and died in the house in 1698.

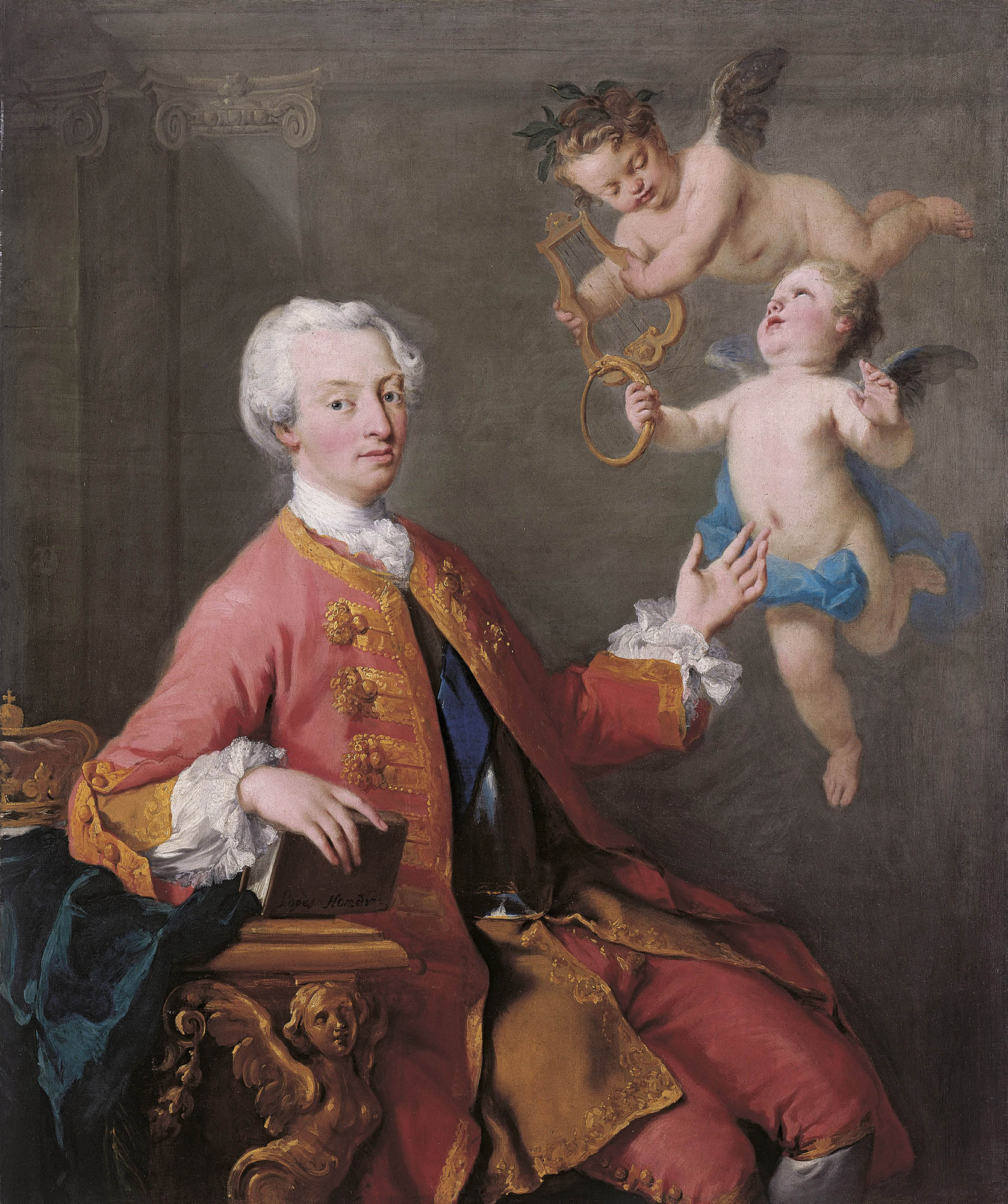
Frederick, Prince of Wales

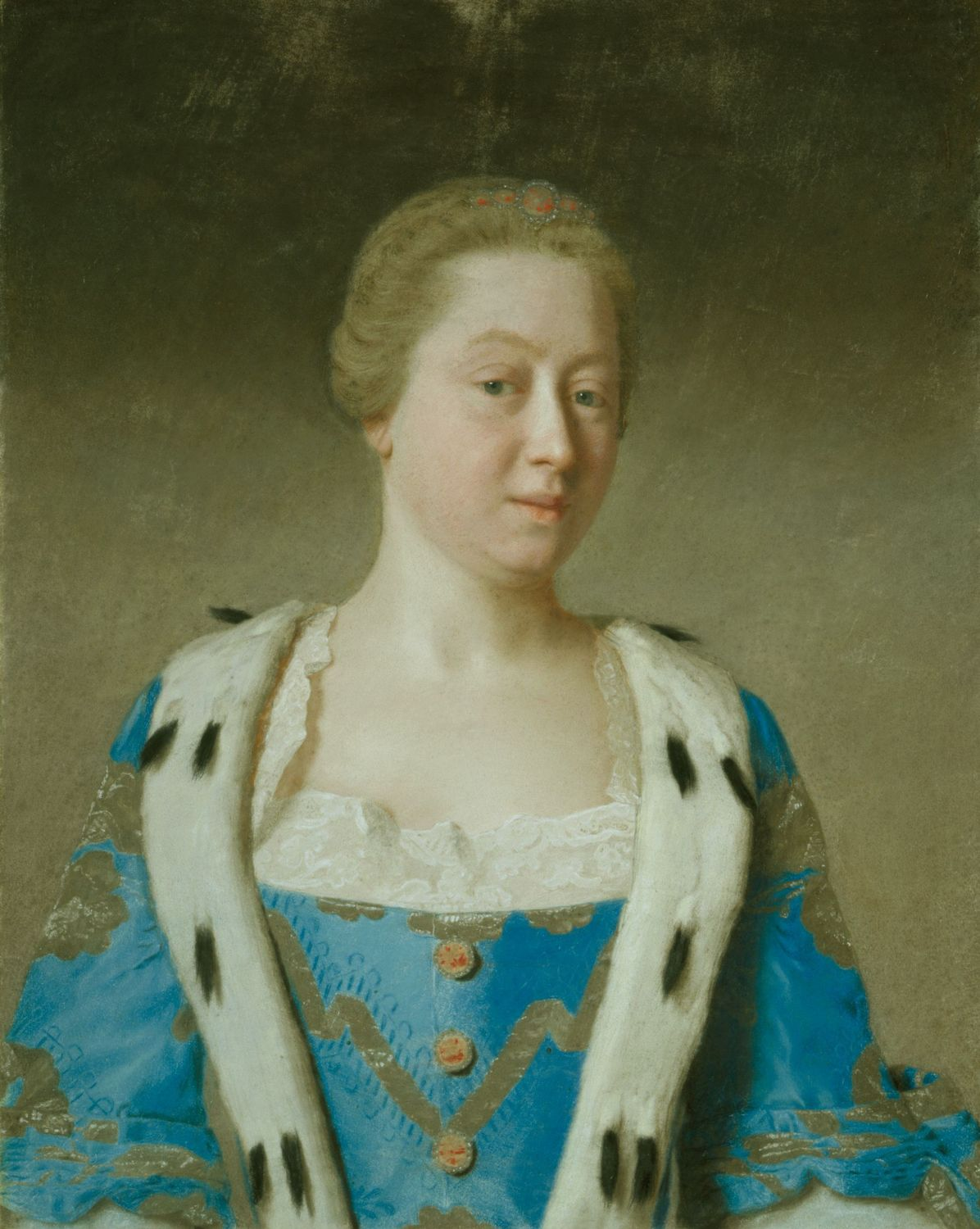
Augusta, Princess of Wales

About November 1742, Frederick, Prince of Wales, the eldest son of King George II, moved into the house, after agreeing to lease it. In July 1743 Jocelyn Sidney, 7th Earl of Leicester, died without a successor, and the house was inherited by two sisters, Lady Sherard and Elizabeth Perry. On 16 August 1743, they granted a fourteen-year lease to the prince, running from Michaelmas of 1742, and in 1744 Elizabeth Perry paid her sister £4,000 for her half-share. The successive Princes of Wales were natural alternative centres of political opposition, and the term "Leicester House faction" was used to describe the public men who were swayed by the Princes of Wales holding court there. On Frederick's death in 1751, the lease was inherited by his son the future George III, who was a minor, and for some twenty years Frederick's widow Augusta, Princess of Wales, continued the tradition of an alternative court at Leicester House.

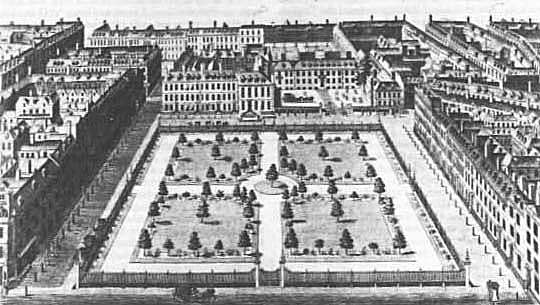
A view showing the house, c. 1750

In 1774, Sir Ashton Lever took a lease on the house, converting the rooms on the first floor into a single large gallery running the length of the house, and in February 1775 he opened a museum to display his Leverian collection. It had around 25,000 exhibits, said to be a small fraction of Lever's collections, and remained at Leicester House until 1788. Thanks to his mounting debts, George, Prince of Wales, the future George IV, sold the freehold of the house. After it was demolished in 1791, the house and its gardens were redeveloped as numbers 7–15, Leicester Square (on its north side), and some new houses on Leicester Place, Leicester Street, Lisle Street, and Sidney Street (now Sidney Place).

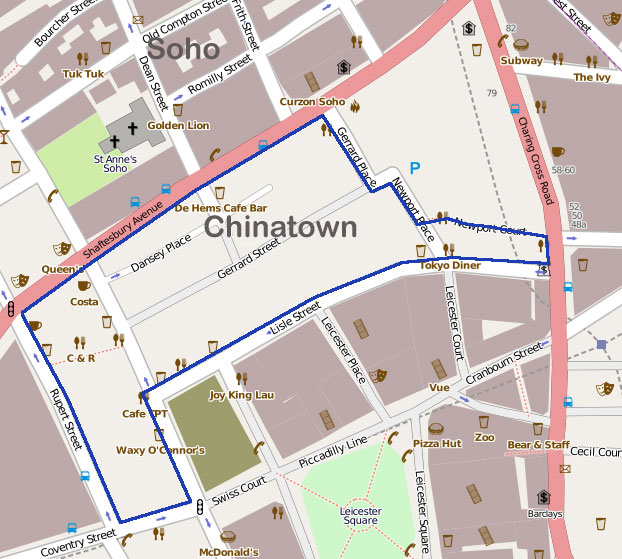
The site of the house now adjoins Chinatown

After the redevelopment, the area lost prestige and became an entertainment and shopping district.

When the main house was pulled down, some of its stables became part of a new property on Lisle Street built between 1792 and 1795, later known as the White Bear Yard livery stables. These survived until demolished in 1906.
