= Alexander Windsor, Earl of Ulster =

Son of Prince Richard, Duke of Gloucester

Major Earl of Ulster
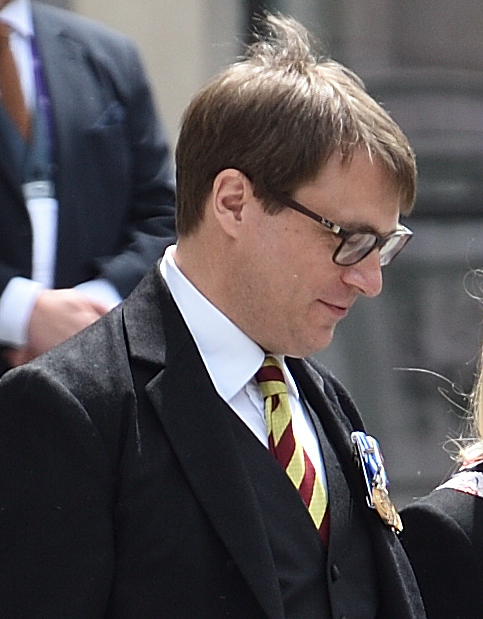
- Windsor in 2022
- Born: Alexander Patrick Gregers Richard Windsor; 24 October 1974 (age 51); St Mary's Hospital, London, England
- Other name: Alex Ulster
- Education: Eton College; King's College London; Royal Military Academy Sandhurst
- Spouse: Claire Booth (m. 2002)
- Children: 2
- Parent(s): Prince Richard, Duke of Gloucester; Birgitte van Deurs Henriksen
- Relatives: House of Windsor
- Military career
- Allegiance: United Kingdom
- Branch: British Army
- Service years: 1998–2008
- Rank: Major
- Units: King's Royal Hussars
- Conflicts: Kosovo War; Iraq War
- Awards: see Honours

Alexander Patrick Gregers Richard Windsor, Earl of Ulster (born 24 October 1974), is a member of the British royal family and the only son of Prince Richard, Duke of Gloucester, and Birgitte, Duchess of Gloucester. He is the heir apparent to the dukedom of Gloucester and is the second cousin of Charles III. He is also sometimes referred to as Alex Ulster.

== Early life and education ==
Alexander Patrick Gregers Richard Windsor was born prematurely on 24 October 1974 at St Mary's Hospital, London. He is the only son of Prince Richard, Duke of Gloucester, and Birgitte, Duchess of Gloucester. As of August 2026, he is 34th in the line of succession to the British throne.

Alexander attended Eton College and later graduated with a degree in war studies from King's College London in 1996. He subsequently trained at the Royal Military Academy Sandhurst.

== Military career ==
Alexander was commissioned in the King's Royal Hussars on 10 April 1998 as a subaltern (second lieutenant) with seniority from 14 April 1995; he was given the service number 548299. He was promoted to lieutenant on 10 April 1998 with seniority from 14 April 1997, and to the rank of captain on 16 October 2000. He saw active service in Northern Ireland, Kosovo and Iraq. On 14 January 2003, he transferred from a Short Service Commission to an Intermediate Regular Commission. On 28 April 2008, he was appointed to the Reserve of Officers, signalling his retirement from the British Army with the rank of acting major.

Since leaving the army, he has worked in non-governmental organisation roles and is a director of the Transnational Crisis Project.

== Marriage and family ==
On 22 June 2002, Alexander married Claire Booth, a physician, at the Queen's Chapel, St James's Palace. Lady Ulster is a professor of Gene Therapy and Paediatric Immunology at University College London's Great Ormond Street Institute of Child Health. The couple have two children:

- Xan Richard Anders Windsor, Lord Culloden (born 12 March 2007)
- Lady Cosima Rose Alexandra Windsor (born 20 May 2010)

Alexander continues to make public appearances at state events alongside other members of the extended royal family, including the 2022 state funeral of Queen Elizabeth II and the 2023 coronation of King Charles III and Queen Camilla.

== Honours ==
Ribbons of Earl of Ulster

Country	Date	Appointment	Ribbon	Other
United Kingdom	6 February 1977	Queen Elizabeth II Silver Jubilee Medal		
NATO	22 May 1998	NATO Kosovo Medal		
United Kingdom	6 February 2002	Queen Elizabeth II Golden Jubilee Medal		
United Kingdom	6 February 2012	Queen Elizabeth II Diamond Jubilee Medal		
United Kingdom	6 February 2022	Queen Elizabeth II Platinum Jubilee Medal		
United Kingdom	6 May 2023	King Charles III Coronation Medal		
United Kingdom		General Service Medal		
United Kingdom		Iraq Medal		

Alexander Windsor, Earl of Ulster
Lines of succession
Preceded by The Duke of Gloucester	Succession to the British throne Earl of Ulster grandson of Henry great-grandson of George V	Followed by Lord Culloden
Orders of precedence in the United Kingdom
Preceded by The Duke of Fife	Gentlemen; Earl of Ulster	Succeeded by Earl of St Andrews
