= Charles Stuart, Duke of Cambridge (1660–1661) =

Charles Stuart
- Duke of Cambridge
- Born: 22 October 1660; Worcester House, London, England
- Died: 5 May 1661 (aged 6 months 13 days); Whitehall Palace, London, England
- Burial: 6 May 1661; Westminster Abbey
- House: Stuart
- Father: James, Duke of York (later James II & VII)
- Mother: Anne Hyde

Charles Stuart (22 October 1660 – 5 May 1661) was the first of four sons and eight children born from the marriage between the Duke of York (later King James II of England & VII of Scotland) and his first wife, Anne Hyde. He was styled Duke of Cambridge, but never formally created so, as he died before his first birthday. He was second in line to the English and Scottish thrones.

== Life ==
Charles was born on 22 October 1660, as the first child of James, Duke of York (later King James VII & II), and his wife Anne Hyde. Charles was styled as Duke of Cambridge, a title that had never been granted until his birth. Charles was conceived seven months before his parents' marriage and if royal advisors and his paternal grandmother, Queen Henrietta Maria, had had their way, he could have been declared illegitimate. King Charles II, James's older brother, approved of the marriage and the wedding between James and Anne was held on 3 September 1660 in London. Charles was baptized on 1 January 1661 at Worcester House.

Although Cambridge's father James was heir presumptive, it seemed unlikely that he'd inherit the Crown, as Cambridge's uncle, the reigning Charles II, was still a young man who was capable of fathering children of his own. And though Charles II didn't end up having any legitimate children, Charles, Duke of Cambridge never ended up becoming King himself, as he died on 5 May 1661, before reaching the age of one, after becoming ill with smallpox. He was buried in Westminster Abbey the following day. The duke's death would be the first in a series of most of King James VII & II's legitimate children dying young. Three of his younger brothers, likewise short-lived, were also called Duke of Cambridge: James, Edgar, and Charles. His younger sisters, Mary II and Anne, became Queens respectively.

== Arms ==
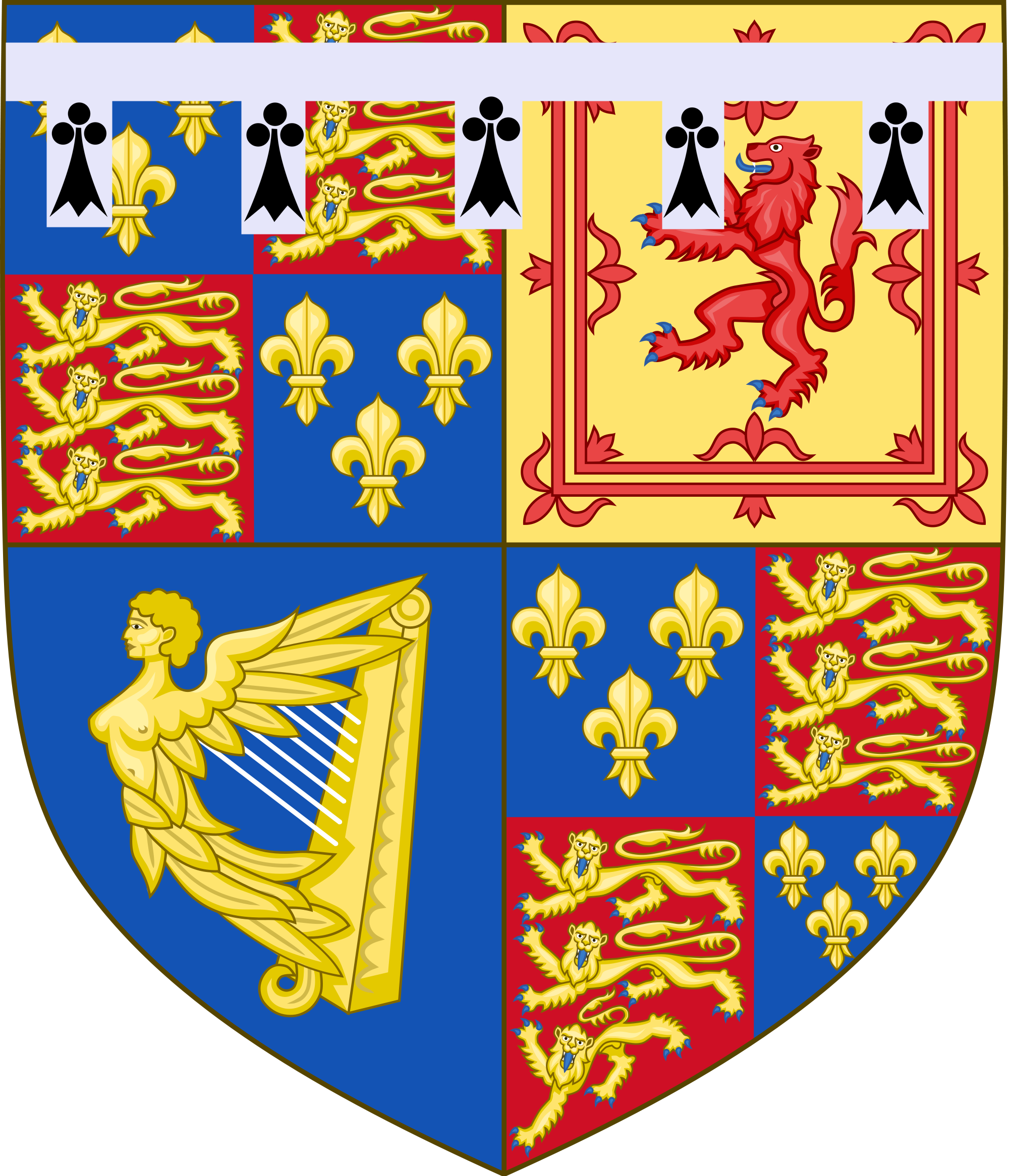
Coat of arms as Duke of Cambridge

As a grandson of a British sovereign, Charles bore a coat of arms consisting those of the kingdom, differenced by a label argent of five points ermine.

== Bibliography ==
- Callow, John (2000). The Making of King James II: The Formative Years of a King. Sutton. ISBN 0-7509-2398-9.
- Panton, Kenneth J. (2011). Historical Dictionary of the British Monarchy. G - Reference, Information and Interdisciplinary Subjects Series. Scarecrow Press. ISBN 978-0-8108-5779-7.

Charles Stuart, Duke of Cambridge (1660–1661) House of Stuart Cadet branch of the Clan Stewart Born: 22 October 1660 Died: 5 May 1661
Peerage of England
New title	Duke of Cambridge; 22 October 1660 – 5 May 1661	Vacant Title next held by James Stuart

Family tree of Dukes and Marquesses of Cambridge

King James VI and I (1566–1625)
Elizabeth Stuart (1596–1662); Queen of Bohemia	King Charles I (1600–1649)
Duke of Gloucester (4th creation) and Earl of Cambridge (5th creation), 1659
Sophia of Hanover (1630–1714)	King Charles II (1630–1685)	King James VII and II (1633–1701)	Henry Stuart (1640–1660); Duke of Gloucester, Earl of Cambridge
Dukedom of Gloucester (4th creation) and Earl of Cambridge (5th creation) extinct, 1660
Duke of Cambridge (1st creation), Earl of Cambridge (6th creation), and Baron of Dauntsey (1st creation), 1664	Duke of Cambridge (2nd creation), Earl of Cambridge (7th creation), and Baron of Dauntsey (2nd creation), 1667
King George I (1660–1727)	Charles Stuart (1660–1661) styled Duke of Cambridge	James Stuart (1663–1667); Duke of Cambridge, Earl of Cambridge, Baron of Dauntsey	Edgar Stuart (1667–1671); Duke of Cambridge, Earl of Cambridge, Baron of Dauntsey	Charles Stuart (1677) styled Duke of Cambridge
Dukedom of Cambridge (1st creation), Earldom of Cambridge (6th creation), and Barony of Dauntsey (1st creation) extinct, 1667	Dukedom of Cambridge (2nd creation), Earldom of Cambridge (7th creation), and Barony of Dauntsey (2nd creation) extinct,, 1671
Duke of Cambridge (3rd creation) and Marquess of Cambridge (1st creation), 1706
Prince George (1683–1760); Duke and Marquess of Cambridge later King George II
Dukedom of Cambridge (3rd creation) and Marquessate of Cambridge (1st creation) merged with the Crown, 1727
Prince Frederick (1707–1751); Prince of Wales
George III (1738–1820)
Duke of Cambridge (4th creation), Earl of Tipperary and Baron Culloden (1st creation), 1801
Prince Edward (1767–1820); Duke of Kent and Strathearn	Prince Adolphus (1774–1850); 1st Duke of Cambridge, 1st Earl of Tipperary, 1st Baron Culloden
Queen Victoria (1819–1901)	Prince George (1819–1904); 2nd Duke of Cambridge, 2nd Earl of Tipperary, 2nd Baron Culloden	Princess Mary Adelaide of Cambridge (1833–1897)
Dukedom of Cambridge (4th creation), Earldom of Tipperary, and Barony Culloden (1st creation extinct, 1904
King Edward VII (1841–1910)
Marquess of Cambridge (2nd creation), Earl of Eltham (1st creation), and Viscount Northallerton, 1917
King George V (1865–1936)	Mary of Teck (1867–1953)	Adolphus Cambridge (1868–1927); Duke of Teck, 1st Marquess of Cambridge, 1st Earl of Eltham, 1st Viscount Northallerton
King Edward VIII (1894–1972)	King George VI (1895–1952)	George Francis Hugh Cambridge (1895–1981); 2nd Marquess of Cambridge, 2nd Earl of Eltham, 2nd Viscount Northallerton
Marquessate of Cambridge (2nd creation), Earldom of Eltham (2nd creation), Viscountcy Northallerton extinct, 1981
Queen Elizabeth II (1926–2022)
King Charles III (b. 1948)
Duke of Cambridge (5th creation), Earl of Strathearn (Mountbatten-Windsor line), and Baron Carrickfergus, 2011
Prince William (b. 1982); Prince of Wales, Duke of Cornwall, Duke of Rothesay, Duke of Cambridge, Earl of Strathearn, Earl of Chester, Baron Carrickfergus
Prince George of Wales (b. 2013)
Heir apparent to the Dukedom of Cambridge
