= George II of Great Britain =

King of Great Britain and Ireland from 1727 to 1760

George II
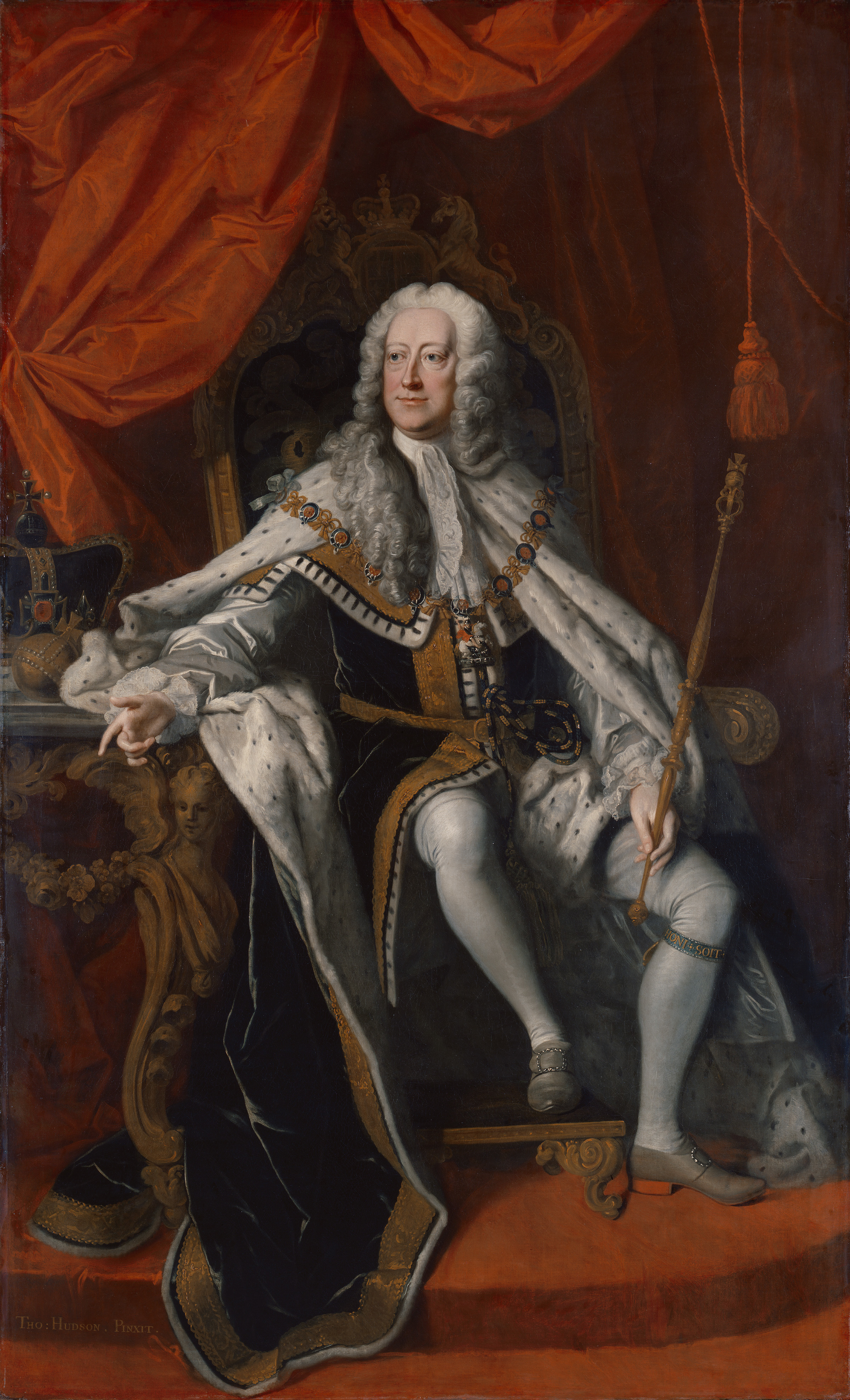
- Portrait of George II by Thomas Hudson, 1744

King of Great Britain and Ireland; Elector of Hanover
- Reign: 11/22 (Note: Over the course of George's life, two calendars were used: the Old Style Julian calendar and the New Style Gregorian calendar. Before 1700, the two calendars were 10 days apart. Hanover switched from the Julian to the Gregorian calendar on 19 February (O.S.) / 1 March (N.S.) 1700. Great Britain switched on 3/14 September 1752. George was born on 30 October Old Style, which was 9 November New Style, but because the calendar shifted forward a further day in 1700, the date is occasionally miscalculated as 10 November. In this article, individual dates before September 1752 are indicated as either O.S. or N.S. or both. All dates after September 1752 are N.S. only. All years are assumed to start from 1 January and not 25 March, which was the English New Year.) June 1727 – 25 October 1760
- Coronation: 11/22 October 1727
- Predecessor: George I
- Successor: George III
- Born: 30 October / 9 November 1683; Herrenhausen Palace, or Leine Palace, Hanover
- Died: 25 October 1760 (aged 76); Kensington Palace, London, England
- Burial: 11 November 1760; Westminster Abbey, London
- Spouse: Caroline of Brandenburg-Ansbach (m. 1705; died 1737)
- Issue Detail: Frederick, Prince of Wales; Anne, Princess of Orange; Princess Amelia; Princess Caroline; Prince George William; Prince William, Duke of Cumberland; Mary, Landgravine of Hesse-Kassel; Louisa, Queen of Denmark and Norway
Names
- George Augustus (German: Georg August)
- House: Hanover
- Father: George I of Great Britain
- Mother: Sophia Dorothea of Celle
- Religion: Protestant

George II (George Augustus; German: Georg August; 30 October / 9 November 1683 – 25 October 1760) was King of Great Britain and Ireland, Duke of Brunswick-Lüneburg (Hanover) and a prince-elector of the Holy Roman Empire from 11 June 1727 (O.S.) until his death in 1760.

Born and brought up in northern Germany, George is the most recent British monarch born outside Great Britain. The Act of Settlement 1701 and the Acts of Union 1707 positioned his grandmother Sophia of Hanover and her Protestant descendants to inherit the British throne. In 1705, George married Princess Caroline of Brandenburg-Ansbach, with whom he had eight children. After the deaths of George's grandmother and Anne, Queen of Great Britain, George's father, the Elector of Hanover, ascended the British throne as George I in 1714. In the first years of his father's reign as king, Prince George was associated with opposition politicians until they rejoined the governing party.

As king from 1727, George exercised little control over British domestic policy, which was largely controlled by the Parliament of Great Britain. As elector he spent twelve summers in Hanover, where he had more direct control over government policy. He had a difficult relationship with his eldest son, Frederick, who supported the parliamentary opposition. During the War of the Austrian Succession, George participated at the Battle of Dettingen, and thus became the most recent British monarch to lead an army in battle. Supporters of the Stuart claimant to the British throne, James, attempted and failed to depose George in the Jacobite rising of 1745 led by James's son. Prince Frederick died suddenly in 1751, before his father, and George was succeeded by Frederick's eldest son, George III.

For two centuries after George II's death, historians tended to view him with disdain, concentrating on his mistresses, short temper, and boorishness. Since then, reassessment of his legacy has led scholars to conclude that he exercised more influence in foreign policy and military appointments than previously thought.

== Early life ==
=== Birth and family ===
George as a young boy with his mother and sister

George was born in the city of Hanover in Germany, followed by his sister, Sophia Dorothea, three years later. Their parents, George Louis, Hereditary Prince of Brunswick-Lüneburg (later King George I of Great Britain), and Sophia Dorothea of Celle, both committed adultery. In 1694 the marriage was dissolved on the pretext that Sophia Dorothea had abandoned her husband. She was confined to Ahlden House and denied access to her two children, who probably never saw their mother again.

George spoke only French, the language of diplomacy and the court, until the age of four, after which he was taught German by one of his tutors, Johann Hilmar Holstein. In addition to French and German, he also learned English and Italian, and studied genealogy, military history, and battle tactics with particular diligence.

George's second cousin once removed, Queen Anne, ascended the thrones of England, Scotland, and Ireland in 1702. Though she had had seventeen pregnancies, of which five resulted in live births, her only surviving child died in 1700. By the Act of Settlement 1701, therefore, the English Parliament designated Anne's closest Protestant blood relations, George's grandmother Sophia and her descendants, as Anne's heirs in England and Ireland. Consequently, after his grandmother and father, George was third in line to succeed Anne in two of her three realms. He was naturalized as an English subject in 1705 by the Sophia Naturalization Act, and in 1706 he was made a Knight of the Garter and created Duke and Marquess of Cambridge, Earl of Milford Haven, Viscount Northallerton, and Baron Tewkesbury in the Peerage of England. England and Scotland united in 1707 to form the Kingdom of Great Britain, and jointly accepted the succession as laid down by the English Act of Settlement.

=== Marriage ===
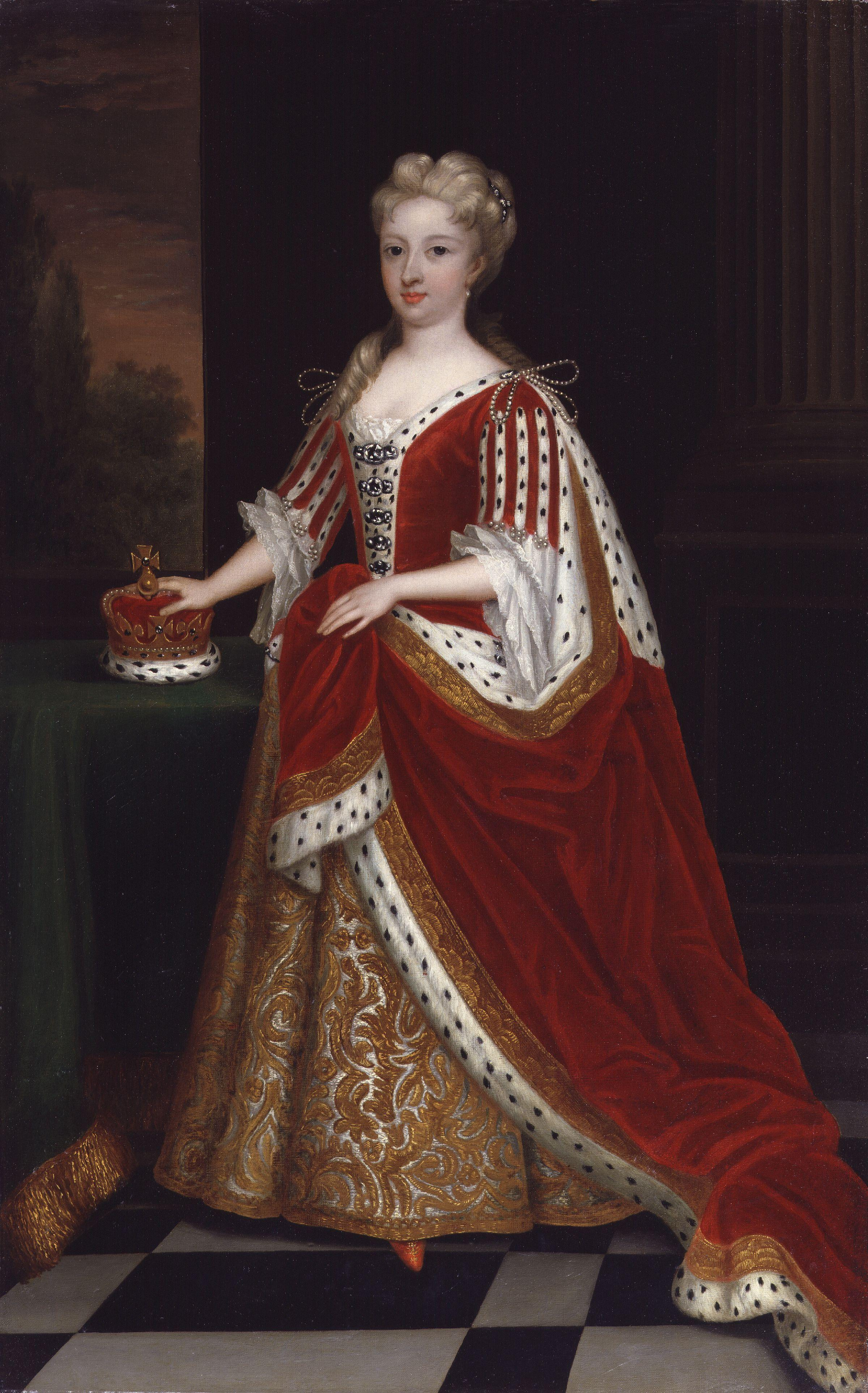
Princess Caroline by Godfrey Kneller, 1716

George's father did not want his son to enter into a loveless arranged marriage as he had and wanted him to have the opportunity of meeting his bride before any formal arrangements were made. Negotiations from 1702 for the hand of Princess Hedvig Sophia of Sweden, Dowager Duchess and regent of Holstein-Gottorp, came to nothing. In June 1705, under the false name "Monsieur de Busch", George visited the Ansbach court at its summer residence in Triesdorf to investigate incognito a marriage prospect: Princess Caroline of Ansbach, the former ward of his aunt Queen Sophia Charlotte of Prussia. The English envoy to Hanover, Edmund Poley, reported that George was so taken by "the good character he had of her that he would not think of anybody else". A marriage contract was concluded by the end of July. On 22 August / 2 September 1705 Caroline arrived in Hanover for her wedding, which was held the same evening in the chapel at Herrenhausen Palace.

George was keen to participate in the war against France in Flanders, but his father refused to let him join the army in an active role until he had a son and heir. In early 1707 George's hopes were fulfilled when Caroline gave birth to a son, Frederick. In July Caroline fell seriously ill with smallpox, and George caught the infection after staying by her side devotedly during her illness. They both recovered. In 1708 George participated in the Battle of Oudenarde in the vanguard of the Hanoverian cavalry; his horse and a colonel immediately beside him were killed, but George survived unharmed. The British commander, Marlborough, wrote that George "distinguished himself extremely, charging at the head of and animating by his example [the Hanoverian] troops, who played a good part in this happy victory". Between 1709 and 1713 George and Caroline had three daughters: Anne, Amelia, and Caroline.

By 1714 Queen Anne's health had declined, and British Whigs, who supported the Hanoverian succession, thought it prudent for one of the Hanoverians to live in England to safeguard the Protestant succession on Anne's death. As George was a peer of the realm (as Duke of Cambridge), it was suggested that he be summoned to Parliament to sit in the House of Lords. Both Anne and George's father refused to support the plan, although George, Caroline, and Sophia were all in favour. George did not go. Within the year both Sophia and Anne were dead, and George's father was king.

== Prince of Wales ==
=== Quarrel with the King ===
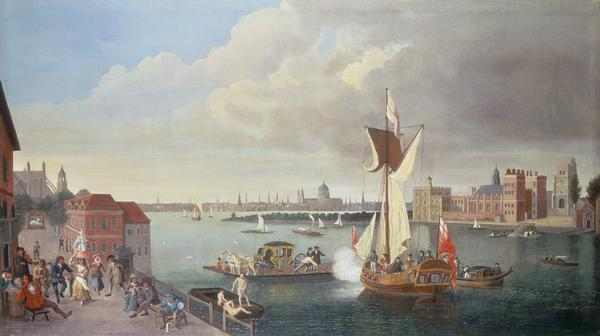
London, c. 1710

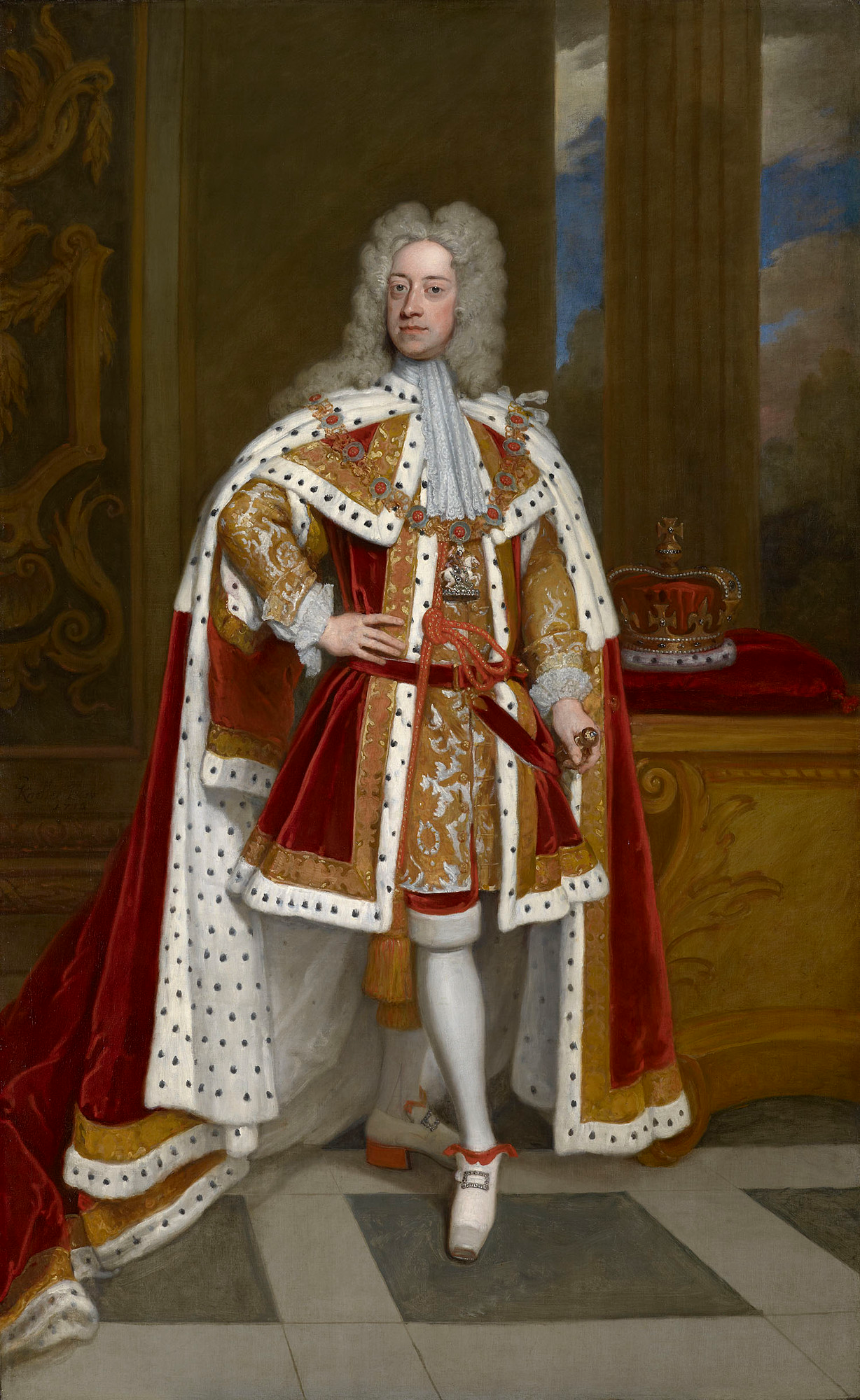
Portrait by Kneller, 1716

George and his father sailed for England from The Hague on 16/27 September 1714 and arrived at Greenwich two days later. The following day, they formally entered London in a ceremonial procession. George was given the title of Prince of Wales. Caroline followed her husband to Britain in October with their daughters, while Frederick remained in Hanover to be brought up by private tutors. London was like nothing George had seen before; it was 50 times larger than Hanover, (Note: Hanover had about 1,800 houses, whereas London had 100,000.) and the crowd was estimated at up to one and a half million spectators. George courted popularity with voluble expressions of praise for the English, and claimed that he had no drop of blood that was not English.

In July 1716, the King returned to Hanover for six months, and George was given limited powers, as "Guardian and Lieutenant of the Realm", to govern in his father's absence. He made a royal progress through Chichester, Havant, Portsmouth, and Guildford in southern England. Spectators were allowed to see him dine in public at Hampton Court Palace. An attempt on his life at the Theatre Royal, Drury Lane, in which one person was shot dead before the assailant was brought under control, boosted his high public profile.

The King distrusted or was jealous of George's popularity, which contributed to the development of a poor relationship between them. The birth in 1717 of George's second son, George William, proved to be a catalyst for a family quarrel; the King, supposedly following custom, appointed Lord Chamberlain Thomas Pelham-Holles, 1st Duke of Newcastle, as one of the baptismal sponsors of the child. The King was angered when George, who disliked Newcastle, verbally insulted the Duke at the christening, which the Duke misunderstood as a challenge to a duel. (Note: George shook his fist at Newcastle and said "You are a rascal; I shall find you out!", which the Duke apparently misheard as "You are a rascal; I shall fight you!") George and Caroline were temporarily confined to their apartments on the order of the King, who subsequently banished his son from St James's Palace, the King's residence. The Prince and Princess of Wales left court, but their children remained in the care of the King.

George and Caroline missed their children, and were desperate to see them. On one occasion, they secretly visited the palace without the approval of the King; Caroline fainted and George "cried like a child". The King partially relented and permitted them to visit once a week, though he later allowed Caroline unconditional access. In February 1718, Prince George William died aged only three months, with his father by his side.

=== Political opposition ===
Banned from the palace and shunned by his own father, the Prince of Wales was identified for the next several years with opposition to George I's policies, which included measures designed to increase religious freedom in Great Britain and expand Hanover's German territories at the expense of Sweden. His new London residence, Leicester House, became a frequent meeting place for his father's political opponents, including Sir Robert Walpole and Lord Townshend, who had left the government in 1717.

The King visited Hanover again from May to November 1719. Instead of appointing George to the guardianship, he established a regency council. In 1720, Walpole encouraged the King and his son to reconcile, for the sake of public unity, which they did half-heartedly. Walpole and Townshend returned to political office, and rejoined the ministry. George was soon disillusioned with the terms of the reconciliation; his three daughters who were in the care of the King were not returned and he was still barred from becoming regent during the King's absences. He came to believe that Walpole had tricked him into the rapprochement as part of a scheme to regain power. Over the next few years, he and Caroline lived quietly, avoiding overt political activity. They had three more children: William, Mary, and Louisa, who were brought up at Leicester House and Richmond Lodge, George's summer residence.

In 1721, the economic disaster of the South Sea Bubble allowed Walpole to rise to the pinnacle of government. Walpole and his Whig Party were dominant in politics, as the King feared that the Tories would not support the succession laid down in the Act of Settlement. The power of the Whigs was so great that the Tories would not hold power for another half-century.

== Reign ==
=== Accession ===
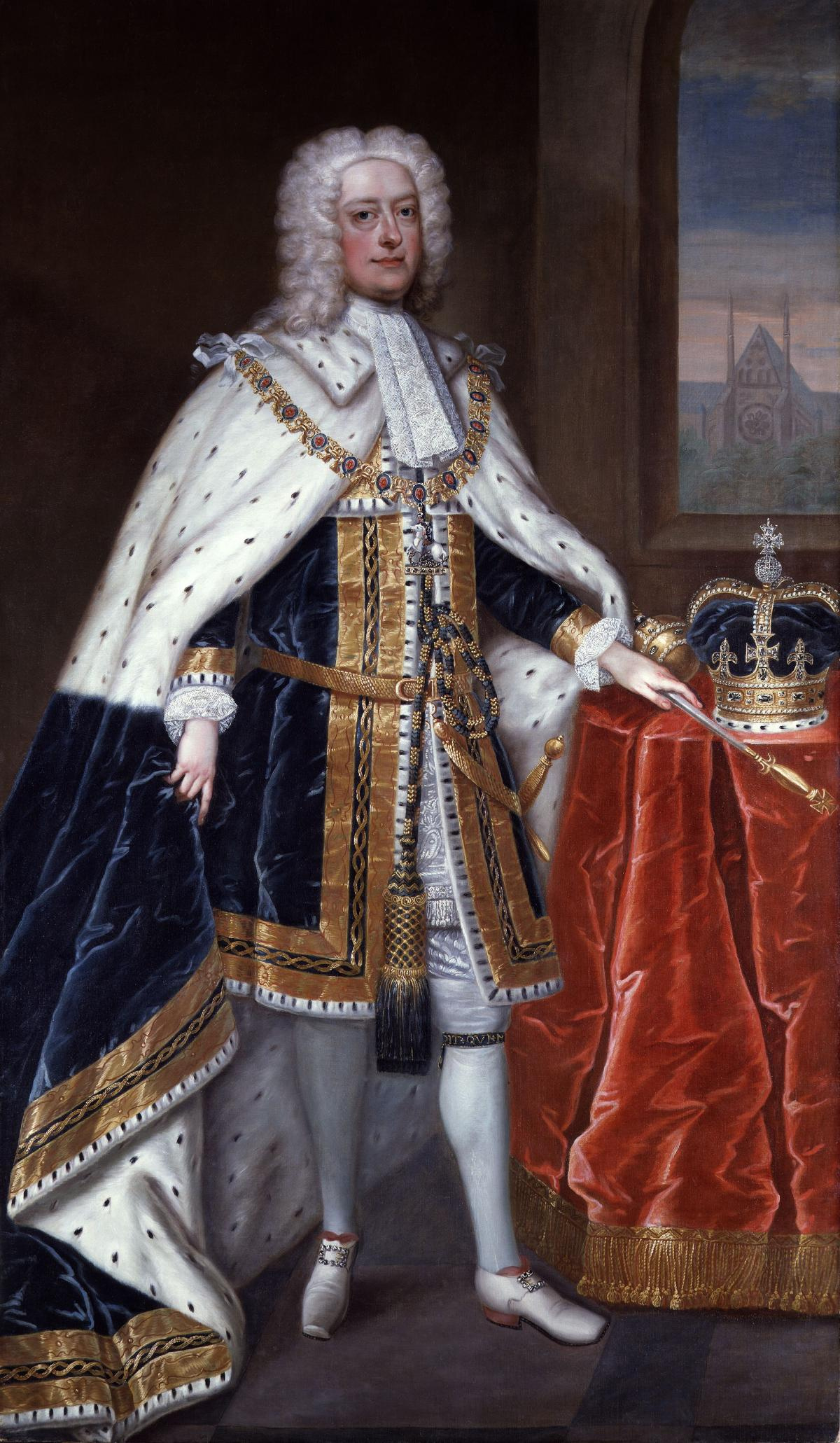
Portrait by Charles Jervas, c. 1727

George I died on 11/22 June 1727 during one of his visits to Hanover, and his son succeeded him as king and elector at the age of 43. George II decided not to travel to Germany for his father's funeral, which far from bringing criticism led to praise from the English who considered it proof of his fondness for England. He suppressed his father's will because it attempted to split the Hanoverian succession between George II's future grandsons rather than vest all the domains (both British and Hanoverian) in a single person. Both British and Hanoverian ministers considered the will unlawful, as George I did not have the legal power to determine the succession personally. Critics supposed that George II hid the will to avoid paying out his father's legacies.

George II was crowned at Westminster Abbey on 11/22 October 1727. George Frideric Handel was commissioned to write four new anthems for the coronation, including Zadok the Priest.

It was widely believed that George would dismiss Walpole, who had distressed him by joining his father's government, and replace him with Sir Spencer Compton. George asked Compton, rather than Walpole, to write his first speech as king, but Compton asked Walpole to draft it. Caroline advised George to retain Walpole, who continued to gain royal favour by securing a generous civil list (a fixed annual amount set by Parliament for the king's official expenditure) of £800,000, equivalent to £148,300,000 today. Walpole commanded a substantial majority in Parliament and George had little choice but to retain him or risk ministerial instability. Compton was ennobled as Lord Wilmington the following year.

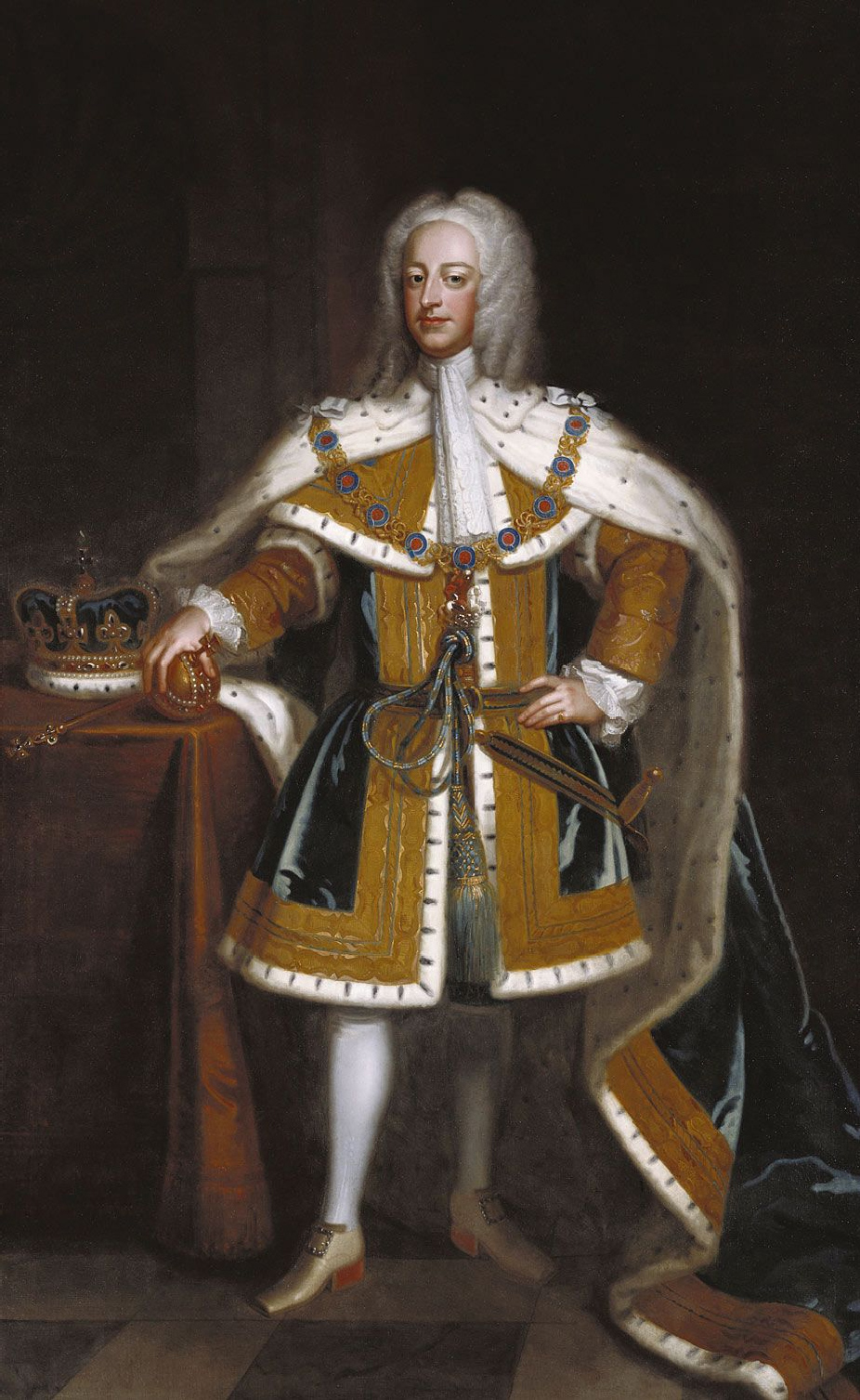
Portrait by Enoch Seeman, c. 1730

Walpole directed domestic policy, and after the resignation of Lord Townshend in 1730 also controlled George's foreign policy. Historians generally believe that George played an honorific role in Britain, and closely followed the advice of Walpole and senior ministers, who made the major decisions. Although the King was eager for war in Europe, his ministers were more cautious. A truce was agreed in the Anglo-Spanish War, and George unsuccessfully pressed Walpole to join the War of the Polish Succession on the side of the German states. In April 1733 Walpole withdrew the unpopular Excise Bill that had attracted strong opposition, including from within his own party. George lent Walpole support by dismissing the bill's opponents from their court offices.

=== Family problems ===
George II's relationship with his son Frederick, Prince of Wales, worsened during the 1730s. Frederick had been left behind in Germany when his parents came to England, and they had not met for 14 years. In 1728, he was brought to England, and swiftly became a figurehead of the political opposition. When George visited Hanover in the summers of 1729, 1732 and 1735, he left his wife to chair the regency council in Britain rather than his son. Meanwhile, rivalry between George II and his brother-in-law and first cousin Frederick William I of Prussia led to tension along the Prussian–Hanoverian border, which eventually culminated in the mobilization of troops in the border zone and suggestions of a duel between the two kings. Negotiations for a marriage between the Prince of Wales and Frederick William's daughter Wilhelmine dragged on for years but neither side would make the concessions demanded by the other, and the idea was shelved. Instead, the Prince married Princess Augusta of Saxe-Gotha in April 1736.

In May 1736, George returned to Hanover, which resulted in unpopularity in England; a satirical notice was even pinned to the gates of St James's Palace decrying his absence. "Lost or strayed out of this house", it read, "a man who has left a wife and six children on the parish." The King made plans to return in the face of inclement December weather; when his ship was caught in a storm, gossip swept London that he had drowned. Eventually, in January 1737, he arrived back in England. Immediately, he fell ill with a fever and piles, and withdrew to his bed. The Prince of Wales put it about that the King was dying, with the result that George insisted on getting up and attending a social event to disprove the gossip-mongers.

When the Prince of Wales applied to Parliament for an increase in his allowance, an open quarrel broke out. The King, who had a reputation for stinginess, offered a private settlement, which Frederick rejected. Parliament voted against the measure, but George reluctantly increased his son's allowance on Walpole's advice. Further friction between them followed when Frederick excluded the King and Queen from the birth of his daughter in July 1737 by bundling his wife, who was in labour, into a coach and driving off in the middle of the night. George banished him and his family from the royal court, much as his own father had done to him, except that he allowed Frederick to retain custody of his children.

Soon afterwards, George's wife Caroline died on 20 November 1737 (O.S.). He was deeply affected by her death, and to the surprise of many displayed "a tenderness of which the world thought him before utterly incapable". On her deathbed she told her sobbing husband to remarry, to which he replied, "Non, j'aurai des maîtresses!" (French for "No, I shall have mistresses!"). It was common knowledge that George had already had mistresses during his marriage, and he had kept Caroline informed about them. Henrietta Howard, later Countess of Suffolk, had moved to Hanover with her husband during the reign of Queen Anne, and had been one of Caroline's women of the bedchamber. She was his mistress from before the accession of George I until November 1734. She was followed by Amalie von Wallmoden, later Countess of Yarmouth, whose son, Johann Ludwig von Wallmoden, may have been fathered by George. Johann Ludwig was born while Amalie was still married to her husband, and George did not acknowledge him publicly as his own son.

=== War and rebellion ===
Against Walpole's wishes, but to George's delight, Britain reopened hostilities with Spain in 1739. Britain's conflict with Spain, the War of Jenkins' Ear, became part of the War of the Austrian Succession when a major European dispute broke out upon the death of Holy Roman Emperor Charles VI in 1740. At issue was the right of Charles's daughter, Maria Theresa, to succeed to his Austrian dominions. George spent the summers of 1740 and 1741 in Hanover, where he was more able to intervene directly in European diplomatic affairs in his capacity as elector.

Prince Frederick campaigned actively for the opposition in the 1741 British general election, and Walpole was unable to secure a stable majority. Walpole attempted to buy off the Prince with the promise of an increased allowance and offered to pay off his debts, but Frederick refused. With his support eroded, Walpole retired in 1742 after over 20 years in office. He was replaced by Spencer Compton, Lord Wilmington, whom George had originally considered for the premiership in 1727. Wilmington, however, was a figurehead; actual power was held by others, such as Lord Carteret, George's favourite minister after Walpole. When Wilmington died in 1743, Henry Pelham took his place at the head of the government.

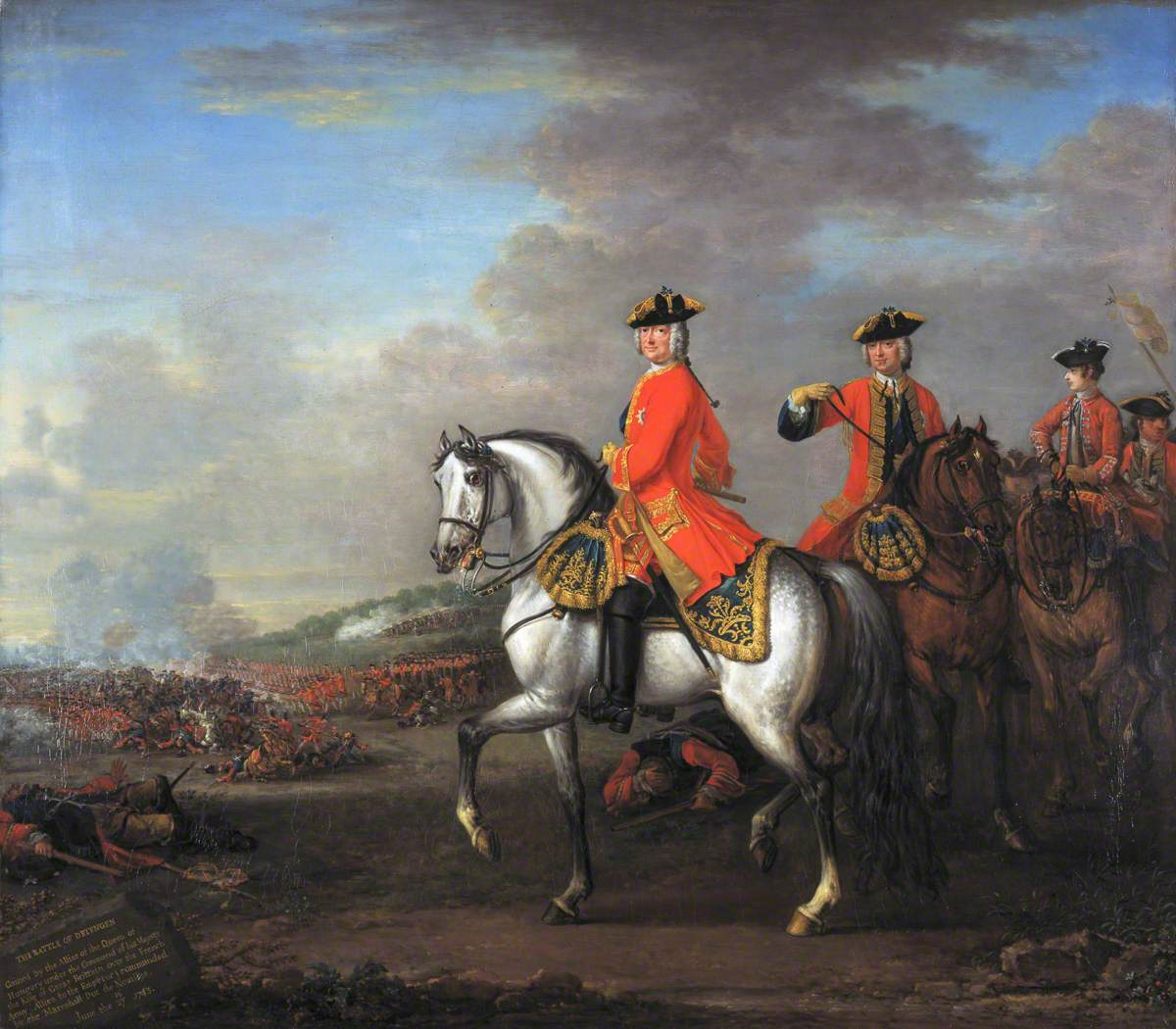
Depicted at the Battle of Dettingen in 1743 by John Wootton

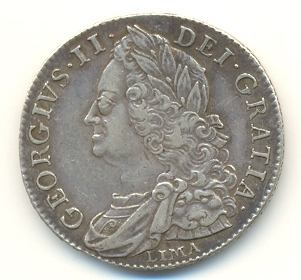
Half-crown of George II, 1746. The inscription reads GEORGIUS II DEI GRATIA (George II by the Grace of God). The word LIMA under the King's head signifies that the coin was struck from silver seized from the Spanish treasure fleet off Lima, Peru, during the War of the Austrian Succession.

The pro-war faction was led by Carteret, who claimed that French power would increase if Maria Theresa failed to succeed to the Austrian throne. George agreed to send 12,000 hired Hessian and Danish mercenaries to Europe, ostensibly to support Maria Theresa. Without conferring with his British ministers, George stationed them in Hanover to prevent enemy French troops from marching into the electorate. The British Army had not fought in a major European war in over 20 years, and the government had badly neglected its upkeep. George had pushed for greater professionalism in the ranks, and promotion by merit rather than by sale of commissions, but without much success. An allied force of Austrian, British, Dutch, Hanoverian and Hessian troops engaged the French at the Battle of Dettingen on 16/27 June 1743. George personally accompanied them, leading them to victory, thus becoming the last British monarch to lead troops into battle. Though his actions in the battle were admired, the war soon became unpopular with the British public, who felt that the King and Carteret were subordinating British interests to Hanoverian ones. Carteret lost support, and to George's dismay resigned in 1744.

Tension grew between the Pelham ministry and George, as he continued to take advice from Carteret and rejected pressure from his other ministers to include William Pitt the Elder in the Cabinet, which would have broadened the government's support base. The King disliked Pitt because he had previously opposed government policy and attacked measures seen as pro-Hanoverian. In February 1746, Pelham and his followers resigned. George asked Lord Bath and Carteret to form an administration, but after less than 48 hours they returned the seals of office, unable to secure sufficient parliamentary support. Pelham returned to office triumphant, and George was forced to appoint Pitt to the ministry.

George's French opponents encouraged rebellion by the Jacobites, the supporters of the Roman Catholic claimant to the British throne, James Francis Edward Stuart, often known as the Old Pretender. Stuart was the son of James II, who had been deposed in 1688 and replaced by his Protestant relations. Two prior rebellions in 1715 and 1719 had failed. In July 1745, the Old Pretender's son, Charles Edward Stuart, popularly known as Bonnie Prince Charlie or the Young Pretender, landed in Scotland, where support for his cause was highest. George, who was summering in Hanover, returned to London at the end of August. The Jacobites defeated British forces in September at the Battle of Prestonpans, and then moved south into England. The Jacobites failed to gain further support, and the French reneged on a promise of help. Losing morale, the Jacobites retreated back into Scotland. On 16/27 April 1746, Charles faced George's military-minded son Prince William, Duke of Cumberland, in the Battle of Culloden, the last pitched battle fought on British soil. The ravaged Jacobite troops were routed by the government army. Charles escaped to France, but many of his supporters were caught and executed. Jacobitism was all but crushed; no further serious attempt was made at restoring the House of Stuart. The War of the Austrian Succession continued until 1748, when Maria Theresa was recognized as Archduchess of Austria and Queen of Bohemia. The peace was celebrated by a fête in Green Park, London, for which Handel composed Music for the Royal Fireworks.

=== Planning for succession ===
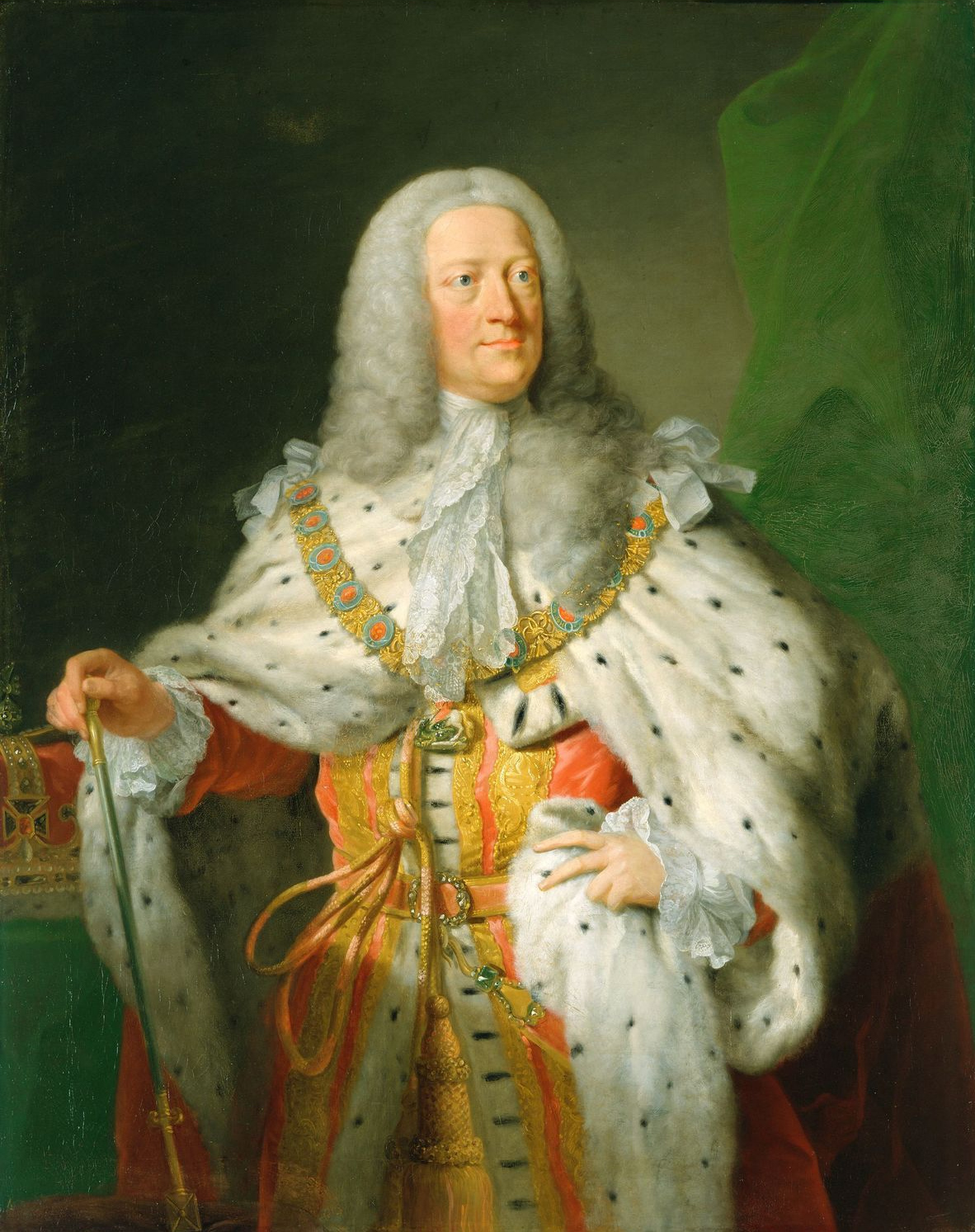
Portrait by John Shackleton, c. 1755–1757

In the general election of 1747, Frederick, Prince of Wales, again campaigned actively for the opposition but Pelham's party won easily. Like his father before him, Frederick entertained opposition figures at his house in Leicester Square. When Frederick died unexpectedly in 1751, his eldest son, Prince George, became heir apparent. The King commiserated with Frederick's widow, Augusta, and wept with her. As her son would not reach the age of majority until 1756, a new British Regency Act was passed that would make her regent, assisted by a council led by Frederick's brother William in case of George II's death. The King also made a new will, which provided for William to be sole regent in Hanover. After the death of his daughter Louisa at the end of the year, George lamented, "This has been a fatal year for my family. I lost my eldest son – but I am glad of it ... Now [Louisa] is gone. I know I did not love my children when they were young: I hated to have them running into my room; but now I love them as well as most fathers."

=== Seven Years' War ===
In 1754 Pelham died, to be succeeded by his elder brother, Thomas Pelham-Holles, 1st Duke of Newcastle. Hostility between France and Britain, particularly over the colonization of North America, continued. Tensions escalated into a full colonial war in North America between Britain and France in May 1754. Fearing a French invasion of Hanover, George aligned himself with Prussia (now ruled by his nephew, Frederick the Great), Austria's enemy. Russia and France allied with Austria, their former enemy. A French invasion of the British-held island of Minorca led to the outbreak of the Seven Years' War in 1756. Public disquiet over British failures at the start of the conflict led to Newcastle's resignation and the appointment of William Cavendish, 4th Duke of Devonshire, as prime minister and William Pitt the Elder as Secretary of State for the Southern Department. In April the following year George dismissed Pitt in an attempt to construct an administration more to his liking. Over the succeeding three months attempts to form another stable ministerial combination failed. In June Lord Waldegrave held the seals of office for only four days. By the start of July, Pitt was recalled and Newcastle returned as prime minister. As Secretary of State, Pitt guided policy relating to the war. Great Britain, Hanover, and Prussia and their allies Hesse-Kassel and Brunswick-Wolfenbüttel fought against other European powers, including France, Austria, Russia, Sweden and Saxony. The war involved multiple theatres from Europe to North America and India, where British dominance increased with the victories of Robert Clive over French forces and their allies at the Battle of Arcot and the Battle of Plassey.

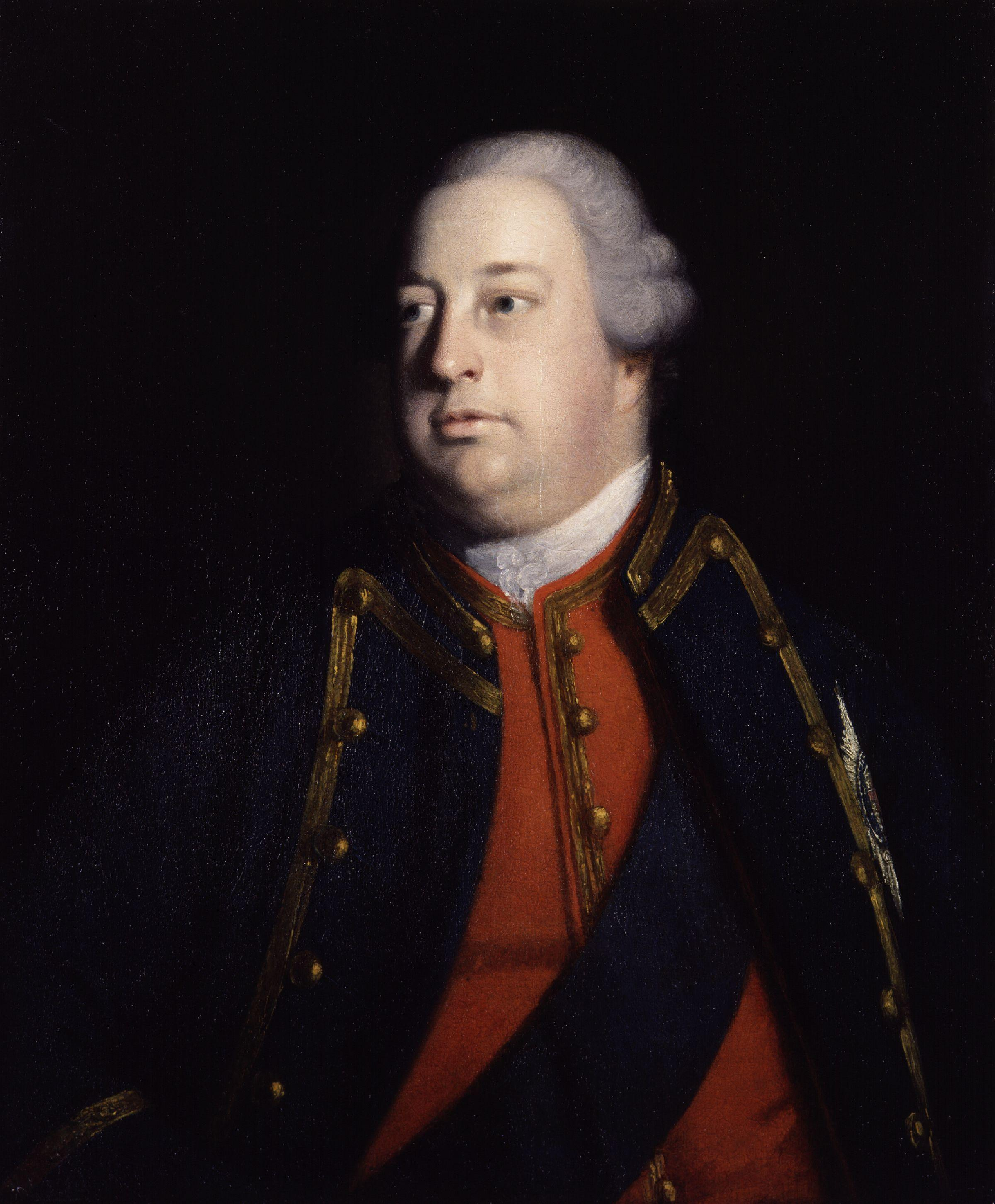
George said his son Prince William, Duke of Cumberland (pictured), had "ruined me and disgraced himself" at the 1757 Convention of Klosterzeven.

George's son William commanded the King's troops in northern Germany. In 1757 Hanover was invaded and George gave his son full powers to conclude a separate peace, but by September George was furious at William's negotiated settlement, which he felt greatly favoured the French. George said his son had "ruined me and disgraced himself". William, by his own choice, resigned his military offices, and George revoked the peace deal on the grounds that the French had infringed it by disarming Hessian troops after the ceasefire.

In the Annus Mirabilis of 1759 British forces captured Quebec and captured Guadeloupe, defeated a French plan to invade Britain following naval battles at Lagos and Quiberon Bay, and halted a resumed French advance on Hanover at the Battle of Minden.

=== Death ===
By October 1760 George II was blind in one eye and hard of hearing. On the morning of 25 October he rose as usual at 6:00 am, drank a cup of hot chocolate, and went to his close stool alone. After a few minutes, his valet heard a loud crash and entered the room to find the King on the floor; his physician, Frank Nicholls, recorded that he "appeared to have just come from his necessary-stool, and as if going to open his escritoire".

The King was lifted into his bed, and Princess Amelia was sent for; before she reached him, he was dead. At the age of nearly 77 he had lived longer than any of his English or British predecessors. A post-mortem revealed that George had died as the result of a thoracic aortic dissection. He was succeeded by his grandson George III, and buried on 11 November in Westminster Abbey. He left instructions for the sides of his and his wife's coffins to be removed so that their remains could mingle.

== Legacy ==
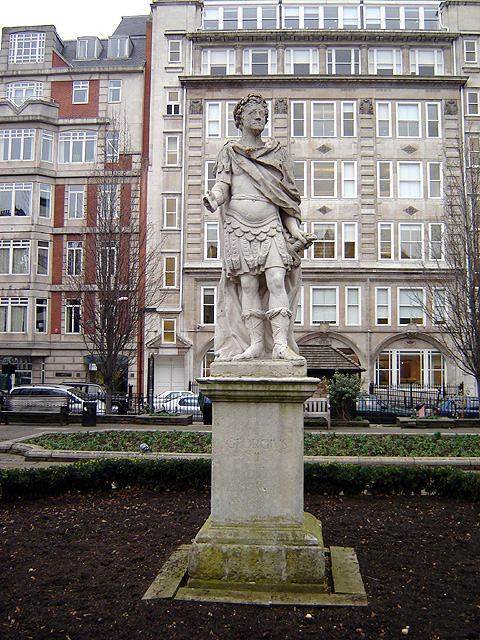
Statue of George II by John Van Nost erected in 1753 in Golden Square, London

George donated the royal library to the British Museum in 1757, four years after the museum's foundation. He had no interest in reading, or in the arts and sciences, and preferred to spend his leisure hours stag-hunting on horseback or playing cards. In 1737, he founded the Georg August University of Göttingen, the first university in the Electorate of Hanover, and visited it in 1748. The asteroid 359 Georgia was named in his honour at the university in 1902. He served as the Chancellor of the University of Dublin between 1716 and 1727; and in 1754 issued the charter for King's College in New York City, which later became Columbia University. The province of Georgia, founded by royal charter in 1732 and later a U.S. state, was named after him.

During George II's reign British interests expanded throughout the world, the Jacobite challenge to the Hanoverian dynasty was extinguished, and the power of ministers and Parliament in Britain became well-established. Nevertheless, in the memoirs of contemporaries such as Lord Hervey and Horace Walpole, George is depicted as a weak buffoon, governed by his wife and ministers. Biographies of George written during the nineteenth and first part of the twentieth century relied on these biased accounts. Since the last quarter of the twentieth century, scholarly analysis of surviving correspondence has indicated that George was not as ineffective as previously thought. Letters from ministers are annotated by George with pertinent remarks and demonstrate that he had a grasp of and interest in foreign policy in particular. He was often able to prevent the appointment of ministers or commanders he disliked, or sideline them into lesser offices. This academic reassessment, however, has not completely eliminated the popular perception of George II as a "faintly ludicrous king". His parsimony, for example, may have opened him to ridicule, though his biographers observe that parsimony is preferable to extravagance. Lord Charlemont excused George's short temper by explaining that sincerity of feeling is better than deception, "His temper was warm and impetuous, but he was good-natured and sincere. Unskilled in the royal talent of dissimulation, he always was what he appeared to be. He might offend, but he never deceived." Lord Waldegrave wrote, "I am thoroughly convinced that hereafter, when time shall have wore away those specks and blemishes which sully the brightest characters, and from which no man is totally exempt, he will be numbered amongst those patriot kings, under whose government the people have enjoyed the greatest happiness". George may not have played a major role in history, but he was influential at times and he upheld constitutional government. Elizabeth Montagu said of him, "With him our laws and liberties were safe, he possessed in a great degree the confidence of his people and the respect of foreign governments; and a certain steadiness of character made him of great consequence in these unsettled times ... His character would not afford subject for epic poetry, but will look well in the sober page of history."

== Titles, styles and arms ==
In Britain, George's titles were:

- From 1706: Duke and Marquess of Cambridge, Earl of Milford Haven, Viscount Northallerton and Baron of Tewkesbury
- August–September 1714: His Royal Highness George Augustus, Prince of Great Britain, Electoral Prince of Brunswick-Lüneburg, Duke of Cornwall and Rothesay, etc.
- 1714–1727: His Royal Highness The Prince of Wales
- 1727–1760: His Majesty The King

George II's full style was "George the Second, by the Grace of God, King of Great Britain, France and Ireland, Defender of the Faith, Duke of Brunswick-Lüneburg, Archtreasurer and Prince-Elector of the Holy Roman Empire".

When George became Prince of Wales in 1714, he was granted the royal arms with an inescutcheon of gules plain in the Hanoverian quarter differenced overall by a label of three points argent. The crest included the single arched coronet of his rank. As king, he used the royal arms as used by his father undifferenced.

Coats of arms of George II of Great Britain

Coat of arms as the Prince of Wales 1714–1727

Coat of arms of George II as King of Great Britain (outside Scotland) 1727–1760

Coat of arms of George II as King of Great Britain in Scotland

== Family ==
=== Ancestry ===
Ancestors of George II of Great Britain

8. George, Duke of Brunswick-Lüneburg (=12)
4. Ernest Augustus, Elector of Brunswick-Lüneburg
9. Anne Eleonore of Hesse-Darmstadt (=13)
2. George I of Great Britain
10. Frederick V, Elector Palatine
5. Sophia, Princess Palatine of the Rhine
11. Elizabeth Stuart
1. George II of Great Britain
12. George, Duke of Brunswick-Lüneburg (=8)
6. George William, Duke of Brunswick-Lüneburg
13. Anne Eleonore of Hesse-Darmstadt (=9)
3. Sophia Dorothea of Celle
14. Alexandre II Desmier, Seigneur d'Olbreuse
7. Éléonore Desmier d'Olbreuse, Countess of Wilhelmsburg
15. Jacquette Poussard de Vandré

Family tree of Dukes and Marquesses of Cambridge

King James VI and I (1566–1625)
Elizabeth Stuart (1596–1662); Queen of Bohemia	King Charles I (1600–1649)
Duke of Gloucester (4th creation) and Earl of Cambridge (5th creation), 1659
Sophia of Hanover (1630–1714)	King Charles II (1630–1685)	King James VII and II (1633–1701)	Henry Stuart (1640–1660); Duke of Gloucester, etc.
Dukedom of Gloucester (4th creation) and Earl of Cambridge (5th creation) extinct, 1660
Duke of Cambridge (1st creation), Earl of Cambridge (6th creation), and Baron of Dauntsey (1st creation), 1664	Duke of Cambridge (2nd creation), Earl of Cambridge (7th creation), and Baron of Dauntsey (2nd creation), 1667
King George I (1660–1727)	Charles Stuart (1660–1661) styled Duke of Cambridge	James Stuart (1663–1667); Duke of Cambridge, etc.	Edgar Stuart (1667–1671); Duke of Cambridge, etc.	Charles Stuart (1677) styled Duke of Cambridge
Dukedom of Cambridge (1st creation), Earldom of Cambridge (6th creation), and Barony of Dauntsey (1st creation) extinct, 1667	Dukedom of Cambridge (2nd creation), Earldom of Cambridge (7th creation), and Barony of Dauntsey (2nd creation) extinct, 1671
Duke of Cambridge (3rd creation) and Marquess of Cambridge (1st creation), 1706
Prince George (1683–1760); Duke of Cambridge, etc. later King George II
Dukedom of Cambridge (3rd creation) and Marquessate of Cambridge (1st creation) merged with the Crown, 1727
Prince Frederick (1707–1751); Prince of Wales
George III (1738–1820)
Duke of Cambridge (4th creation), Earl of Tipperary and Baron Culloden (1st creation), 1801
Prince Edward (1767–1820); Duke of Kent and Strathearn	Prince Adolphus (1774–1850); 1st Duke of Cambridge, etc.
Queen Victoria (1819–1901)	Prince George (1819–1904); 2nd Duke of Cambridge, etc.	Princess Mary Adelaide of Cambridge (1833–1897)
Dukedom of Cambridge (4th creation), Earldom of Tipperary, and Barony Culloden (1st creation extinct, 1904
King Edward VII (1841–1910)
Marquess of Cambridge (2nd creation), Earl of Eltham (1st creation), and Viscount Northallerton, 1917
King George V (1865–1936)	Mary of Teck (1867–1953)	Adolphus Cambridge (1868–1927); Duke of Teck, 1st Marquess of Cambridge, etc.
King Edward VIII (1894–1972)	King George VI (1895–1952)	George Francis Hugh Cambridge (1895–1981); 2nd Marquess of Cambridge, etc.
Marquessate of Cambridge (2nd creation), Earldom of Eltham (2nd creation), Viscountcy Northallerton extinct, 1981
Queen Elizabeth II (1926–2022)
King Charles III (b. 1948)
Duke of Cambridge (5th creation), Earl of Strathearn (Mountbatten-Windsor line), and Baron Carrickfergus, 2011
Prince William (b. 1982); Prince of Wales, Duke of Cornwall, Duke of Rothesay, Duke of Cambridge, etc., Earl of Chester
Prince George of Wales (b. 2013)
Heir apparent to the Dukedom of Cambridge

=== Issue ===
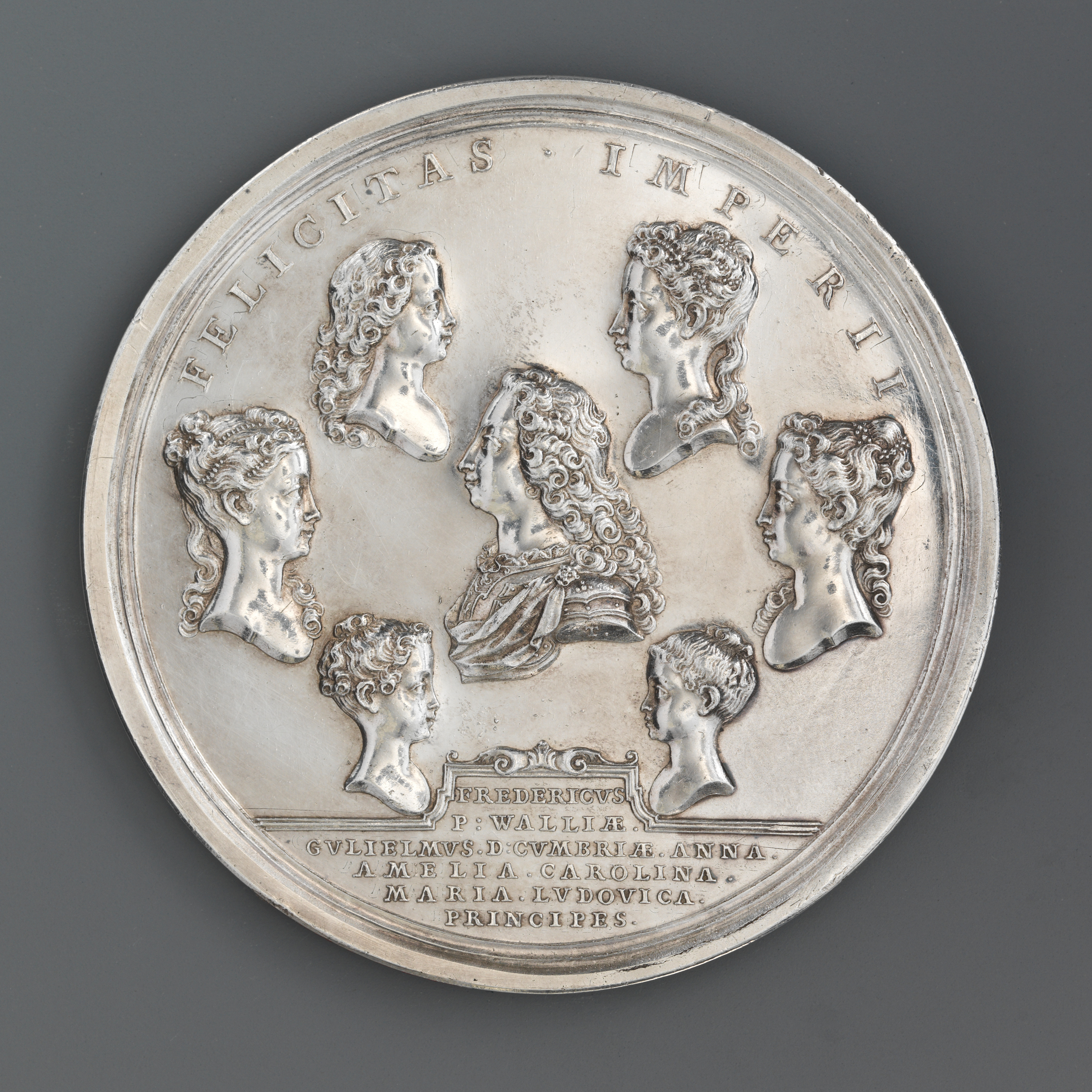
John Croker's medal of 1732 showing the surviving children of George II and Caroline: Frederick, William, Anne, Amelia, Caroline, Mary, and Louisa

Caroline's ten or eleven pregnancies resulted in eight live births. One of the couple's children died in infancy, and seven lived to adulthood. Only three outlived their father (Amelia, William and Mary).

Name	Birth	Death	Notes
Frederick, Prince of Wales	31 January 1707	31 March 1751	Married 1736, Princess Augusta of Saxe-Gotha; had issue, including the future George III
Anne, Princess Royal	2 November 1709	12 January 1759	Married 1734, William IV, Prince of Orange; had issue
Princess Amelia	10 June 1711	31 October 1786	Never married, no issue
Princess Caroline	10 June 1713	28 December 1757	Never married, no issue
Stillborn son	20 November 1716		
Prince George William	13 November 1717	17 February 1718	Died in infancy
Prince William, Duke of Cumberland	26 April 1721	31 October 1765	Never married, no issue
Princess Mary	5 March 1723	14 January 1772	Married 1740, Frederick II, Landgrave of Hesse-Kassel; had issue
Princess Louisa	18 December 1724	19 December 1751	Married 1743, Frederick V, King of Denmark and Norway; had issue
Dates in this table are New Style

== Notes ==
George II of Great Britain House of Hanover Cadet branch of the House of Welf Born: 9 November 1683 Died: 25 October 1760
Regnal titles
Preceded by George I	King of Great Britain and Ireland, Elector of Hanover; 11/22 June 1727 – 25 October 1760	Succeeded by George III
British royalty
Vacant Title last held by James	Prince of Wales; Duke of Cornwall; Duke of Rothesay; 1714–1727	Succeeded by Frederick
Academic offices
Preceded by The Duke of Ormonde	Chancellor of the University of Dublin; 1715–1727	Succeeded by HRH Frederick, Prince of Wales
