= Marquess of Cambridge =

Title in the peerages of England and the United Kingdom

Marquessate of Cambridge
- Blazon Arms: Quarterly: 1st and 4th grand-quarters, quarterly, I & IV, Gules, three Lions passant guardant, armed and langued Azure (England); II, Or, a Lion rampant Gules, armed and langued Azure, within a Double-Tressure flory counter-flory Gules (Scotland); III, Azure, a Harp Or, stringed Argent (Ireland); over all an Inescutcheon tiercé reversed i, Gules, two Lions passant guardant Or, armed and langued Azure; ii, Or, semée of Hearts Gules, a Lion rampant Azure; iii, Gules, a Horse courant Argent; the whole differenced by a Label of three-points Argent, the centre charged with a Cross Gules, and the outer with two Hearts Gules: 2nd and 3rd grand-quarters, Or, three Stag’s Attires fesswise in pale, the points of each attire to the sinister Sable (Württemberg), Impaling Or, three Lions passant in pale Sable, langued Gules, the sinister Forepaws Gules (Swabia), over all an Inescutcheon lozengy bendy sinister Sable and Or (Teck). Crest: A Dog’s Head and Neck lozengy bendy sinister Sable and Or, langued Gules. Supporters: Dexter: A Lion Sable, the dexter forepaw Gules. Sinister: A Stag proper.
- Creation date: 16 July 1917
- Creation: Second
- Created by: King George V
- Peerage: Peerage of the United Kingdom
- First holder: Adolphus Cambridge, 1st Marquess of Cambridge
- Last holder: George Cambridge, 2nd Marquess of Cambridge
- Remainder to: The 1st Marquess’s heirs male of the body lawfully begotten
- Subsidiary titles: Earl of Eltham; Viscount Northallerton
- Status: Extinct
- Extinction date: 16 April 1981
- Motto: FIDES ET FIDELIS (Fearless and faithful)

Marquess of Cambridge was a title that was created twice, once in the Peerage of England and once in the Peerage of the United Kingdom.

The first creation was for Prince George Augustus in 1706, when he was created Duke of Cambridge, Marquess of Cambridge, Earl of Milford Haven, Viscount Northallerton and Baron of Tewkesbury. He succeeded to the Dukedoms of Cornwall and Rothesay on his father's accession to the throne on 1 August 1714. His titles merged with the Crown when he succeeded to the throne as King George II in 1727.

The second creation (along with the subsidiary titles Earl of Eltham and Viscount Northallerton) was in 1917 for Adolphus, Duke of Teck, brother of Queen Mary and brother-in-law of King George V, when he gave up his German titles and took the surname "Cambridge". Adolphus Cambridge was a grandson of Prince Adolphus, Duke of Cambridge through his daughter Princess Mary Adelaide of Cambridge.

Upon the death of the second Marquess without any male heirs, the marquessate became extinct.

== Marquess of Cambridge (1706-1727) ==
- Prince George Augustus, Duke of Cambridge (1683-1760), Succeeded to the throne in 1727 as King George II

For further details see Duke of Cambridge

== Marquesses of Cambridge (1917–1981) ==
- Adolphus Charles Alexander Albert Edward George Philip Louis Ladislaus Cambridge, 1st Marquess of Cambridge (1868–1927), grandson of Prince Adolphus, Duke of Cambridge, was created Marquess when George V relinquished his family's German titles
- George Francis Hugh Cambridge, 2nd Marquess of Cambridge (1895–1981), only son of the 1st Marquess, died without male issue and his honours became extinct

== Family tree ==
Family tree of Dukes and Marquesses of Cambridge

King James VI and I (1566–1625)
Elizabeth Stuart (1596–1662); Queen of Bohemia	King Charles I (1600–1649)
Duke of Gloucester (4th creation) and Earl of Cambridge (5th creation), 1659
Sophia of Hanover (1630–1714)	King Charles II (1630–1685)	King James VII and II (1633–1701)	Henry Stuart (1640–1660); Duke of Gloucester, etc.
Dukedom of Gloucester (4th creation) and Earl of Cambridge (5th creation) extinct, 1660
Duke of Cambridge (1st creation), Earl of Cambridge (6th creation), and Baron of Dauntsey (1st creation), 1664	Duke of Cambridge (2nd creation), Earl of Cambridge (7th creation), and Baron of Dauntsey (2nd creation), 1667
King George I (1660–1727)	Charles Stuart (1660–1661) styled Duke of Cambridge	James Stuart (1663–1667); Duke of Cambridge, etc.	Edgar Stuart (1667–1671); Duke of Cambridge, etc.	Charles Stuart (1677) styled Duke of Cambridge
Dukedom of Cambridge (1st creation), Earldom of Cambridge (6th creation), and Barony of Dauntsey (1st creation) extinct, 1667	Dukedom of Cambridge (2nd creation), Earldom of Cambridge (7th creation), and Barony of Dauntsey (2nd creation) extinct, 1671
Duke of Cambridge (3rd creation) and Marquess of Cambridge (1st creation), 1706
Prince George (1683–1760); Duke of Cambridge, etc. later King George II
Dukedom of Cambridge (3rd creation) and Marquessate of Cambridge (1st creation) merged with the Crown, 1727
Prince Frederick (1707–1751); Prince of Wales
George III (1738–1820)
Duke of Cambridge (4th creation), Earl of Tipperary and Baron Culloden (1st creation), 1801
Prince Edward (1767–1820); Duke of Kent and Strathearn	Prince Adolphus (1774–1850); 1st Duke of Cambridge, etc.
Queen Victoria (1819–1901)	Prince George (1819–1904); 2nd Duke of Cambridge, etc.	Princess Mary Adelaide of Cambridge (1833–1897)
Dukedom of Cambridge (4th creation), Earldom of Tipperary, and Barony Culloden (1st creation extinct, 1904
King Edward VII (1841–1910)
Marquess of Cambridge (2nd creation), Earl of Eltham (1st creation), and Viscount Northallerton, 1917
King George V (1865–1936)	Mary of Teck (1867–1953)	Adolphus Cambridge (1868–1927); Duke of Teck, 1st Marquess of Cambridge, etc.
King Edward VIII (1894–1972)	King George VI (1895–1952)	George Francis Hugh Cambridge (1895–1981); 2nd Marquess of Cambridge, etc.
Marquessate of Cambridge (2nd creation), Earldom of Eltham (2nd creation), Viscountcy Northallerton extinct, 1981
Queen Elizabeth II (1926–2022)
King Charles III (b. 1948)
Duke of Cambridge (5th creation), Earl of Strathearn (Mountbatten-Windsor line), and Baron Carrickfergus, 2011
Prince William (b. 1982); Prince of Wales, Duke of Cornwall, Duke of Rothesay, Duke of Cambridge, etc., Earl of Chester
Prince George of Wales (b. 2013)
Heir apparent to the Dukedom of Cambridge
