= Charles Stuart, Duke of Cambridge =

Charles Stuart, Duke of Cambridge may refer to either of two sons of James, Duke of York (later James II of England & VII of Scotland):

- Charles Stuart, Duke of Cambridge (1660–1661), son of James, Duke of York and Anne Hyde
- Charles Stuart, Duke of Cambridge (1677), son of James, Duke of York and Mary of Modena

== See also ==
- Charles Stuart, Duke of Kendal
