= Coat of arms of Württemberg =

Coat of arms of the Kingdom of Württemberg

Versions
- More elaborate arms were used until 1817
- Adopted: 1817
- Crest: King's helm and crown
- Shield: Per pale: on the dexter, the shield of Württemberg, on the sinister, the shield of Swabia
- Supporters: On the dexter, a black lion crowned; on the sinister, a gold deer
- Motto: Furchtlos und treu ("Fearless and loyal")
- Other elements: Surrounded by laurel and palm branches

The coat of arms of the Kingdom of Württemberg shows an impalement of the three black antlers that represent Württemberg on the dexter (viewer's left) side, and the three black lions passant of medieval Swabia on the sinister (viewer's right) side, both on a gold field.

== History ==
The coat of arms was formally adopted by King William I of Württemberg on 30 December 1817, lasting between 1817 and 1922, and occasionally seen on state flags of this period.

This version derived from the escutcheon found in the centre of the much larger and more elaborate coat of arms that was used when the Electorate of Württemberg was elevated to the status of a kingdom in 1806. Württemberg had recently acquired several territories under the mediatisation system and incorporated their heraldries into its arms, resulting in a complicated design. This caused the need to choose something much simpler, and the 1817 arms had the two essential elements – three lions for the whole region of Swabia, and three antlers for its largest ruling dynasty.

By 26 December 1816, the kingdom had also settled on the colours red and black for its flag; gold and black being too similar to the ruling Habsburg dynasty of the Austrian Empire, and red and gold being the colours of Würzburg, their allies in the Napoleonic Wars.

From 1949 the insignia has formed part of the present-day coat of arms of Baden-Württemberg.

== Ducal arms (1495−1803) ==
The antler motif had been used for centuries previously by the Counts of Württemberg. From 1495, the Duchy of Württemberg's coat of arms included the four quarters shown below. Their symbolism is:

=== Quarters ===
- First: on a field of gold, three black stag's antlers of four branches - the County/Duchy of Württemberg, whose seat was in the original Württemberg castle on a hilltop near Stuttgart. It is based on the arms of their cousins, the Counts of Nellenburg (three blue antlers on a field of gold), which was in turn based on the arms of their cousins, the Counts of Veringen (three red antlers on a field of gold).
- Second: lozengy (a geometric field of lozenges - or wide diamond shapes) in bend (shown angled from the top right to lower left) of black and gold – the County of Teck, acquired in 1381. The later morganatic Dukes of Teck (1871−1918) differenced the arms as lozengy in bend sinister (shown angled from the top left to lower right).
- Third: on a blue field, a standard flying (a flag shown waving in the breeze) a black eagle on a field of gold – "Reichssturmfahne" given to the Swabian nobility for their merit in battle and proclaiming the right of first contact with the enemy, when campaigning with armies of the Holy Roman Empire.
- Fourth: on a red field, two gold fishes addorsed (depicted back-to-back), haurient ("breathing" − a fish shown palewise (vertical) and head upwards), and embowed (shown bent, flexed, or curved) – County of Mömpelgard, an exclave property that passed by marriage to the Württemberg family in 1397; now modern-day Montbéliard, Franche-Comté, France.
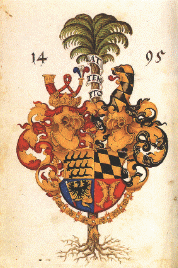
Württemberg ducal coat of arms, dated 1495

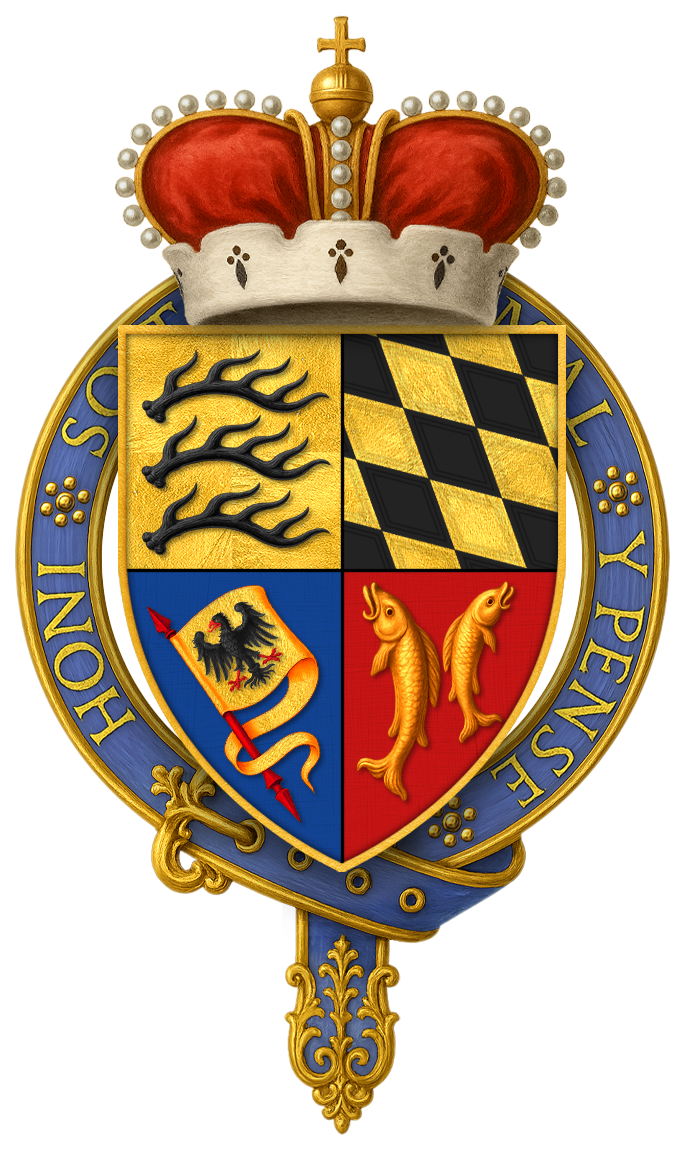
Arms of Frederick I as a Knight of the Garter, 1604

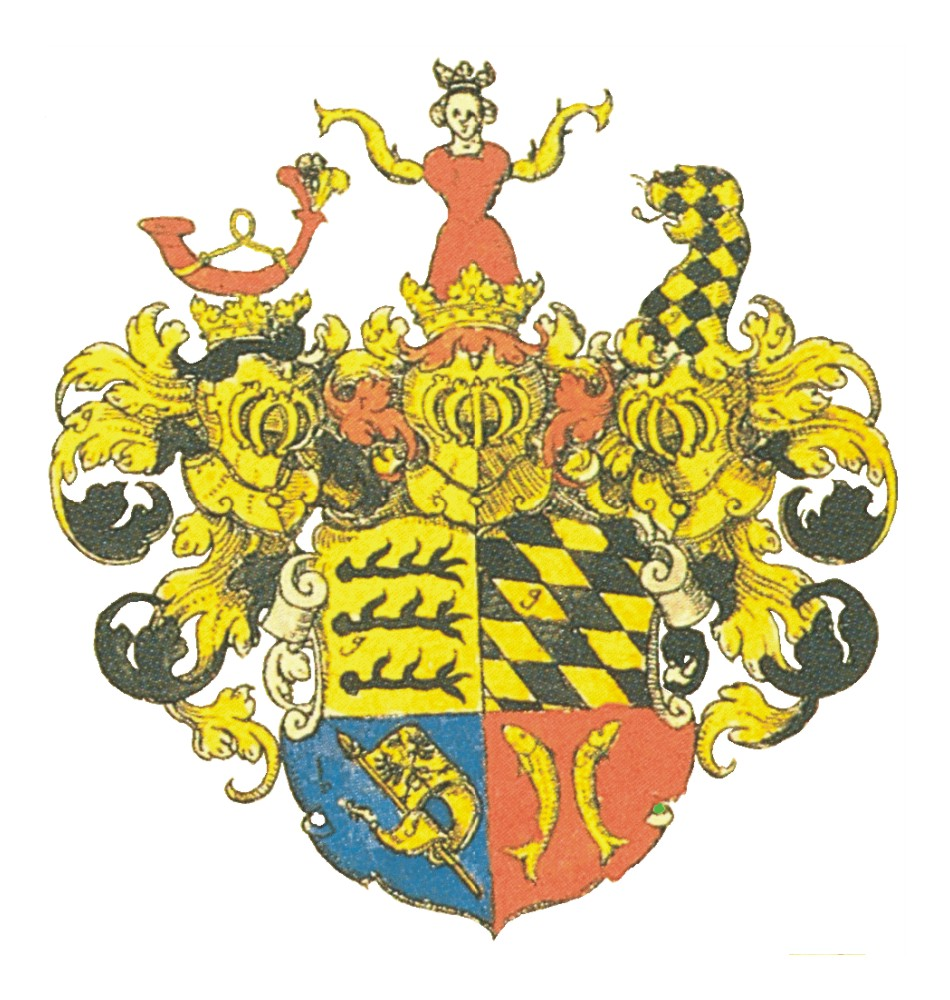
The ducal arms in 1703

=== Crests ===
- The dexter (right-hand side) crest atop the ducal arms [a red hunting horn stringed (having a rope sling of a different color) gold, enguiché (a bugle with a mouth of a different color) black, and from the mouthpiece issuant (coming up from) three plumes (feathers): red, black, and yellow] represents Bad Urach, acquired in 1260. Bad Urach's arms were [a red hunting horn with a blue baldrick (leather strap) and enguiché (a bugle with a mouth of a different color) white, and from the mouthpiece issuant (coming up from) three plumes (feathers): red, white, and blue]
- The center crest [a demi-Maiden (a female bust) couped (shown cut off with a clean edge) at the waist or thighs, crined (having hair or mane of a different color) gold and crowned (wearing a crown on the head) habited in (wearing clothes) a red gown, with fish for arms shown naiant ("swimming" - a fish shown fesswise (horizontal) with the head facing the left-hand side) and reflexed (bent in an "s" shape) gold] represents Mömpelgard.
- The sinister (left-hand side) crest [a dog's head erased (shown cut off with a ragged edge with three flaps of skin hanging from the base) lozengy black and gold] represents Teck.

Other quarterings were added in the 18th century.

== Arms used after 1918 ==
After the abdication of the last king in 1918, the Free People's State of Württemberg in the Weimar Republic continued to use the three antlers motif and the former kingdom's flag on its coat of arms. Today, the larger version of the Coat of arms of Baden-Württemberg includes the three Swabian lions and a small shield on top with the three antlers of Württemberg. The arms can also be seen in the trademark of Porsche, a local car firm.

During the Nazi era, the state of Württemberg became virtually defunct due to the de facto transformation of Germany from a federal to a unitary state. Yet the new "Gau Württemberg-Hohenzollern" adopted a new coat of arms which was only a slightly modified version of the Republican arms.

After the defeat of Nazi Germany in World War II, Württemberg was split into two successor states along the borders of the occupation zones: Württemberg-Baden in American-administered Germany, which also included the northern part of Baden, and Württemberg-Hohenzollern in the French occupation zone, which also included the Prussian territory of Hohenzollern. Both states adopted their own flags and coat of arms. They joined the Federal Republic of Germany in 1949 and were subsequently merged with South Baden into the present-day state of Baden-Württemberg in 1952.

Weimar-era arms

1933 coat of arms

Württemberg-Baden

Württemberg-Hohenzollern

== Gallery ==
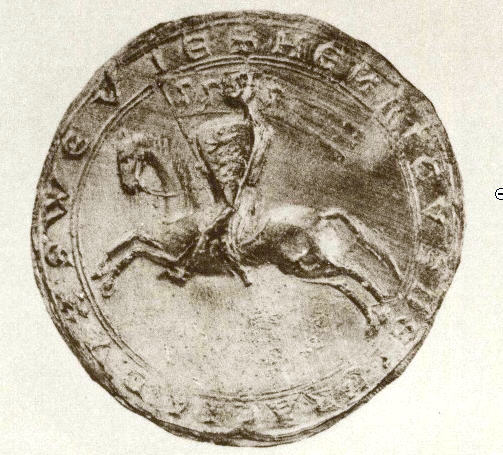
Seal of Henry II of Swabia (dated 1216) with three leopards (three lions passant guardant)

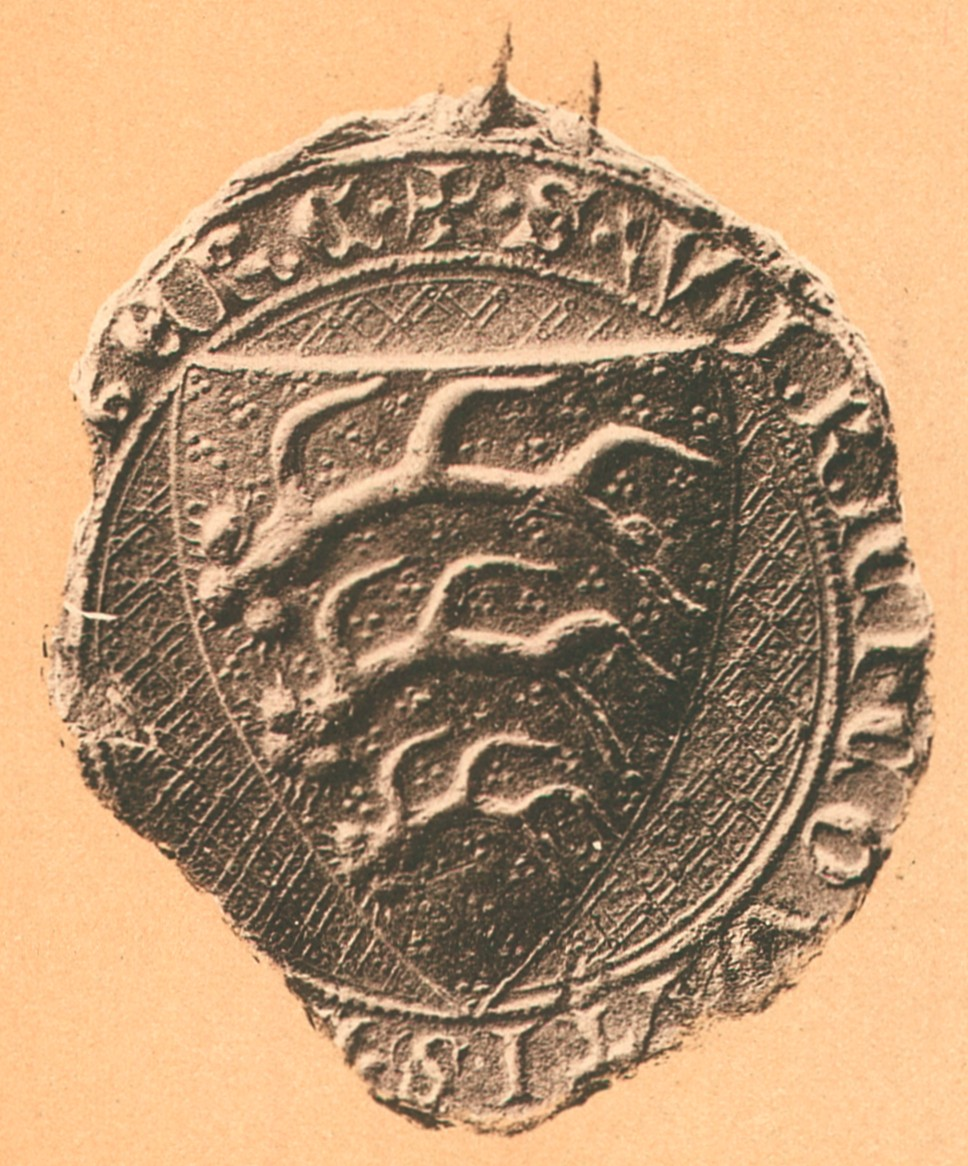
Seal of Ulrich I with three antlers, 1259

Variant arms granted to the Dukes of Urach in 1867

Arms of the Dukes of Teck 1871−1917

1817 arms

Arms of Mary of Teck as Queen consort of the United Kingdom of Great Britain and Ireland

Coat of arms of the 1st Marquess of Cambridge

Coat of arms of the 2nd Marquess of Cambridge

Coat of arms of the 1st Earl of Athlone

== See also ==
- History of Württemberg
- Origin of the coats of arms of German federal states
- Uradel
