= Duke of Cambridge =

Title in the peerage of the United Kingdom

Dukedom of Cambridge
- Creation date: 29 April 2011 (announced); 26 May 2011 (Letters Patent)
- Creation: Fifth
- Created by: Elizabeth II
- Peerage: Peerage of the United Kingdom
- First holder: Charles Stuart
- Present holder: William, Prince of Wales
- Heir apparent: Prince George
- Remainder to: the 1st Duke's heirs male of the body lawfully begotten
- Subsidiary titles: Earl of Strathearn; Baron Carrickfergus
- Status: Extant

Duke of Cambridge is a hereditary title of nobility in the British royal family, one of several royal dukedoms in the United Kingdom. The title is named after the city of Cambridge in England. It is heritable by male descendants by primogeniture, and has been conferred five times upon members of the English and later British royal families, three times in the peerage of England and twice in the peerage of the United Kingdom.

The title of Duke of Cambridge, first created in 1660, superseded an earlier title of Earl of Cambridge. The title became extinct several times before being revived in 2011, when Queen Elizabeth II bestowed it on her grandson Prince William on 29 April 2011 upon his marriage to Catherine Middleton. Catherine became known as the Duchess of Cambridge.

== History ==
The title was first granted in 1660 by Charles II of England (immediately following the Restoration of the monarchy) to his infant eldest nephew Charles Stuart (1660–1661), the first son of the Duke of York (later King James II), though he was never formally created Duke of Cambridge as he died at the age of six months. The first officially recognised creation of the dukedom was in the Peerage of England in 1664, when King Charles II granted the title to his next eldest surviving nephew James Stuart, the infant second son of the Duke of York, who died early in 1667 at the age of three, when the title again became extinct. The title was then granted later that year by King Charles II to his next eldest surviving nephew Edgar Stuart, the third son of the Duke of York, who also died in infancy, in 1671 at the age of three, when the title became extinct the third time. The Duke of York's fourth son Charles (his eldest son by his second wife) was also styled Duke of Cambridge in 1677, but died when about a month old, not having lived long enough to be formally created duke.

The title was recreated by Queen Anne in 1706 who granted it to George Augustus (later King George II), son of the Elector of Hanover (later King George I), her distant cousin (both being descended from King James I). When the title was created George Augustus was third in line to the throne, after his grandmother Sophia and his father. When he ascended to the throne as King George II in 1727, the dukedom merged with the Crown.

The title was again recreated in the peerage of the United Kingdom and was granted in 1801 by King George III to his seventh son Prince Adolphus (1774–1850), then aged 27. Following his death in 1850 the title was inherited by his only son Prince George, 2nd Duke of Cambridge, whose three sons were barred from inheriting the title as his marriage had been in violation of the Royal Marriages Act 1772. Thus on the death of the 2nd Duke in 1904 the title again became extinct.

During the period leading up to the 1999 wedding of Prince Edward, the youngest son of Queen Elizabeth II, some people speculated that the Dukedom of Cambridge or Sussex were the most likely to be granted to him, and The Sunday Telegraph later reported that Prince Edward was at one point set to be titled Duke of Cambridge. Instead, Prince Edward was created Earl of Wessex, and it was announced that he would eventually be created the next Duke of Edinburgh after his father.

On 29 April 2011, the day of his wedding, it was announced that Queen Elizabeth II had created her grandson Prince William Duke of Cambridge, Earl of Strathearn and Baron Carrickfergus, titles relating respectively to places in England, Scotland and Northern Ireland, three of the constituent countries of the United Kingdom. The letters patent granting these titles received the great seal on 26 May 2011.

Following the death of Queen Elizabeth II in 2022, William and Catherine were made Prince and Princess of Wales in addition to their titles as Duke and Duchess of Cambridge. They have henceforth been primarily referred to as the Prince and Princess of Wales.

== Dukes of Cambridge ==
=== Styled, 1660 ===
Duke	Birth	Marriage(s)	Death	Arms
Charles Stuart; House of Stuart; 1660–1661	22 October 1660; Worcester House, London Son of James, Duke of York (later King James II) and Anne Hyde	not married	5 May 1661; Whitehall Palace, London aged 6 months	

=== First creation, 1664 ===
Also: Earl of Cambridge and Baron of Dauntsey (1664)

Duke	Portrait	Birth	Marriage(s)	Death
James Stuart; House of Stuart; 1664–1667	James Stuart	12 July 1663; St James's Palace, London Son of James, Duke of York (later King James II) and Anne Hyde	not married	20 June 1667; Richmond Palace, London aged 3

=== Second creation, 1667 ===
Also: Earl of Cambridge and Baron of Dauntsey (1667)

Duke	Birth	Marriage(s)	Death
Edgar Stuart; House of Stuart; 1667–1671	14 September 1667; St James's Palace, London Son of James, Duke of York (later King James II) and Anne Hyde	not married	8 June 1671; Richmond Palace, London aged 3

=== Styled, 1677 ===
Duke	Birth	Marriage(s)	Death
Charles Stuart; House of Stuart; 1677–1677	7 November 1677; St James's Palace, London Son of James, Duke of York (later King James II) and Mary of Modena	not married	12 December 1677; St James's Palace, London aged 35 days

=== Third creation, 1706 ===
Also: Marquess of Cambridge, Earl of Milford Haven, Viscount Northallerton and Baron Tewkesbury (1706)

Duke	Portrait	Birth	Marriage(s)	Death	Arms
Prince George; House of Hanover; 1706–1727; Prince of Wales, Duke of Cornwall and Duke of Rothesay (1714)	Prince George Augustus	30 October / 9 November 1683^{O.S./N.S.} Herrenhausen, Hanover Son of Prince George of Brunswick-Lüneburg (later King George I) and Sophia Dorothea of Celle	22 August 1705; Caroline of Ansbach; 10 children	25 October 1760; Kensington Palace, London aged 76	

Prince George succeeded as George II in 1727 and his titles merged with the crown.

=== Fourth creation, 1801 ===
Also: Earl of Tipperary and Baron Culloden (1801)

Duke	Portrait	Birth	Marriage(s)	Death	Arms
Prince Adolphus; House of Hanover; 1801–1850	Prince Adolphus	24 February 1774; Buckingham Palace, London Son of King George III and Charlotte of Mecklenburg-Strelitz	18 June 1818; Princess Augusta of Hesse-Kassel; 3 children	8 July 1850; Cambridge House, London aged 76	
Prince George; House of Hanover; 1850–1904	Prince George	26 March 1819; Cambridge House, Hanover Son of Prince Adolphus and Princess Augusta	8 January 1847; Sarah Fairbrother; 3 children	17 March 1904; London aged 84	

Prince George's marriage to Sarah Fairbrother produced three sons. However, due to the Royal Marriages Act 1772, the marriage was invalid (he had not asked for Queen Victoria's approval to marry) and his children were thus illegitimate and could not succeed to his titles; so, accordingly, all his titles became extinct on his death.

=== Fifth creation, 2011 ===
Also: Earl of Strathearn and Baron Carrickfergus (2011)

Duke	Portrait	Birth	Marriage(s)	Death	Arms
Prince William; House of Windsor; 2011–present Prince of Wales, Duke of Cornwall and Duke of Rothesay (2022)		21 June 1982; St Mary's Hospital, London Eldest son of Charles, Prince of Wales (later King Charles III) and Diana, Princess of Wales	29 April 2011; Catherine Middleton; 3 children	Living (age 44)	

== Line of succession ==
If William becomes king, his titles, including the dukedom, will merge with the crown. However, if he dies before becoming king, then his sons are eligible to inherit the dukedom in birth order:

- William, Prince of Wales (born 1982)
  - (1) Prince George of Wales (born 2013)
  - (2) Prince Louis of Wales (born 2018)

== Family tree ==
Family tree of Dukes and Marquesses of Cambridge

King James VI and I (1566–1625)
Elizabeth Stuart (1596–1662); Queen of Bohemia	King Charles I (1600–1649)
Duke of Gloucester (4th creation) and Earl of Cambridge (5th creation), 1659
Sophia of Hanover (1630–1714)	King Charles II (1630–1685)	King James VII and II (1633–1701)	Henry Stuart (1640–1660); Duke of Gloucester, etc.
Dukedom of Gloucester (4th creation) and Earl of Cambridge (5th creation) extinct, 1660
Duke of Cambridge (1st creation), Earl of Cambridge (6th creation), and Baron of Dauntsey (1st creation), 1664	Duke of Cambridge (2nd creation), Earl of Cambridge (7th creation), and Baron of Dauntsey (2nd creation), 1667
King George I (1660–1727)	Charles Stuart (1660–1661) styled Duke of Cambridge	James Stuart (1663–1667); Duke of Cambridge, etc.	Edgar Stuart (1667–1671); Duke of Cambridge, etc.	Charles Stuart (1677) styled Duke of Cambridge
Dukedom of Cambridge (1st creation), Earldom of Cambridge (6th creation), and Barony of Dauntsey (1st creation) extinct, 1667	Dukedom of Cambridge (2nd creation), Earldom of Cambridge (7th creation), and Barony of Dauntsey (2nd creation) extinct, 1671
Duke of Cambridge (3rd creation) and Marquess of Cambridge (1st creation), 1706
Prince George (1683–1760); Duke of Cambridge, etc. later King George II
Dukedom of Cambridge (3rd creation) and Marquessate of Cambridge (1st creation) merged with the Crown, 1727
Prince Frederick (1707–1751); Prince of Wales
George III (1738–1820)
Duke of Cambridge (4th creation), Earl of Tipperary and Baron Culloden (1st creation), 1801
Prince Edward (1767–1820); Duke of Kent and Strathearn	Prince Adolphus (1774–1850); 1st Duke of Cambridge, etc.
Queen Victoria (1819–1901)	Prince George (1819–1904); 2nd Duke of Cambridge, etc.	Princess Mary Adelaide of Cambridge (1833–1897)
Dukedom of Cambridge (4th creation), Earldom of Tipperary, and Barony Culloden (1st creation extinct, 1904
King Edward VII (1841–1910)
Marquess of Cambridge (2nd creation), Earl of Eltham (1st creation), and Viscount Northallerton, 1917
King George V (1865–1936)	Mary of Teck (1867–1953)	Adolphus Cambridge (1868–1927); Duke of Teck, 1st Marquess of Cambridge, etc.
King Edward VIII (1894–1972)	King George VI (1895–1952)	George Francis Hugh Cambridge (1895–1981); 2nd Marquess of Cambridge, etc.
Marquessate of Cambridge (2nd creation), Earldom of Eltham (2nd creation), Viscountcy Northallerton extinct, 1981
Queen Elizabeth II (1926–2022)
King Charles III (b. 1948)
Duke of Cambridge (5th creation), Earl of Strathearn (Mountbatten-Windsor line), and Baron Carrickfergus, 2011
Prince William (b. 1982); Prince of Wales, Duke of Cornwall, Duke of Rothesay, Duke of Cambridge, etc., Earl of Chester
Prince George of Wales (b. 2013)
Heir apparent to the Dukedom of Cambridge

Family tree of British royal dukes

Includes dukes of: Albany, Albemarle, Bedford, Cambridge, Clarence, Connaught and Strathearn, Cumberland, Edinburgh, Gloucester, Gloucester and Edinburgh, Hereford, Kent, Kintyre and Lorne, Norfolk, Ross, Somerset, Sussex, Windsor, and York, but only when royally.

Non-royal dukes are not included; see Royal dukedoms in the United Kingdom.
Also not included are titles mandated for use by the heir apparent (Duke of Rothesay and the 1337 creation of the Duke of Cornwall), see Princes of Wales family tree.

King Robert II; 1316–1390	King Edward III; 1312–1377
Duke of Albany (1st creation), 1398	Duke of Clarence (1st creation), 1362	Duke of York (1st creation), 1385
King Robert III c. 1337–1406	Robert Stewart c. 1340–1420; 1st Duke of Albany	Edward the Black Prince; 1330–1376	Lionel of Antwerp; 1338–1368; Duke of Clarence	John of Gaunt; 1340–1399	Edmund; 1341–1402; 1st Duke of York
Dukedom of Clarence (1st creation) extinct, 1368
Duke of Cornwall (2nd creation), 1376	Duke of Hereford, 1397	Duke of Gloucester (1st creation), 1385
Murdoch Stewart c. 1362–1425; 2nd Duke of Albany	Richard of Bordeaux; 1367–1400; Duke of Cornwall, later King Richard II	Henry Bolingbroke; 1367–1413; Duke of Hereford, later King Henry IV	Thomas of Woodstock; 1355–1397; Duke of Gloucester
Dukedom of Albany (1st creation) forfeit, 1425	Dukedom of Cornwall (2nd creation) merged in the crown, 1377	Dukedom of Hereford merged in the crown, 1399	Dukedom of Gloucester (1st creation) extinct, 1397
Duke of Clarence (2nd creation), 1412	Duke of Bedford (1st & 2nd creations), 1414	Duke of Gloucester (2nd creation), 1414	Duke of Albemarle (Aumale) (1st creation), 1397
Thomas of Lancaster; 1387–1421; Duke of Clarence	John of Lancaster; 1389–1435; Duke of Bedford; Surrendered dukedom and then regranted, 1433	Humphrey of Lancaster; 1390–1447; Duke of Gloucester	John Beaufort; 1373–1410	Joan Beaufort c. 1379–1440	Edward of Norwich c. 1373–1415; Duke of Aumale, 2nd Duke of York	Richard of Conisburgh; 1385–1415
Dukedom of Clarence (2nd creation) extinct, 1421	Dukedom of Bedford (2nd creation) extinct, 1435	Dukedom of Gloucester (2nd creation) extinct, 1447	Dukedom of Albemarle (Aumale) (1st creation) forfeit, 1399
Duke of York (1st creation) restored, 1425; Duke of Cornwall (3rd creation), 1460
King James I 1394–1437	Joan Beaufort c. 1404–1445	Owen Tudor c. 1400–1461	John Beaufort; 1404–1444	Richard Neville; 1400–1460	Cecily Neville; 1415–1495	Richard of York; 1411–1460; 3rd Duke of York, Duke of Cornwall
Duke of Cornwall (3rd creation) extinct, 1460
Duke of Bedford (5th creation), 1485	Duke of Clarence (3rd creation), 1461	Duke of Gloucester (3rd creation), 1461
King James II; 1430–1460	Jasper Tudor c. 1431–1495; Duke of Bedford	Edmund Tudor c. 1430–1456	Lady Margaret Beaufort; 1443–1509	John Neville c. 1431–1471	Elizabeth Woodville c. 1437–1492	Edward; 1442–1483; 4th Duke of York, later King Edward IV	George Plantagenet; 1449–1478; Duke of Clarence	Richard of York; 1452–1485; Duke of Gloucester, later King Richard III
Dukedom of Bedford (5th creation) extinct, 1495	Dukedom of York (1st creation) merged in the Crown, 1461	Dukedom of Clarence (3rd creation) forfeit, 1478	Dukedom of Gloucester (3rd creation) merged in the Crown, 1483
Duke of Albany (2nd creation), 1458	Duke of Bedford (3rd creation), 1470	Duke of York (2nd creation), 1474; Duke of Norfolk (3rd creation), 1477	Duke of Bedford (4th creation), 1478
Alexander Stewart c. 1454–1485; 1st Duke of Albany	King James III; 1451/1452–1488	George Neville; 1457–1483; Duke of Bedford	King Henry VII; 1457–1509	Elizabeth of York; 1466–1503	Richard of Shrewsbury; 1473–1483; Duke of York, Duke of Norfolk	George of York; 1477–1479; Duke of Bedford
Dukedom of Bedford (3rd creation) forfeit, 1478	Dukedom of York (2nd creation) and Dukedom of Norfolk (3rd creation) extinct, 1483	Dukedom of Bedford (4th creation) extinct, 1479
Duke of Ross (1st creation), 1488	Duke of York (3rd creation), 1494	Duke of Somerset (3rd creation), 1499
John Stewart; 1482–1536; 2nd Duke of Albany	James Stewart; 1476–1504; Duke of Ross	King James IV; 1473–1513	Margaret Tudor; 1489–1541	Henry; 1491–1547; Duke of York, later King Henry VIII	Edmund Tudor; 1499–1500; Duke of Somerset (nominated but probably not invested)
Dukedom of Albany (2nd creation) extinct, 1536	Dukedom of Ross (1st creation) extinct, 1504	Dukedom of York (3rd creation) merged in the Crown, 1509	Dukedom of Somerset (3rd creation) extinct, 1500
Duke of Ross (2nd creation), 1514
King James V 1512–1542	Alexander Stewart; 1514–1515; Duke of Ross
Duke of Albany (3rd creation), 1565	Dukedom of Ross (2nd creation) extinct, 1515
Henry Stuart; 1546–1567; 1st Duke of Albany	Queen Mary; 1542–1587
James; 1566–1625; 2nd Duke of Albany, later King James VI & I
Dukedom of Albany (3rd creation) merged in the Crown, 1567
Duke of Albany (4th creation), 1604; Duke of York (4th creation), 1605	Duke of Kintyre and Lorne, 1602
Elizabeth Stuart; 1596–1662	Henry Frederick; 1594–1612	Charles; 1600–1649; Duke of Albany, Duke of York, later King Charles I	Robert Stuart; 1602; Duke of Kintyre and Lorne
Dukedom of Albany (4th creation), Dukedom of York (4th creation) merged in the Crown, 1625	Dukedom of Kintyre and Lorne extinct, 1602
Duke of York (5th creation) 1644; Duke of Albany (5th creation), 1660	Duke of Gloucester (4th creation), 1659
Sophia of Hanover; 1630–1714	James Stuart; 1633–1701; Duke of York, Duke of Albany, later King James VII & II	Henry; 1640–1660; Duke of Gloucester
Dukedom of Albany (5th creation) and Dukedom of York (5th creation) merged in the Crown, 1685	Dukedom of Gloucester (4th creation) extinct, 1660
Duke of York and Albany (1st creation), 1716	Duke of Cambridge (1st creation), 1664	Duke of Kendal (1st creation), 1666	Duke of Cambridge (2nd creation), 1667
King George I 1660–1727	Ernest Augustus; 1674–1728; Duke of York and Albany	Charles Stuart; 1660–1661 styled Duke of Cambridge	James Stuart; 1663–1667; Duke of Cambridge	Queen Anne; 1665–1714	Charles Stuart; 1666–1667 designated Duke of Kendal	Edgar Stuart; 1667–1671; Duke of Cambridge	Charles Stuart; 1677 styled Duke of Cambridge
Dukedom of York and Albany (1st creation) extinct, 1728	Dukedom of Cambridge (1st creation) extinct, 1667	Dukedom of Kendal (1st creation), extinct, 1667	Dukedom of Cambridge (2nd creation) extinct, 1671
Duke of Cambridge (3rd creation)
George; 1683–1760; Duke of Cambridge, later King George II	William; 1689–1700 styled Duke of Gloucester
Dukedom of Cambridge (3rd creation) merged with the Crown, 1727
Duke of Edinburgh (1st creation), 1726	Duke of Cumberland (3rd creation), 1726
Frederick; 1707–1751; 1st Duke of Edinburgh, styled Duke of Gloucester until created Duke of Edinburgh	William Augustus; 1721–1765; Duke of Cumberland
Dukedom of Cumberland (3rd creation) extinct, 1765
Duke of York and Albany (2nd creation), 1760	Duke of Gloucester and Edinburgh, 1764	Duke of Cumberland and Strathearn, 1766
George; 1738–1820; 2nd Duke of Edinburgh, later King George III	Edward; 1739–1767; Duke of York and Albany	William Henry; 1743–1805; 1st Duke of Gloucester and Edinburgh	Henry; 1745–1790; Duke of Cumberland and Strathearn
Dukedom of Edinburgh (1st creation), merged in the Crown, 1760	Dukedom of York and Albany (2nd creation) extinct, 1767	Dukedom of Cumberland and Strathearn extinct, 1790
Duke of York and Albany (3rd creation), 1784	Duke of Clarence and St Andrews, 1789	Duke of Kent and Strathearn, 1799	Duke of Cumberland and Teviotdale, 1799	Duke of Sussex (1st creation), 1801	Duke of Cambridge (4th creation), 1801
Frederick; 1763–1827; Duke of York and Albany	William Henry; 1765–1837, Duke of Clarence and St Andrews, later King William IV	Edward; 1767–1820; Duke of Kent and Strathearn	Ernest Augustus; 1771–1851; King of Hanover, 1st Duke of Cumberland and Teviotdale	Augustus Frederick; 1773–1843; Duke of Sussex	Adolphus; 1774–1850; 1st Duke of Cambridge	Mary; 1776–1857	William Frederick; 1776–1834; 2nd Duke of Gloucester and Edinburgh
Dukedom of York and Albany (3rd creation) extinct, 1827	Dukedom of Clarence and St Andrews merged in the Crown, 1830	Dukedom of Kent and Strathearn extinct, 1820	Dukedom of Sussex (1st creation) extinct, 1843	Dukedom of Gloucester and Edinburgh extinct, 1834
Queen Victoria; 1819–1901	George V 1819–1878; King of Hanover, 2nd Duke of Cumberland and Teviotdale	George; 1819–1904; 2nd Duke of Cambridge	Mary Adelaide; 1833–1897
Dukedom of Cambridge (4th creation) extinct, 1904
Duke of Edinburgh (2nd creation), 1866	Duke of Connaught and Strathearn, 1874	Duke of Albany (6th creation), 1881
King Edward VII; 1841–1910	Ernest Augustus; 1845–1923; 3rd Duke of Cumberland and Teviotdale	Alice; 1843–1878	Alfred Ernest Albert; 1844–1900; Duke of Edinburgh	Arthur; 1850–1942; 1st Duke of Connaught and Strathearn	Leopold; 1853–1884; 1st Duke of Albany
Dukedom of Cumberland and Teviotdale forfeit, 1919	Dukedom of Edinburgh (2nd creation) extinct, 1900
Duke of Clarence and Avondale, 1890	Duke of York (6th creation), 1892
Albert Victor; 1864–1892; Duke of Clarence and Avondale	George; 1865–1936; Duke of York, later King George V	Mary of Teck; 1867–1953	Victoria of Hesse and by Rhine; 1863–1950	Arthur of Connaught; 1883–1938
Dukedom of Clarence and Avondale extinct, 1892	Dukedom of York (6th creation) merged in the Crown, 1910
Duke of Windsor, 1937	Duke of York (7th creation), 1920	Duke of Kent (2nd creation), 1934	Duke of Gloucester (5th creation), 1928
King Edward VIII; 1894–1972; Later Duke of Windsor	Albert; 1895–1952; Duke of York, later King George VI	Alice of Battenberg; 1885–1969	George; 1902–1942; 1st Duke of Kent	Henry; 1900–1974; 1st Duke of Gloucester	Alastair Arthur; 1914–1943; 2nd Duke of Connaught and Strathearn	Charles Edward; 1884–1954; 2nd Duke of Albany
Dukedom of Windsor extinct, 1972	Dukedom of York (7th creation) merged in the Crown, 1936	Dukedom of Connaught and Strathearn extinct, 1943	Dukedom of Albany (6th creation) forfeit, 1919
Duke of Edinburgh (3rd creation), 1947
Queen Elizabeth II; 1926–2022	Philip; 1921–2021; 1st Duke of Edinburgh	Edward b. 1935; 2nd Duke of Kent
Duke of York (8th creation), 1986 (revoked 2025)	Duke of Edinburgh (4th creation), 2023
Charles b. 1948; 2nd Duke of Edinburgh, later King Charles III	Andrew b. 1960; Duke of York	Edward b. 1964; Duke of Edinburgh	George Windsor b. 1962	Richard b. 1944; 2nd Duke of Gloucester
Dukedom of Edinburgh (3rd creation) merged in the Crown, 2022	No male heirs	Dukedom of Edinburgh (4th creation) is a life peerage and therefore not hereditary	Heir apparent to the Dukedom of Kent
Duke of Cambridge (5th creation), 2011	Duke of Sussex (2nd creation), 2018
William b. 1982; Duke of Cambridge	Harry b. 1984; Duke of Sussex	Edward Windsor b. 1988	Alexander Windsor b. 1974
Heir-apparent to the Dukedom of Gloucester
George of Wales b. 2013	Archie of Sussex b. 2019
Heir apparent to the Dukedom of Cambridge	Heir apparent to the Dukedom of Sussex

== See also ==
- Duke of Cambridge's Personal Canadian Flag
- Marquess of Cambridge
- Earl of Cambridge
