= 359 Georgia =

Main-belt asteroid

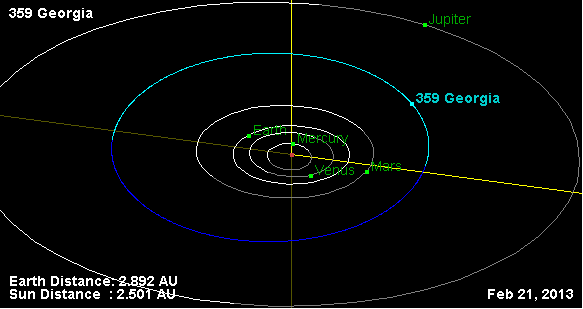
- Orbital diagram

Discovery
- Discovered by: Auguste Charlois
- Discovery date: March 10, 1893

Designations
- Pronunciation: /ˈdʒɔːrdʒə/ JOR-jə
- Named after: King George II
- Alternative designations: 1893 M
- Minor planet category: Main belt

Orbital characteristics
- Epoch 31 July 2016 (JD 2457600.5)
- Uncertainty parameter 0
- Observation arc: 114.10 yr (41676 d)
- Aphelion: 3.1562 AU (472.16 Gm)
- Perihelion: 2.2999 AU (344.06 Gm)
- Semi-major axis: 2.7280 AU (408.10 Gm)
- Eccentricity: 0.15693
- Orbital period (sidereal): 4.51 yr (1645.8 d)
- Mean anomaly: 323.972°
- Mean motion: 0° 13^{m} 7.464^{s} / day
- Inclination: 6.7716°
- Longitude of ascending node: 6.0731°
- Argument of perihelion: 338.526°

Physical characteristics
- Mean diameter: 48 ± 4 km (composite estimate)
- Synodic rotation period: 5.537 h (0.2307 d)
- Geometric albedo: 0.23 ± 0.02 (composite estimate)
- Spectral type: X
- Absolute magnitude (H): 8.86

359 Georgia is a typical Main belt asteroid. It is classified as an X-type asteroid.

It was discovered by Auguste Charlois on March 10, 1893 in Nice. It was named by the daughter of Felix Klein at a meeting of the Astronomische Gesellschaft in 1902 held at the Georg August University of Göttingen, where Klein was a professor. It was named after the University's founder King George II of Great Britain, Elector of Hanover.
