= Earl of Cambridge =

Nobility title

Earl of Cambridge later superseded by the title of Duke of Cambridge
- Creation date: 1340 (1st creation); 1362 (2nd creation); 1414 (3rd creation); 1619 (4th creation); 1659 (5th creation); 1664 (6th creation); 1667 (7th creation)
- Peerage: Peerage of England
- First holder: William of Juliers, 1st Earl of Cambridge
- Last holder: Edgar Stuart, Earl of Cambridge
- Extinction date: 1361 (1st creation); 1414 (2nd creation); 1483 (3rd creation); 1651 (4th creation); 1660 (5th creation); 1667 (6th creation); 1671 (7th creation)

The title of Earl of Cambridge was created several times in the Peerage of England. Since 1362, the title has been closely associated with the Royal family (see also Duke of Cambridge, Marquess of Cambridge).

The first Earl of the fourth creation, the Marquess of Hamilton, was at the time sixth in line to the Crown of Scotland (after the Duke of Rothesay, later King Charles I, his sister Elizabeth and her children); his grandfather Lord Arran had been heir-presumptive to, and Regent for, Mary, Queen of Scots.

The Duke of Hamilton currently holds the title Earl of Arran and Cambridge in the Peerage of Scotland, which is not related to this earldom. From 1664, the title Duke of Cambridge superseded that of the Earl of Cambridge.

== Earls of Cambridge, 1st Creation (1340) ==
- William of Juliers, 1st Earl of Cambridge (1299–1361)

== Earls of Cambridge, 2nd Creation (1362) ==
- Edmund of Langley, 1st Duke of York (1341–1402)
- Edward of Norwich, 2nd Duke of York (c. 1373–1415), resigned 1414

== Earls of Cambridge, 3rd Creation (1414) ==
- Richard of Conisburgh, 1st Earl of Cambridge (1385–1415)
- Richard Plantagenet, 3rd Duke of York (1411–1460)
- Edward Plantagenet, 4th Duke of York (1442–1483), merged in crown 1461

== Earls of Cambridge, 4th Creation (1619) ==
The subsidiary title was Baron of Innerdale (1619).

- James Hamilton, 2nd Marquess of Hamilton (1589–1625)
- James Hamilton, 1st Duke of Hamilton (1606–1649)
- William Hamilton, 2nd Duke of Hamilton (1616–1651) extinct

== Earls of Cambridge, 5th Creation (1659) ==
- Henry Stuart, Duke of Gloucester (1640–1660) extinct

== Earls of Cambridge, 6th Creation (1664) ==
- James Stuart, Duke of Cambridge (1663–1667)

== Earls of Cambridge, 7th Creation (1667) ==
- Edgar Stuart, Duke of Cambridge (1667–1671)

== Family tree ==
Douglas-Hamilton family trees: Dukes of: Abercorn, Brandon, and Hamilton with subsidiary and courtesy titles

James II; 1430–1460; King of Scotland
Earl of Arran (Scotland) (1st creation), 1467	Lord Hamilton, 1445
Thomas Boyd d. c. 1473; Earl of Arran	Mary Stewart; 1453–1488 dowager Countess of Arran	James Hamilton c. 1415–1479; 1st Lord Hamilton	James III; 1451–1488; King of Scotland
Earldom of Arran (1st creation) forfeit, 1469
Earl of Arran (Scotland) (2nd creation), 1503
James Hamilton c. 1475–1529; 2nd Lord Hamilton, 1st Earl of Arran	James IV; 1473–1513; King of Scotland
Catherine Stewart (illegit.) c. 1495–1554	James Douglas d. 1548; Earl of Morton
Duke of Châtellerault (France) (5th creation), 1548
James Hamilton c. 1516–1575; 2nd Earl of Arran, 3rd Lord Hamilton, 1st Duke of Châtellerault	Margaret Douglas c. 1510–1579
Dukedom of Châtellerault (5th creation) forfeit, 1559
Marquess of Hamilton, Earl of Arran, and Lord Aven, 1599	Lord Paisley, 1587
James Hamilton c. 1533–1609; 3rd Earl of Arran, 4th Lord Hamilton	Anne Hamilton c. 1535 – c. 1574 m. George Gordon Earl of Huntly	John Hamilton; 1540–1604; 1st Marquess of Hamilton, etc.	Claud Hamilton; 1546–1621; Lord Paisley
Earl of Cambridge (England) (4th creation) and Baron of Innerdale, 1619	Lord Abercorn, 1603; Earl of Abercorn, Lord of Paisley, Hamilton, Mountcastell and Kilpatrick, 1606
George Gordon; 1562–1636; Marquess of Huntly	James Hamilton; 1589–1625; 2nd Marquess of Hamilton, etc., 4th Earl of Arran, 1st Earl of Cambridge, etc. 5th Lord Hamilton, Lord Aberbrothwick/Arbroath	James Hamilton; 1575–1618; 1st Earl of Abercorn, Lord Abercorn and Lord of Paisley, Hamilton, Mountcastell and Kilpatrick
Earldom of Angus (1389 creation) resigned in favor of: Marquess of Douglas, Earl of Angus, Lord Abernethy, Lord Bonkyll and Preston, Lord Abernethy, and Lord Jedburgh Forest, 1633	Duke of Hamilton, Marquess of Clydesdale, Earl of Arran and Cambridge (Scotland) and Baron of Aven and Innerdale, 1643	Earl of Lanark, 1639	Baron Hamilton of Strabane, 1617
William Douglas; 1589–1660; 1st Marquess of Douglas, etc. 11th Earl of Angus (1389 creation)	Mary Gordon c. 1600–1674	James Hamilton; 1606–1649; 1st Duke of Hamilton, etc., 3rd Marquess of Hamilton, etc., 5th Earl of Arran, 2nd Earl of Cambridge, etc.	William Hamilton; 1616–1651; 2nd Duke of Hamilton, etc., 1st Earl of Lanark, 6th Earl of Arran, 3rd Earl of Cambridge, etc.	James Hamilton c. 1604 – c. 1670; 2nd Earl of Abercorn, etc., 2nd Lord Paisley, 1st Lord Hamilton of Strabane	Claud Hamilton c. 1606–1638; 2nd Lord Hamilton of Strabane	George Hamilton c. 1607–1679
Earldom of Cambridge (4th creation) and Barony of Innerdale extinct and Earldom of Arran (2nd creation) dormant, 1651
Earl of Selkirk and Lord Daer and Shortcleuch, 1646
see Earl of Ormond family tree for Marquesses of Douglas, Earls of Angus, etc.	William Douglas-Hamilton; 1634–1694 jure uxoris Duke of Hamilton, etc. suo jure, 1st Earl of Selkirk, etc.	Anne Hamilton; 1631–1716 suo jure 3rd Duchess of Hamilton, etc., 2nd Countess of Lanark	George Hamilton c. 1636 – c. 1680; 3rd Earl of Abercorn, etc.	James Hamilton c. 1633 – c. 1670; Lord Paisley	James Hamilton; 1633–1655; 3rd Lord Hamilton of Strabane	George Hamilton c. 1636–1668; 4th Lord Hamilton of Strabane	James Hamilton c. 1620–1673
Ceded Dukedom of Hamilton to 4th Duke, 1698
Duke of Brandon and Baron Dutton, 1711	Earl of Ruglen, 1697	Earl of Orkney (3rd creation), 1697	Viscount Strabane and Baron Mountcastle, 1701
James Hamilton; 1658–1712; 4th Duke of Hamilton, etc., 1st Duke of Brandon, etc. 3rd Earl of Lanark, etc.	Charles Douglas; 1663–1739; 2nd Earl of Selkirk, etc.	John Douglas-Hamilton; 1664–1744; 3rd Earl of Selkirk, etc., 1st Earl of Ruglen	George Hamilton; 1666–1737; 1st Earl of Orkney	Basil Hamilton; 1671–1701	Catherine Hamilton	Charles Hamilton d. 1701; 5th Earl of Abercorn, etc., 6th Lord Hamilton of Strabane	Claud Hamilton; 1658–1691; 4th Earl of Abercorn, etc., 5th Lord Hamilton of Strabane	James Hamilton c. 1661–1734; 6th Earl of Abercorn, etc., 7th Lord Hamilton of Strabane
see Earls of Ruglen	see Earls of Orkney	Basil Hamilton; 1696–1742	James Hamilton; 1685–1744; 7th Earl of Abercorn, etc., 8th Lord Hamilton of Strabane
Viscount Hamilton, 1786
James Hamilton; 1703–1743; 5th Duke of Hamilton, etc., 2nd Duke of Brandon, etc. 4th Earl of Lanark, etc.	Lord Anne Hamilton; 1709–1748	Dunbar Douglas; 1722–1799; 4th Earl of Selkirk, etc.	James Hamilton; 1712–1789; 8th Earl of Abercorn, etc., 9th Lord Hamilton of Strabane, 1st Viscount Hamilton	John Hamilton; 1714–1755
Baron Hamilton of Hameldon county, Leicester, 1776	Marquess of Abercorn, 1790
James Hamilton; 1724–1758; 6th Duke of Hamilton, etc., 3rd Duke of Brandon, etc., 5th Earl of Lanark, etc.	Elizabeth Gunning (c. 1733–1790) suo jure 1st Baroness Hamilton	Archibald Hamilton; 1740–1819; 9th Duke of Hamilton, etc., 6th Duke of Brandon, 8th Earl of Lanark, etc.	Charles Powell Hamilton; 1747–1825	John Hamilton; 1756–1818; 1st Marquess of Abercorn, 9th Earl of Abercorn, etc., 10th Lord Hamilton of Strabane
James Hamilton; 1755–1769; 7th Duke of Hamilton, etc., 4th Duke of Brandon and Baron Dutton, Marquess of Angus and Abernethy, 4th Marquess of Douglas, etc., 6th Earl of Lanark, etc.	Douglas Hamilton; 1756–1799; 8th Duke of Hamilton, etc., 5th Duke of Brandon, Marquess of Douglas, etc.<>br/>7th Earl of Lanark, etc., 2nd Baron Hamilton	Alexander Hamilton; 1767–1852; 10th Duke of Hamilton, etc., 7th Duke of Brandon, Marquess of Douglas, and Baron Dutton, Earl of Angus, and Lord Abernethy and Jedburgh Forest, 9th Earl of Lanark, etc.	Augustus Barrington Price Anne Powell Douglas-Hamilton; 1781–1849	Thomas Douglas; 1771–1820; 5th Earl of Selkirk, etc.	James Hamilton; 1786–1818 styled Viscount Hamilton
Duke of Abercorn, of Strabane and Duke of Abercorn, 1868
William Alexander Anthony Archibald Hamilton; 1811–1863; 11th Duke of Hamilton, etc., 8th Duke of Brandon, Marquess of Douglas, Earl of Angus, Lord Abernethy and Jedburgh Forest, and Baron Dutton, 10th Earl of Lanark, etc.	Charles Douglas-Hamilton; 1808–1873	Dunbar James Douglas; 1809–1885; 6th Earl of Selkirk, etc.	James Hamilton; 1811–1885; 1st Duke of Abercorn, 2nd Marquess of Abercorn, 10th Earl of Abercorn, etc., 2nd Viscount Hamilton, 11th Lord Hamilton of Strabane
Duke of Châtellerault (France) (5th creation), revived 1548
William Alexander Louis Stephen Douglas-Hamilton; 1845–1895; 12th Duke of Hamilton, etc., 9th Duke of Brandon, Marquess of Douglas, Earl of Angus, Lord Abernethy and Jedburgh Forest and Baron Dutton, 2nd Duke of Châtellerault, 8th Earl of Selkirk, etc., 11th Earl of Lanark, etc.	Charles George Douglas-Hamilton; 1847–1886; 7th Earl of Selkirk, etc.	James Hamilton; 1838–1913; 2nd Duke of Abercorn, 3rd Marquess of Abercorn, 11th Earl of Abercorn, etc., 12th Lord Hamilton of Strabane
Alfred Douglas Douglas-Hamilton; 1862–1940; 13th Duke of Hamilton, etc., 10th Duke of Brandon, Marquess of Douglas, Earl of Angus (1633 creation), Lord Abernethy and Jedburgh Forest, and Baron Dutton, 20th Earl of Angus (1389 creation), 9th Earl of Selkirk, etc., 12th Earl of Lanark, etc.	James Albert Edward Hamilton; 1869–1953; 3rd Duke of Abercorn, 4th Marquess of Abercorn, 12th Earl of Abercorn, etc., 13th Lord Hamilton of Strabane
Douglas Douglas-Hamilton; 1903–1973; 14th Duke of Hamilton, etc., 11th Duke of Brandon, Marquess of Douglas, Earl of Angus (1633 creation), Lord Abernethy and Jedburgh Forest, and Baron Dutton, 21st Earl of Angus (1389 creation), 13rd Earl of Lanark, etc.	George Nigel Douglas-Hamilton; 1906–1994; 10th Earl of Selkirk, etc., 10th Lord Daer and Shortcleuch	Malcolm Douglas-Hamilton; 1909–1964	James Edward Hamilton; 1904–1979; 4th Duke of Abercorn, 5th Marquess of Abercorn, 13th Earl of Abercorn, etc., 14th Lord Hamilton of Strabane
Baron Selkirk of Douglas, 1997
Angus Alan Douglas Douglas-Hamilton; 1938–2010; 15th Duke of Hamilton, etc., 12th Duke of Brandon, Marquess of Douglas, Earl of Angus (1633 creation), Lord Abernethy and Jedburgh Forest, and Baron Dutton, 22nd Earl of Angus (1389 creation), 14th Earl of Lanark, etc.	James Alexander Douglas-Hamilton; 1942–2023; 11th Earl of Selkirk, etc., Earldom disclaimed, 1994, Baron Selkirk of Douglas	Alasdair Douglas-Hamilton b. 1939	James Hamilton b. 1934; 5th Duke of Abercorn, 6th Marquess of Abercorn, 14th Earl of Abercorn, etc., 15th Lord Hamilton of Strabane
Barony Selkirk of Douglas expired as a life peerage, 2023
Alexander Douglas-Hamilton b. 1978; 16th Duke of Hamilton, etc., 13th Duke of Brandon, Marquess of Douglas, Earl of Angus (1633 creation), Lord Abernethy and Jedburgh Forest, and Baron Dutton, 23rd Earl of Angus (1389 creation), 15th Earl of Lanark and Lord Machanshyre and Polmont	John William Douglas-Hamilton b. 1979	John Andrew Douglas-Hamilton b. 1978; 12th Earl of Selkirk, etc.	Charles Douglas Douglas-Hamilton (b. 1979)	Angus Gavin Douglas-Hamilton b. 1968	James Hamilton b. 1969 styled Marquess of Hamilton
Heir presumptive to the Earldom of Selkirk
Douglas Douglas-Hamilton b. 2012 styled Marquess of Douglas and Clydesdale	William Frederick Douglas-Hamilton b. 2014	Basil George Douglas-Hamilton b. 2016	William Douglas-Hamilton b. 1999	James Hamilton b. 2005 styled Viscount Strabane
Heir apparent to the dukedoms of Hamilton and Brandon

== See also ==
- Duke of Cambridge
- Peerages in the United Kingdom
