= Baron of Dauntsey =

Extinct barony in the Peerage of England

The title Baron of Dauntsey, of Wiltshire in the Peerage of England, was twice created as a subsidiary title for the Dukes of Cambridge, sons of James II of England both of whom died in childhood. The first creation was on 23 August 1664 and the second on 14 September 1667.

== Barons of Dauntsey, first Creation (1664) ==
- James Stuart, Duke of Cambridge (1663–1667)

== Barons of Dauntsey, second Creation (1667) ==
- Edgar Stuart, Duke of Cambridge (1667–1671)
