= Baron Carrickfergus =

Barony in the Peerage of the United Kingdom

- Barún Charraig Fhearghais (Irish)
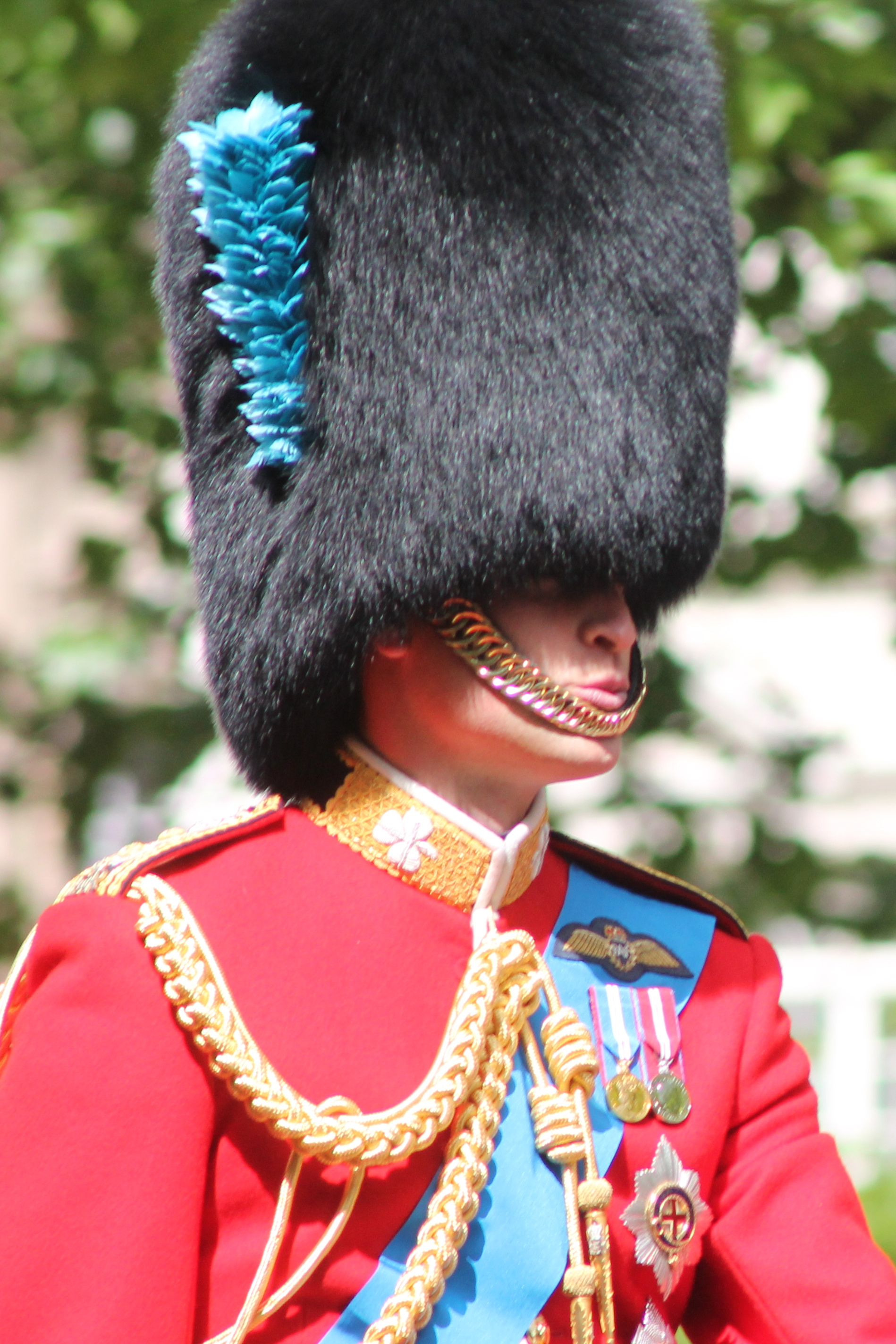
- Incumbent; William since 29 April 2011
- Term length: Life tenure or until accession as Sovereign

Baron Carrickfergus is a title in the peerage of the United Kingdom, referring to Carrickfergus in County Antrim, Northern Ireland. Its current holder, since its creation on 29 April 2011, is William, Prince of Wales, who was granted the title as a personal gift by Elizabeth II, on the day of his marriage to Catherine Middleton. On the same day he was also created Duke of Cambridge and Earl of Strathearn, with his bride becoming "Her Royal Highness The Duchess of Cambridge" as well as Countess of Strathearn and Baroness Carrickfergus as a result of the marriage. Traditionally, when male members of the British royal family marry, they are granted at least one peerage. Catherine uses the title "Lady Carrickfergus" in a fuller version of her titles and styles, Her Royal Highness The Princess of Wales, Countess of Strathearn and Baroness Carrickfergus.

== History of title and town ==
A barony, referring to Carrickfergus, had previously existed between 1841 and 1883. In 1841, George Chichester, 3rd Marquess of Donegall, was created by Queen Victoria as Baron Ennishowen and Carrickfergus, of Ennishowen, in the County of Donegal, and Carrickfergus, in the County of Antrim, in the peerage of the United Kingdom. When he died in 1883, the Barony of Ennishowen and Carrickfergus became extinct; the Marquessate of Donegall was inherited by his brother, Lord Edward Chichester.

Carrickfergus is the oldest town in County Antrim and is an older settlement than the capital city of Northern Ireland, Belfast. It has been a major port and town in the Province of Ulster for centuries. Its name translated from Irish means "Rock of Fergus", and Carrickfergus's main feature is Carrickfergus Castle, on the north shore of the Belfast Lough, which was built around 1180 by John de Courcy.

== Baron Carrickfergus (2011) ==
William, Prince of Wales (b. 1982) is the present holder of the title. The heir apparent is his elder son, Prince George of Wales (born 2013), who is followed in the line of succession by his brother, Prince Louis (born 2018). Princess Charlotte is not part of the line of succession as the barony runs only through the male line.
