= Charles Stuart, Duke of Cambridge (1677) =

Charles Stuart
- Duke of Cambridge
- Born: 7 November 1677; St James's Palace, London, England
- Died: 12 December 1677 (aged 35 days); St James's Palace, London, England
- Burial: 13 December 1677; Westminster Abbey
- House: Stuart
- Father: James, Duke of York
- Mother: Mary of Modena

Charles Stuart (7 November 1677 – 12 December 1677) was the first of two sons and third of seven children born from the marriage between James, Duke of York (later James II of England & VII of Scotland) and Mary of Modena. He was styled Duke of Cambridge, but never formally created so, as he died aged one month.

== Life ==
At the time of his birth at St James's Palace, Charles was the second surviving child of James and Mary, a sister, Catherine Laura, having died the previous year. Another sister, Isabella, one year older than Charles, died at the age of four in 1681. At the time of Charles's birth, his uncle, Charles II of England, had no legitimate children and his queen consort, Catherine of Braganza, was reaching the age of 40 and it was clear that she would have no children and that the Duke of York would succeed as King.

Because all of James's sons with his first wife, Anne Hyde, were dead, the newborn Charles was in direct line to the throne, a possibility that caused concern in England and Scotland because both James and Mary were Catholics and the majority of people wanted a Protestant monarch. Like so many of his brothers and sisters, the infant lived for a little more than a month, dying on 12 December the same year he was born. Charles was buried in Westminster Abbey, on 13 December 1677. His younger brother was James Francis Edward Stuart, The Old Pretender.

== Arms ==
During his short life, Charles bore a coat of arms, as a grandson of a British sovereign, consisting those of the kingdom, differenced by a label argent of five points ermine.

== Ancestry ==
Ancestors of Charles Stuart, Duke of Cambridge (1677)

8. James I of England
4. Charles I of England
9. Anne of Denmark
2. James II of England
10. Henry IV of France
5. Henrietta Maria of France
11. Marie de' Medici
1. Charles Stuart, Duke of Cambridge
12. Francesco I d'Este, Duke of Modena
6. Alfonso IV d'Este, Duke of Modena
13. Maria Farnese
3. Mary of Modena
14. Hieronymus Martinozzi
7. Laura Martinozzi
15. Laura Margherita Mazzarini

Charles Stuart, Duke of Cambridge (1677) House of Stuart Cadet branch of the Clan Stuart Born: 7 November 1677 Died: 12 December 1677
Peerage of England
| Vacant Title last held by Edgar Stuart | Duke of Cambridge; 7 November – 12 December 1677 | Vacant Title next held by George of Hanover |

== Bibliography ==
- Panton, Kenneth J. (2011). Historical Dictionary of the British Monarchy. G - Reference, Information and Interdisciplinary Subjects Series. Scarecrow Press. ISBN 978-0-8108-5779-7.
