= Edgar Stuart, Duke of Cambridge =

17th-century British prince

Edgar Stuart
- Duke of Cambridge
- Born: 14 September 1667; St James's Palace, London, England
- Died: 8 June 1671 (aged 3); Richmond Palace, Surrey, England
- Burial: 12 June 1671; Westminster Abbey
- House: Stuart
- Father: James, Duke of York
- Mother: Anne Hyde

Edgar Stuart, Duke of Cambridge (14 September 1667 – 8 June 1671) was the fourth son of James, Duke of York (later James II of England) and his first wife Anne Hyde. He was second in the line of succession to the English and Scottish thrones.

== Life ==
Edgar was born on 14 September 1667 at St James's Palace and baptized there with the Duke of Albemarle, the Marquis of Worcester, and the Countess of Suffolk as sponsors. The name "Edgar" had ancient roots in both the English (Edgar the Peaceful) and Scottish (Edgar, King of Scotland) monarchies. On 7 October 1667 he was created Duke and Earl of Cambridge and Baron of Dauntsey. His elder brother Charles had died at the age of six months in 1661 before the patent for the title of Duke of Cambridge was passed and another brother, James, was formally created Duke of Cambridge before his death in 1667 at the age of three. Edgar's titles became extinct until the birth of another son, also named Charles, in 1677.

His mother was ill for months following his birth and never fully recovered, though she gave birth twice more to daughters who died before their first birthdays; she died on 13 March 1671. Edgar died at Richmond Palace on 8 June 1671 leading to official mourning. He was entombed in the royal vault in the Henry VII Chapel in Westminster Abbey on 12 June 1671, his coffin placed atop that of his mother.

== Legacy ==
The town of Edgartown, Massachusetts, on Martha's Vineyard, settled in 1642, was named for him when incorporated in 1671, shortly before news of his death reached North America. Martha's Vineyard was then part of the proprietary colony of New York, given to Edgar's father the Duke of York in 1664 by Charles II.

== Arms ==
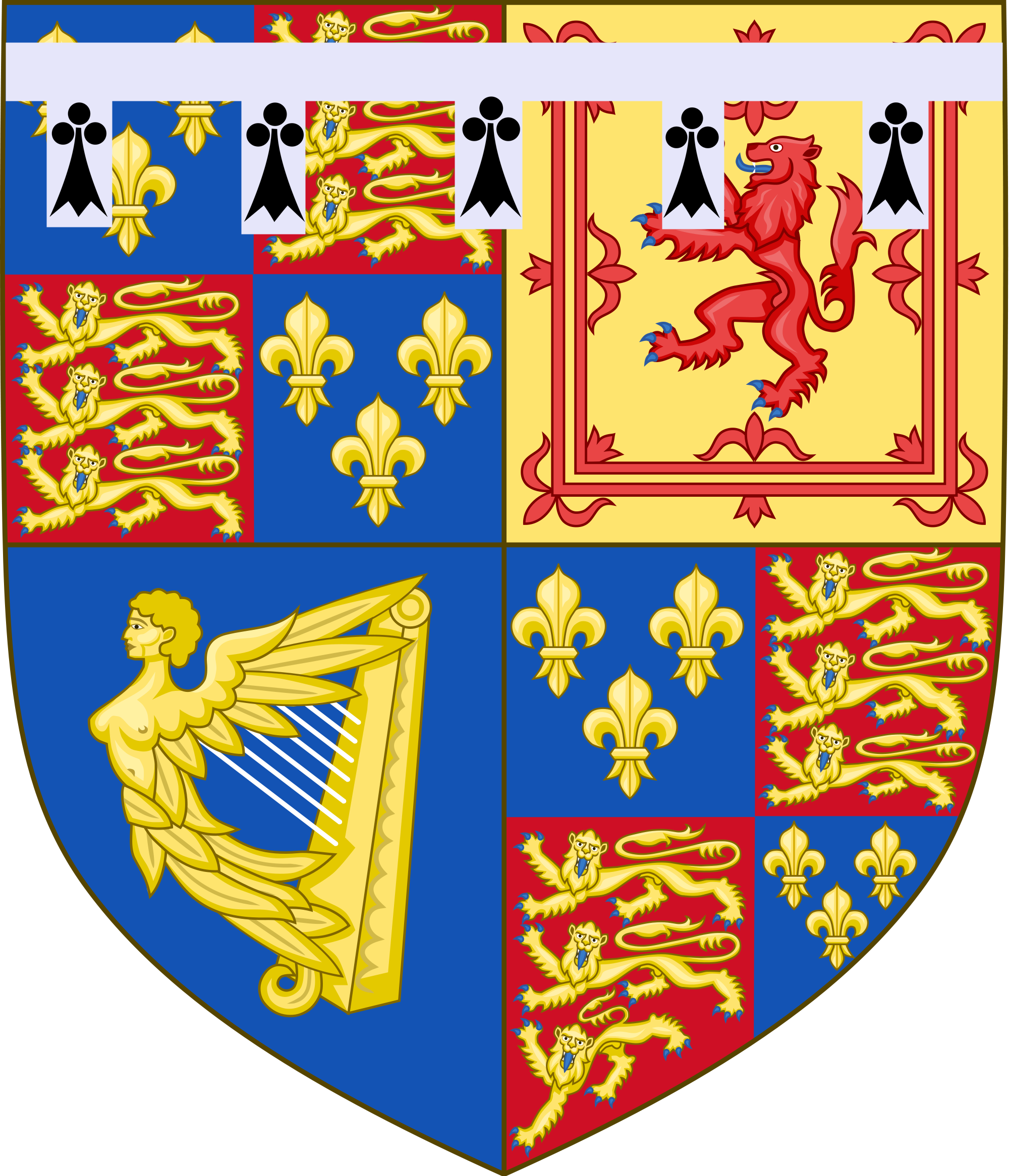
Coat of arms as Duke of Cambridge

Edgar bore a coat of arms, as a grandson of a British Sovereign, consisting those of the kingdom, differenced by a label argent of five points ermine.

== Ancestry ==
Ancestors of Edgar Stuart, Duke of Cambridge

8. James I of England
4. Charles I of England
9. Anne of Denmark
2. James II of England
10. Henry IV of France
5. Henrietta Maria of France
11. Marie de' Medici
1. Edgar Stuart, Duke of Cambridge
12. Henry Hyde
6. Edward Hyde, 1st Earl of Clarendon
13. Mary Langford
3. Anne Hyde
14. Sir Thomas Aylesbury, 1st Bt
7. Frances Aylesbury
15. Anne Denman
