= Frances Hyde, Countess of Clarendon =

English peeress (1617–1667)

The Countess of Clarendon
- Born: 1617
- Died: 1667 (aged 49–50)
- Buried: Westminster Abbey
- Spouse: Edward Hyde, 1st Earl of Clarendon
- Issue: Henry Hyde, 2nd Earl of Clarendon; Laurence Hyde, 1st Earl of Rochester; Edward Hyde; James Hyde; Anne, Duchess of York; Frances Hyde
- Father: Sir Thomas Aylesbury, 1st Baronet

Frances Hyde, Countess of Clarendon (née Aylesbury; 25 August 1617 (baptised) – 8 August 1667) was an English peeress. As the mother of Anne Hyde, she was mother-in-law to James, Duke of York, later king of England, Scotland, and Ireland, and the maternal grandmother of Mary II and Queen Anne.

== Biography ==
Frances Aylesbury was the daughter and eventually sole heiress of Sir Thomas Aylesbury, 1st Baronet, and his wife, Anne Denman. The translator William Aylesbury was her brother.

On 10 July 1634 she became the second wife of Edward Hyde, who was later created Baron Hyde (in 1660) and Earl of Clarendon (in 1661). He was Lord Chancellor of England 1658–1667. They had six children:

- Lady Anne (1637–1671), married King James II/VII in 1659. Had issue.
  - Charles Stuart, Duke of Cambridge b. 22 Oct 1660, d. 5 May 1661 of smallpox
  - Mary II of England b. 30 Apr 1662, d. 28 Dec 1694
  - James Stuart, Duke of Cambridge b. 12 Jul 1663, d. 20 Jun 1667
  - Anne, Queen of Great Britain b. 6 Feb 1664/65, d. 1 Aug 1714
  - Charles Stuart, Duke of Kendal b. 4 Jul 1666, d. 22 May 1667
  - Edgar Stuart, Duke of Cambridge b. 14 Sep 1667, d. 8 Jun 1671
  - Henrietta Stuart b. 13 Jan 1668/69, d. 15 Nov 1669
  - Catherine Stuart b. 9 Feb 1670/71, d. 5 Dec 1671
- Hon. Henry, later 2nd Earl of Clarendon (1638–1709), married Theodosia Capell in 1660. Had issue.
  - Edward Hyde, 3rd Earl of Clarendon, (1661–1723), married Katherine O'Brien in 1685. Had issue.
- Hon. Laurence, later 1st Earl of Rochester (1641–1711), married Henrietta Hyde, Countess of Rochester in 1665. Had issue.
  - Henry Hyde, 4th Earl of Clarendon, (1672–1753), married Jane Hyde, Countess of Clarendon in 1692. Had issue.
- Hon. Edward (1645–1665)
- Hon. James (died young)
- Lady Frances Keightley, married Thomas Keightley, Irish revenue commissioner and privy councillor in 1701. Had issue.
  - Catherine Keightley was the daughter of Rt. Hon. Thomas Keightley and Lady Frances Hyde. She married Lucius O'Brien and had issue.

== Character ==
Her husband in his memoirs wrote of his wife in somewhat guarded terms, but their surviving letters suggest that it was a close and affectionate marriage, strong enough to survive a four-year separation during the English Civil War. His unusually intimate friendship with Anne Villiers, Countess of Morton (a cousin of his first wife, Anne Ayliffe), never seems to have posed a threat to the happiness of his second marriage, and in any case, this friendship ended in a bitter quarrel some time before Lady Morton's death in 1654.

Frances's death after a short illness was undoubtedly a great blow to her husband, at a time when he was fighting desperately to stave off the threat of impeachment. In his will of 1666, he refers to Frances as "my dearly beloved wife who hath accompanied and assisted me in all my distress with greater resignation and courage and in all respects deserved much more from me than I can repay to her".

Another tribute to her character came from the diplomat Henry Coventry, who was then engaged in the peace negotiations at Breda, and wrote that the news of Frances's serious illness made him "very unfit for the business". On hearing of her death, he wrote to Clarendon, "I do from the bottom of my heart condole with you."

== Burial ==
Frances died at the age of 49 and was buried in the Hyde Vault in Westminster Abbey. The register of 1661 records: "Frances, daughter and sole heiress of Sir Thomas Aylesbury, Bart., by Anne his wife, and second wife of Sir Edward Hyde, first Earl of Clarendon." Her husband survived another 13 years before being buried with her. Her mother Anne Denman is also buried in the Hyde vault.

== In fiction ==
She appears as a character in The Piccadilly Plot, the seventh of the Thomas Chaloner mystery novels by Susanna Gregory.

She is mentioned in The King's Evil by Andrew Taylor, published by HarperCollins in 2019.
