= Aylesbury (disambiguation) =

Aylesbury is the county town of Buckinghamshire, England.

Aylesbury may also refer to:

== People ==
- Aylesbury Baronets
  - Sir Thomas Aylesbury, 1st Baronet (1576–1657), English civil servant
- Thomas Aylesbury (theologian) (fl. 1622–1659), theologian
- William Aylesbury (1612–1656), English translator
- Eadgyth of Aylesbury (7th century), Catholic saint from Anglo-Saxon England

== Aylesbury, Buckinghamshire ==
- Aylesbury (HM Prison)
- Aylesbury (UK Parliament constituency)
- Aylesbury and Buckingham Railway
- Aylesbury College
- Aylesbury F.C.
- Aylesbury High Street railway station
- Aylesbury Hundred
- Aylesbury railway station
- Aylesbury Rural District
- Aylesbury United F.C.
- Aylesbury Urban Area
- Aylesbury Vale
- Aylesbury Vale Parkway railway station
- Battle of Aylesbury
- Municipal Borough of Aylesbury

== Other uses ==
- Aylesbury, Saskatchewan, Canada
- Aylesbury, New Zealand
- Aylesbury Estate, Walworth, South London, England
- Aylesbury duck, a breed of domesticated duck bred in Aylesbury
- Aylesbury, Massachusetts, a fictional town created by H. P. Lovecraft

== See also ==
- Aylesby, England
