= Thomas Aylesbury =

Thomas Aylesbury may refer to:

- Sir Thomas Aylesbury, 1st Baronet (1576–1657), English civil servant
- Thomas Aylesbury (MP) (died 1418), English politician
- Thomas Aylesbury (theologian) (fl. 1622–1659), English theologian
