= Anne Denman =

Anne Denman (1587 – 1661) was born in Olde Hall, Retford, Nottinghamshire. Through a second marriage with Thomas Aylesbury, she became the grandmother of Lady Anne Hyde, Duchess of York and great-grandmother of Queen Mary II and Queen Anne.

== Early life ==
Anne was born in Olde Hall, West Retford in around 1587. She was the younger daughter of Francis Denman of Retford and Anne (Blount) Denman. Francis (born c. 1531, died 1599) was the rector of West Retford, Notts from 1578. He was the second son of Anne Hercy by her first husband, Nicholas Denman esq of East Retford, Notts. Francis had several sons who pre-deceased him and left two daughters as his heirs: Barbara (born c. 1583) who married Edward Darell (born c. 1582); and Anne.

Anne's nephew, Dr John Darrell, was the youngest child of Barbara Denman and Edward Darell, and inherited substantial properties from both the Denman and Darell families. In 1665 just before his death he made a will dividing his estate between three charities. He donated the childhood home of Anne and Barbara, Olde Hall, to create a hospital for elderly men (an alms house), which became the site for Trinity Hospital, Retford (a Grade II listed building).

== Marriages ==
Anne was married at 20 and left a widow at 23 after the death of her first husband William, the younger son of Sir Thomas Darell. William was the half-brother of her sister Barbara's husband Edward.

Anne left Retford due to some unknown trouble, or loss of fortune, in 1610 and proceeded to London by waggon-coach. Wilmshurst (1908) records that there had been a lawsuit between the two sisters in 1605.

After reaching London, Anne is said to have halted at a hostel called the 'Goat and Compasses', where she rested before looking out for an occupation suitable for a country lady of good birth and family. The owner (not the landlord) of the hostel was Mr Thomas Aylesbury, a rich brewer of the Parish of St Andrew's, Holborn who happened to be making an inspection of his 'Houses' and required a housekeeper for his household, engaging Anne to this position. Thomas was a widower of 34, and a year later made Anne an offer of marriage.

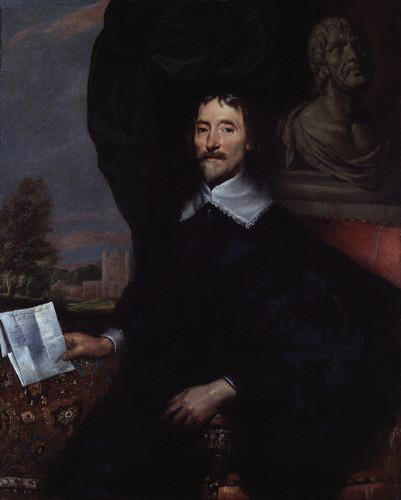
Thomas Aylesbury, Anne Denman's husband, c 1642

The marriage of Anne and Thomas was recorded in the Bishop of London's Registry, dated 3 October 1611, giving the couple's address as St Andrew's, Holborn. The registry notes that the marriage has 'the consent of his father, William Aylesbury, Esquire'. She is described in the register as 'Anne Darell, of the City of London, widow, whose husband died a year before'. Edwin Wilmshurst (1908) notes that Anne's first husband, William Darrel is described as 'of London', and apparently died there. He says this suggests Anne 'may have become acquainted with Mr Thomas Aylesbury before she became so young a widow and he a widower'. He also comments that on 17 April 1611, there was a partition of Estate between Edward Darrel and Barbara his wife, and her sister Anne, by an Indenture. This took place while she was working for Thomas Aylesbury but before she married him.

Marrying Thomas was fortunate for Anne, as in 1627, he was created a Baronet, Master of the Mint, and Master of the Requests, by Charles I. After the King's death, the family moved to Antwerp with other Royalists. During this time in exile, Barbara, Anne's daughter died. Lady Anne Hyde, Duchess of York, and granddaughter of Anne Denman, later noted in her pocket book that her aunt Barbara died in Antwerp in 1652 and unmarried. 'My dear Aunt Bab was, when she died, 24 years of age.' Barbara, when in exile in Holland, was attached to the then Princess of Orange, as a lady in waiting at the Hague.

=== Children ===
The issue of Anne Denman's marriage with Thomas Aylesbury were:

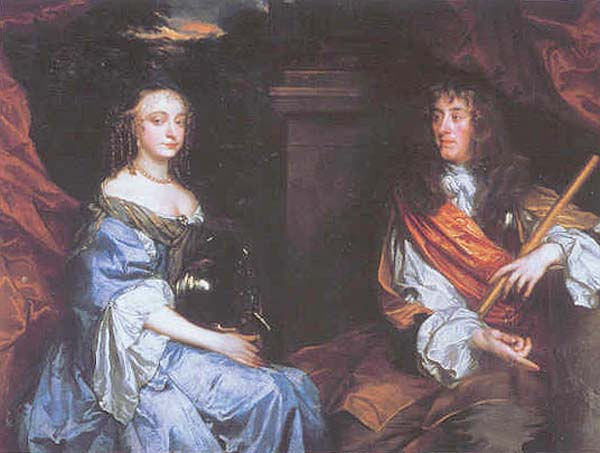
Portrait of Anne Denman's granddaughter Anne Hyde and her husband James II

- William baptised in 1612 at St Margaret's Lothbury in London, died in Jamaica in 1656
- Thomas (probably died young)
- Frances born 1617 died 1667, married Edward Hyde in 1634, had issue
  - Lady Anne (1637–1671), married King James II/VII
  - Hon. Henry, later 2nd Earl of Clarendon (1638–1709)
  - Hon. Laurence, later 1st Earl of Rochester (1641–1711)
  - Hon. Edward, (born c 1645, died 1665) buried 13 January 1665 having died at age 19 while a student at Oxford
  - Hon. James drowned in HMS Gloucester in 1682 in the suite of the Duke of York
  - Lady Frances, married Thomas Keightley, Irish revenue commissioner and privy councillor in 1675.
- Anne, baptised at St Margaret's and married there in 1637 to John Brigham
- Jane (probably died young)
- Barbara baptised at St Margaret's, Westminster, 9 May 1627 died 1652 in Antwerp, no issue.

Through her daughter Frances, Anne Denman is the maternal grandmother of Anne Hyde, the first wife of James II, and is the maternal great-grandmother of Mary II of England and Queen Anne.

== Sir Thomas' death and will ==
In 1657, Sir Thomas died in exile in Breda, aged 81. Anne returned to London. Sir Thomas's will was in favour of Anne and her daughter Frances, but was disputed. Fortunately, Anne had the help of the eminent lawyer Edward Hyde (b. 18 February 1608/9 d. 1674) who was married to her daughter Frances. The deaths of Frances' brothers and sisters meant that by the time of her father's death she was the heiress for her father's estate.

== Edward Hyde ==
Edward Hyde was Anne's son-in-law. The Registers of Westminster Abbey show that he married Frances, daughter of Sir Thomas Aylesbury and his wife Anne, at the Church of St Margaret's, Westminster (in which Parish Sir Thomas and Anne were resident), on 10 July 1634, under a Licence from the Dean and Chapter of Westminster, issued the same day. He was said to be 26 years of age having been born in the ninth year of King Charles' reign (1609), and was already a widower. He married his first wife Anne in 1629, and she died about six months later after catching smallpox. His second wife, Frances was about 21 upon her marriage.

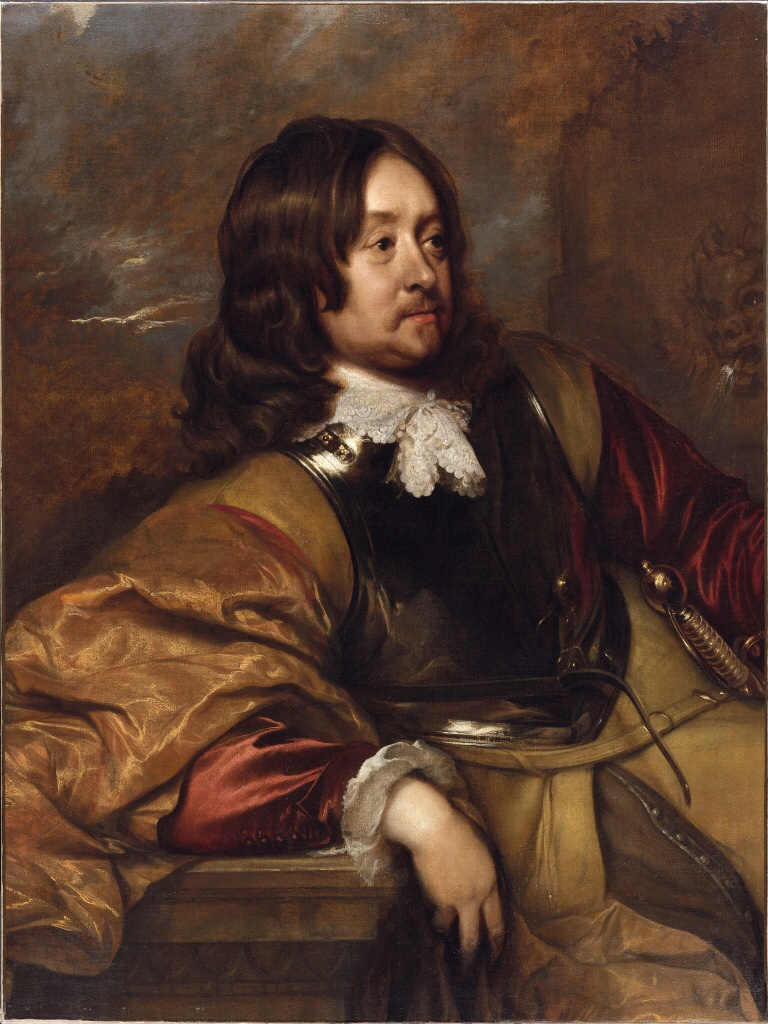
Edward Hyde, Earl of Clarendon

Edward Hyde had risen rapidly in his profession. When King Charles was at Oxford, he was knighted on 22 February 1642–3, and was then made Lord Chancellor and Privy Councillor at the age of 34. Upon King Charles' death, he had to flee from Puritan vengeance. He was with King Charles II in exile in Flanders, and in Bruges on 29 January 1657–58, he was again appointed Lord Chancellor in prospectu. With the restitution of the monarchy, Edward and Frances Hyde were now in high favour. For his long service to the King, and his fidelity to the Crown, Edward was created Baron Hyde of Hindon, Wiltshire in 1660. In 1661, he was raised to be Viscount Cornberry (in which year Frances died). He was later created Earl of Clarendon (1662), taking his title from the Estate and Park of Clarendon, near Salisbury.

Edward and Frances had six children. Their daughter Lady Anne (1637–1671), married King James II/VII.

== Death and burial ==
Anne Denman is interred in the Hyde family vault in Westminster Abbey. She seems to have secured the regard of her grandson-in-law, James, Duke of York, as Samuel Pepys notes in his Diary that, in 1661, The Duke of York was in mourning for his wife's grandmother, who (he adds) was thought of with a great deal of fondness — and which grandmother was Anne Denman, of the Old Manor House, West Retford, Notts, now the Trinity Hospital.

== Queen Anne portrait ==
Anne Denman's childhood home, the Old Hall in Retford, was given by her nephew John Darrell in his will to become a hospital for old men of good repute. As the last member of the Denman-Darrell family, he carried out the wishes of his father, Edward, in this respect. The Old Hall became Trinity Hospital, on Hospital Road, Retford. It is administered by a Trust which owns considerable property around Retford. A portrait of Queen Anne in Trinity Hospital was recently attributed (1999) by the auctioneers Phillips to Sir Godfrey Kneller. John was the nephew of Anne Denman, the first cousin of Frances Hyde, and therefore a cousin twice removed of Queen Anne.
