= Alsbury =

Alsbury is a surname. Notable people with the surname include:

- A. Thomas Alsbury (1904–1990), mayor of Vancouver, British Columbia from 1959 to 1962
- Juana Navarro Alsbury (1812–1888), nurse for Jim Bowie at the Battle of the Alamo in 1836
- Michael Alsbury (1975–2014), American commercial astronaut

See also Aylesbury (disambiguation)
