= Trinity Hospital Retford =

Grade II listed building in Retford

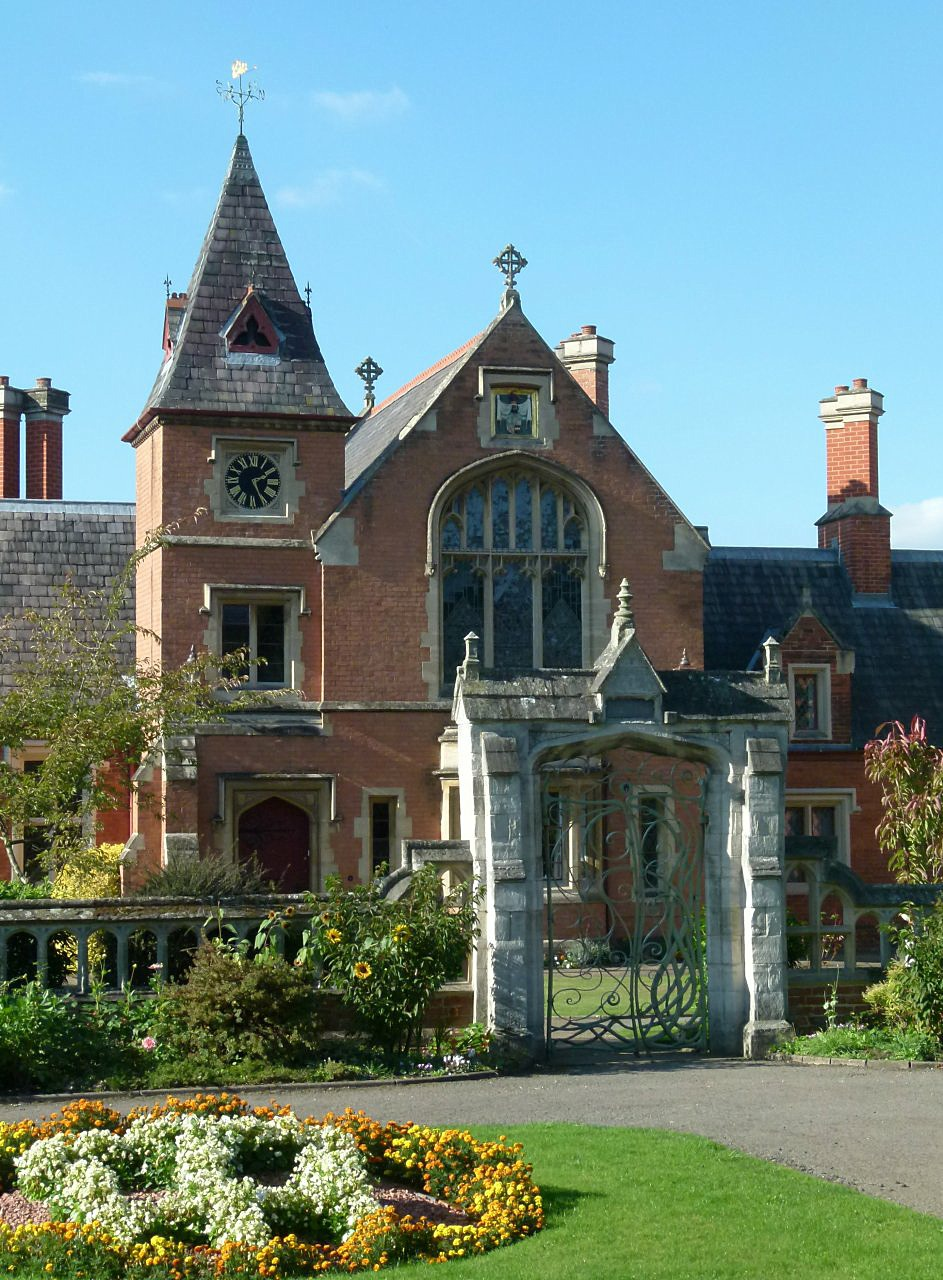
Main entrance to Trinity Hospital

Holy Trinity Hospital (known as Trinity Hospital) is a Grade II listed building in Retford, Nottinghamshire set in gardens off Hospital Road. It was established over 340 years ago, and has been a prominent Alms House since the 17th Century.

== The Old Hall and Founding of Trinity Hospital ==
The site of Trinity Hospital was originally the site of the Old Hall of West Retford, the home of the Denmans and Darrells of Retford, who were related by marriage to the Hercy's of Grove, Nottinghamshire who lived at Grove Hall.

According to Edwin Wilmshurst (1908), the Denmans were descended from Thomas Denman, a "knighted family" who held land at Tinslow (now Tinsley, near Sheffield) which he had inherited from William of Tynneslow. His descendant, Nicholas of Retforde married Ann, seventh daughter of Humphrey Hercy of Grove (and sister of Sir John Hercy), who inherited the Manor of West Retford. Nicholas and Anne Denman (née Hercy) had four sons: William (died 1568) without issue; Francis (d 1599) father of Barbara Denman (b 1582/3) and Anne Denman (b 1586); Thomas of Ordsall who had issue and who was the grandfather of the separatist Humphrey Denman; Edmund, of Hollywell, Co. Lincoln who died in 1561 without issue.

The Old Hall in Retford was given by Dr John Darrell (d 1665), son of Barbara Denman and Edward Darell (born c. 1582), to become a hospital for old men of good repute in his will (dated 1664). As the last member of the Denman-Darrell family, he carried out the wishes of his father, Edward, in this respect. He endowed it for a master and sixteen brethren.

In 1672 the Trustees carried out the instructions in the will to provide a separate suite of rooms for each brother and ten shillings per week. They would be given a gown of broad cloth every two years and coals valued at four pounds yearly. On 14 June 1672 they formulated a corporation with a seal of silver which in Wilmshurst's time was still in use. As well as a code of rules and regulations, appointing the Master Governor to be the Sub-Dean of Lincoln Cathedral; a Bailyffe who was to govern the hospital, receive the rents and be paid 20 nobles per year; the Chaplain to be the Rector of West Retford church (St Michael's); a nurse, who was to be a "Grave Ancient Woman".

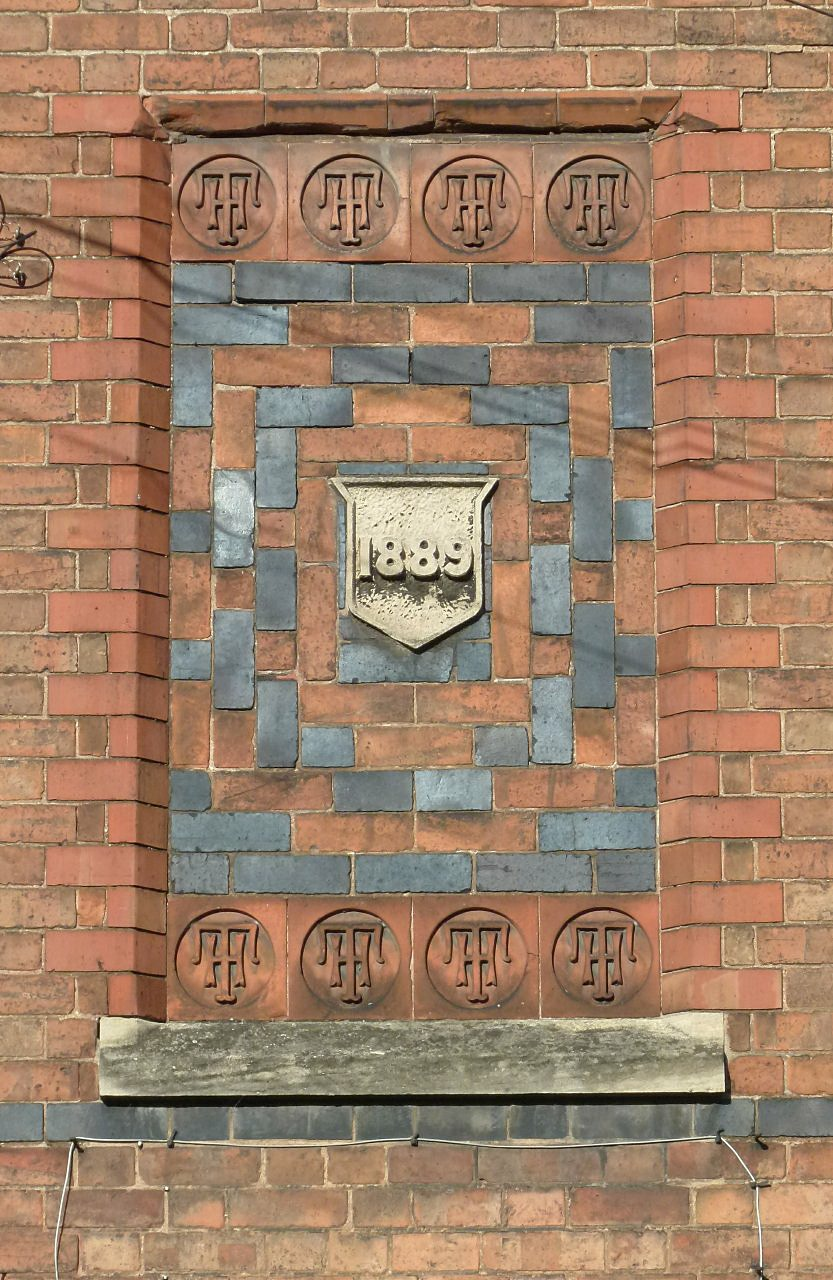
Decorative terracotta tiles showing Trinity Hospital logo

The Brethren had to be members of the Church of England and follow a series of rules:

- they were to be 'Poor Bachelors or Widowers of good Character, who are not less than 50 years of age’
- they should be selected from the neighbourhood of Retford and the kindred of John Darrell be preferred
- they must receive the sacrament at least three times a year, and to go to Church whenever there is service there
- they were to dine together at the Trinity Feast in the common room
- they must not be a drunkard, swearer or blasphemer or an obstinate refuser to go to Church or they would be expelled

The trust continues to this day. It was endowed with significant properties, the income from which was to provide for the costs of the hospital. This has resulted in many properties in the neighbourhood having been built by or under the auspices of the charity with rentals still providing the charity with its income. Most of these properties carry the distinctive TH monogram either in stonework or terracotta panels, and also use a distinctive maroon paint.

The will also founded a scholarship for young men to attend Exeter College in Oxford, and this is supported by a specific building with residences to let.

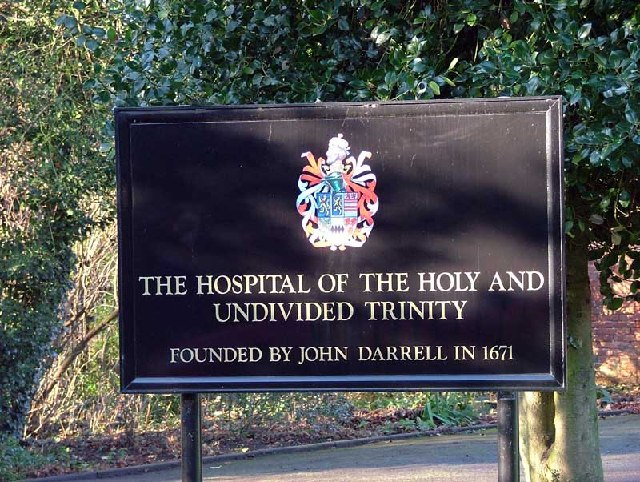
Sign outside Trinity Hospital showing coat of arms

== The current building ==
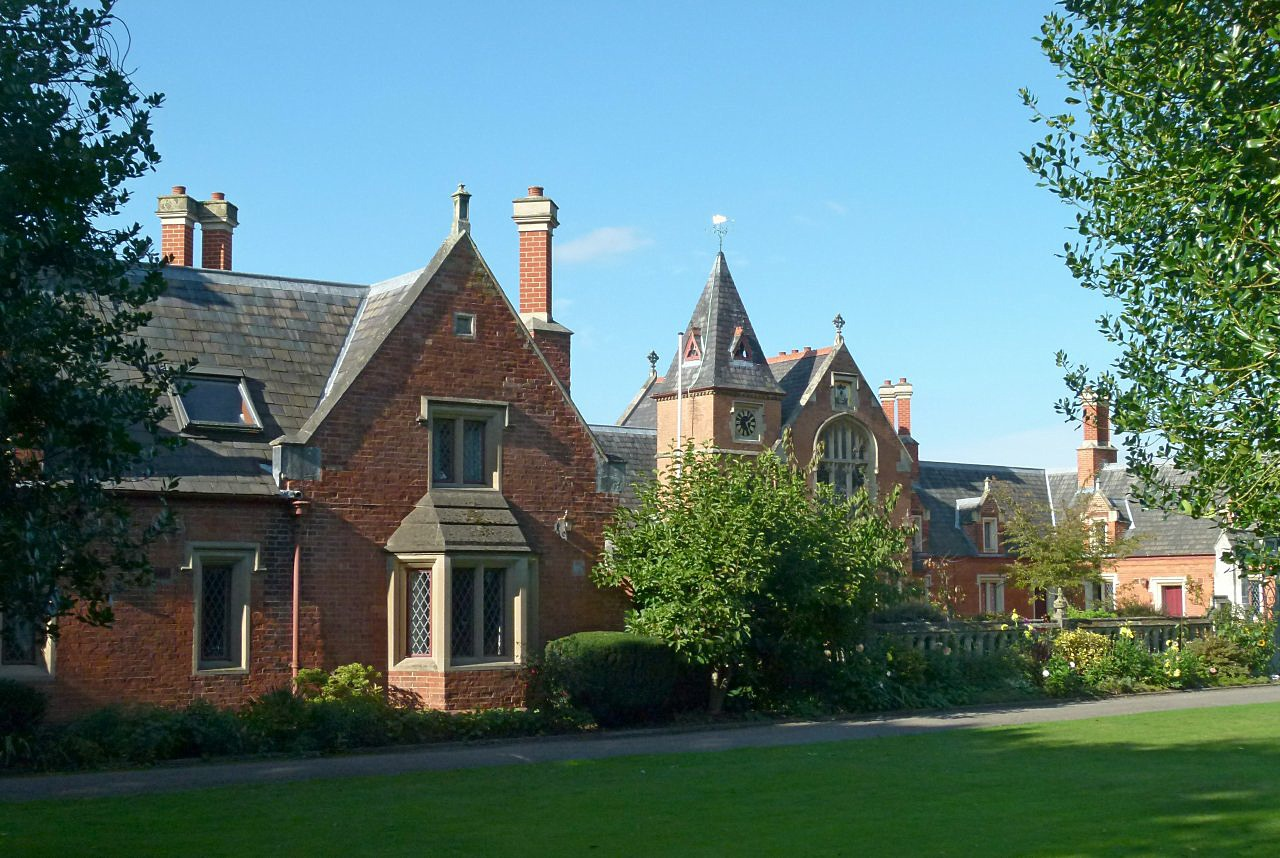
Southern Aspect of Trinity Hospital

By the early 19th century, the old Elizabethan building was in poor condition, and in 1832-4 the present (Grade II listed) Hospital was built on the original site to the design of Edward Blore. It is thought Blore's link to Retford was because his wife was from Mattersey. His creation cost £4,000 to build.

In 1872, Louth (Lincolnshire) architect James Fowler (who had earlier worked on West Retford Church) was commissioned to design a new chapel and audit room. This was added to the centre of the building and at the ground floor, reusing the former common room and converting the space into a chapel. He also added the clock tower.

The Clock Tower

The clock was made by William Thomas of Lincoln and is dated 1858. The clock is of bird-cage wrought iron construction, having two trains, a recoil escapement and shows the time externally on a single adjacent dial. It strikes the hours only on a single bell above. In 1996 an automatic winding system was installed on the advice of John Ablott of Scunthorpe.

The Audit Room

The Audit Room features a striking stained glass window made by Edwin Wilmshurst (the same Edwin Wilmshurst who wrote the history of Trinity Hospital).

In his scrapbook he notes how in 1860 he happened to be in York and enquired if he could obtain historic stained glass. He was shown a box of waste glass and bought it. When he retired in 1908, he finally cleaned and sorted it, discovering some came from church windows, some from noble town houses in medieval York and some from secular public buildings. It ranged in date from early Gothic to Nineteenth Century. He assembled from this collection a window which became known as the 'Trinity window'. It was installed by William Spurr, Plumber and Glazier of Churchgate, Retford at a cost of £20 – 6s – 7½d. When the window was restored in 2000, it was discovered that it contained rare medieval glass, which necessitated recording the window in the European and British Register.

Another stained glass window on the south-east side dates from 1876 and was added at the expense of brother Edward Beckett, who had been a gardener who laid out the grounds of the King Edward VI Grammar School and the Girls' High School. He is said to have saved his beer money for three years to pay for the window and have challenged his Brethren: "Now then you, there's t'other winder, and there be 15 o'yah; I dares ye to put him in." His Brethren took up the challenge and within a year had saved enough for the Four Evangelists window.

Ornamental gates

The Hospital features an outstanding pair of gates, commissioned in January 1995 by the Master Governor from Chris Topp, Blacksmith, of Carlton Husthwaite, Thirsk, North Yorkshire. The gates were finished and hung on the Epiphany Feast 1996. The gate posts are thought to date back to the Old Hall.

2015 extension

In 2015 the building was designed by Soul Architects and built by TG Sowerby, with the Darrel Room extension winning "Best Small Commercial Building" in the East Midlands LABC Building Excellence Awards.

Queen Anne Portrait A painting of Queen Anne belonging to the hospital was cleaned and restored in 1999. An appraisal of the painting was made by an art expert from Phillips, who attributed it to Sir Godfrey Kneller, a well-known royal portrait painter during Queen Anne's reign.

== Other properties ==
Trinity Hospital Estates Charity owns a number of buildings in the Retford area. In the 17th century, these were said to make up a third of all Retford's properties. They include:

- The former Newcastle Arms - a Grade II listed Victorian coaching inn on Bridgegate which was previously owned by the Trust and sold in 1934. It was bought by the trust in 2015 and developed into six apartments and an Estates Office, opening again in 2018.

== News ==
- Trinity Hospital opened to the public for Retford Heritage Day in 2017.
- Trinity Hospital opened to the public for Retford Heritage day 2018

== See also ==
- Listed buildings in Retford

== Reference works ==
- The History of the Old Hall of the Manor of West Retford, Edwin Wilmshurst, 1908
- A Godly Inheritance: The History of the Hospital of the Holy and Undivided Trinity, West Retford and of the Denman Family, Jean M. Nicholson, 1 September 2010
