= Robert Janyns the Younger =

English gothic architect

Robert Janyns (fl. 1499–1506) was an English gothic architect, who was likely responsible for part of the design of the Henry VII Lady Chapel at Westminster Abbey. He also worked at Windsor Castle, Burford church, and Richmond Palace.
