= Henrietta Hyde, Countess of Rochester =

Anglo-Irish noblewoman

Countess of Rochester
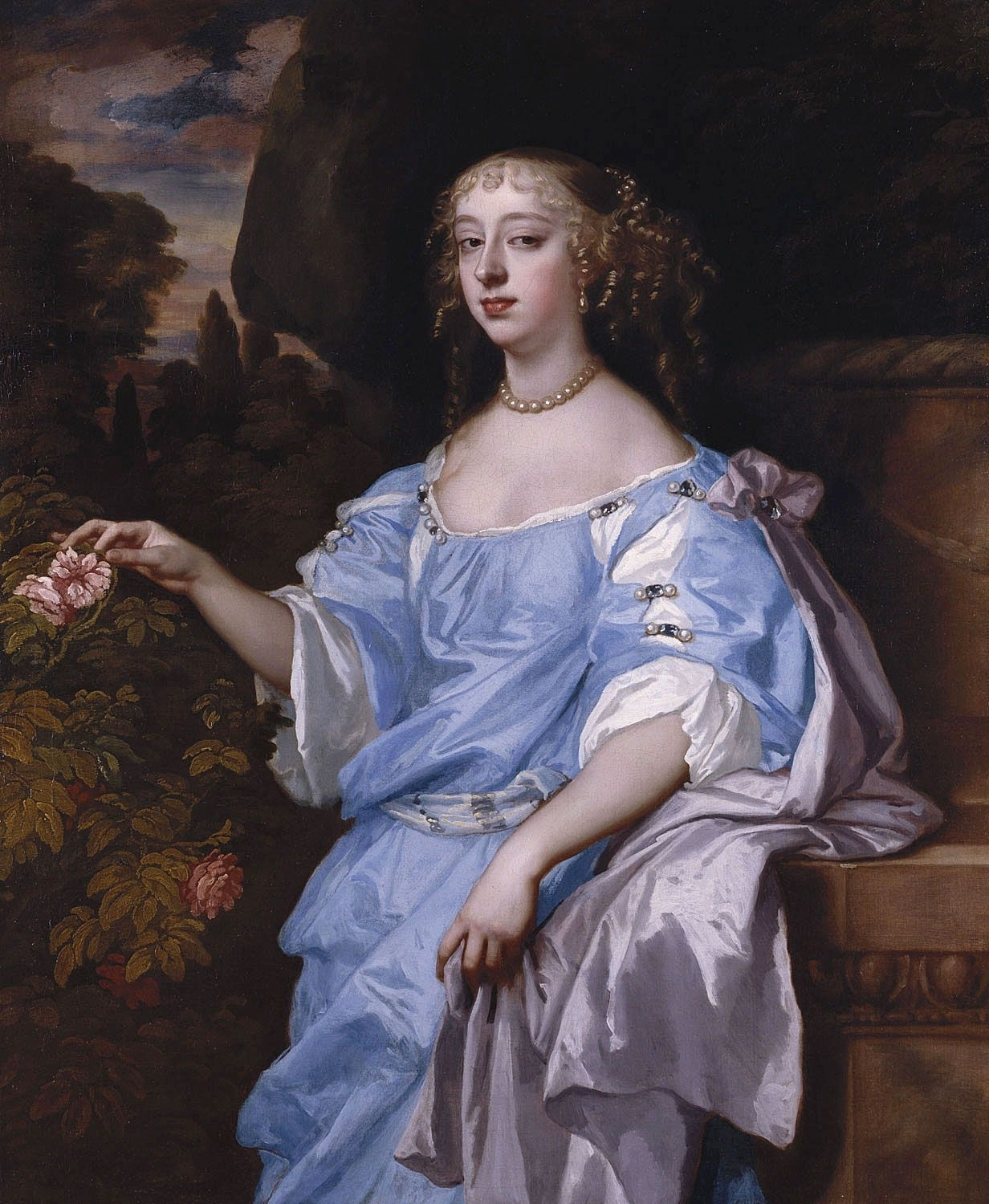
- Henrietta Boyle, Countess of Rochester, ca. 1665, by Sir Peter Lely
- Born: 1646
- Died: 12 April 1687 (aged 40–41)
- Spouse: Laurence Hyde, 1st Earl of Rochester
- Issue: 4, including Henry
- Father: Richard Boyle, 1st Earl of Burlington
- Mother: Elizabeth Boyle

Henrietta Hyde, Countess of Rochester (née Boyle; 1646 – 12 April 1687) was an Anglo-Irish noblewoman. She was one of the Windsor Beauties painted by Sir Peter Lely.

== Life ==
She was the youngest daughter of Sir Richard Boyle, 2nd Earl of Cork, and Elizabeth Boyle, Countess of Cork. Account to Philibert de Gramont, she was 'of a middle size, had a skin of a dazzling whiteness, fine hands, and a foot surprisingly beautiful, even in England. Long custom had given such a languishing tenderness to her looks, that she never opened her eyes but like a Chinese ; and, when she ogled, one would have thought she was doing something else'.

In 1665, she married Laurence Hyde, 1st Earl of Rochester, son of Edward Hyde, 1st Earl of Clarendon and Frances Aylesbury. It was a successful marriage, apparently only mired by Henrietta's brief dalliance with Henry Jermyn.

She was Groom of the Stole to her sister-in-law, the Duchess of York, for which she received a salary of £400. In November 1677, she was appointed to succeed Frances Villiers as the governess of the children of the Duke of York.

Like most of the Boyle dynasty, who in the space of two generations had become almost all-powerful in the south of Ireland, Henrietta was strong-minded and acquisitive, and could be ruthless in asserting her rights.

During the last two years of her life, when her husband was Chief Minister to his brother-in-law King James II, Henrietta took full advantage of his power to claim every possible privilege. She clashed bitterly with her husband's niece, the future Queen Anne, over who should have the best apartments in Whitehall Palace. Anne, who could herself be a formidable opponent, complained bitterly of her aunt's "peevishness" to her.

Following her death in April 1687, she was buried in Westminster Abbey.

== Children ==
- Lady Anne Hyde (died 25 January 1684/85), who married James Butler, 2nd Duke of Ormonde,
- Lady Mary Hyde, (1669–1709) who married Francis Seymour-Conway, 1st Baron Conway,
- Henry Hyde, 4th Earl of Clarendon (ca. 1672 – 10 December 1753),
- Lady Henrietta Hyde (ca. 1677 – 30 May 1730), who married James Scott, Earl of Dalkeith.

Anne and the younger Henrietta were both noted for their wit and charm. Anne's early death, following a miscarriage, was a great blow to her parents, her husband and all her friends. Her sister Lady Dalkeith, despite many personal tragedies, is said to have retained her good nature and charm into her fifties.

== Sources ==
- Gregg, Edward Queen Anne Yale University Press 2001
- Chester, Joseph Lemuel. The Marriage, Baptismal, and Burial Registers of the Collegiate Church or Abbey of St. Peter, Westminster. (p. 329) 1876. googlebooks Retrieved 6 June 2008
- "Henrietta, Countess of Rochester. (1833)", NYPL
