= Enrico Caterino Davila =

16th/17th-century Italian historian and diplomat

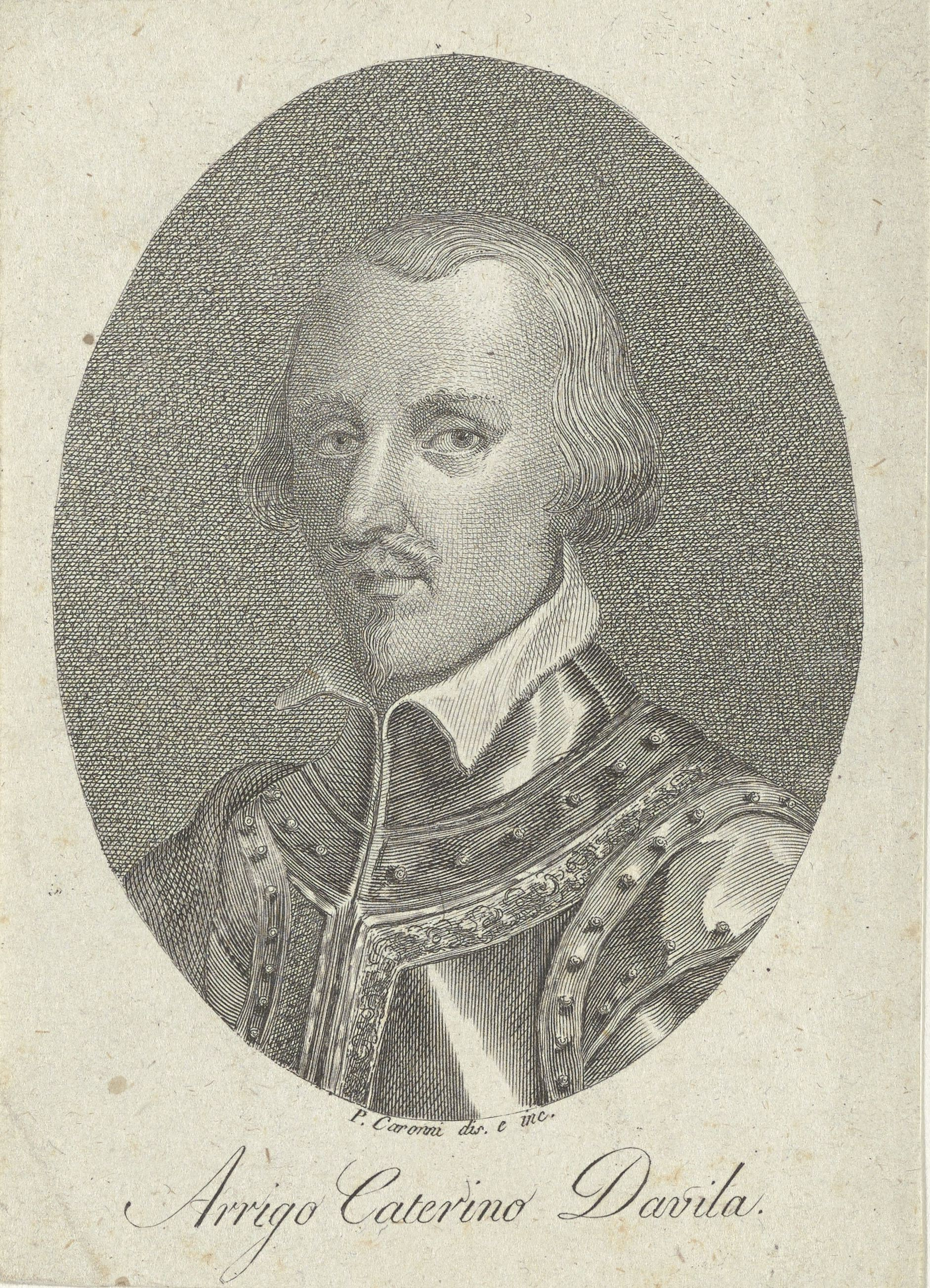
- Born: 30 October 1576; Piove di Sacco, Republic of Venice
- Died: 26 May 1631; San Michele Extra, Republic of Venice
- Occupations: Writer, historian
- Known for: Historia delle guerre civili di Francia (1630)
- Movement: Renaissance

Enrico Caterino Davila (30 October 1576 – 26 May 1631) was an Italian historian and diplomat.

== Life ==
Born in Piove di Sacco, near Padua, he was descended from a Spanish noble family and was the youngest son of Antonio Davila, Grand Constable of Cyprus. His name was given in honour of Henry III of France and Catherine de' Medici.

His immediate ancestors had been constables of the Kingdom of Cyprus for the Venetian republic since 1464. In 1570 the island was taken by the Turks; and Antonio Davila, the father of the historian, had to leave for Padua, despoiled of all his possessions. In 1583 Antonio took this son to France, where he became a page in the service of Catherine de' Medici, wife of King Henry II.

In due time he entered the military service and fought through the French civil wars until the peace in 1598. In 1599, he returned to Padua where he stayed until 1606. Subsequently, he travelled to Parma, Rome and Rovigo and finally settled to Tinos (1609–1615) where he held the post of governor. At Tinos he met and married his wife Ursula delli Ascuffi.

Later in his life Enrico was assigned as a governor of the Venetian possessions of Cattaro (1618–1621) and Zara (1623–1628). Also in 1621, he participated in a Venetian diplomatic mission to Florence, under the leadership of Alvise Valaresso.

Enrico Davila was murdered, while on his way to take possession of the government of Cremona for Venice in May 1631, by a ruffian, with whom a dispute arose about relays of horses ordered for his use by the Venetian government. Davila was killed by a pistol bullet; the murderer's aides also killed the family chaplain but the murderer was killed by Enrico's son 'Antonio' and the rest of the attackers were captured and then publicly executed in Verona.

== The Istoria ==
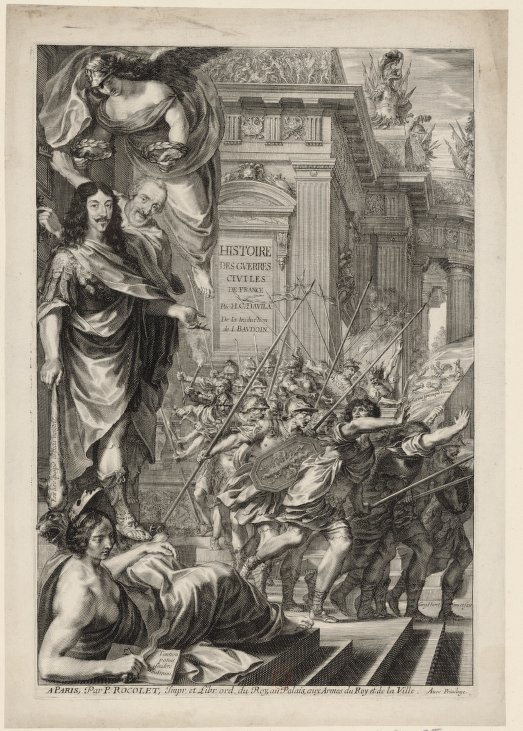
Title page of the French translation of Davila's History of the Civil Wars of France.

He planned a history of the civil wars in France in which he had taken part, and during which he had seen the leading personages and events. This work was completed about 1630 and was offered by the author to the publishers in Venice. At last Tommaso Baglioni, who had no work for his presses, undertook to print the manuscript, on condition that he should be free to leave off if more promising work offered itself. The printing of the Istoria delle guerre civili di Francia was, however, completed, and the success of the work was immediate.

The Historia delle guerre civili di Francia is based on first-hand knowledge of events and personalities. Sceptical about the religious claims of both sides (Catholic and Huguenot), Davila vividly portrayed the French wars of religion mainly as a struggle between noble factions for the control of the royal government and, within limits, is still a rich source of information for a troubled period of French history.

Over two hundred editions followed, of which perhaps the best is the one published in Paris in 1644. An English translation was made for Charles I of England by William Aylesbury and Charles Cotterell, published as The Historie of the Civil Warres of France (1647). Samuel Pepys was appreciative.

Lord Bolingbroke, in his fifth letter on the Study of History, recommends him very strongly as a writer equal in many respects to Livy. The American statesman and political thinker John Adams wrote his last work of political theory, the Discourses on Davila, as an extended commentary on Davila's history of the French civil wars, following the example of Machiavelli's Discorsi on Livy's history of Rome.

His name is often anglicised as Henry Catherine Davilla.

== Works ==
1. Theatro del Mondo (Unpublished, 1598–1599)
2. Enrico Caterino Davila (1644). Historia delle guerre civili di Francia. Vol. 1. Paris – via nella Stamperia reale.
3. Enrico Caterino Davila (1644). Historia delle guerre civili di Francia. Vol. 2. Paris – via nella Stamperia reale.

== Sources ==
- Kitromilides, P., Κυπριακή Λογιοσύνη: 1571-1878 (Nicosia, 2002)
- Benzoni, Gino (1987). "DAVILA, Enrico Caterino". Dizionario Biografico degli Italiani (in Italian). Vol. 33: D'Asaro–De Foresta. Rome: Institute of the Italian Encyclopaedia. ISBN 978-88-12-00032-6.
