= William Aylesbury =

English translator (1612–1656)

William Aylesbury (c. 1612 or c. 1615 – 24 August 1656) was an English translator and administrator.

== Personal life ==
William Aylesbury was born in about 1612 or 1615 to Sir Thomas Aylesbury, a wealthy brewer and royalist, and Anne Denman an heiress from Retford in Nottinghamshire. He was baptised in St Margaret Lothbury in London. William was the oldest of six siblings: Thomas (probably died young); Frances (1617–1661) who married Edward Hyde; Anne, baptised at St Margaret's and married there in 1637 to John Brigham; Jane (probably died young); and Barbara who was baptised at St Margaret's, Westminster, 9 May 1627 and died in 1652 in Antwerp without issue.

== Career ==
In 1628 he became a gentleman commoner at Christ Church, Oxford at the age of 16, and obtained his bachelor's degree in 1631, at the early age of 19 (Wood, Fasti Oxon. i. 460).

Although possessing a large fortune, Aylesbury became, at the invitation of Charles I, governor to the young Duke of Buckingham and his brother, Lord Francis Villiers, and travelled with them through France and Italy. In 1640 Aylesbury was residing in Paris, and in his correspondence with his brother-in-law, Sir Edward Hyde, which is preserved in the Bodleian Library among the Clarendon Papers, bitterly lamented the course of English politics under the Long Parliament. In the middle of May 1641 he returned from Paris to London with the Earl of Leicester, the English ambassador at the French court, with whom he had been apparently living for some months. Shortly afterwards he presented his former pupils to the king at Oxford, who promised him the next vacancy among the grooms of the chambers, but the promise was never fulfilled, and Aylesbury continued in the service of the Duke of Buckingham, as his agent, until the final defeat of the royalists.

During his interview with Charles I, the king urged Aylesbury, who was well acquainted with Italian, to continue a translation of Enrico Caterino Davila's History of the French Civil Wars which he had just begun, and during the following years he was mainly engaged with in this work. He was only in England at intervals, and witnessed his royal patron's disasters from the safe distance of Paris or Rome.

He and his friend, Sir Charles Cotterel, who materially aided him, received frequent encouragement from the king. In spite of his political troubles, Charles, in fact, read through the whole of the manuscript before the book was printed. The translation was published with a dedication to the king in 1647, and bore the title, The Historie of the Civil Warres of France, written in Italian by H. C. Davila. Translated out of the originall. London, 1647, fol.

On the fall of Charles I and the coming start of the Civil War, Aylesbury sought refuge with his father, first in Amsterdam, and afterwards in Antwerp. He also took under his protection his sister, Lady Hyde.

In 1650 he was forced to return to England, as the confiscation of his family's property left him without any means. He retired to the neighbourhood of Oxford and lived on the charity of his more fortunate friends.

Early in 1656, however, he obtained the office of secretary to Major-General Robert Sedgwick, who had just been appointed Governor of Jamaica, and finally left England. For a few months he took an active part in the government of the island, but he died on 24 August 1656. A letter conveying the news of his death to Secretary John Thurloe describes him as 'a man well versed in the weighty affairs of state, who in his counsels and advice, both to army and fleet, was very useful, for the want of which we shall have more and more to grieve.'

Aylesbury's translation of Davila was republished in 1678 with a preface by Sir Charles Cotterell, who there claimed for himself the execution of the greater part of the original version.
