= Charles Stuart, Duke of Kendal =

Charles Stuart
- Duke of Kendal
- Born: 4 July 1666; St James's Palace, London, England
- Died: 22 May 1667 (aged 10 months 18 days); St James's Palace, London, England
- Burial: 30 May 1667; Westminster Abbey
- House: Stuart
- Father: James, Duke of York
- Mother: Anne Hyde

Charles Stuart, Duke of Kendal (4 July 1666 – 22 May 1667) was the third son of James, Duke of York (later James II of England) and his first wife Anne Hyde.

Charles was born on 4 July 1666 at St James's Palace. His godparents were his three-year-old brother James, Duke of Cambridge, his cousin James, Duke of Monmouth, and Emilia von Nassau, Countess of Ossory. He was designated Duke of Kendal and was to have been created Duke of Kendal, Earl of Wigmore, and Baron of Holdenby, but no patent was ever enrolled. He died at St James's Palace at the age of 10 months on 22 May 1667 and was buried in Westminster Abbey on 30 May 1667.

== Arms ==
Arms of Charles Stuart, Duke of Kendal

Although he was only a grandson of a British Sovereign, by the time of his birth it had become obvious that his uncle would not have any children, so he received a coat of arms as if he were a son of the Sovereign. Said arms consisted of those of the kingdom, differenced by a label argent of three points, on each three torteaux gules.
