= James Stuart, Duke of Cambridge =

James Stuart
- Duke of Cambridge; Earl of Cambridge; Baron of Dauntsey
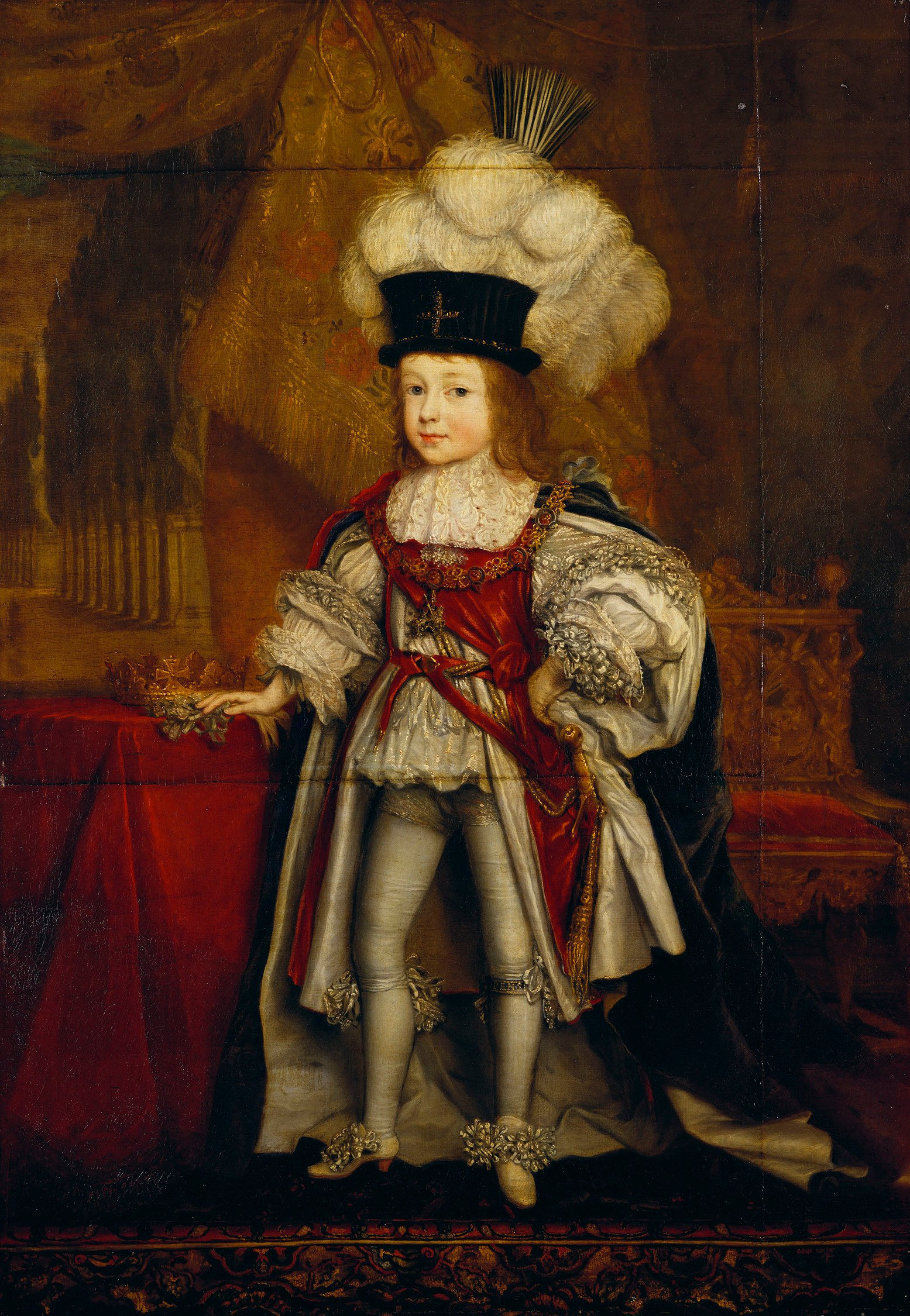
- Portrait by John Michael Wright, c. 1666–7. James is shown wearing the robes and top-hat of the Order of the Garter. This is the only portrait of James painted from life.
- Born: 12 July 1663; St James's Palace, London, England
- Died: 20 June 1667 (aged 3); Richmond Palace, Surrey, England
- Burial: 26 June 1667; Westminster Abbey
- House: Stuart
- Father: James, Duke of York
- Mother: Anne Hyde
- Religion: Anglicanism

James Stuart, Duke of Cambridge (12 July 1663 – 20 June 1667) was the second son of the Duke of York (later James II of England) and his first wife, Anne Hyde. In 1664, the infant James became the first Duke of Cambridge and Baron of Dauntsey, titles his uncle, King Charles II, created especially for him. The King also appointed Cambridge a Knight of the Garter, but never invested him due to his untimely death. Cambridge received a yearly pension of £3,000 from the king.

== Life ==
Cambridge was born at 1:22 a.m. on 12 July 1663, at St. James's Palace, the second but first surviving son and child of the Duke of York (later King James II of England) and his wife, Anne Hyde. He was a grandson of Charles I of England and great-grandson of Henry IV of France. His baptism took place at St. James's Palace on 22 July, and was performed by Gilbert Sheldon, Archbishop of Canterbury. His godparents were his uncle King Charles II and his maternal grandfather Edward Hyde, 1st Earl of Clarendon. Queen mother Henrietta Maria stood as godmother. Also present were Henry Jermyn, 1st Earl of St Albans and Edward Montagu, 1st Earl of Sandwich. James was held by Mary Fairfax, Duchess of Buckingham.

James was the great-grandson of King James VI of Scotland and I of England, the first Stuart king of England. During the English Civil War, his uncle King Charles II had escaped to France. Just three years prior to Cambridge's birth, he had been called back to England and thus, Cambridge was born as the nephew of the King. The Duke of York was a member of the Church of England during Cambridge's lifetime and all of his children were raised as Anglicans. Two years after Cambridge's death, York converted to Roman Catholicism.

On 23 August 1664, he was created Duke of Cambridge, Earl of Cambridge and Baron of Dauntsey by his uncle, the King. Of the four sons of the Duke of York who bore the title Duke of Cambridge, only two were ever formally created so: Cambridge and his brother Edgar. In 1665, a younger sister named Anne was born; she would ascend the throne one day. Anne was the only sister at whose birth Cambridge was still alive. In 1666, Cambridge was joined by a brother, the short-lived Duke of Kendal.

On 3 December 1666, Cambridge was appointed Knight of the Garter. After Charles II and some other Knights installed themselves at a round table in the King's private quarters, Cambridge was escorted into the King's presence by James Scott (Cambridge's 17-year-old illegitimate cousin; son of the king) and Edward Montagu. Afterwards, Cambridge kneeled before the King, who put the necklace of the Order on his neck and gave the sash of the Order to Prince Rupert of the Rhine. The King then kissed Cambridge and the ceremony was officially over. By this time it looked unlikely that his uncle would have any legitimate offspring from his barren wife, so Cambridge was already being treated as the heir to the throne after his father. In May 1665, King Charles II issued letters patent that granted Cambridge a yearly pension of £3,000. The money would not be controlled by Cambridge until his fourteenth year; until then the money was likely controlled by his parents or his nannies.

== Death ==
Cambridge became ill during late April 1667, probably on the 27th or 28th of the month. The disease was probably smallpox or bubonic plague, as an eyewitness account given by Samuel Pepys states that Cambridge was "full of spots" and that his physician, Dr. Frazier, did not know how to treat this disease. On 22 May, the Duke of Kendal, who was also sick from convulsions, died at St. James's Palace and Cambridge was transferred to Richmond. His mother feared for his life after Kendal died, because he was very sick. Another entry in Pepys's diary stated that the royal family lost all hopes of his survival during June 1667. An entry dated 6 June 1667, Pepys wrote that the nation lost all hopes of Cambridge surviving. However, an entry date 9 June stated that Cambridge was recovering pretty well and was expected to survive.

His death on 20 June came as a shock to the nation, who saw it as the doom of the House of Stuart, as the Duke of York was left with no male issue. He lay in state in the Palace of Westminster before his funeral, nearly a week after his death, on 26 June, 1667. He was interred in Westminster Abbey. His tomb reads (in Latin): "Deposit of the Most Illustrious Prince James Duke of Cambridge & second-born son and Heir of the Most Powerful Prince James Duke of York who in the Queen's Hall of Richmond fell asleep on the twentieth day in his fourth year, AD 1667."

== Aftermath ==
Pepys wrote that during Cambridge's illness, the English were very concerned of what would happen in the event of his death and disappointed that he did die. The King did not send a formal letter instructing the court to mourn, and there was no mourning period.

The titles Duke of Cambridge and Baron of Dauntsey became extinct upon James's death, the former revived several times since and the latter revived just once for James's brother Edgar in 1667.

A portrait of Cambridge painted by Willem Wissing, commissioned by his sister Lady Mary, the future Mary II, used to hang above the door of the Queen's Drawing Room of the Garden House at Windsor Castle. Cambridge's pension continued to be issued to his father, in hopes of supporting his other children.

== Honours ==
- KG (Knight of the Garter): 3 December 1666 (only appointed, but never invested)

== Arms ==
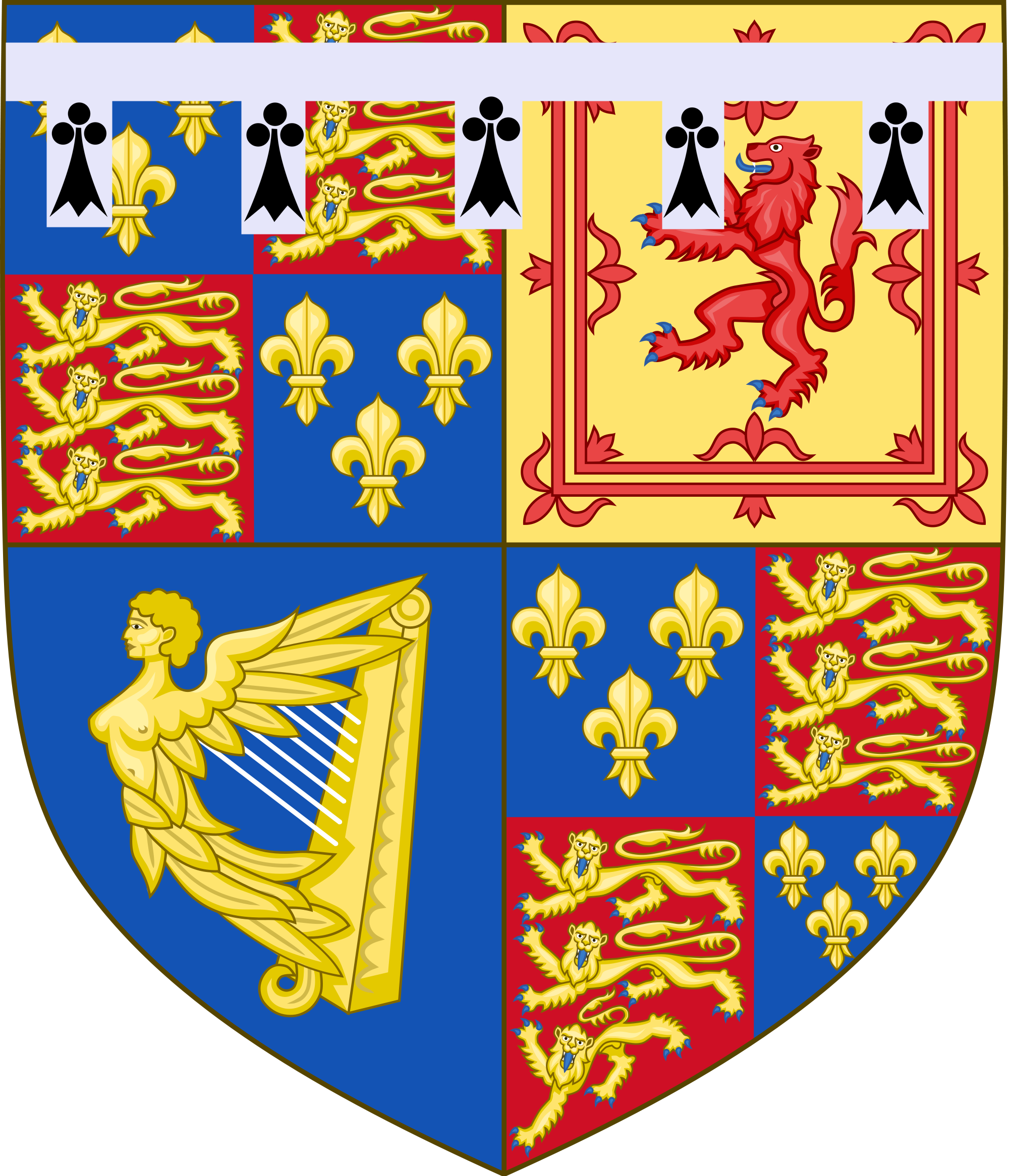
Coat of arms as Duke of Cambridge

James bore a coat of arms, as a grandson of a British Sovereign, consisting of those of the kingdom, differenced by a label argent of five points ermine.

== Notes ==
James Stuart House of Stuart Born: 12 July 1663 Died: 20 June 1667
Peerage of England
New title	Duke of Cambridge; 1664–1667	Vacant Title next held by Edgar Stuart
Vacant Title last held by Prince Henry	Earl of Cambridge; 1664–1667	Vacant Title next held by Edgar Stuart
