= Henry VII Chapel =

Chapel to Mary in Westminster Abbey

Coordinates: 51.4993°N 0.1266°W

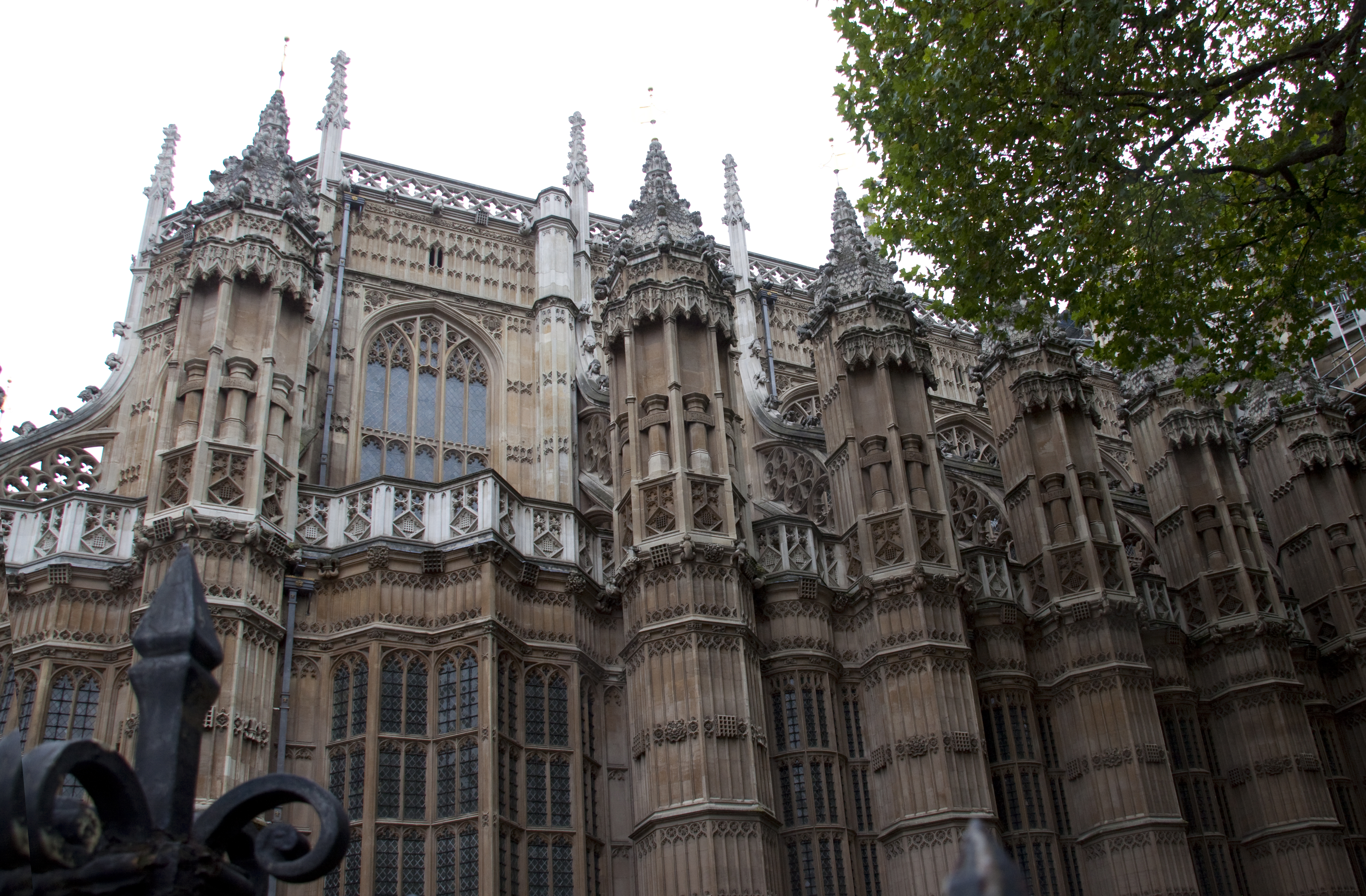
Henry VII Chapel

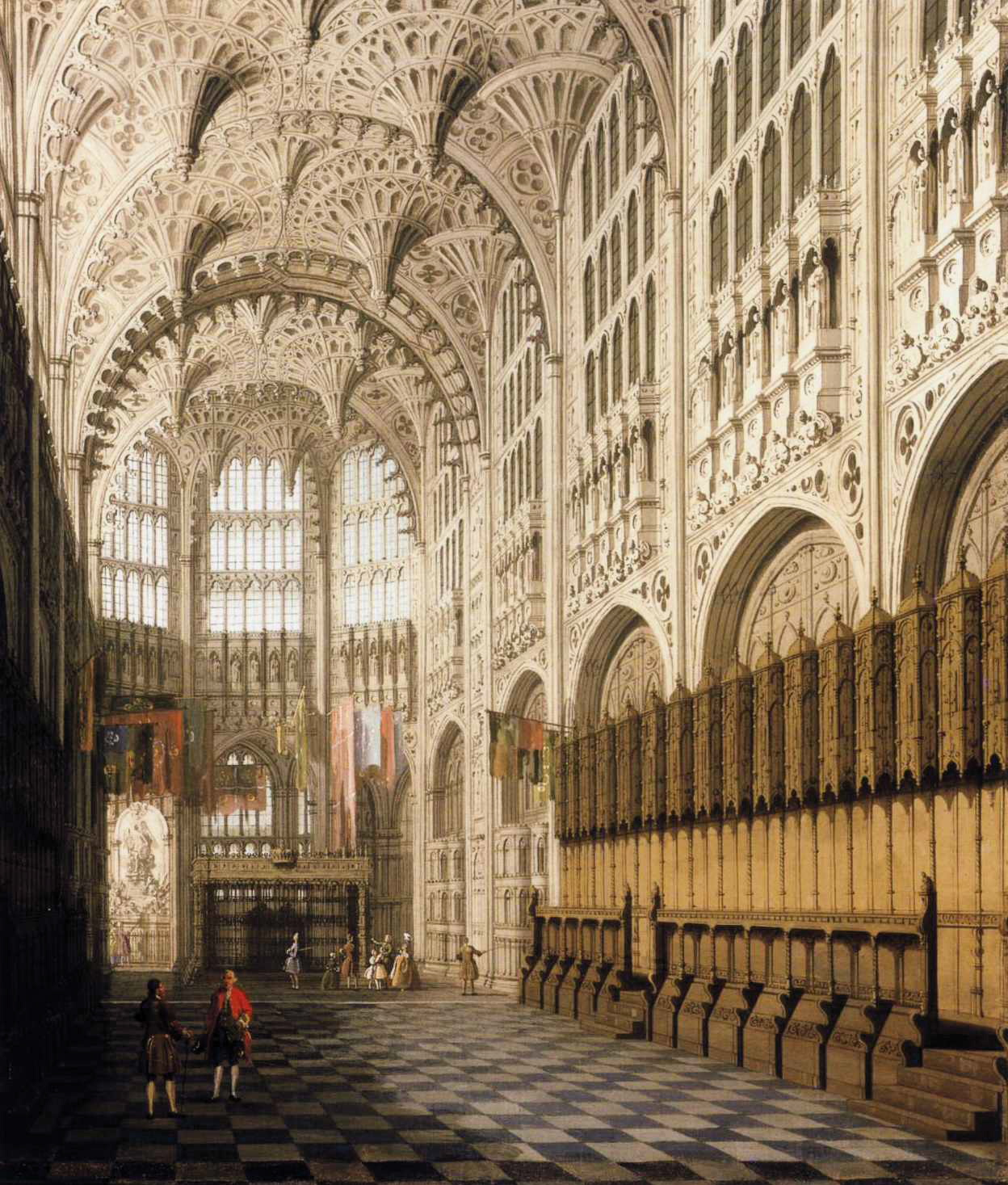
Painting of the chapel by Canaletto

The Henry VII Lady Chapel, now more often known just as the Henry VII Chapel, is a large Lady chapel at the far eastern end of Westminster Abbey, England, paid for by the will of King Henry VII. It is separated from the rest of the abbey by brass gates and a flight of stairs.

The structure of the chapel is a three-aisled nave composed of four bays, leading to an apse, which contains the altar, and behind that the tombs of Henry VII and his wife Elizabeth of York as well as of James I. There are five apsidal chapels.

The chapel is noted for its pendant fan vault ceiling.

The chapel is built in a very late Perpendicular Gothic style, the magnificence of which caused John Leland to call it the orbis miraculum (the wonder of the world). The tombs of several monarchs, including Henry VII, Edward VI, Mary I, Elizabeth I, James I, Charles II, and Mary, Queen of Scots, are found in the chapel.

The chapel has also been the mother church of the Order of the Bath since 1725, and the banners of members hang above the stalls.

== History ==
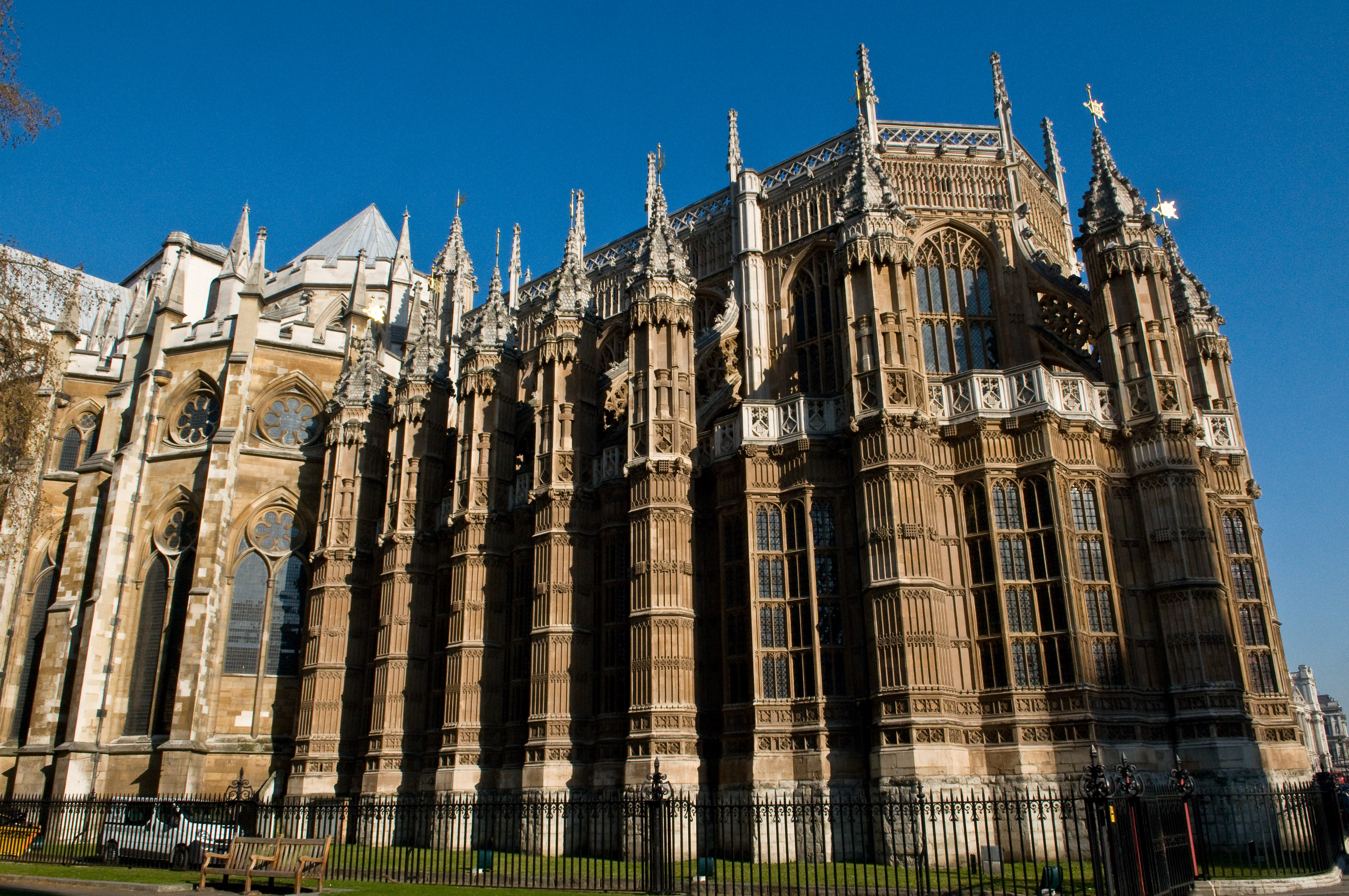
Exterior of the chapel

In the 13th century, a movement toward devotion to the Virgin Mary inspired the building of chapels in her honour across Europe. Henry III’s Lady Chapel at Westminster Abbey was part of this trend. In 1502, Henry VII planned a new chapel. The old one was demolished in 1502 and construction of the new foundation began January 24, 1503.

Henry VII had three goals when planning his chapel. The first was to build a shrine to honour and hold the body of Henry VI, who was expected to be canonized. Ultimately, canonization did not occur and Henry VII and his wife, Elizabeth of York, were interred in the tomb intended for Henry VI. Second, Henry VII wished to dedicate a more elaborate chapel to the Virgin to replace the older, simpler structure; and third, he wanted a royal mausoleum for him, his family, and his heirs at an important religious site that would enhance his legitimacy as king and his legacy.

Henry VII allocated more than £14,000 for its construction between 1503 and 1509. In his will, he stipulated that more funds were to be provided as needed. The final cost of the chapel is estimated at £20,000. According to Francis Bacon, “He lieth at Westminster in one of the stateliest and daintiest monuments of Europe…So that he dwelleth more richly dead in the monument of his tomb than he did alive at Richmond or in any of his palaces.”

In the eighteenth century, one observer commented that “[t]his chapel, it has been said, was designed as a sepulchre in which none but such as were of the royal-blood should ever be interred; accordingly the will of the founder has been so far observed, that all that have hitherto been admitted are of the highest quality, and can trace their descent from some or other of our ancient kings.” In the intervening years, some people not of aristocratic descent, including Oliver Cromwell, were buried there, but during the Restoration of the monarchy many of those people were disinterred.

== Pendant fan vault ==
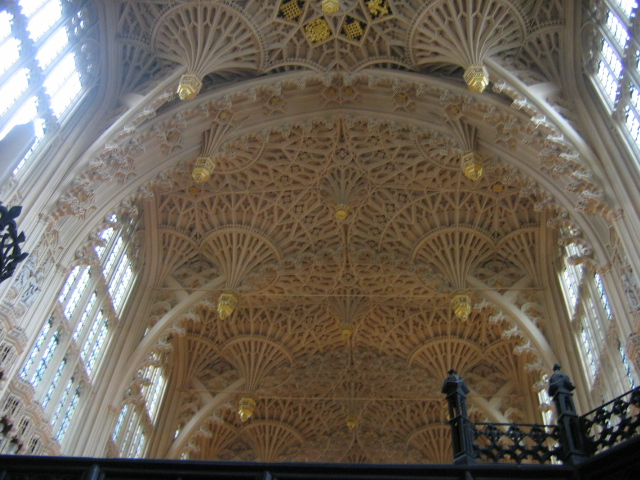
Pendant fan vault of Henry VII's chapel at Westminster Abbey

The Henry VII Chapel is best known for its combination of pendant fan vault ceiling. Andrew Reynolds refers to the vault as “the most perfect example of a pendant fan vault, the most ambitious kind of vaulting current in the perpendicular period.” Notably, this ceiling was also the first to combine pendants with fan vaulting.

The fan vault is created by first dividing the ceiling into groin vaulted compartments. These groin vaults are created by the combination of arches along the wall and larger, transverse arches bridging the nave of the chapel. In the fan vault at the Henry VII Chapel, the compartments are nearly square in shape. The compartments are then ribbed and paneled. Ribs, of the same curve and size, are cut from single pieces of stone and rebated so to best fit with the panels. The curved ribs, extending from the same point on the wall, are spaced equidistant from each other, forming conoid shapes. The resulting conoids, however, require great compressive forces to keep shape.

Spandrels usually provide pressure along the upper edge of the conoids. In the Henry VII Chapel, these spandrels are replaced with hanging pendants. The pendants still provide the compression necessary to support the conoids and add complexity to the aesthetics of the room.

The pendants serve an additional structural purpose. The pendants are cut from single stones and inserted as wedge stones in the transverse arches. By combining with the transverse arches, the pendants do not require additional structural support.

At the time of the construction of the chapel, pendant vaults were very new; they were first seen in the Divinity School at Oxford.

== Other architectural features ==
The chapel's architect is unknown, but it is believed that Robert Janyns the Younger was responsible for the design of much of the structure. The structure of the chapel is a three-aisled nave composed of four bays. The aisles are divided by rows of mahogany stalls into the North, South, and Central aisles. All contain numerous monuments and floor stones dedicated to various nobles. Above the stalls, at the triforium level, are many sculptures. Interspersed between the sculptures are the heraldic banners of the Knights of the Order of the Bath. Above this is the clerestory, with three rows of smaller windows. The window tracery articulates four larger windows, one in each bay, each composed of these three rows of smaller lancet windows. As much of the original glass was destroyed during the English Commonwealth, the East Window, over the centre apsidal chapel, as well as the Donor Windows (in the west), in the chapels themselves, are new additions, installed in 2000 and 1995, respectively. The latter is the west window which depicts royal coats of arms, and was designed by John Lawson and made by Goddard & Gibbs. In 2013, two new stained glass windows designed by Hughie O'Donoghue were installed on either side of the East Window.

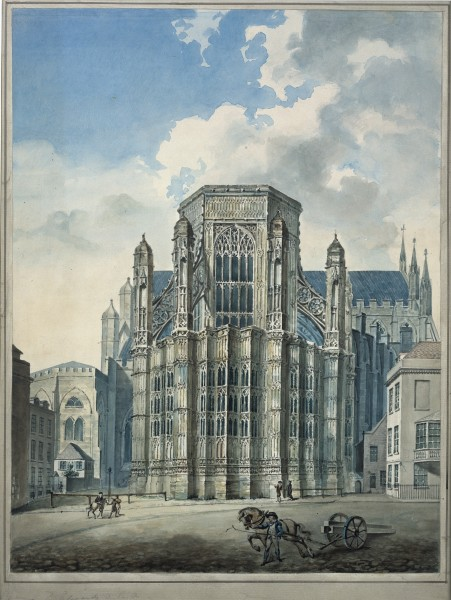
View from Old Palace Yard, in pencil and watercolour. Edward Edwards c. 1780s

The apse of the chapel contains the altar, and behind that, the tombs of Henry VII and his wife as well as of James I. There are five apsidal chapels. These chapels originally contained altars—they were screened off and intended for private prayer for members of the royal family—but their dedication is no longer known.

Upon entering the chapel, one passes through a set of bronze gates, which are elaborately crafted and "illustrate the ... intense determination of Henry VII to put to the forefront every possible indication of his claims to the crown of England." The gates are decorated with numerous royal crests that serve to legitimise his rule. Once inside, the mahogany stalls stand out to the viewer as they contrast with the light colored stone of the walls and ceiling. The stalls also contribute the verticality of the interior. They date from different times; while some are original others were added later to accommodate the increasing number of Knights of the Order of the Bath. The stalls were designated for all living Knights of the Most Honourable Order of the Bath. When a knight was installed, he received a stall that was subsequently adorned with his crest, coat of arms, and heraldic banner, the last of which remained in the chapel even after the knight's death. These banners all remain to decorate the chapel. During the nineteenth century, there were too many knights to accommodate in the chapel and no more were installed until the twentieth century. Currently, only the most senior knights are assigned stalls in the chapel.

The altar and Henry VII's tomb were crafted by the same Italian artist, Pietro Torrigiano. The Henry VII tomb was created first, beginning in 1512. The tomb was sculpted by a Florentine Renaissance artist, thus, the style is atypical of English art. The putti on the corners are particularly uncharacteristic. The altar was begun in 1517, but Torrigiano left the country before it was completed; Benedetto da Rovezzano finished its construction in 1526. Originally made of terracotta, white marble, and gilt bronze, it was destroyed during the Commonwealth. The current altar is based on images of the original. Two surviving pillars and two newly constructed ones support the reconstructed altar. Also significant are the aforementioned sculptures that adorn the triforium. The statues are of saints and the Apostles. According to Lindley, that "Henry VII's will declares his trust in ... 'Aungels, Archaungels, Patriarchs, Prophets, Apostels, Evangelists, Martirs, Confessours and Virgyns'" is critical to understanding his motivation in building the chapel: "Henry's belief in the efficacy of 'mediacions and prayers' in his progress through purgatory is crucial to his purpose." That is to say, he built the chapel and adorned it with numerous sculptures of important religious figures in part to ensure his acceptance into Heaven.

=== RAF Chapel ===
At the far eastern end is the RAF Chapel, dedicated to the men of the Royal Air Force and allied forces who died in the Battle of Britain between July and October 1940, who are also commemorated by a stained glass window The chapel preserves a small hole in its wall caused by a German bomb exploding outside during an air raid in 1941. The RAF Chapel was the original burial site of Oliver Cromwell in 1658. Cromwell was disinterred in 1661, after the Stuart Restoration, when his body was hanged in chains on the gallows at Tyburn.

== People buried in the Henry VII Lady Chapel ==
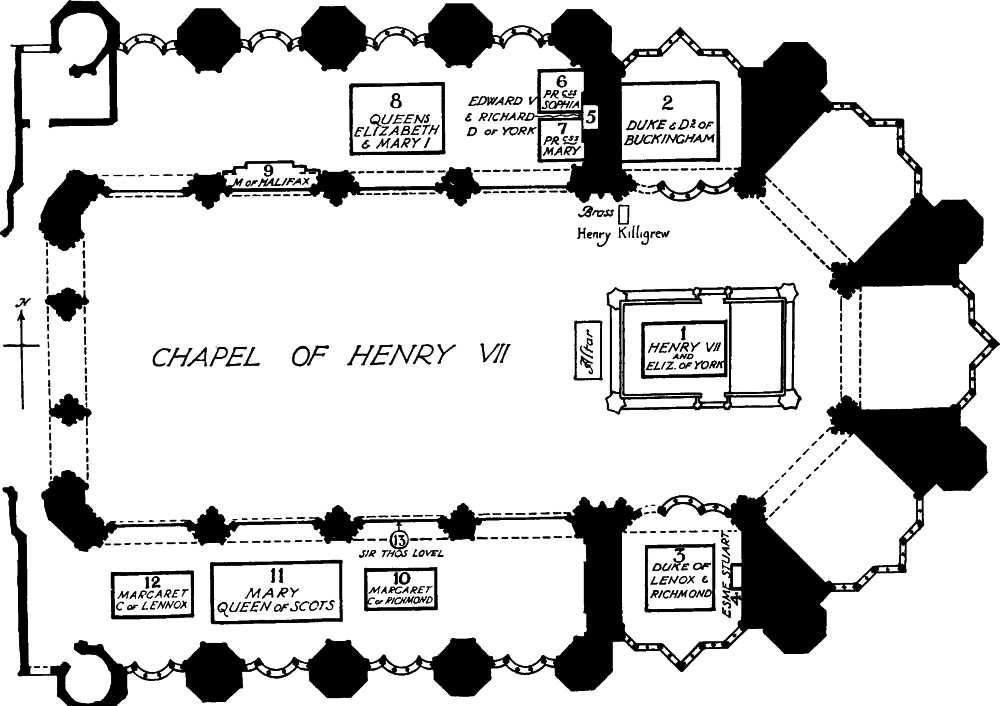
1924 Plan of tombs in Lady Chapel in Westminster Abbey

- Princess Amelia of Great Britain
- Anne, Queen of Great Britain
- Anne of Denmark, Queen of Scotland and England
- Anne, Duchess of York and Albany
- Anne de Mowbray, Duchess of York and Norfolk
- Antoine Philippe, Duke of Montpensier
- Arthur Penrhyn Stanley
- Augusta, Princess of Wales
- Caroline of Ansbach, Queen of Great Britain
- Princess Caroline of Great Britain
- Catherine of Valois, Queen of England
- Charles II of England
- Edward V (presumed, identity not confirmed; also thought possibly to be buried at St George's Chapel, Windsor Castle)
- Edward VI
- Prince Edward, Duke of York and Albany
- Elizabeth I
- Princess Elizabeth of Great Britain
- Elizabeth of York, Queen of England
- Elizabeth Cavendish, Countess of Devonshire
- Esmé Stewart, 2nd Duke of Richmond
- Frances Stewart, Duchess of Lennox
- Frederick, Prince of Wales
- Prince Frederick of Great Britain
- George II of Great Britain
- George Monck, 1st Duke of Albemarle
- George Villiers, 1st Duke of Buckingham
- George Villiers, 2nd Duke of Buckingham
- Prince George William of Great Britain
- Henry VII of England
- Prince Henry, Duke of Cumberland and Strathearn
- James VI and I
- James Butler, 1st Duke of Ormonde
- James Hamilton, 6th Earl of Abercorn
- James Hamilton, 7th Earl of Abercorn
- John Sheffield, 1st Duke of Buckingham and Normanby
- Katherine Villiers, Duchess of Buckingham
- Princess Louisa of Great Britain
- Ludovic Stewart, 2nd Duke of Lennox and 1st Duke of Richmond
- Margaret Beaufort, Countess of Richmond and Derby
- Margaret Douglas, Countess of Lennox
- Marie Joséphine, Countess of Provence (transferred to Cagliari Cathedral in 1811)
- Mary I of England
- Mary II
- Mary, Queen of Scots
- Oliver Cromwell (disinterred in 1661, after the Stuart Restoration of the monarchy)
- Richard of Shrewsbury, Duke of York (presumed, identity not confirmed; also thought possibly to be buried at St George's Chapel, Windsor Castle)
- William III of England
- Prince William, Duke of Cumberland
- Prince William, Duke of Gloucester

== See also ==
- Artists of the Tudor Court
