= Laurence Hyde, 1st Earl of Rochester =

English statesman and writer (1642–1711)

The Right Honourable The Earl of Rochester KG PC
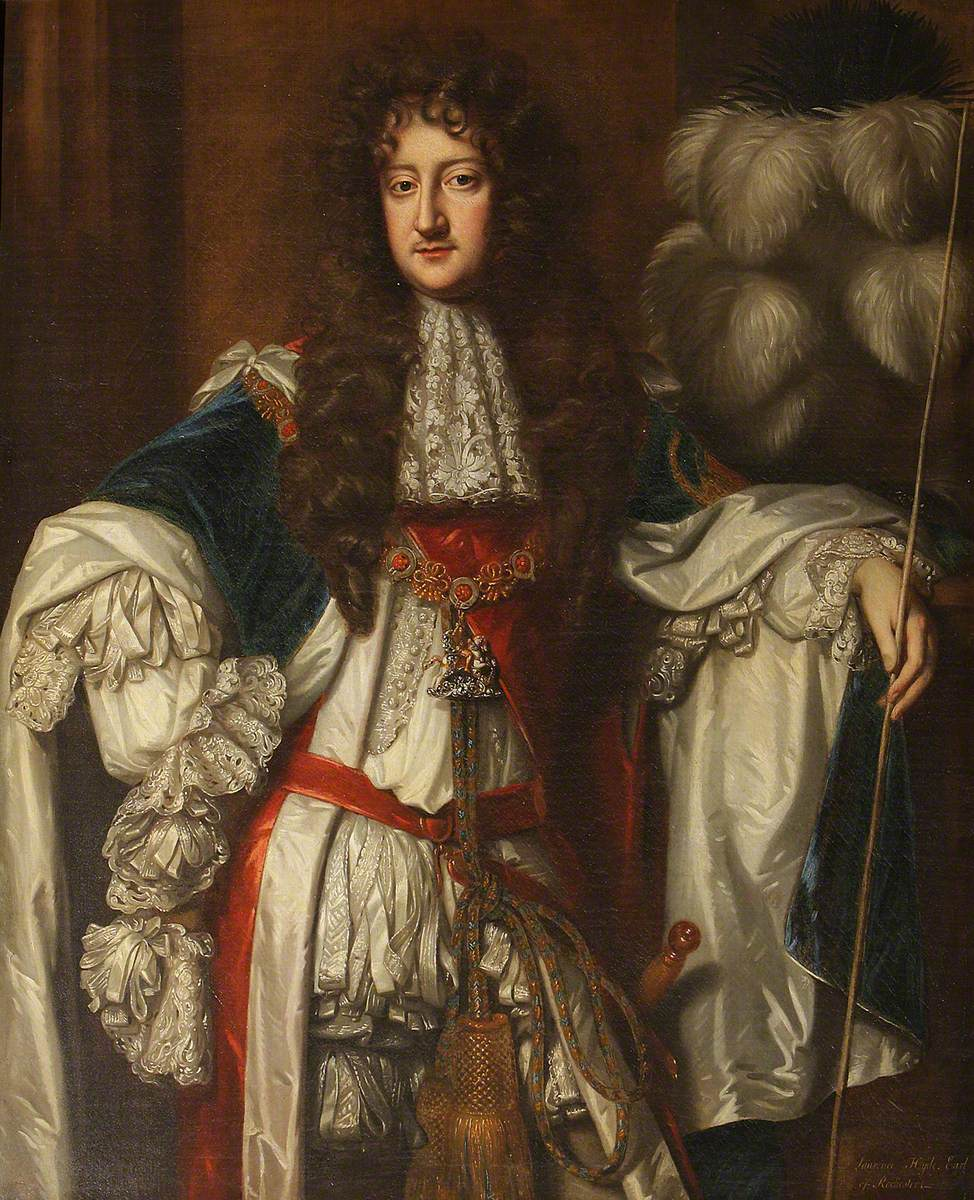
- Portrait by Willem Wissing, c. 1685

Chief Minister of Great Britain First Lord of the Treasury
- In office 1679–1684
- Monarch: Charles II
- Preceded by: The Earl of Essex
- Succeeded by: The Lord Godolphin

Lord President of the Council
- In office 24 August 1684 – 18 February 1685
- Monarchs: Charles II; James II
- Preceded by: The Earl of Radnor
- Succeeded by: The Marquess of Halifax
- In office 21 September 1710 – 13 June 1711
- Monarch: Anne
- Preceded by: Lord Somers
- Succeeded by: The Duke of Buckingham and Normanby

Chief Minister of Great Britain Lord High Treasurer
- In office 1685–1686
- Monarch: James II
- Preceded by: The Lord Godolphin as Lord High Treasurer Commission
- Succeeded by: The Lord Belasyse as Lord High Treasurer Commission

Lord Lieutenant of Ireland
- In office 1700–1703
- Monarchs: William III; Anne
- Preceded by: Lords Justices
- Succeeded by: The Duke of Ormonde

Personal details
- Born: March 1642 England
- Died: 2 May 1711 (aged 69) London, England
- Resting place: Westminster Abbey
- Party: Tory
- Spouse: Lady Henrietta Boyle
- Children: 4, including Henry Hyde
- Parent(s): Edward Hyde, 1st Earl of Clarendon; Frances Aylesbury

Laurence Hyde, 1st Earl of Rochester, KG, PC (March 1642 – 2 May 1711) was an English statesman and writer. He was originally a supporter of James II but later supported the Glorious Revolution in 1688. He held high office under Queen Anne, daughter of his sister Anne Hyde (first wife of the future James II of England), but their frequent disagreements limited his influence.

== Early life ==
Hyde was the second son of Edward Hyde, 1st Earl of Clarendon, and his second wife, Frances Aylesbury. He was baptized at St Margaret's, Westminster, on 15 March 1642.

He was admitted to the Middle Temple on 30 May 1660, but was not called to the Bar. He graduated M.A. at Oxford on 4 February 1661. Following the Restoration, he sat as member of parliament, first for Newport, Cornwall, and later for the University of Oxford, from 1660 to 1679.

In 1661, he was sent on a complimentary embassy to Louis XIV of France, while he held the court post of Master of the Robes from 1662 to 1675.

== Early career ==
Having returned to England, he entered the new parliament, which met early in 1679, as member for Wootton Bassett; in November 1679 he was appointed First Lord of the Treasury, and for a few years, he was the principal adviser of Charles II. Hyde was an opponent of the Exclusion Bill that would have prevented James, Duke of York, from acceding to the throne.

He was created Earl of Rochester, Viscount Hyde of Kenilworth, and Baron Wotton Basset on 29 November 1682. Compelled to join in arranging the treaty of 1681, by which Louis XIV agreed to pay a subsidy to Charles, he was simultaneously imploring William, Prince of Orange, to save Europe from the ambitions of the French monarch.

Rochester's enemy Lord Halifax called for an inquiry into Rochester's stewardship of the finances and it was found that £40,000 had been lost by mismanagement. As a consequence, Rochester was, in August 1684, removed from office and given the post Lord President of the Council, a more dignified but less lucrative and important office. Halifax said: "I have seen people kicked down stairs but my Lord Rochester is the first person that I ever saw kicked up stairs".

== Reign of James II ==
Although appointed Lord Lieutenant of Ireland, Rochester did not take up this position; he was still President of the Council when James II became king in February 1685, and he was at once appointed to the important office of Lord Treasurer but in spite of their family relationship and their long friendship, James and his Treasurer did not agree. The king wished to surround himself with Roman Catholic advisers; the Earl, on the other hand, looked with alarm at his master's leanings to that form of faith.

In 1686, James tried to convert Rochester to Catholicism; every audience Rochester had with the king was spent in arguments over the authority of the Church and the worship of images. Rochester had interviews with Catholic divines in order to appear open-minded but he refused to convert. The king agreed to a conference between Catholic and Protestant divines in a formal disputation. James allowed Rochester to choose any Anglican ministers except John Tillotson and Edward Stillingfleet. Rochester chose two chaplains who happened to be in waiting, Simon Patrick and William Jane. The conference was held in secret on 30 November at Whitehall and the divines discussed the real presence, with the Catholics taking on the burden of proof. Patrick and Jane said little, with Rochester defending the Anglican position. At one point Rochester lost his temper and angrily asked whether it was expected that he would convert on so frivolous grounds. He then composed himself, knowing how much he was risking, and complimented the divines and requested that he be given time to digest what was said. James knew now that Rochester did not intend to be convinced.

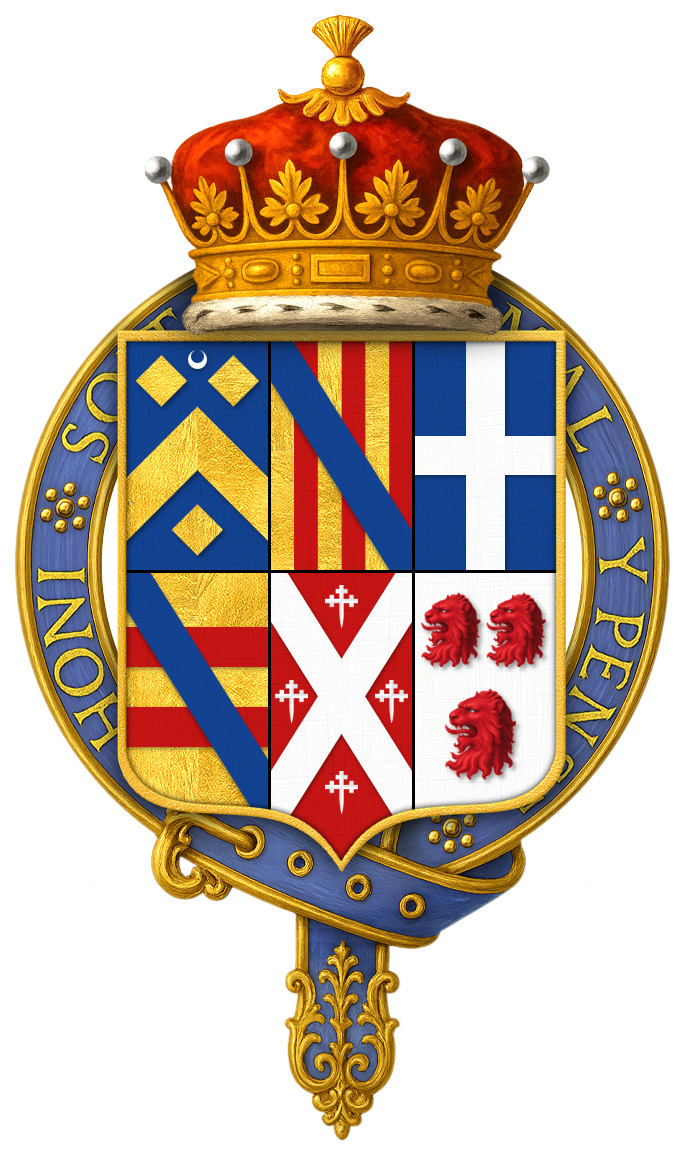
Quartered arms of Laurence Hyde, 1st Earl of Rochester, KG, PC

News of the conference leaked and Tory churchmen were shocked that Rochester might have wavered in his faith. Rochester requested another conference and James consented. Rochester let it be known to influential Catholics at court that he would do everything they requested (except convert) so long as he remained in office. He told them that as a Protestant he would prove more useful to them than as a Catholic. However, on 17 December James called Rochester into an audience and told him that so high an office of Lord Treasurer could not be held by a staunch Anglican under a Catholic monarch. James asked him to think again about his refusal to convert, but Rochester would not; and on 4 January 1687, he was dismissed. However, he received a pension of approximately £4000 per annum and £40,000 and estates from a convicted traitor.

In October 1687, James asked the Lord Lieutenants to provide three standard questions to all members of the Commission of the Peace: would they consent to the repeal of the Test Act and the penal laws; would they assist candidates who would do so; and would they accept the Declaration of Indulgence. As Lord Lieutenant of Hertfordshire, Rochester eagerly pursued this, but was told by the country squires that they would send no man to Parliament who would vote away the safeguards of the Protestant religion.

== Glorious Revolution ==
On 5 November 1688, William, Prince of Orange, landed at Torbay. Rochester was a leading voice for the calling of a free and legal Parliament and that negotiations should be opened with William. James replied to this petition that he wished for a free Parliament but would only call one after William had left England, declaring that so long as he was present a free Parliament was impossible as William could command nearly one hundred votes. At the council of Lords held by James, Rochester defended the petition and declared that he saw no hope for king and country except through a Parliament. He added that negotiations should be opened with William.

Rochester opposed the election of William and Mary as king and queen, raising his voice for the establishment of a regency on behalf of the exiled James. But he soon reconciled himself to the new order, perhaps because he could not retain his pension unless he took the oaths of allegiance. After this he was quickly in the royal favour and again a member of the Privy Council. He advised the queen in ecclesiastical matters, and returned to his former position as the leader of the High Church party. Rochester tried to mediate in the quarrel between Princess Anne and the King and Queen, but with little success. Anne, who could be a bitter enemy, thanked him for his expressions of goodwill but added sarcastically that she would have valued them much more if she thought that they had been sincere.

== Later life ==
From December 1700 until February 1703 he was Lord Lieutenant of Ireland, although he did not spend much time in that country. The widespread belief that he would be a key advisor to his niece Queen Anne was quickly shown to be an illusion: they had never been close, and Anne was resentful of anyone who attempted to bully her. Rochester, whose great weakness as a politician was his uncontrollable temper, could never resist a quarrel, in which he would often say something quite unforgivable, and after a series of such quarrels, the Queen dismissed him from office early in 1703.

The concluding years of his public life were mainly passed in championing the interests of the Church. In 1710 he was again made Lord President of the council, and in the final year of his life was generally seen as a mature and moderate statesman. He died on 2 May 1711 and was buried on 10 May 1711 at the foot of the steps leading up to the King Henry VII Chapel in Westminster Abbey. On his death, he was succeeded by his only son, Henry (1672–1753), who in 1724 inherited the earldom of Clarendon. When Henry died without issue on 10 December 1753, all his titles became extinct.

== Family ==
In 1665, he married Lady Henrietta Boyle (died 1687), daughter of Richard Boyle, 1st Earl of Burlington and Cork and Lady Elizabeth Clifford. They had four children:

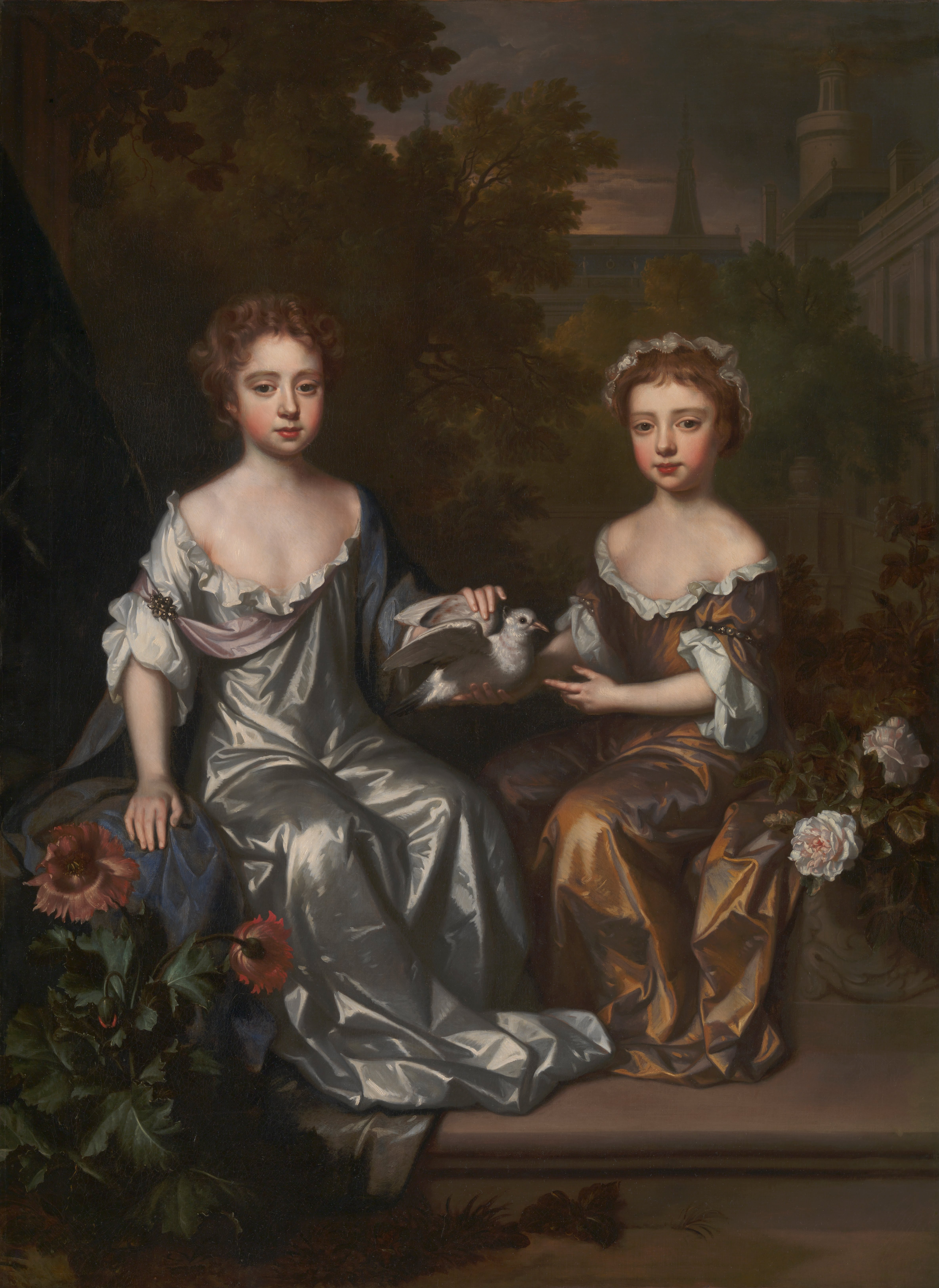
Lawrence's Daughters: Mary and Henrietta as children (by Willem Wissing)

- Henry Hyde, 4th Earl of Clarendon (1672–1753)
- Anne (died 1685), who married James, Earl of Ossory. In her will, she left property in White's Alley, Coleman Street, Beaconsfield, to be used to maintain her tomb and to benefit local widows and orphans.
- Mary (died 1709), who married Francis Seymour-Conway, 1st Baron Conway
- Henrietta (c.1677–1730), who married James Scott, Earl of Dalkeith.

Laurence was an affectionate father: Anne, Countess of Ossory, was his favourite child, and her early death in 1685 following a miscarriage was a blow from which some thought he never fully recovered. Anne was noted for wit and charm, as was her younger sister Henrietta, Countess of Dalkeith. John Evelyn called Henrietta "the wittiest of her sex"; other friends said that she retained the charm of youth even when she was well over fifty.

When his father was impeached in 1667, Laurence joined his elder brother, Henry Hyde, 2nd Earl of Clarendon, in defending him in Parliament, but the fall of Clarendon did not injuriously affect the fortunes of his sons. They were united with the royal family through the marriage of their sister, Anne, with the future King James II, making her Duchess of York.

In 1676, Laurence Hyde was sent as ambassador to Poland; he then travelled to Vienna, whence he proceeded to Nijmwegen to take part in the peace congress as one of the English representatives.

== Literature ==
Laurence Hyde had some learning and a share of his father's literary genius. The main employment of his old age was the preparation for the press of his father's History of the Rebellion, to which he wrote a preface in which he expounded his Tory philosophy. The work was dedicated to his niece Queen Anne: the Queen, whose poor eyesight made reading something of an ordeal, was not especially pleased, particularly since the preface could be interpreted as an attack on her own policies. She remarked drily that it was strange that a man who did not lack sense in other ways should be made ridiculous by his vanity.

== Legacy ==
Thomas Macaulay in his History of England said of Rochester:

He had excellent parts, which had been improved by parliamentary and diplomatic experience; but the infirmities of his temper detracted much from the effective strength of his abilities. Negotiator and courtier as he was, he never learnt the art of governing or of concealing his emotions. When prosperous, he was insolent and boastful; when he sustained a check, his undisguised mortification doubled the triumph of his enemies: very slight provocations sufficed to kindle his anger; and when he was angry he said bitter things which he forgot as soon as he was pacified, but which others remembered many years. His quickness and penetration would have made him a consummate man of business but for his selfsufficiency and impatience. His writings prove that he had many of the qualities of an orator: but his irritability prevented him from doing himself justice in debate: for nothing was easier than to goad him into a passion; and, from the moment when he went into a passion, he was at the mercy of opponents far inferior to him in capacity. Unlike most of the leading politicians of that generation, he was a consistent, dogged, and rancorous party man, a Cavalier of the old school, a zealous champion of the Crown and of the Church, and a hater of Republicans and Nonconformists. He had consequently a great body of personal adherents. The clergy especially looked on him as their own man, and extended to his foibles an indulgence of which, to say the truth, he stood in some need, for he drank deep, and when was in a rage—and he very often was in a rage—he swore like a porter.

In John Dryden's satire, Absalom and Achitophel, he is "Hushai", the friend of David in distress.

== Notes ==
Parliament of England
Preceded by Sir Francis Drake, Bt; William Morice	Member of Parliament for Newport (Cornwall); 1660–1661; With: Sir Francis Drake, Bt	Succeeded by Sir Francis Drake, Bt; John Speccot
Preceded by Thomas Clayton; John Mylles	Member of Parliament for Oxford University; 1661–1679; With: Sir Heneage Finch, Bt 1661–1674; Thomas Thynne 1674–1679	Succeeded by Heneage Finch; John Eddisbury
Preceded by John Pleydell; Sir Walter St John, Bt	Member of Parliament for Wootton Basset; 1679–1681; With: John Pleydell 1679; Henry St John 1679–1681	Succeeded by Henry St John; John Pleydell
Court offices
Preceded by Viscount Mansfield	Master of the Robes; 1662–1678	Succeeded by Sidney Godolphin
Political offices
Preceded by The Earl of Essex	Chief Minister of Great Britain; First Lord of the Treasury; 1679–1684	Succeeded by The Lord Godolphin
Preceded by The Earl of Radnor	Lord President of the Council; 1684–1685	Succeeded by The Marquess of Halifax
Preceded by The Lord Godolphin as First Lord of the Treasury	Chief Minister of Great Britain; Lord High Treasurer; 1685–1686	Succeeded by The Lord Belasyse as First Lord of the Treasury
Vacant Title last held by The Lord Capell as Lord Deputy of Ireland	Lord Lieutenant of Ireland; 1700–1703	Succeeded by The Duke of Ormonde
Preceded by The Lord Somers	Lord President of the Council; 1710–1711	Succeeded by The Duke of Buckingham and Normanby
Honorary titles
Preceded by The Earl of Bridgewater	Lord Lieutenant of Hertfordshire; 1686–1689	Succeeded by The Earl of Shrewsbury
Preceded by The Earl of Godolphin	Lord Lieutenant and Custos Rotulorum of Cornwall; 1710–1711	Succeeded by The Earl of Rochester
Peerage of England
New creation	Earl of Rochester; 1682–1711	Succeeded by Henry Hyde
