= Sir Thomas Aylesbury, 1st Baronet =

English baronet

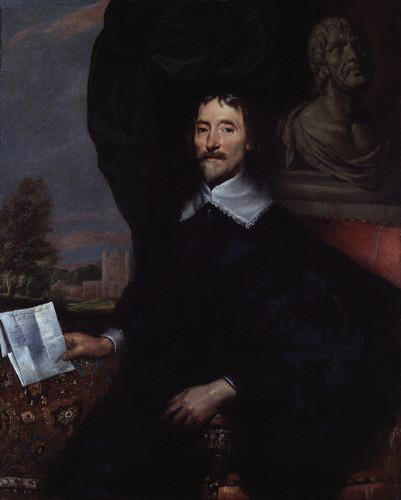
- Probable portrait

Master of the Mint (joint)
- In office 1635–1643

Personal details
- Born: 1576
- Died: 1657 (aged 80–81)
- Education: Christ Church, Oxford

Sir Thomas Aylesbury, 1st Baronet (1576 – 1657) was an English civil servant, Surveyor of the Navy from 1628 and jointly Master of the Mint from 1635, and a patron of mathematical learning. He was the great-grandfather of two British queens, Mary II and Anne.

== Life ==
He was born in London in 1576, the second son of William Aylesbury and Anne Poole. From Westminster School, Aylesbury passed in 1598 to Christ Church, Oxford, where he took the degrees of B.A. and M.A. in 1602 and 1605, respectively.

On leaving college he was appointed secretary to Charles Howard, 1st Earl of Nottingham, Lord High Admiral of England. He was continued in the post by George Villiers, 1st Duke of Buckingham, Nottingham's successor (1619), who befriended him actively, procuring for him the additional offices of one of the masters of requests with, from 19 April 1627, the title of baronet. He was Surveyor of the Navy from 1628 for four years, and naval commissioner inspecting the fleet at Portsmouth in 1630 with Phineas Pett.

In 1635 Aylesbury, jointly with Ralph Freeman, formed a commission exercising the powers of the Master of the Mint. This came about by the exclusion from the position of Robert Harley, in favour of the previous incumbent Randal Cranfield, who then died suddenly.

In 1642 he was, as a steady royalist, stripped of his fortune and places, and on the death of the king retired with his family to Antwerp. He moved in 1652 to Breda, and there died in 1657 at the age of 81.

Sir Thomas was married twice. His second marriage was to Anne Denman with whom he had five children: William, Thomas, Frances, Anne, and Barbara. Frances married Edward Hyde, 1st Earl of Clarendon, by whom she became the mother of Anne Hyde, first wife of King James II of England. It is through Anne Hyde that he became the great-grandfather of her two daughters, the queens Mary II and Anne.

== Patronage and scholarly interests ==
Sir Thomas Aylesbury supported scholars with pensions, or maintained them at his country seat, Cranbourne Lodge at Cranbourne Chase, adjoining Windsor Great Park, while others enjoyed his hospitality in London. Besides his support, he also was a pupil or at times a collaborator. Amongst his dependants were Walter Warner, who at his request wrote a treatise on coins, coinage and alloys, work also involving Charles Thynne. Another was Thomas Allen, of Oxford, whom he recommended to Buckingham, and who made him the depositary of his astrological writings. Thomas Hariot bequeathed to Aylesbury, with Robert Sidney, 1st Earl of Leicester, his papers. Warner gave an account towards the end of his life to John Pell of how with Hariot they had carried out experiments on Snell's law at Aylesbury's house. Aylesbury was involved during the 1620s in the publication of Hariot's posthumous Artis Analyticae Praxis, certainly as a financial supporter under a deal worked out with Henry Percy, 9th Earl of Northumberland; the editorial work was carried out by Warner, but Aylesbury may have contributed also. Many of the papers he had accumulated, with other manuscripts and his library, were either lost during the English Civil War, or sold when he was abroad. These included the only manuscript of the Ormulum, which from internal evidence belonged to Aylesbury before it passed to Jan van Vliet.

== Notes ==
Baronetage of England
New creation	Baronet (of London); 1627–1657	Extinct
