= Thomas Aylesbury (theologian) =

Thomas Aylesbury (fl. 1622–1659) was a theologian educated at Cambridge, where he took the degrees of M.A. and B.D. By incorporation he was granted similar degrees at Oxford, the first on 9 July 1622, and the second on 10 July 1626.

== Works ==
- Sermon preached on Paul's Cross, June 1622, on Luke xvii. 37, London, 1623.
- Paganisme and Papisme parallel'd and set forth in a Sermon at the Temple Church upon the Feast Day of All Saints, 1623, by Thomas Ailesbury, Student in Diuinite (dedicated to the Earl of Southampton)
- Treatise of the Confession of Sin, with the Power of the Keys, 1657
- Diatribæ de æterno divini beneplaciti circa creaturas intellectuales decreto, ubi patrum consulta, scholasticorum scita et modernorum placita ad Sacrte Script urae amussim et orthodoxæ ecclesife tribunal deferuntur, Cambridge, 1659, and republished (according to Watt) in 1661. This work, which, like all Aylesbury's writings, was of a strongly Calvinistic character, was dedicated to the Protestant churches of Europe.
