= Anne Hyde =

Duchess of York and Albany; first wife of the future James II of England

- Duchess of York and Albany
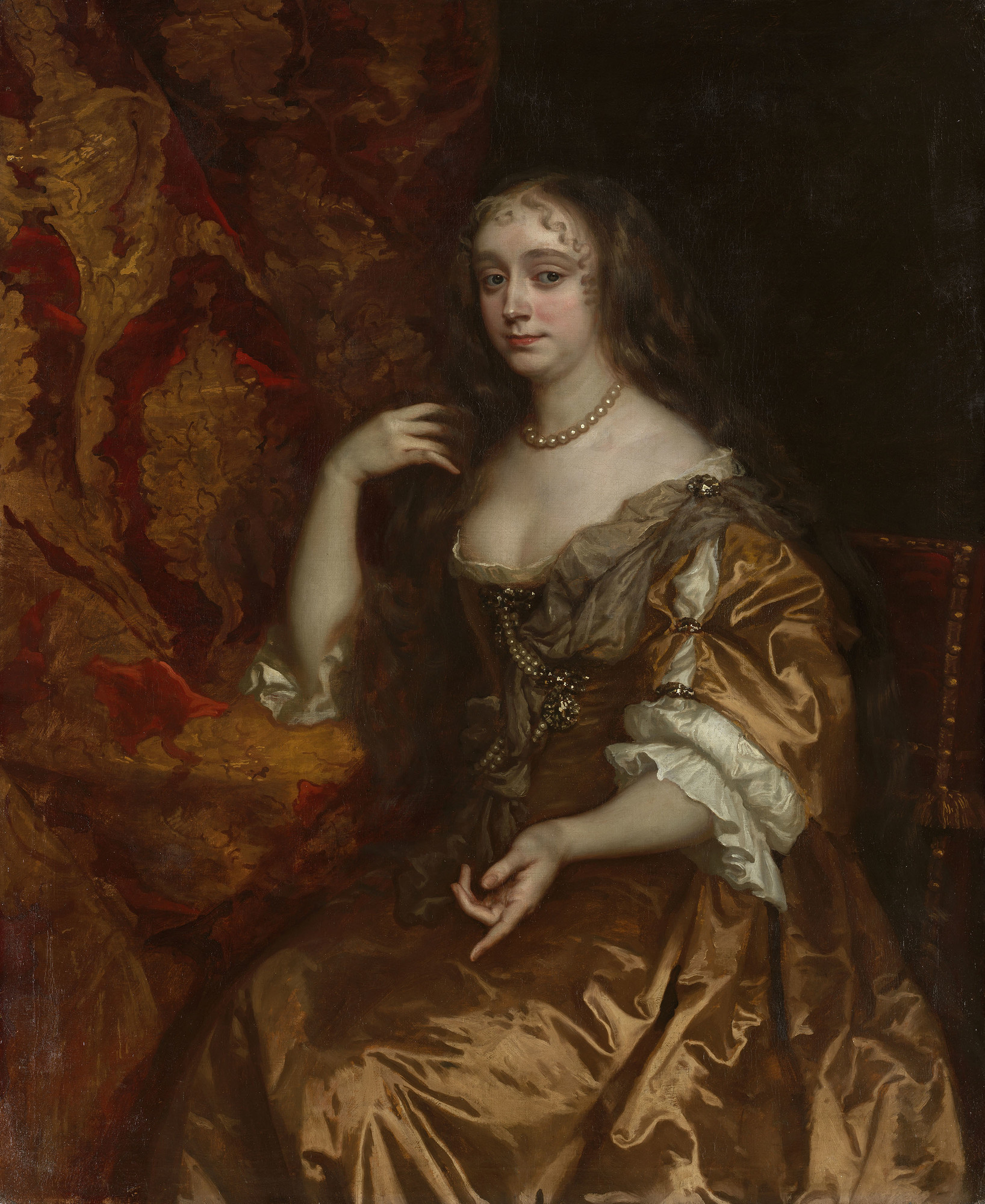
- Portrait by Lely, c. 1665
- Born: 12 March 1637; Windsor, Berkshire, England
- Died: 31 March 1671 (aged 34); St James's Palace, Westminster, Middlesex, England
- Burial: 5 April 1671; Westminster Abbey
- Spouse: James, Duke of York and Albany (later James VII and II) (m. 1660)
- Issue more...: Charles, Duke of Cambridge; Mary II, Queen of England, Scotland, and Ireland; James, Duke of Cambridge; Anne, Queen of Great Britain and Ireland; Charles, Duke of Kendal; Edgar, Duke of Cambridge
- Father: Edward Hyde, 1st Earl of Clarendon
- Mother: Frances Aylesbury
- Religion: Roman Catholic prev. Anglican

Anne Hyde (12 March 1637 – 31 March 1671) (Note: All the dates in this article are Old Style.) was the first wife of James, Duke of York and Albany, who later became James II of England in 1685, and the mother of future queens Mary II and Anne. As she died before James ascended the throne, she was never queen.

Anne was the daughter of a member of the English gentry—Edward Hyde (later created Earl of Clarendon)—and met her future husband when they were both living in exile in the Netherlands. She married James in 1660 and two months later gave birth to the couple's first child, who had been conceived out of wedlock. Some observers disapproved of the marriage, but James's brother, King Charles II of England, wanted the marriage to take place. Another cause of disapproval was the public affection James showed toward Anne. They had eight children, of whom six died in early childhood; the two who reached adulthood were future monarchs, Mary II and Anne. James was a known philanderer who kept many mistresses, for which Anne often reproached him, and he fathered many illegitimate children.

Originally an Anglican, Anne converted to Catholicism soon after her marriage to James. She had been exposed to Catholicism during visits to the Netherlands and France and was strongly attracted thereto. Partly due to Anne's influence, James also converted to Catholicism, which ultimately led to the Glorious Revolution. She developed advanced breast cancer and died shortly after giving birth to her eighth child.

== Early years (1637–1660) ==
In 1629, Edward Hyde married his first wife, Anne Ayliffe of Grittenham. Six months into the marriage, Anne caught smallpox, miscarried and died. Three years later, Hyde married Frances Aylesbury. The couple's eldest daughter was born at Cranbourne Lodge in Windsor in 1637. The parents named her Anne after Edward Hyde's first wife. Almost nothing is known of her life before 1649, when her family fled to the Netherlands after the execution of the deposed King Charles I.

During the First English Civil War, her father was a leading advisor to Charles I, then went into exile with his son Charles II in 1646. Like many refugees, they settled in Breda, where Mary of Orange offered shelter to many English fugitives. Mary appointed Anne a maid of honour, apparently against the wishes of her mother Henrietta Maria, who loathed Hyde.

Anne became a general favourite with the people she met either at The Hague or at the Princess of Orange's country house at Teylingen. She was attractive and stylish, and she attracted many men. One of the first men to fall in love with Anne was Spencer Compton, a son of the Earl of Northampton. However, Anne quickly fell in love with Henry Jermyn, who returned her feelings. Anne dismissed Jermyn just as quickly when she met James, Duke of York, the son of the deposed king. On 24 November 1659, two or three years after she first met him, James promised he would marry Anne, despite the opposition of many, including her father, who confined her to a room and allegedly urged Charles to execute her. Charles rejected this advice, suggesting Anne's strong character would be a positive influence on his weak-willed brother.

== Duchess of York (1660–1671) ==
=== Marriage ===
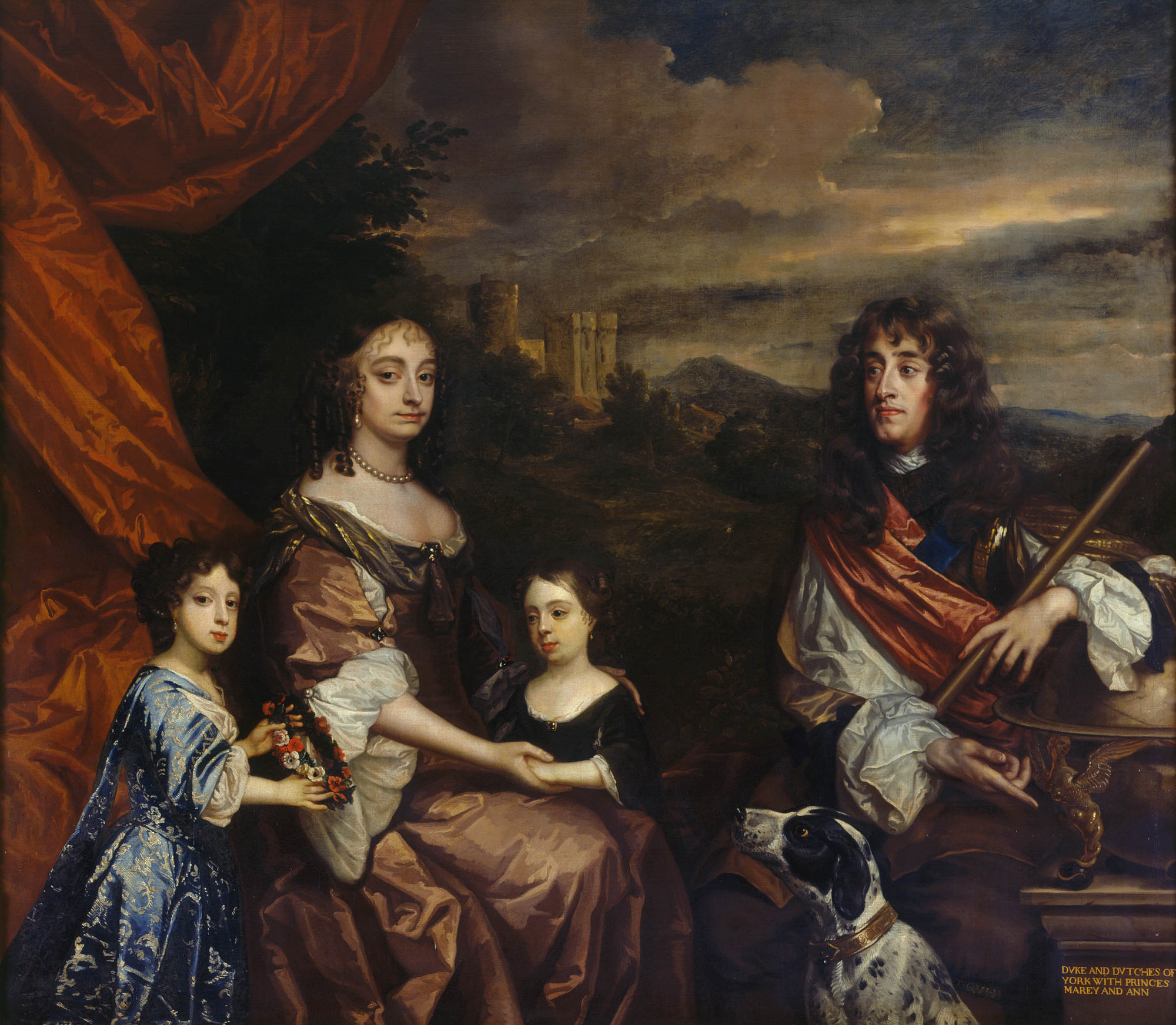
A portrait of Anne, James and their two daughters, Lady Mary and Lady Anne (this portrait is based on an earlier portrait of Anne and James.)

After Anne became visibly pregnant in 1660, the couple were obliged to marry. Following the Restoration of the monarchy in May 1660, they held an official but private marriage ceremony in London on 3 September 1660. The wedding took place between 11 at night and 2 in the morning at Worcester House—her father's house in the Strand—and was solemnised by Dr. Joseph Crowther, James's chaplain. The French Ambassador described Anne as having "courage, cleverness, and energy almost worthy of a King's blood". She would be the last Englishwoman to legally marry the first in line to the throne until Lady Diana Spencer in 1981.

The couple's first child, Charles, was born in October of that year, but died seven months later. Seven children followed: Mary (1662–1694), James (1663–1667), Anne (1665–1714), Charles (1666–1667), Edgar (1667–1671), Henrietta (1669–1669) and Catherine (1671–1671). All of their sons and two of their daughters died in infancy.

Even well after their marriage, some observers disapproved of the prince's decision, regardless of what he had promised beforehand. Samuel Pepys said of the marriage: "... that the Duke of York's marriage with her hath undone the kingdom, by making the Chancellor so great above reach, who otherwise would have been but an ordinary man, to have been dealt with by other people ..." After Anne's death, the royal court tried to find a new wife for James, but this new wife was not, under any circumstances, to be of humble birth. As good a father as Pepys portrayed James to be, he strangely stated that Anne and James were unaffected by the death of their firstborn son. Pepys also described Anne as "not only the proudest woman in the world, but the most expensefull." Even in the minds of James's nephew (later to become Anne's son-in-law), William III of Orange, and that of her husband's cousin, Sophia of Hanover, the stigma of the Hydes' lowly birth remained.

=== Domestic life ===
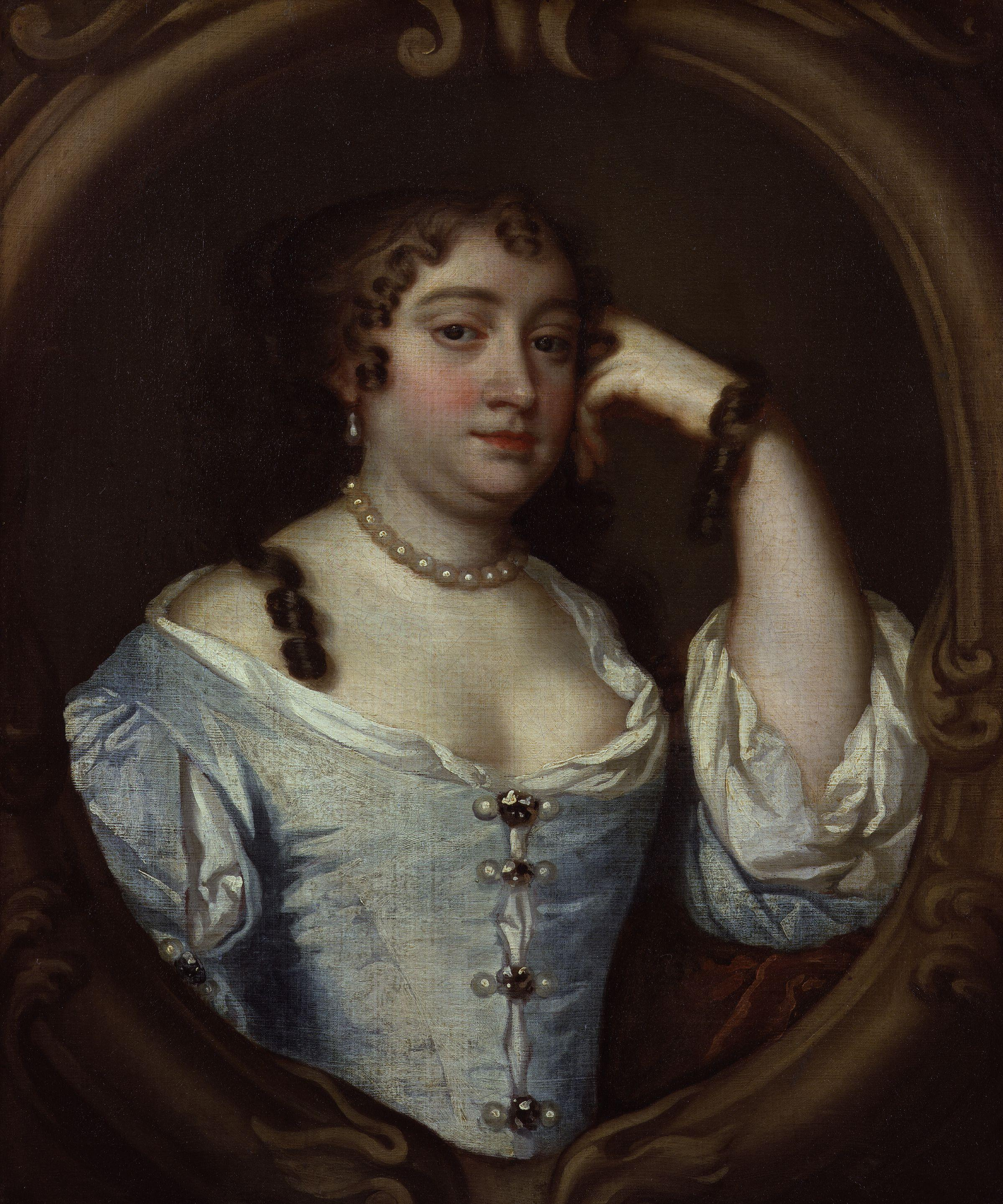
Anne, painted by Lely about 1670

Anne was not popular at court, although she was well liked by her brother-in-law. Regarded as "the most unguarded ogler of his time", James had a succession of mistresses throughout their marriage. These mistresses included Arabella Churchill, mother of his illegitimate son, the Duke of Berwick. Berwick had a highly successful career in the French army, while James secured a series of positions for Arabella's brother, John Churchill.

Anne was not oblivious to her husband's infidelities, Pepys recording that she was jealous and chided James. Pepys also claimed, however, that the pair were notorious for showing their affections publicly, kissing and leaning on each other. In another entry, Pepys wrote that when James fell in love with Lady Chesterfield, Anne complained to Charles so insistently that Lady Chesterfield had to retreat to the countryside, where she remained until she died.

Historian John Callow claims Anne "made the greatest single impact" in the process that led to James becoming a Catholic. Raised in the Anglican high church tradition which was closely linked to the forms and practices of Catholicism, Anne stopped attending Anglican service in 1669. James converted around the same time, but at Charles' request delayed the announcement of his conversion until 1673. Although he later converted to Catholicism on his deathbed, Charles insisted for political reasons that his brother's children must be raised as Protestants, so both Mary and Anne were members of the Church of England.

== Death and legacy ==
Anne Hyde's coat of arms

Anne was ill for fifteen months after the birth of her youngest son, Edgar. She bore Henrietta in 1669 and Catherine in 1671, never recovering from Catherine's birth. Ill with breast cancer, she died on 31 March 1671, aged 34. (Note: England used the Julian calendar (OS) during Anne's lifetime.) On her deathbed, her brothers Henry and Laurence tried to bring an Anglican priest to give her communion, but Anne refused and she received viaticum of the Catholic Church. Two days after her death, her embalmed body was interred in the vault of Mary, Queen of Scots, at Westminster Abbey's Henry VII Chapel. In June 1671, Anne's only surviving son Edgar died of natural causes, followed by Catherine in December, leaving Mary and Anne as her husband's only legitimate children.

After Anne Hyde's death, a portrait of her painted by Willem Wissing was commissioned by the future Mary II; this used to hang above the door of the Queen's Drawing Room of the Garden House at Windsor Castle. Two years after the death of his first wife, James married a Catholic princess, Mary of Modena. Mary bore James Francis Edward, James's only son to survive to adulthood. James became king of England, Ireland and Scotland in 1685, but was deposed during the Glorious Revolution of 1688. The throne was then offered by the Parliament of England to Anne's eldest daughter Mary and her husband William III of Orange. After Mary died in 1694 and William in 1702, Anne Hyde's only surviving child Anne became queen of the three kingdoms and, in 1707, the first sovereign of the united Kingdom of Great Britain.

== Issue ==
Name	Birth	Death	Notes
Charles, Duke of Cambridge	22 October 1660	5 May 1661	Born two months after his parents' legal marriage, died aged seven months of smallpox
Mary II	30 April 1662	28 December 1694	Married her cousin William III, Prince of Orange, in 1677. She and her husband ascended the throne in 1689 after the deposition of her father. No surviving issue
James, Duke of Cambridge	12 July 1663	20 June 1667	Died of the bubonic plague
Anne, Queen of Great Britain and Ireland	6 February 1665	1 August 1714	Married Prince George of Denmark in 1683. Successor of her brother-in-law and cousin in 1702. First monarch of Great Britain under the Act of Union of 1707. No surviving issue
Charles, Duke of Kendal	4 July 1666	22 May 1667	Died of convulsions
Edgar, Duke of Cambridge	14 September 1667	8 June 1671	Died in childhood
Henrietta	13 January 1669	15 November 1669	Died in infancy
Catherine	9 February 1671	5 December 1671	Died in infancy
