= Alastair Windsor, 2nd Duke of Connaught and Strathearn =

Member of the British royal family (1914–1943)

Lieutenant His Grace The Duke of Connaught and Strathearn
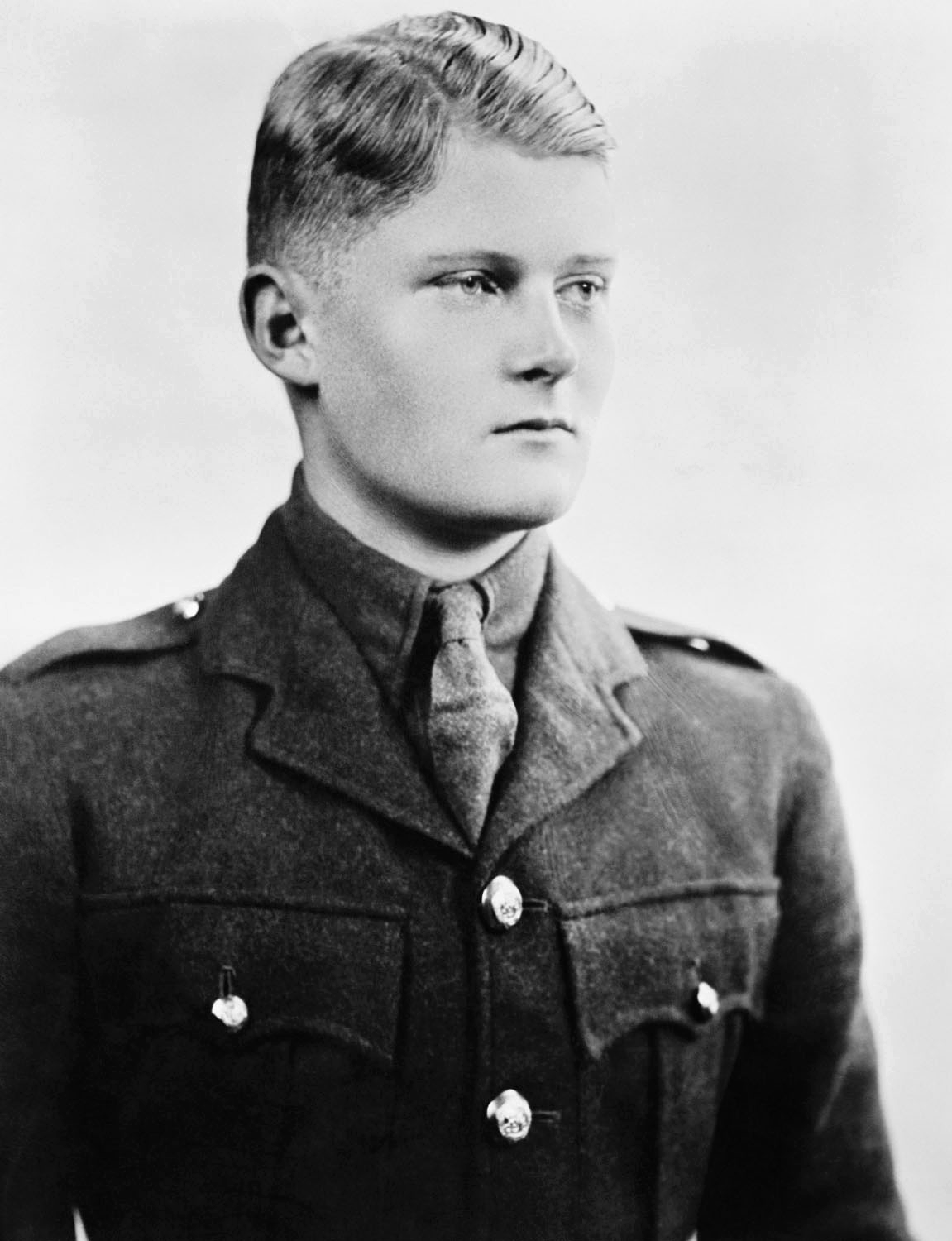
- Alastair, circa 1932
- Full name: Alastair Arthur Windsor
- Born: Prince Alastair of Connaught; 9 August 1914; Mayfair, London, England
- Died: 26 April 1943 (aged 28); Ottawa, Ontario, Canada
- Buried: St Ninian's Chapel, Braemar, Aberdeenshire, Scotland
- Noble family: Saxe-Coburg and Gotha (until 1917); Windsor (from 1917)
- Father: Prince Arthur of Connaught
- Mother: Princess Alexandra, 2nd Duchess of Fife
- Occupation: Military officer
- Military career
- Allegiance: United Kingdom
- Branch: British Army
- Service years: 1935–43
- Unit: Royal Scots Greys
- Conflicts: Second World War

Alastair Arthur Windsor, 2nd Duke of Connaught and Strathearn (9 August 1914 – 26 April 1943) was a member of the British royal family. He was the only child of Prince Arthur of Connaught and Princess Alexandra, 2nd Duchess of Fife. He was a paternal great-grandson and maternal great-great-grandson of Queen Victoria. He was also a descendant of Victoria's paternal uncle and predecessor, William IV, through an illegitimate line.

In January 1942, he became the second Duke of Connaught and Strathearn and Earl of Sussex when he inherited his grandfather's titles. Fifteen months later, at the age of 28, he died of exposure in Canada. Because he never married and had no children, his titles became extinct.

== Birth and family ==
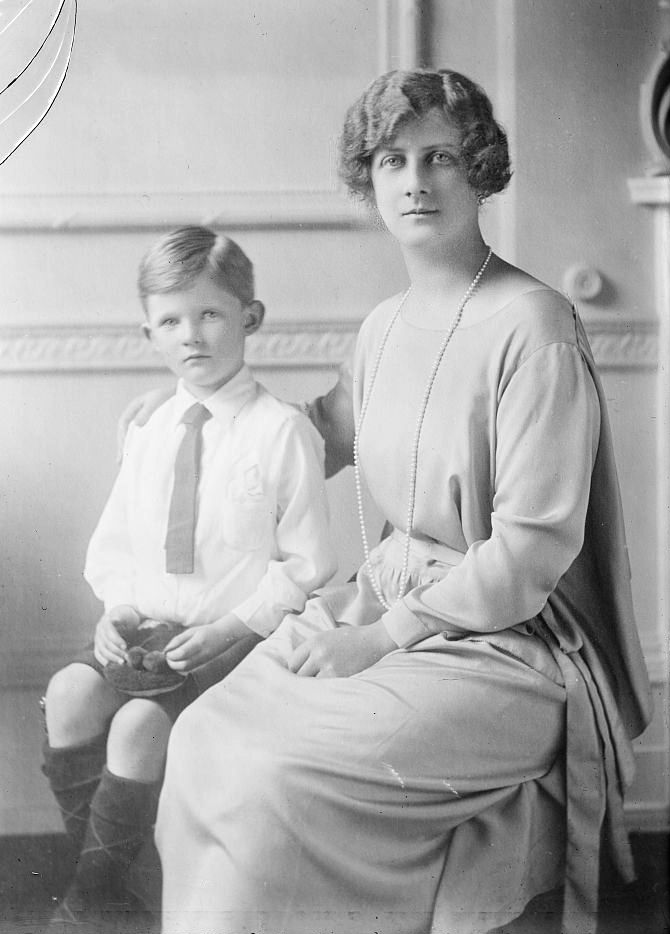
Portrait with his mother

Alastair was born on 9 August 1914 at his parents' home at 54 Mount Street, Mayfair, London (now the Brazilian Embassy). His father was Prince Arthur of Connaught, the only son of Prince Arthur, Duke of Connaught and Strathearn, and Princess Louise Margaret of Prussia. His mother was Princess Alexandra, 2nd Duchess of Fife, the eldest daughter of Alexander Duff, 1st Duke of Fife, and Louise, Princess Royal. Alastair was thus a great-grandchild of Queen Victoria through his father and great-great grandchild of her through his mother.

He was baptised on 1 September 1914 at his parents' home.

== Earl of Macduff ==
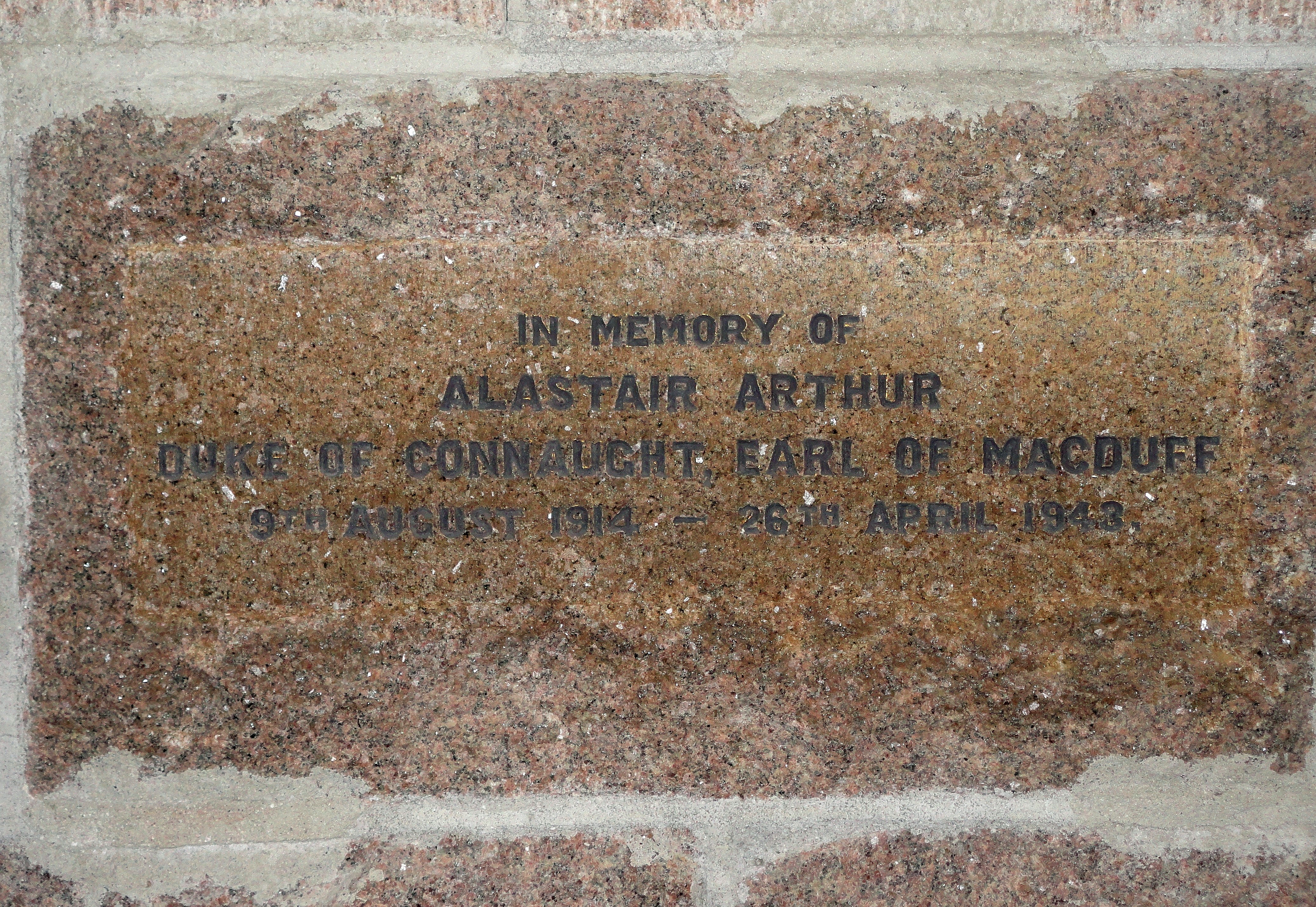
Inscription at St Ninian's Chapel, Braemar commemorating the 2nd Duke of Connaught (1914–1943)

Alastair was born shortly after the outbreak of the First World War, during which George V restructured the royal family by restricting the titles of prince and princess to the children of the sovereign, the children of the sovereign's sons, and the eldest living son of the eldest son of the Prince of Wales. This excluded Alastair from a princely title, but as the heir apparent to his mother's suo jure dukedom of Fife, he was entitled to use her secondary peerage Earl of Macduff as a courtesy title.

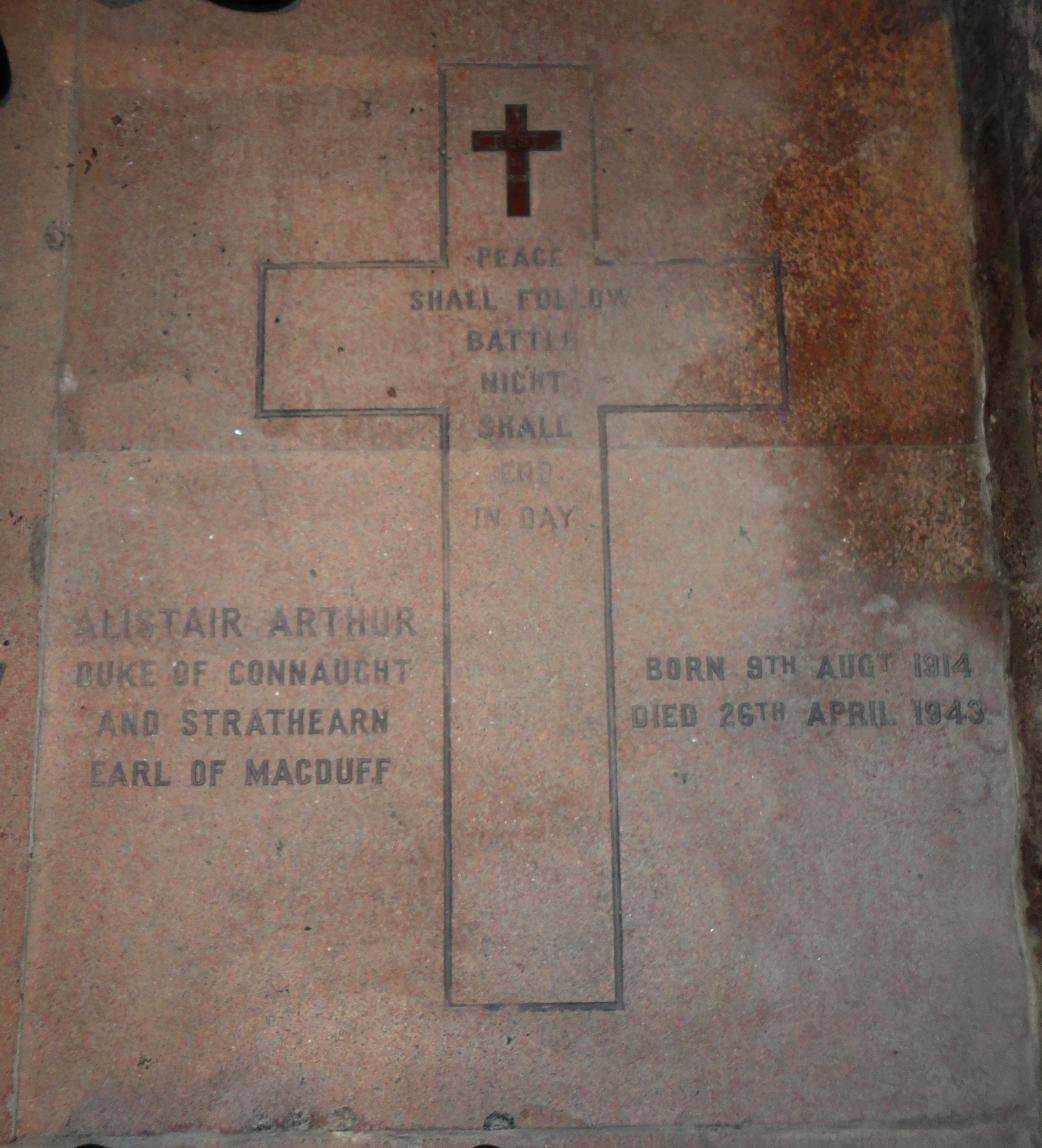
Braemar, Mar Lodge Estate, St Ninian's Chapel - Grave of the 2nd Duke of Connaught (1914–1943)

Lord Macduff was educated at Bryanston and the Royal Military College, Sandhurst, and was commissioned on 31 January 1935 as a second lieutenant into the Royal Scots Greys (2nd Dragoons), his father's regiment, then based in Egypt. On 14 July 1939, Lord Macduff was promoted to lieutenant and was later assigned to Ottawa as aide-de-camp to his kinsman the Earl of Athlone, then Governor General of Canada; his own grandfather had held the same post during the First World War.

== Duke of Connaught and Strathearn ==
His father having died in 1938, Alastair succeeded, on his grandfather's death in 1942, to the titles Duke of Connaught and Strathearn and Earl of Sussex. However, he died in 1943 at the age of 28 "on active service" in Ottawa, Ontario, Canada, in unusual circumstances. Newspapers at the time reported that he died of "natural causes."

Theo Aronson, in his 1981 biography of Princess Alice, Countess of Athlone, simply stated that the Duke "was found dead on the floor of his room at Rideau Hall on the morning of 26 April 1943. He had died, apparently, from hypothermia." The diaries of Sir Alan Lascelles, King George VI's private secretary, published in 2006, recorded that both the regiment and Athlone had rejected him as incompetent; and those of Chips Channon that he fell out of a window when drunk and perished of hypothermia overnight.

His ashes were interred at St Ninian's Chapel, Braemar, Scotland.

== Titles, styles, honours and arms ==
Coat of arms

=== Titles and styles ===
- 9 August 1914 – 20 November 1917: His Highness Prince Alastair of Connaught
- 20 November 1917 – 16 January 1942: Earl of Macduff
- 16 January 1942 – 26 April 1943: His Grace The Duke of Connaught and Strathearn

=== Arms ===
In 1942, on the inheritance of his paternal grandfather's dukedom, he was granted arms, being, quarterly, first and fourth his paternal grandfather's arms (being the royal arms, differenced with a three-point label argent, the first and third points bearing fleurs-de-lys azure, the second a cross gules), second and third his maternal grandfather's arms (quartering Fife and Duff).

Upon his death, the Dukedom of Connaught and Strathearn and the Earldom of Sussex became extinct. His first cousin, James Carnegie (23 September 1929 – 22 June 2015), succeeded as 3rd Duke of Fife and Earl of Macduff upon Princess Alexandra's death on 26 February 1959.

== Ancestry ==
Ancestors of Alastair Windsor, 2nd Duke of Connaught and Strathearn

8. Prince Albert of Saxe-Coburg and Gotha
4. Prince Arthur, Duke of Connaught and Strathearn
9. Victoria of the United Kingdom
2. Prince Arthur of Connaught
10. Prince Frederick Charles of Prussia
5. Princess Louise Margaret of Prussia
11. Princess Maria Anna of Anhalt-Dessau
1. Alastair Windsor, 2nd Duke of Connaught and Strathearn
12. James Duff, 5th Earl Fife
6. Alexander Duff, 1st Duke of Fife
13. Lady Agnes Hay
3. Princess Alexandra, 2nd Duchess of Fife
14. Edward VII of the United Kingdom
7. Louise, Princess Royal
15. Princess Alexandra of Denmark

Alastair Windsor, 2nd Duke of Connaught and Strathearn House of Windsor Cadet branch of the House of Wettin Born: 9 August 1914 Died: 26 April 1943
Peerage of the United Kingdom
Preceded by The Prince Arthur	Duke of Connaught and Strathearn; Earl of Sussex; 1942–1943	Extinct
