= St Ninian's Chapel, Braemar =

Grade B listed Anglican chapel in Scotland

Coordinates: 56°59′32″N 3°29′18″W

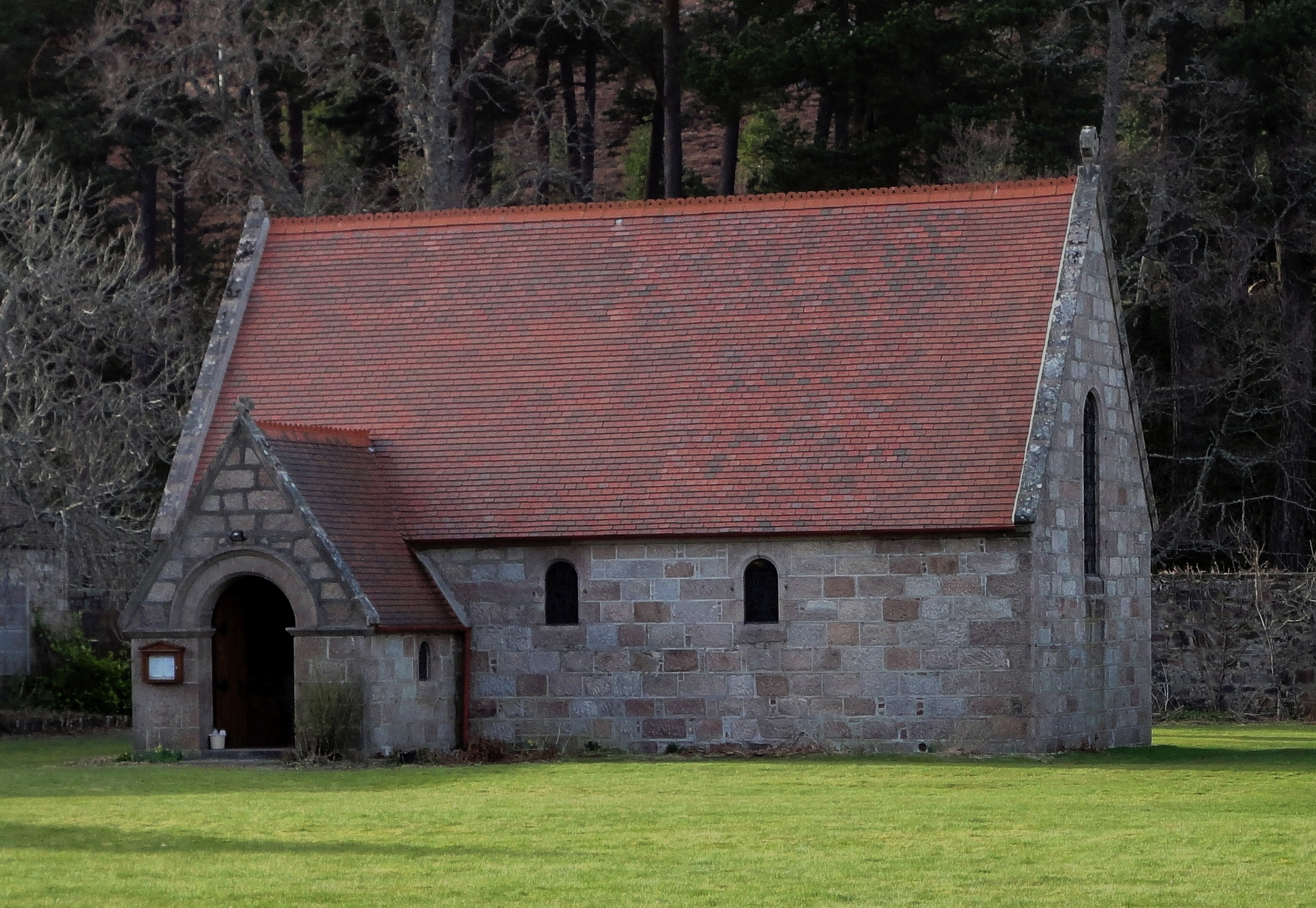
St Ninian's Chapel, Mar Lodge Estate

St Ninian's Chapel in Braemar, Aberdeenshire, Scotland, is a Category B listed Anglican chapel located in the grounds of the Mar Lodge Estate. Built from 1895 to 1898 for use as a private chapel by the family of Alexander Duff, 1st Duke of Fife, owners of Mar Lodge, it has been the property of the Diocese of Aberdeen and Orkney in the Scottish Episcopal Church since 1899. St Ninian's Chapel is the most westerly church in the Diocese.

== History ==
St Ninian's Chapel has always been closely associated with Mar Lodge and its various owners.

=== Foundation and ownership ===
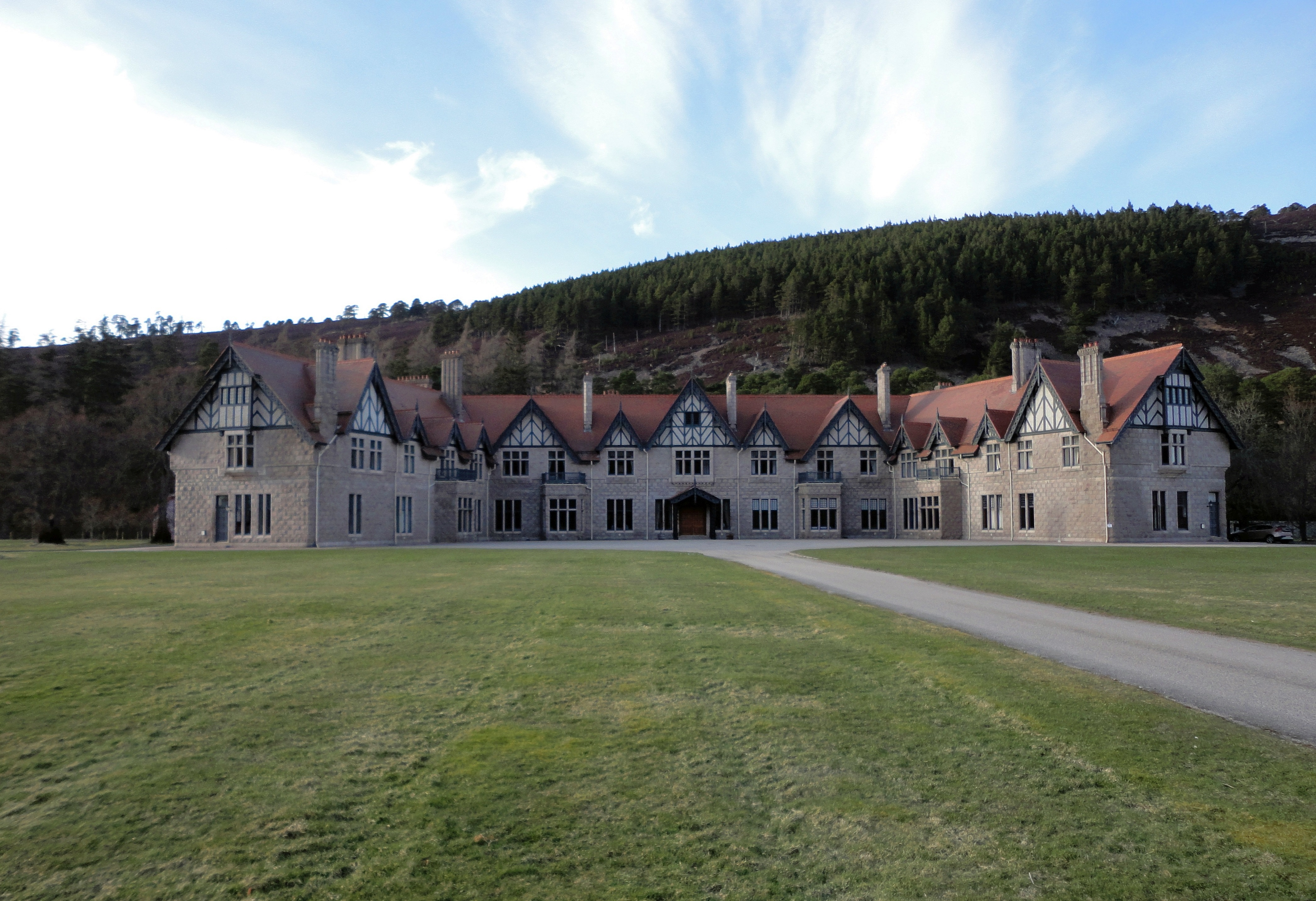
Mar Lodge

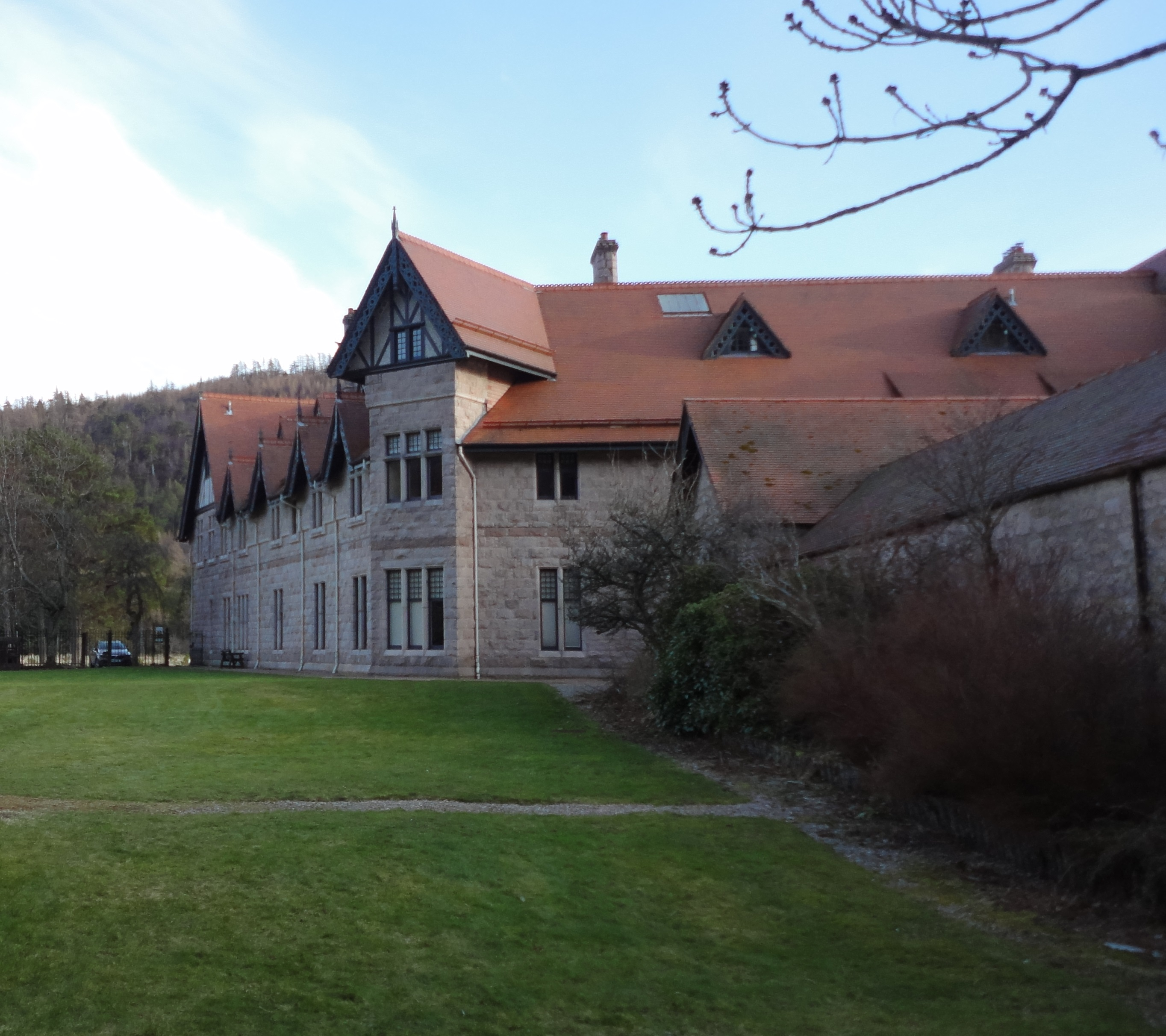
Mar Lodge, as seen from St Ninian's Chapel

St Ninian's Chapel was built at the same time as Mar Lodge. The foundation stone of Mar Lodge was laid by Queen Victoria on 15 October 1895. The house was completed in 1898. The architect of both Mar Lodge and St Ninian's Chapel was Alexander Marshall Mackenzie of Aberdeen, whose appointment seems to have been due to the fact that Queen Victoria thought highly of the design of Crathie Church (1893) and recommended him to her grandson-in-law, Alexander Duff, 1st Duke of Fife.

An account of the building costs compiled in 1898 lists the project as "Mar Lodge and Chapel" and the contractors Alexander Marshall McKenzie as architect, Mr Edgar Gauld as builder, and McRobbie & Milne as carpenters. The contract period was 34 months; work commenced in November 1895 and was completed in August 1898. The costs for the buildings are listed as Lodge – £31,720 4s 8d; Stables – £6,719 11s 4d; Chapel – £761 17s 1d; amounting to a total of £38,661 13s 1d. The professional fees payable are listed as Architect – £1,930 1s 10d; Consultant Electrical – £150; Inspector of Works – £317 3s 1d; amounting to a total of £2,397 4s 11d.

Immediately after St Ninian's Chapel was completed, the Duke of Fife made a disposition to "the Right Reverend Father in God, Arthur Gascoigne Douglas, Doctor of Divinity, Bishop of Aberdeen and Orkney in the Episcopal Church of Scotland" conveying the ownership of the chapel to the Diocese of Aberdeen and Orkney. The disposition was registered in Edinburgh on 14 January 1899. At that time St Ninian's became the property of the Diocese of Aberdeen and Orkney and has remained so ever since.

=== Use as a private chapel ===
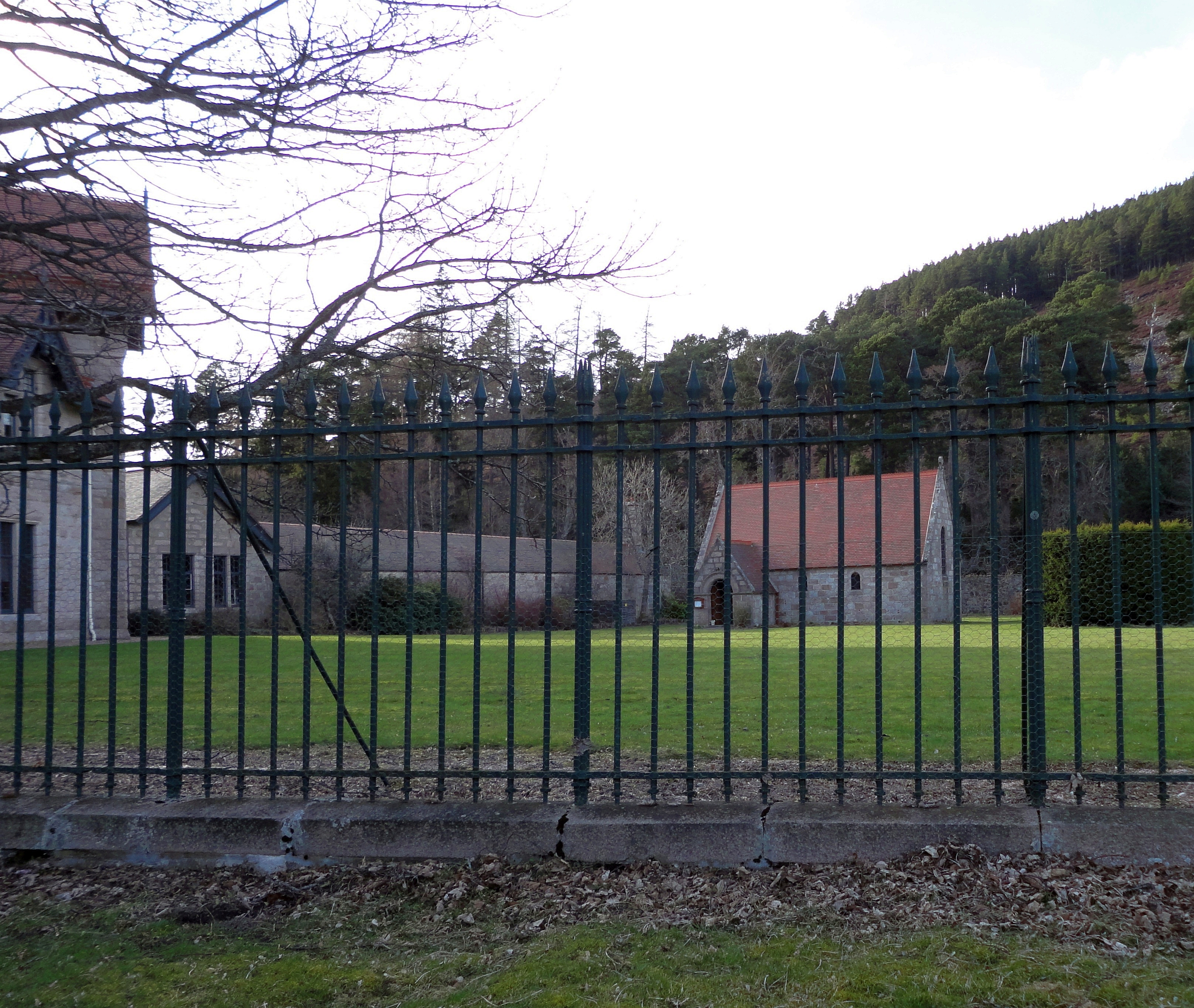
St Ninian's Chapel in the grounds of Mar Lodge

Next to Balmoral Castle, more Royal guests visited Mar Lodge than any other house in Scotland at that time. During the annual hunting season the Duke of Fife would hold functions for guests, tenants, and employees in the unique ballroom decorated with 3,000 stags heads. One may assume that St Ninian's Chapel would have been used regularly by the ducal family and their guests for services.

The 1st Duke of Fife died in 1912. Under the terms of his will, Mar Estate came into possession of Trustees, who administered it on behalf of his eldest daughter, Princess Alexandra, 2nd Duchess of Fife. St Ninian's Chapel continued to be used as a private chapel until it passed out of her ownership in 1959. There are no surviving records of services held during the time the chapel was in private use.

On the 2nd Duchess of Fife's death in 1959, the Mar Estate passed to Captain Alexander Ramsay, son of Princess Patricia of Connaught. At the same time the dukedom of Fife passed to the 2nd Duchess of Fife's nephew James Carnegie, Lord Carnegie, the son of her sister Princess Maud who had married the 11th Earl of Southesk who was born on 3 April 1893 at East Sheen Richmond-upon- Thames - Surrey - London - England and died on 14 December 1945 at the age of 52 years from bronchitis at a nursing home in London - England. Because of the enormous death duties payable on the 2nd Duchess of Fife's death, a large part of the Mar Estate had to be sold. It was divided into Mar Lodge Estate north of the river Dee and Mar Estate south of the river Dee. The Trustees eventually sold Mar Lodge Estate to a property company, after which it passed through several hands until it was acquired by the National Trust for Scotland in 1995.

== Description ==
=== Location ===
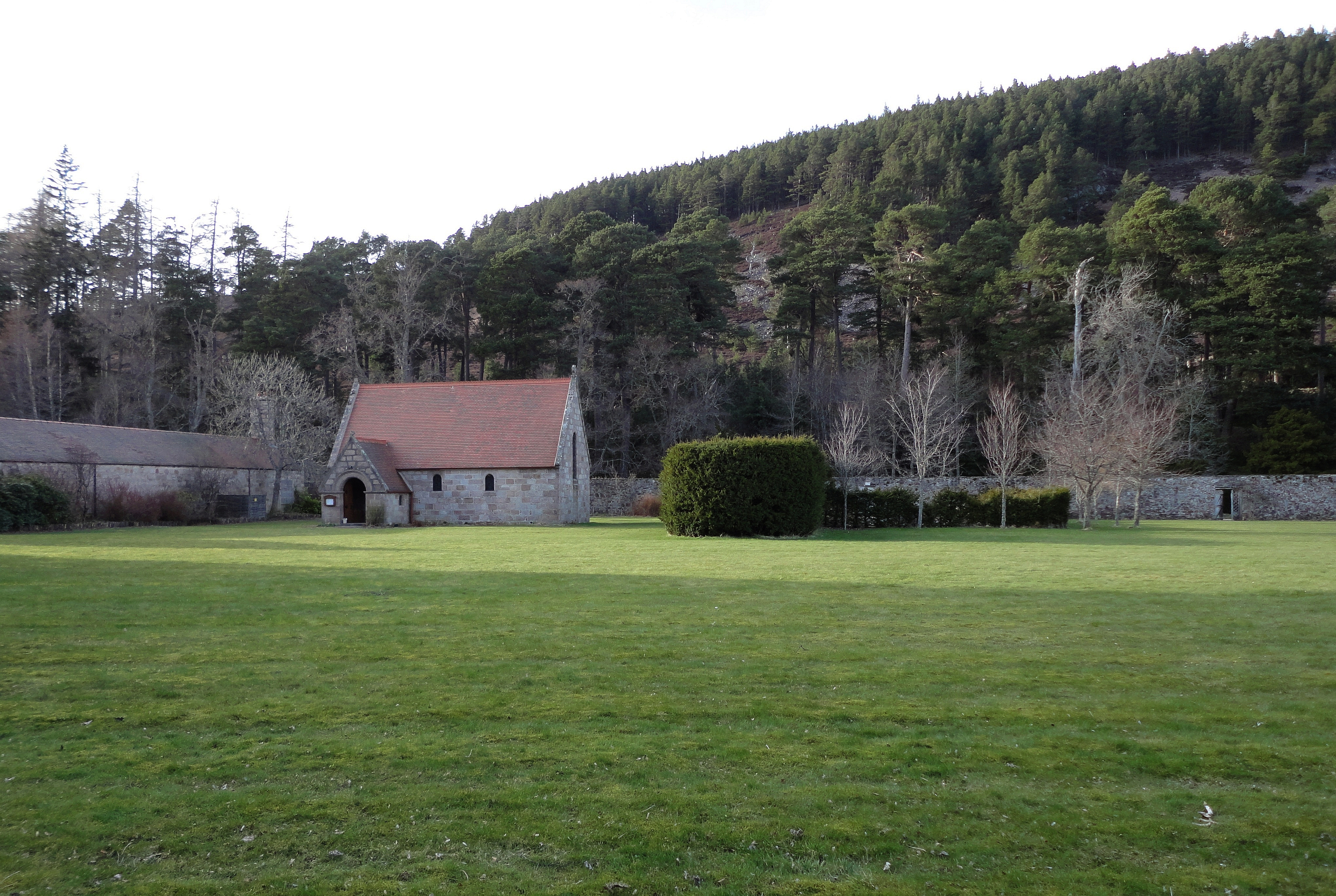
Location of the chapel in the large walled garden area

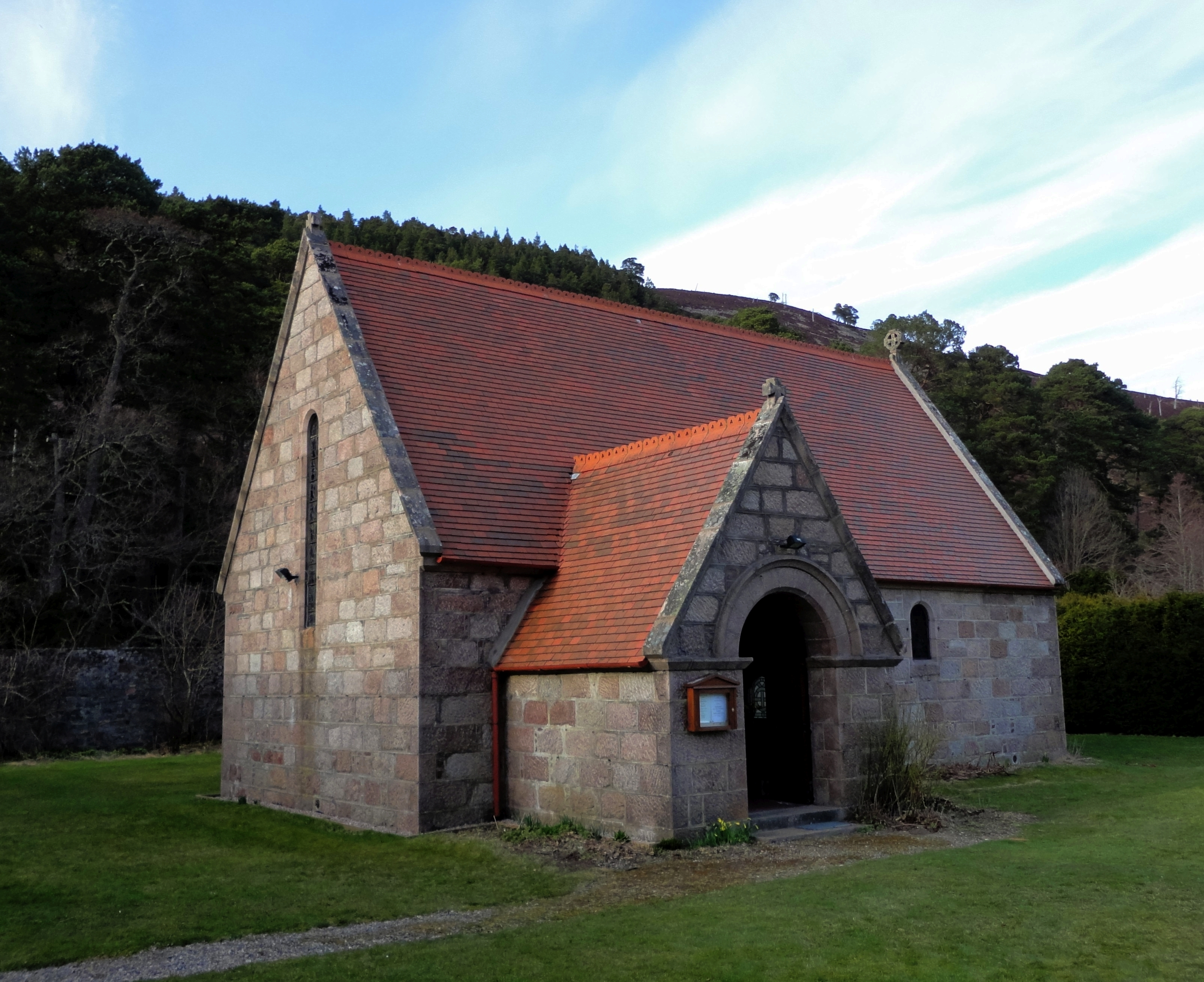
St Ninian's Chapel, south side with entrance porch

St Ninian's Chapel is located in the grounds of the Mar Lodge Estate, a hunting lodge and former residence of the Duke and Duchess of Fife. The lodge and chapel are located in a rural setting, south of a steep hillside and close to the road through the valley. Open, flat parkland belonging to the estate stretches to the south with numerous trackways and paths. The chapel itself is built close to the Mar Lodge complex, within a large walled garden area separated from the surrounding parkland by an iron grille fence.

=== Exterior ===
St Ninian's Chapel is a small rectangular building in a neo-Romanesque style with a gabled porch on the south elevation. It was built using large, tooled red granite blocks with ashlar detailing stones. The dressed stone used for Mar Lodge and St Ninian's Chapel came from the Hill of Fare Banchory and the undressed stone from the quarry at the top of Chapel Brae, Braemar. The timber was from local Caledonian Pine. The roof has small red tiles with decorative red ridge tiles.

The north side has three small round-arched windows, again with stained glass. The west gable has a single pointed-arch window with stained glass, while the east gable has a single, large round-arch window with stained glass with a cross finial on the apex of the roof above.

The south side has two small round-arched windows, each with stained glass. The entrance porch is at the western end. It has a round-arched doorway with a simple hoodmould above. There is a double-leaf timber door with decorative iron hinges. There is a small cross finial on the apex.

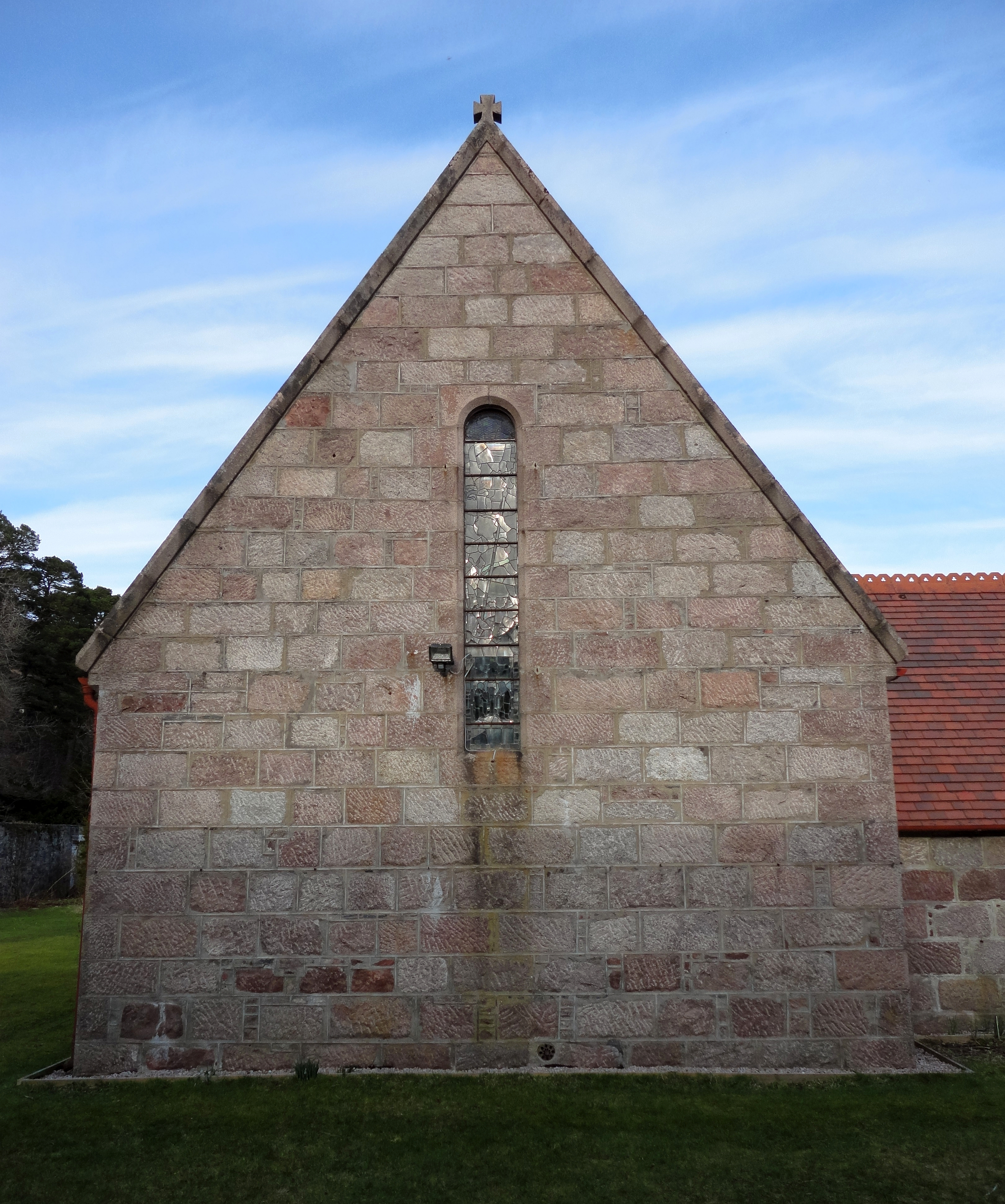
St Ninian's Chapel, west side

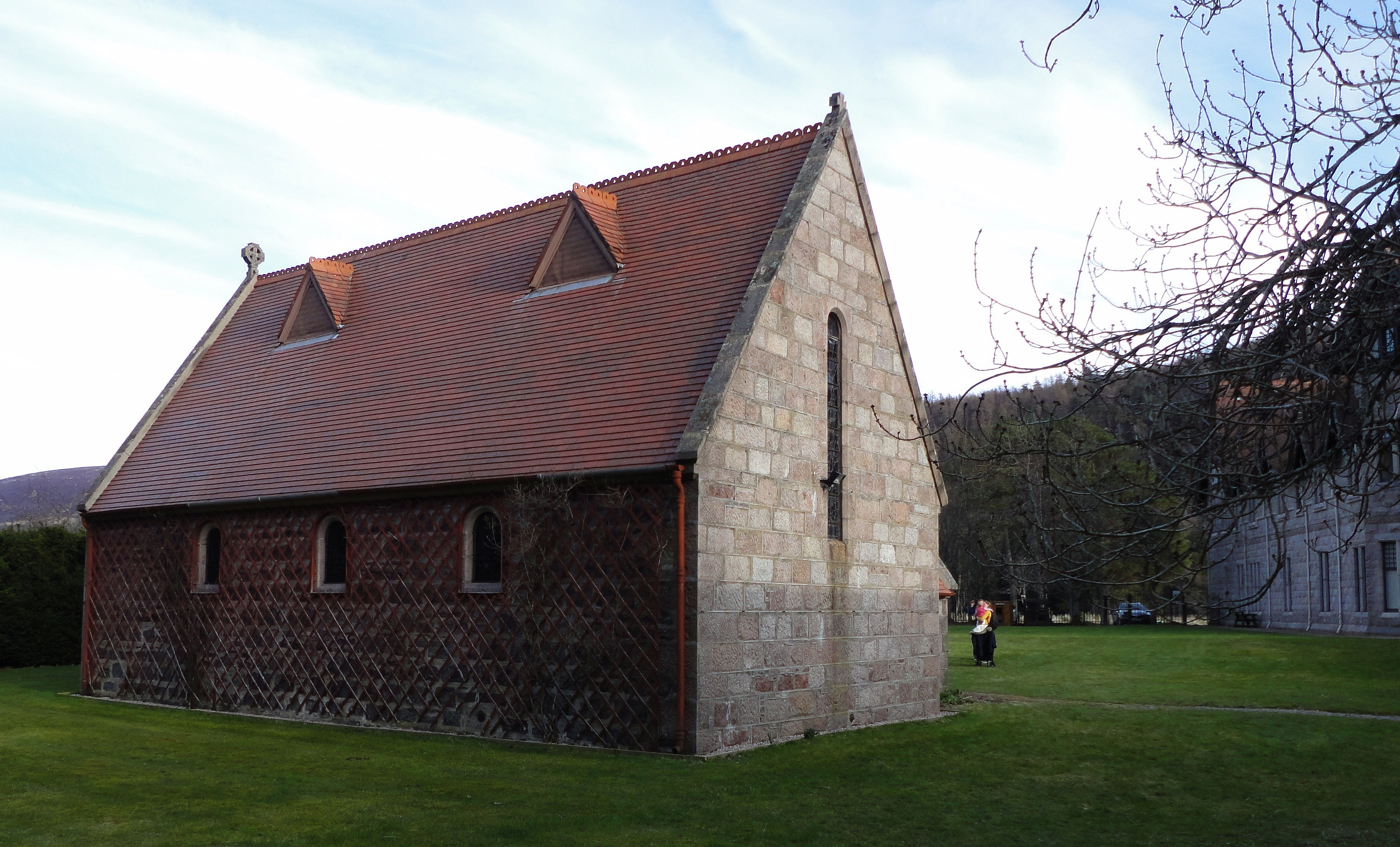
St Ninian's Chapel, north side looking west

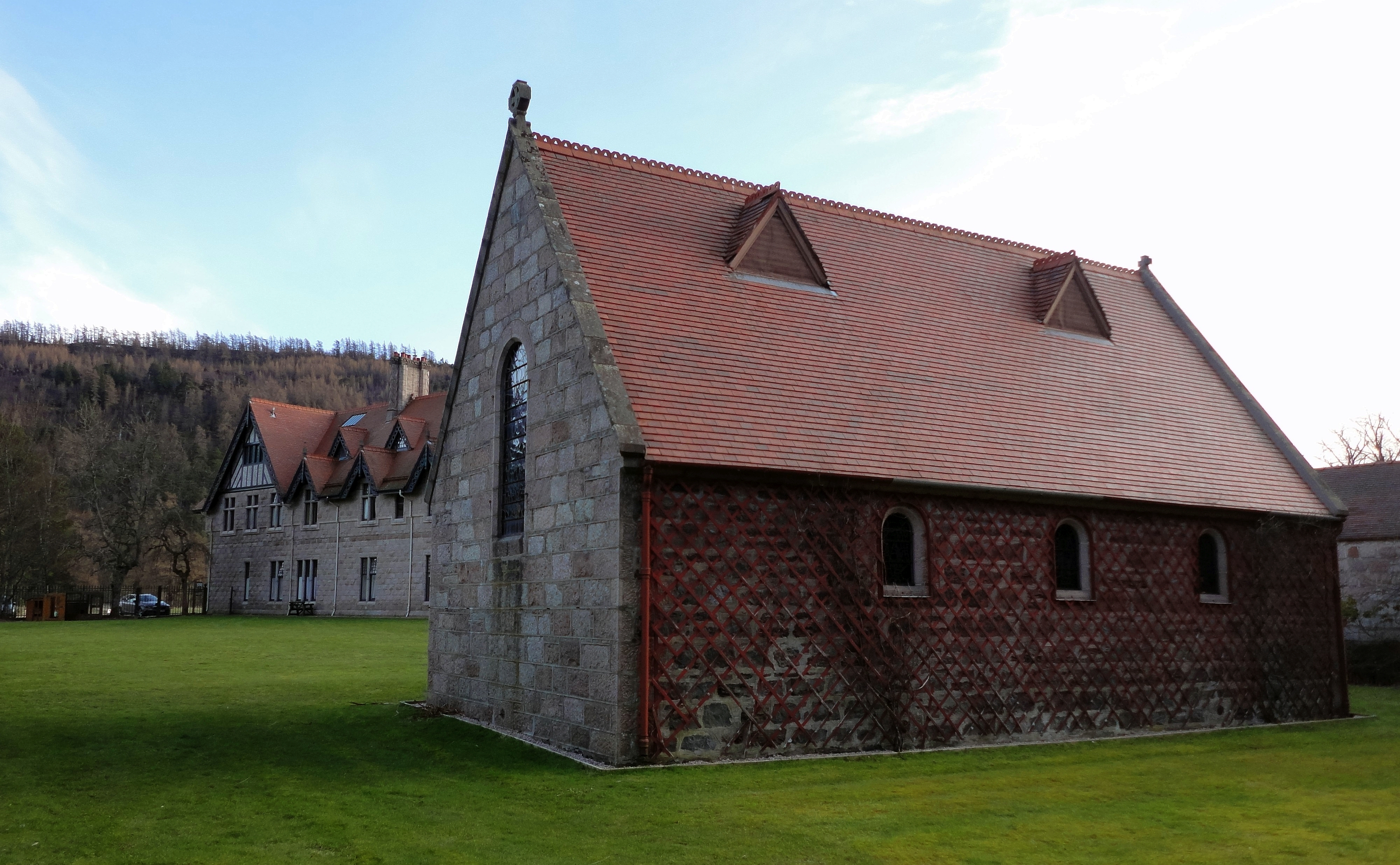
St Ninian's Chapel, north side looking east

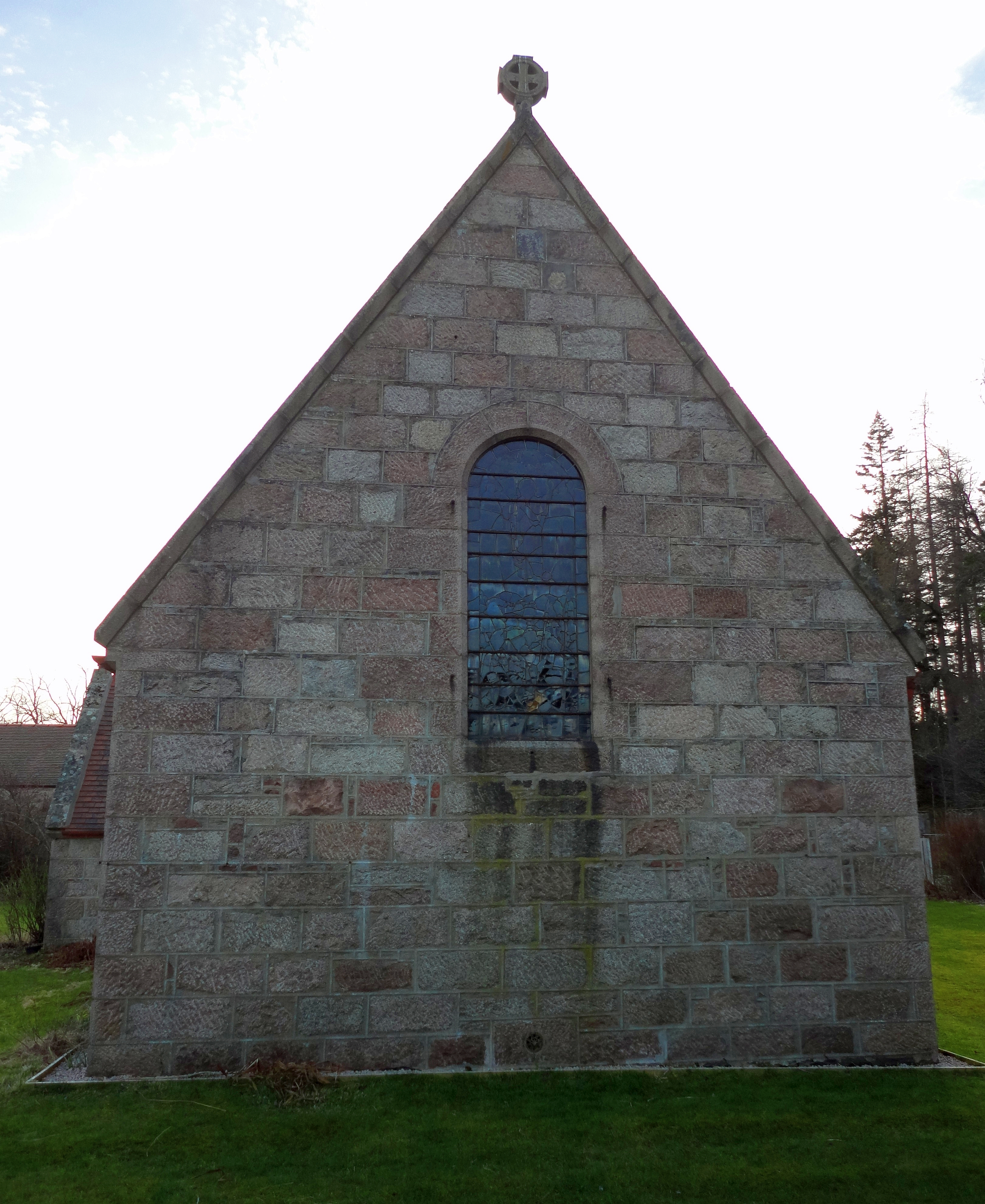
St Ninian's Chapel, east side

=== Interior ===
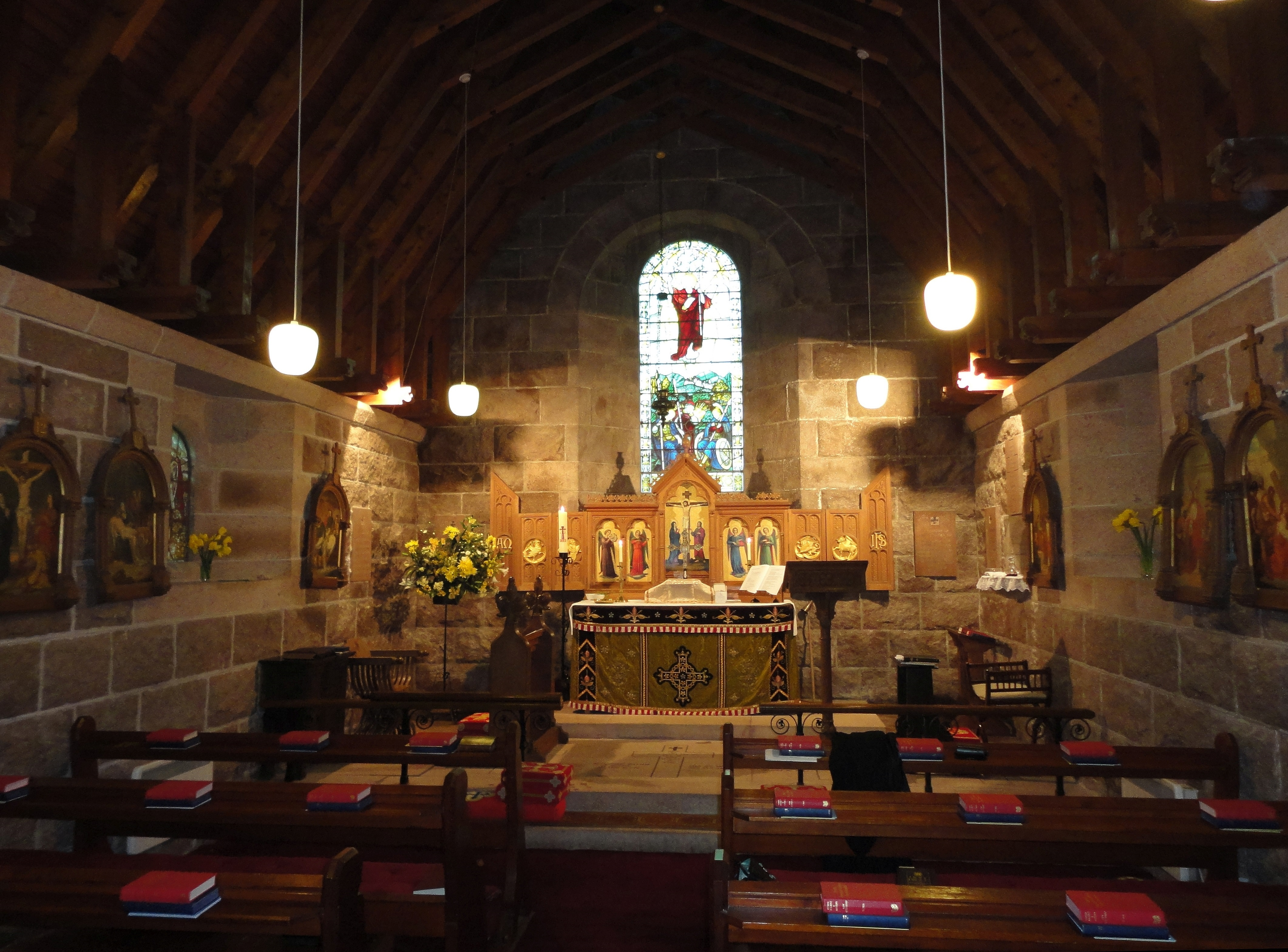
Interior of St Ninian's Chapel

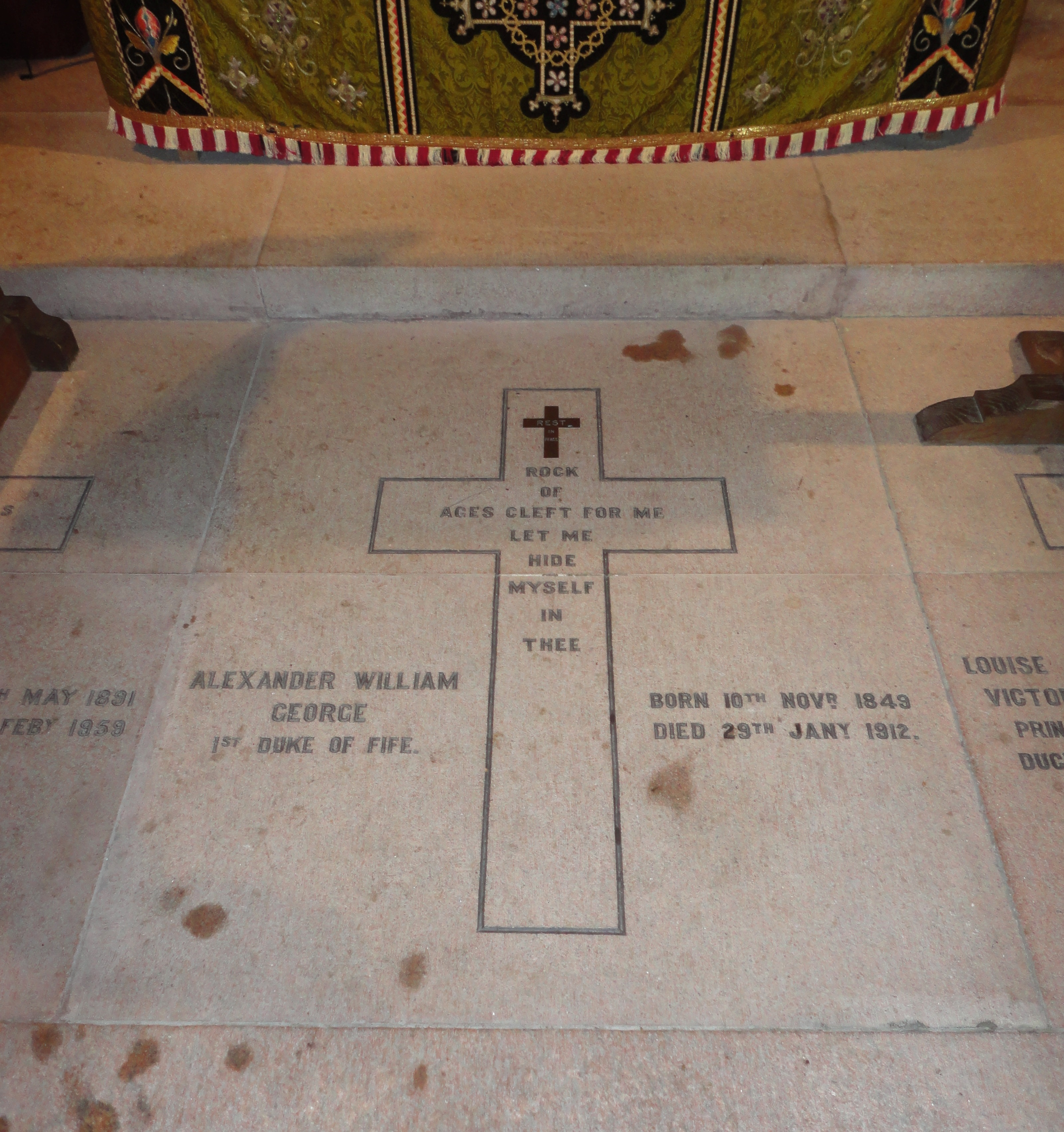
Floor of the chancel with graves

The interior of St Ninian's Chapel is small and intimate, with seating for approximately 40 people. The hammerbeam roof is exposed and visible from the nave. There are simple wooden pews in the nave, divided by a central aisle.

The chancel is stepped up from the nave and has a stone slab floor under which is the burial vault. The chancel has a small altar with a cover, with chancel rails in front. There is a wooden prayer stall and a reading desk and lectern. On the east wall behind the altar is a fine reredos with painted panels depicting angels and the Crucifixion. The crucifix is inscribed on the back: "For Mar Lodge Chapel from Alexandra Princess of Wales Xmas 1890." It is possible that the reredos and the altar frontal were designed by Charles Eamer Kempe.

== Features ==
=== Burials ===
In front of the altar is a burial vault covered with five slabs, each 2.50 feet (76.2 cm) wide. The first slab, set into the floor in between the left wall of the chapel and the altar, seems to form the access to the vault and is sealed with concrete (photo). The vault of St Ninian's Chapel is built of polished red granite; before it was sealed up for the first time after the burial of the 1st Duke of Fife, the estate servants and their families were invited to view the vault. There are four burials recorded there:

- Princess Alexandra, 2nd Duchess of Fife (1891–1959), daughter of the 1st Duke of Fife, wife of Prince Arthur of Connaught, and viceregal consort of South Africa. Her ashes were interred in St Ninian's Chapel; the second slab from the left bears her name.
- The 1st Duke of Fife (1849–1912). He died of pleurisy in Aswan, Egypt; his embalmed body was brought home in a lead coffin and first interred in St George's Chapel, Windsor Castle. His remains were removed to St Ninian's Chapel in August 1912; the middle slab bears his name.
- The Princess Royal, Duchess of Fife (1867–1931), wife of the 1st Duke of Fife. She died at her London residence at Portman Square in the presence of her daughters, Princess Arthur of Connaught, Duchess of Fife and Lady Maud Carnegie and was first buried in St George's Chapel, Windsor Castle. Her remains were later removed to St Ninian's Chapel; the second slab from the right bears her name.
- The 2nd Duke of Connaught and Strathearn, Earl of Macduff (1914–1943), son of the 2nd Duchess of Fife and Prince Arthur of Connaught. He died unmarried in Ottawa, Canada, and his ashes were interred in St Ninian's Chapel; the first slab from the right bears his name.
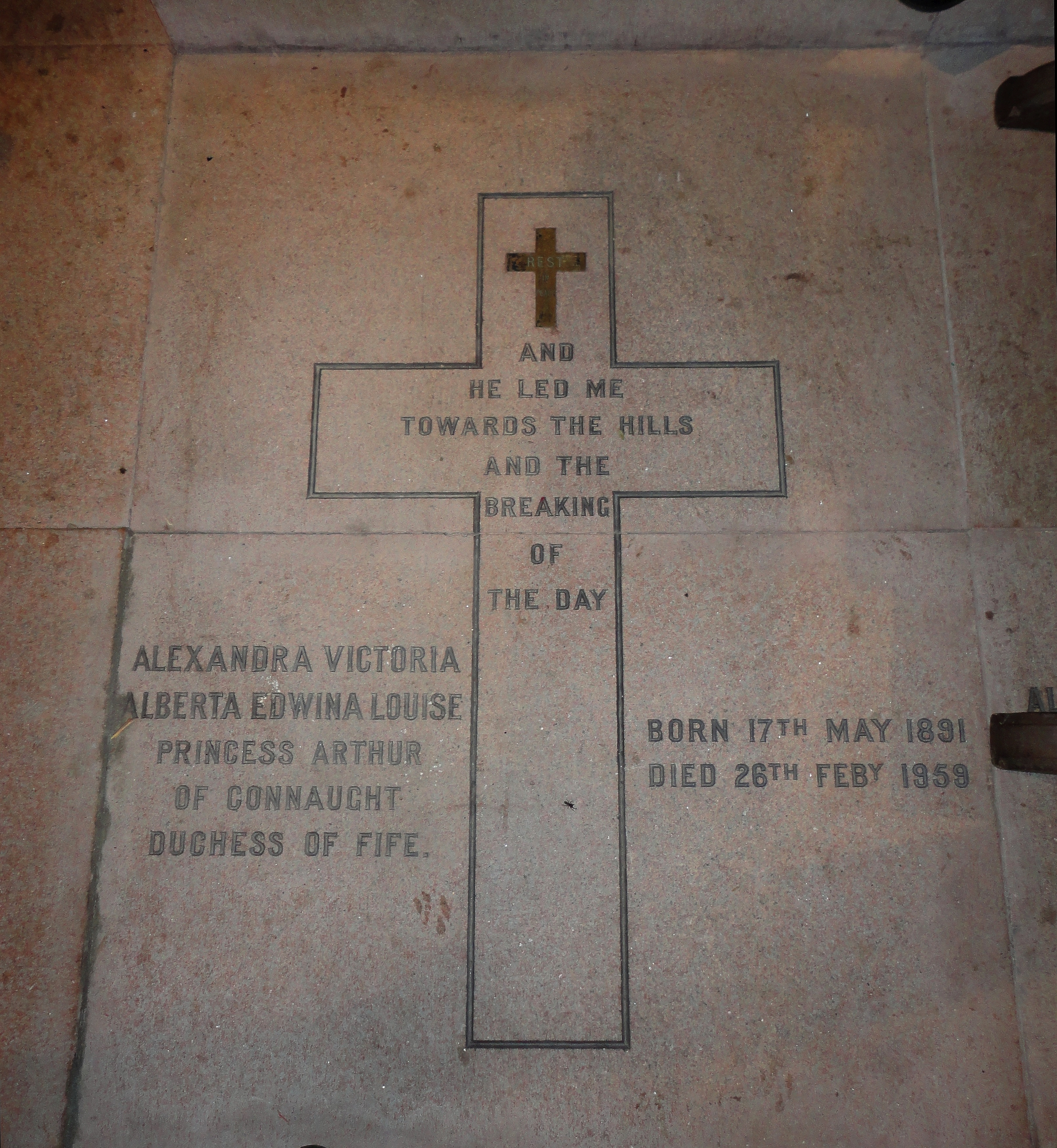
Grave of the 2nd Duchess of Fife, daughter of the 1st Duke

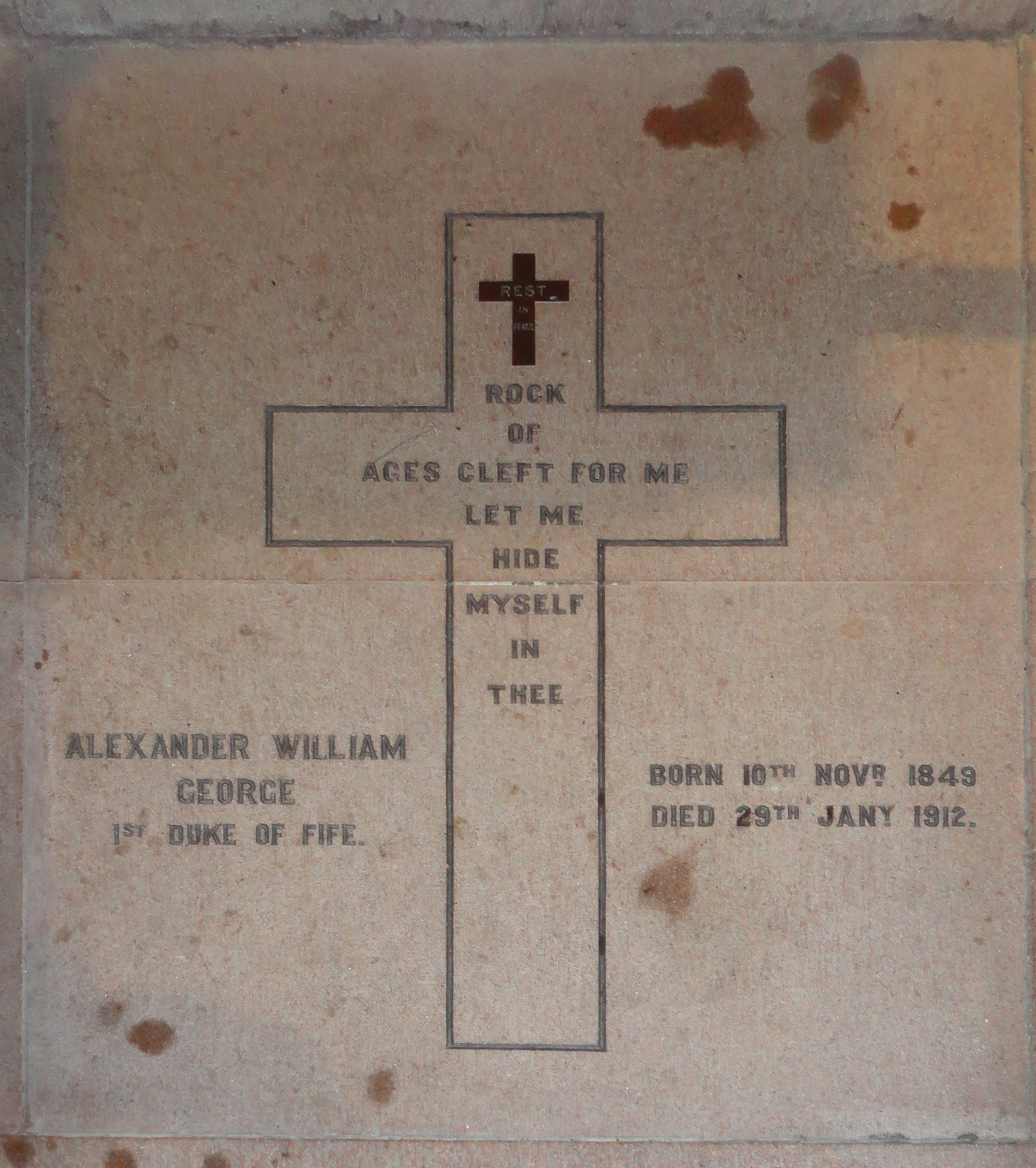
Grave of The 1st Duke of Fife

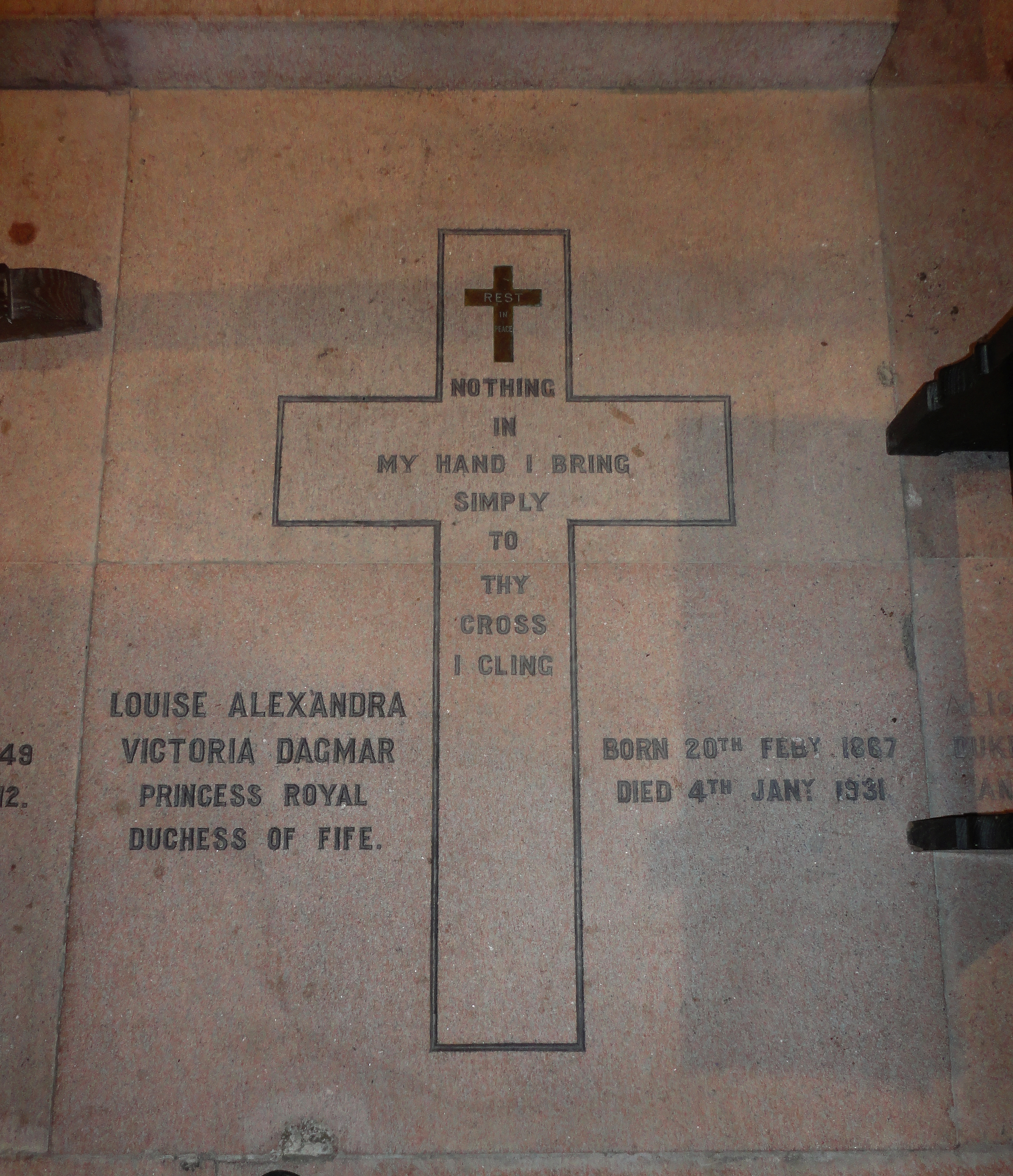
Grave of the Princess Royal, wife of the 1st Duke of Fife

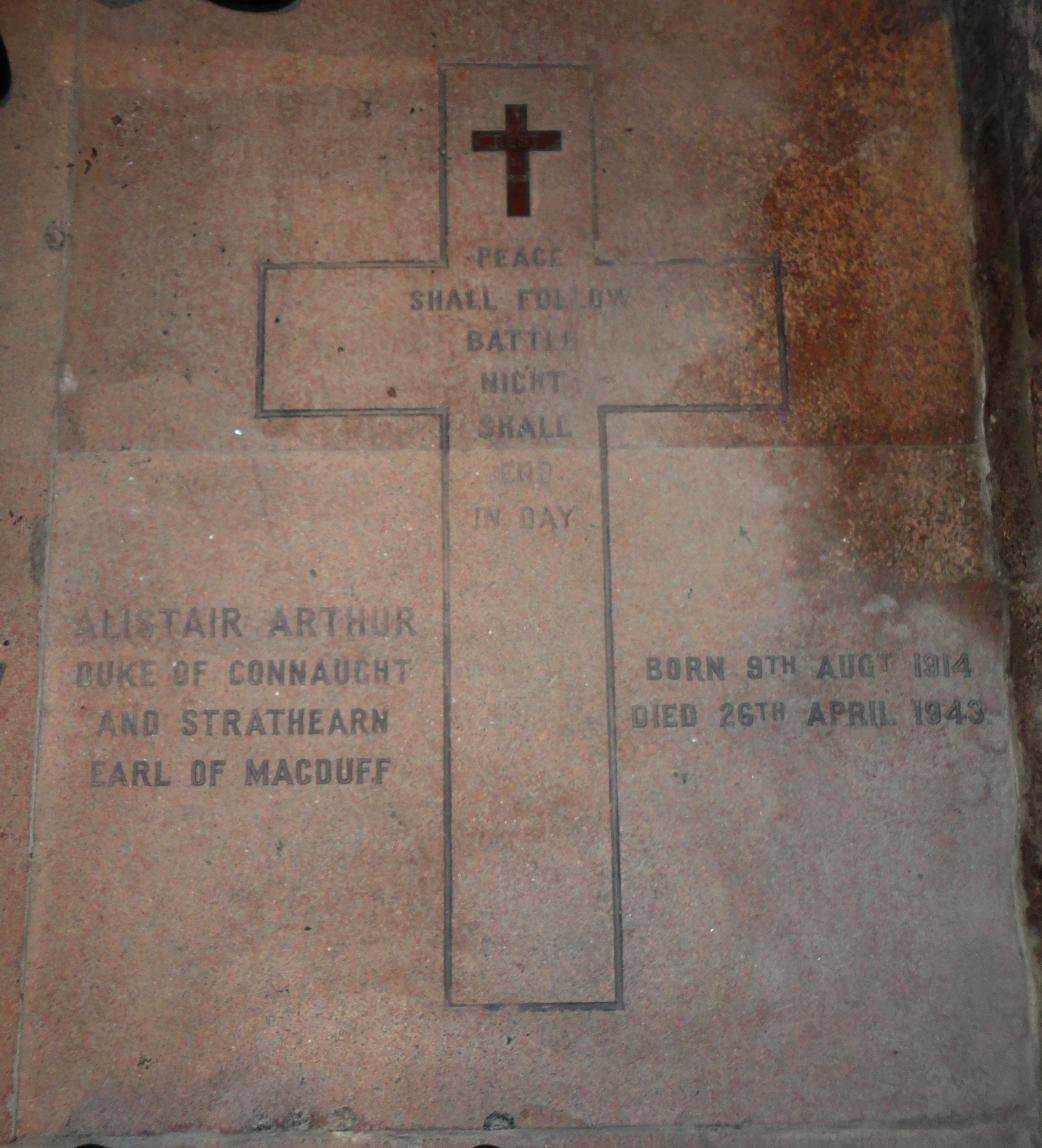
Grave of The 2nd Duke of Connaught and Strathearn, Earl of MacDuff, son of the 2nd Duchess of Fife

=== Monuments ===
Set into the walls of the chapel are eight inscriptions dedicated to the memory of the following:

- The Duke of Clarence KG, died 14 January 1892.
- King Edward VII, died 6 May 1910.
- Queen Alexandra, died 20 November 1925.
- Prince Arthur of Connaught KG, born 13 January 1883, died 12 September 1938.
- The 2nd Duke of Connaught and Strathearn, Earl of Macduff, born 9 August 1914, died 26 April 1943. (He has both an inscribed stone set in the wall and a floor slab marking his grave.)
- Maud Carnegie, Countess of Southesk, born 3 April 1893, died 14 December 1945.
- Charles H. Taylor, Secretary to the Duke of Fife and the Princess Royal.
- Ada Ellen Roberts, born 18 January 1876, died 6 May 1943.
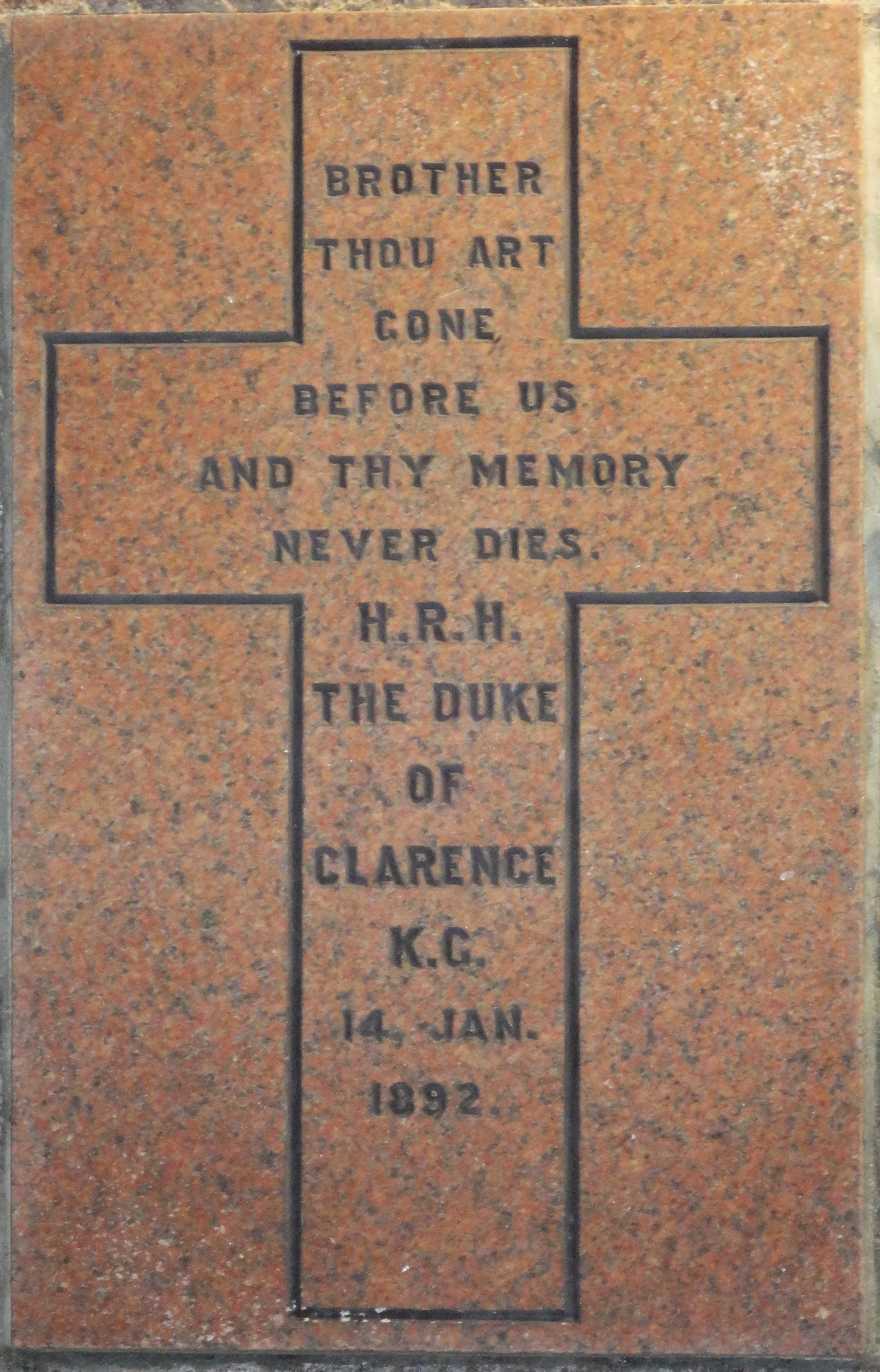
Wall-mounted plaque for The Duke of Clarence

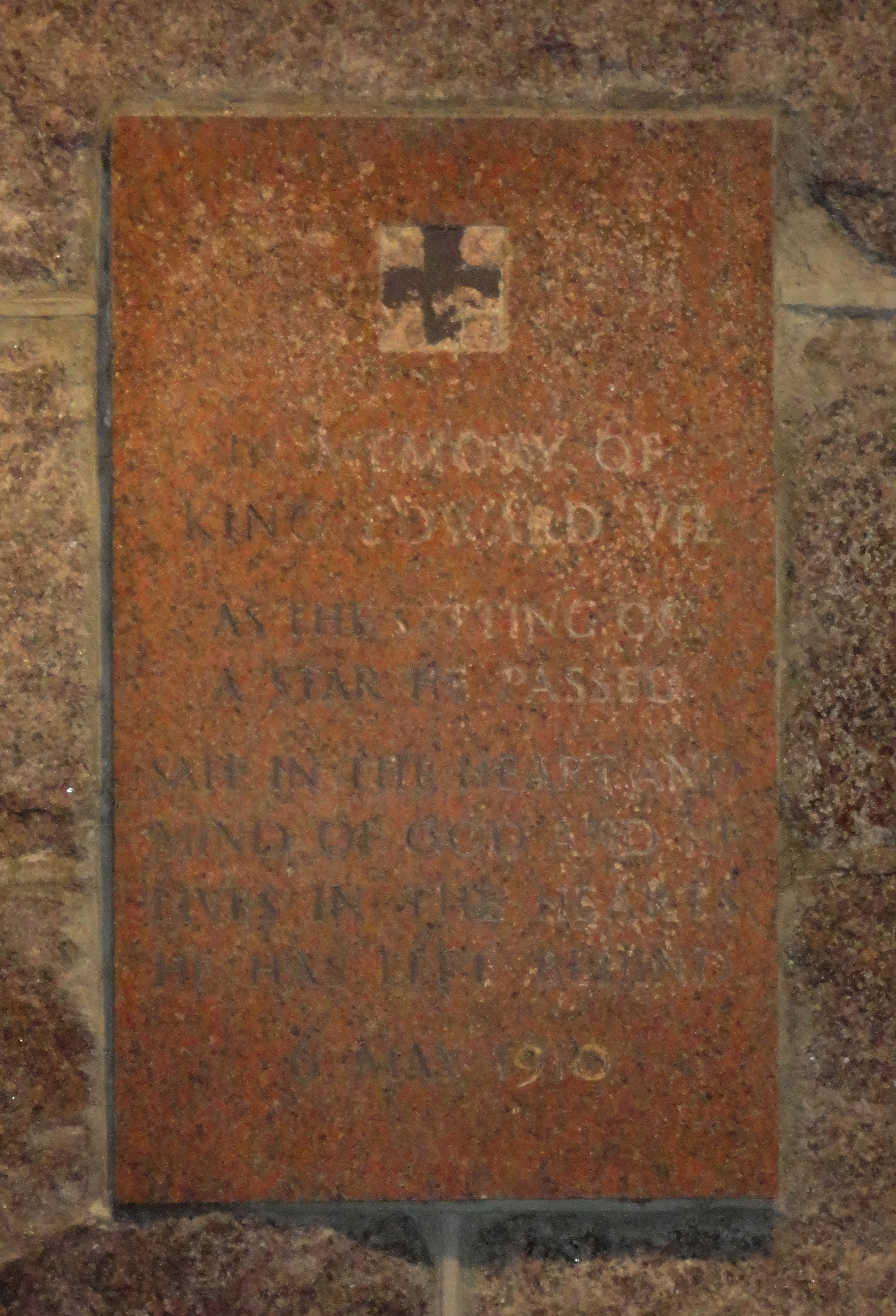
Wall-mounted plaque for King Edward VII

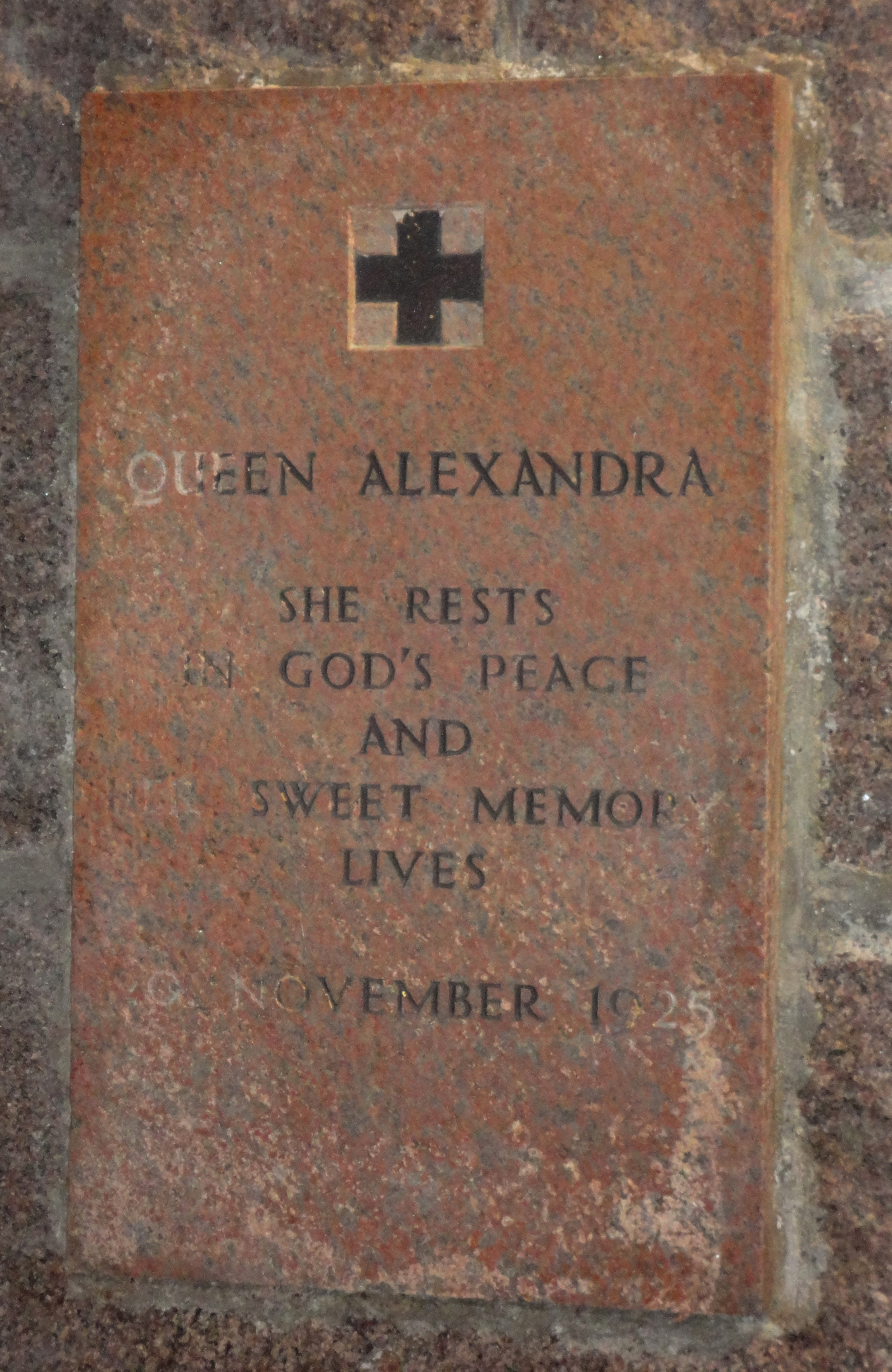
Wall-mounted plaque for Queen Alexandra

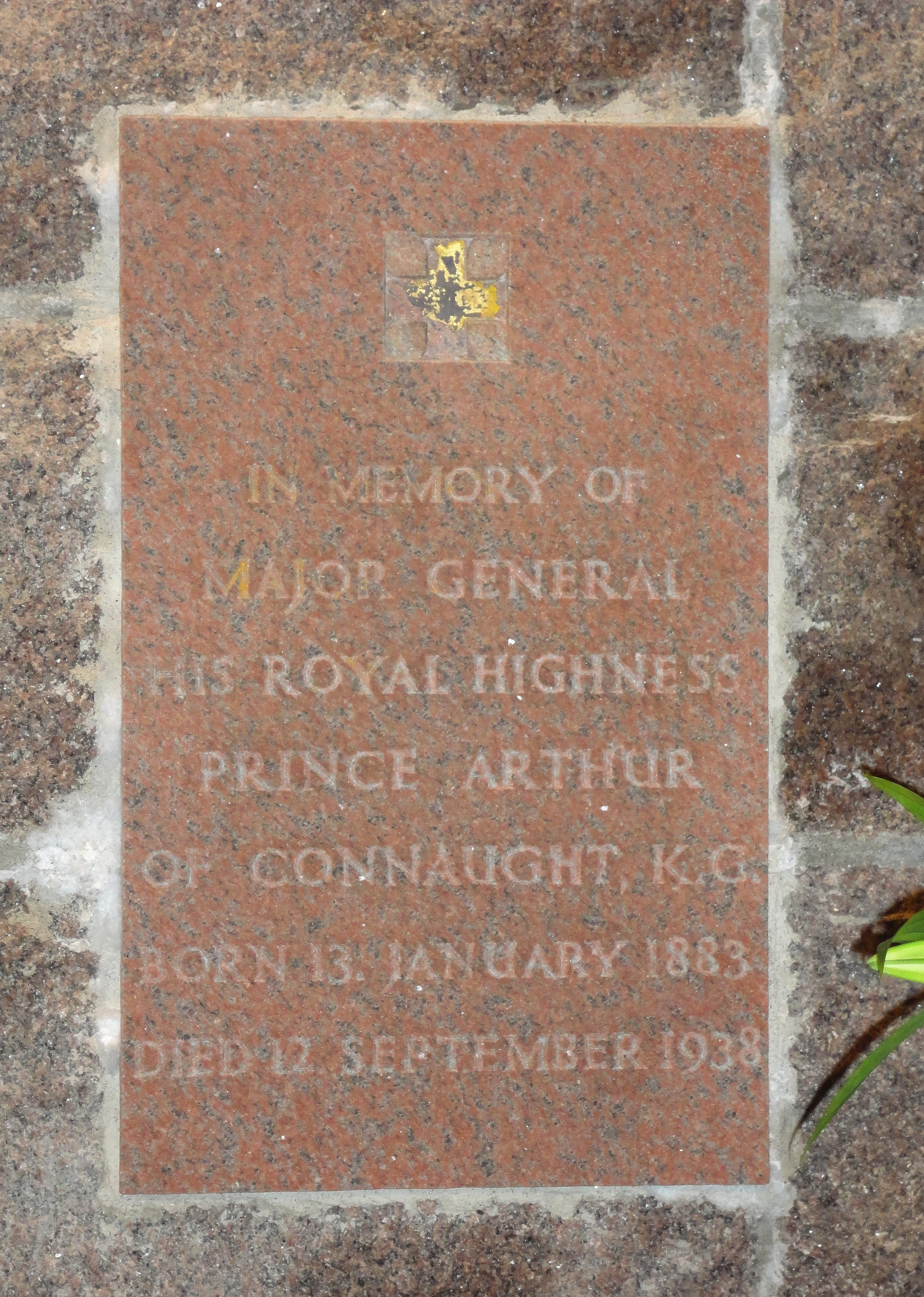
Wall-mounted plaque for Major General Prince Arthur of Connaught
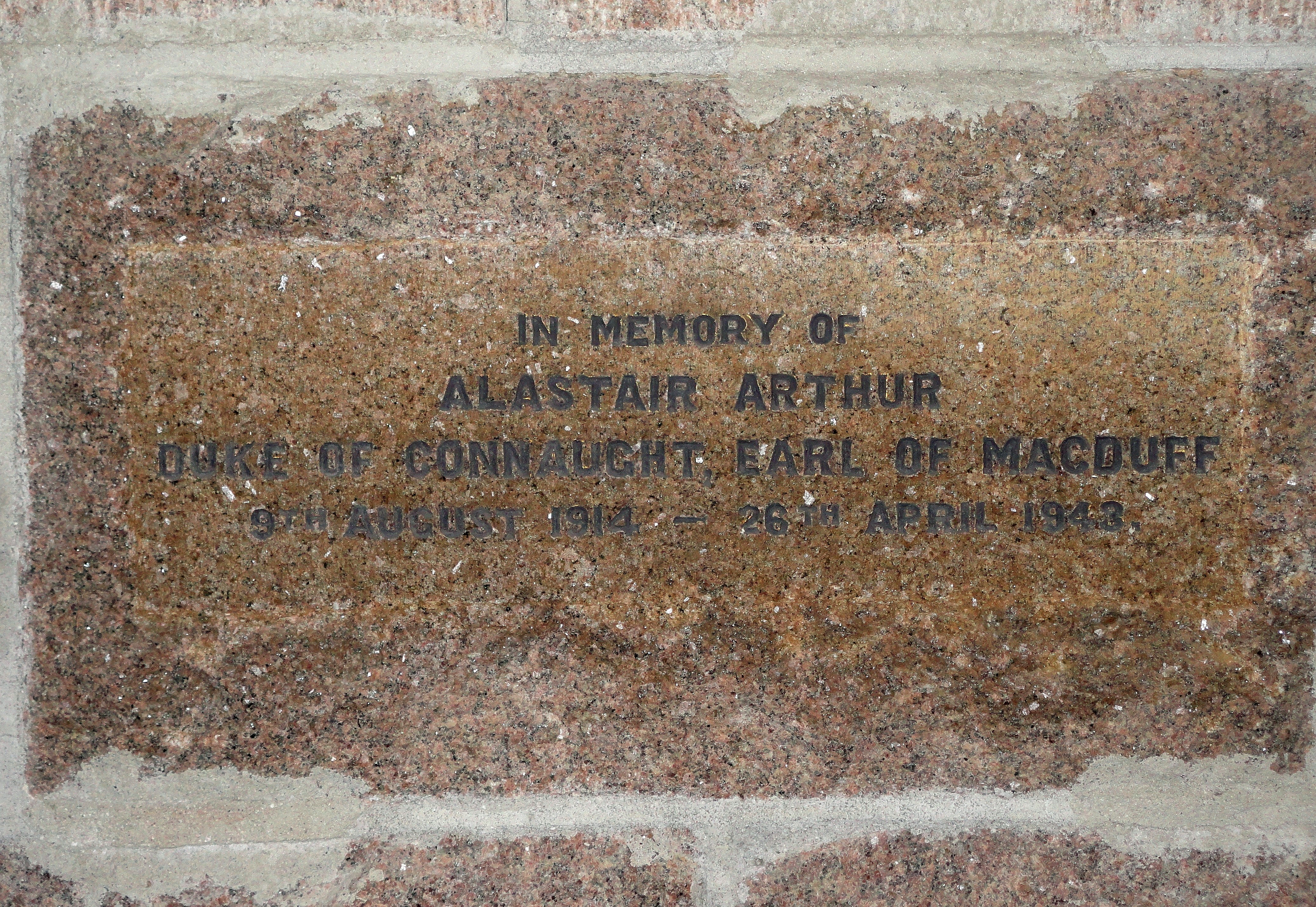
Inscribed stone for the 2nd Duke of Connaught, Earl of MacDuff

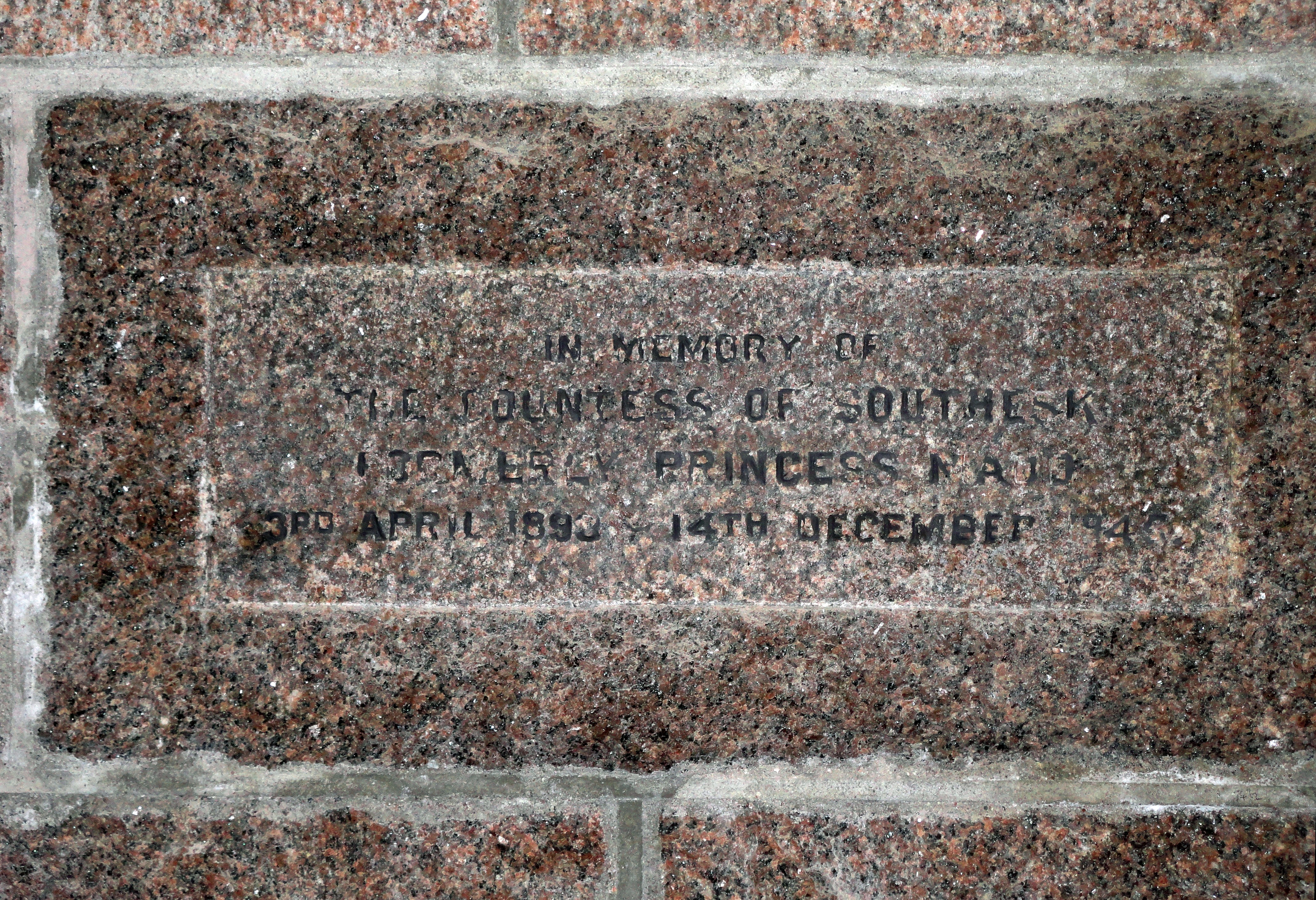
Inscribed stone for Princess Maud, Countess of Southesk

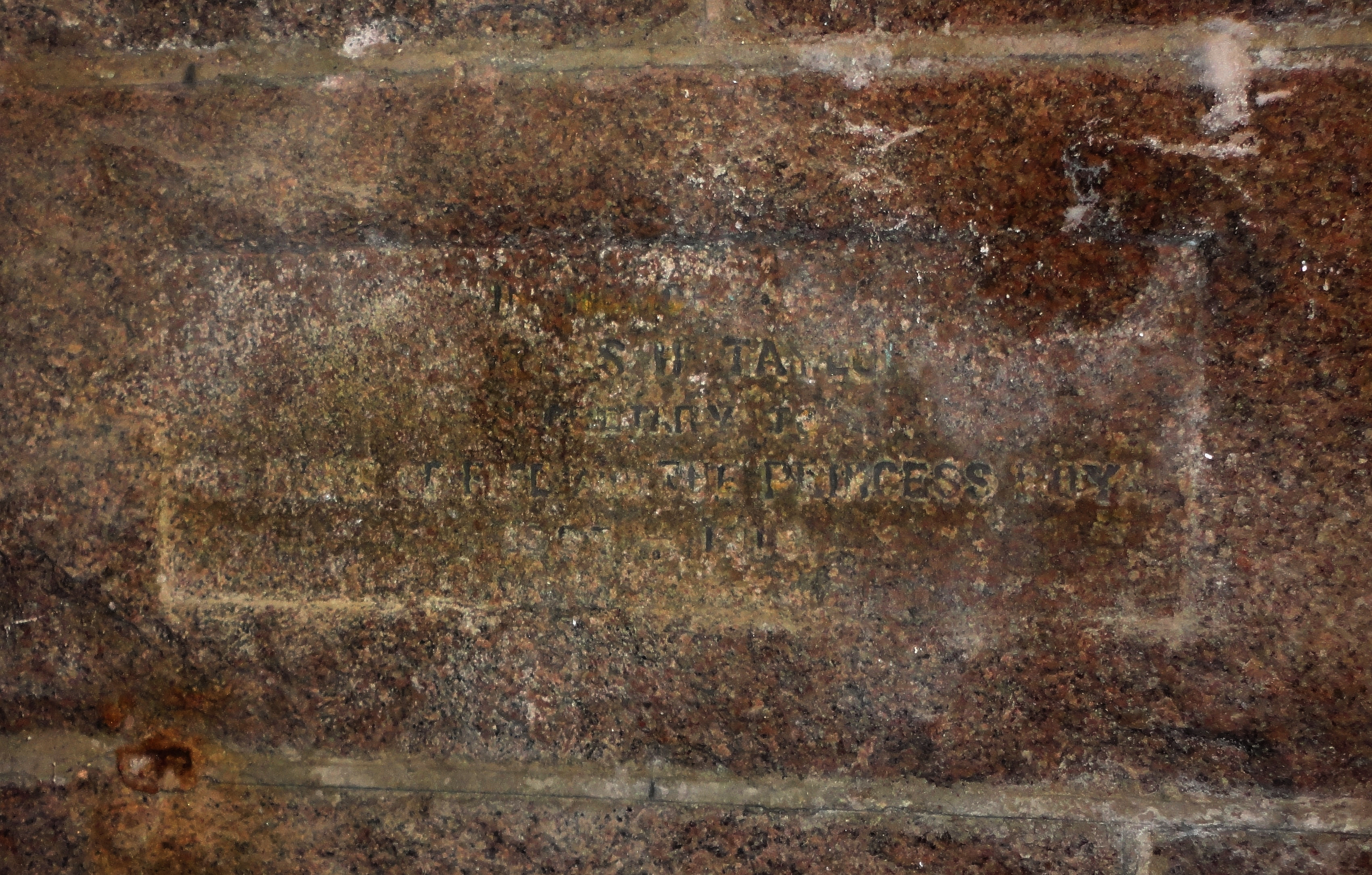
Inscribed stone for Charles H. Taylor

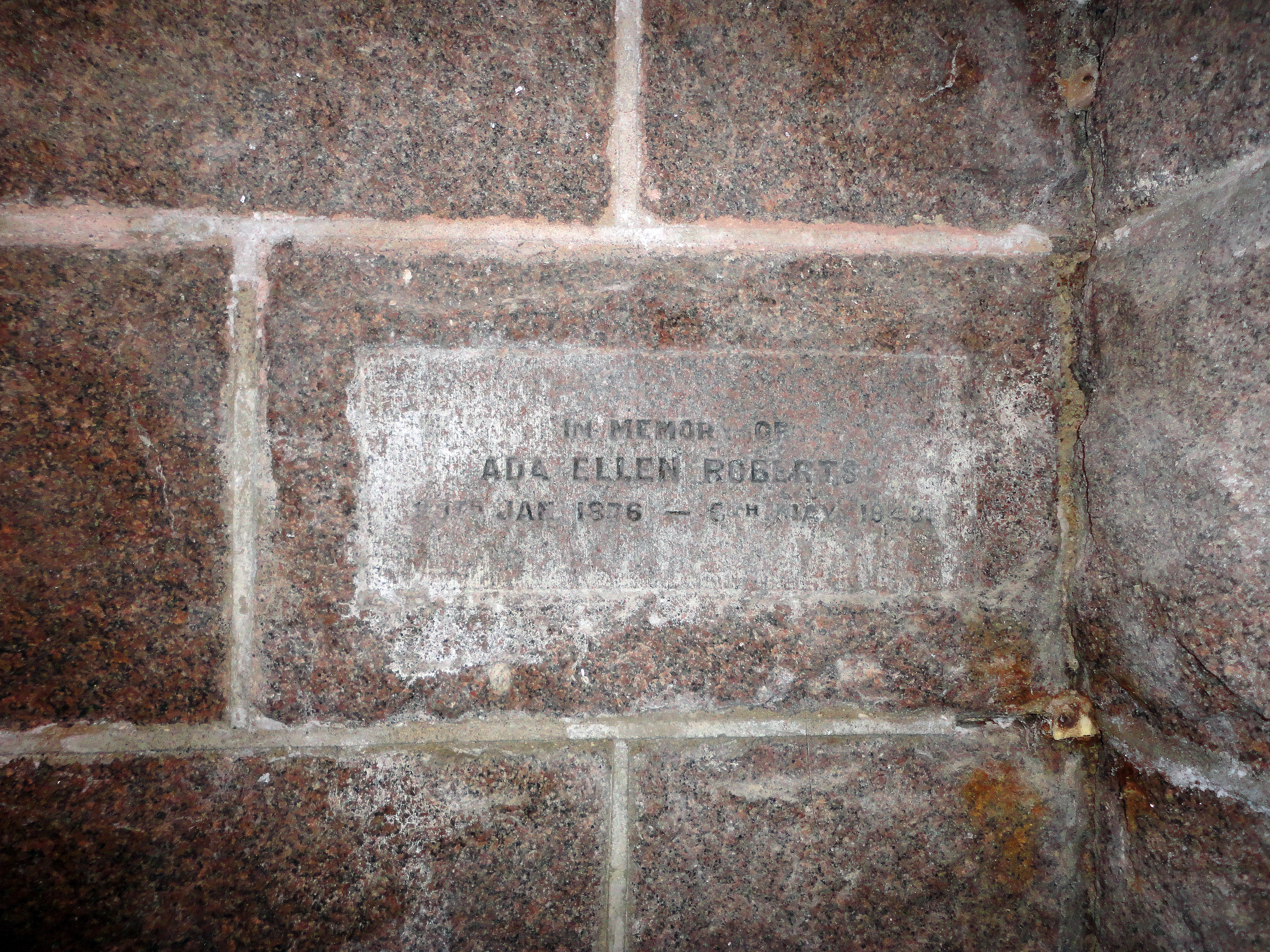
Inscribed stone for Ada Ellen Roberts

=== Stained glass ===
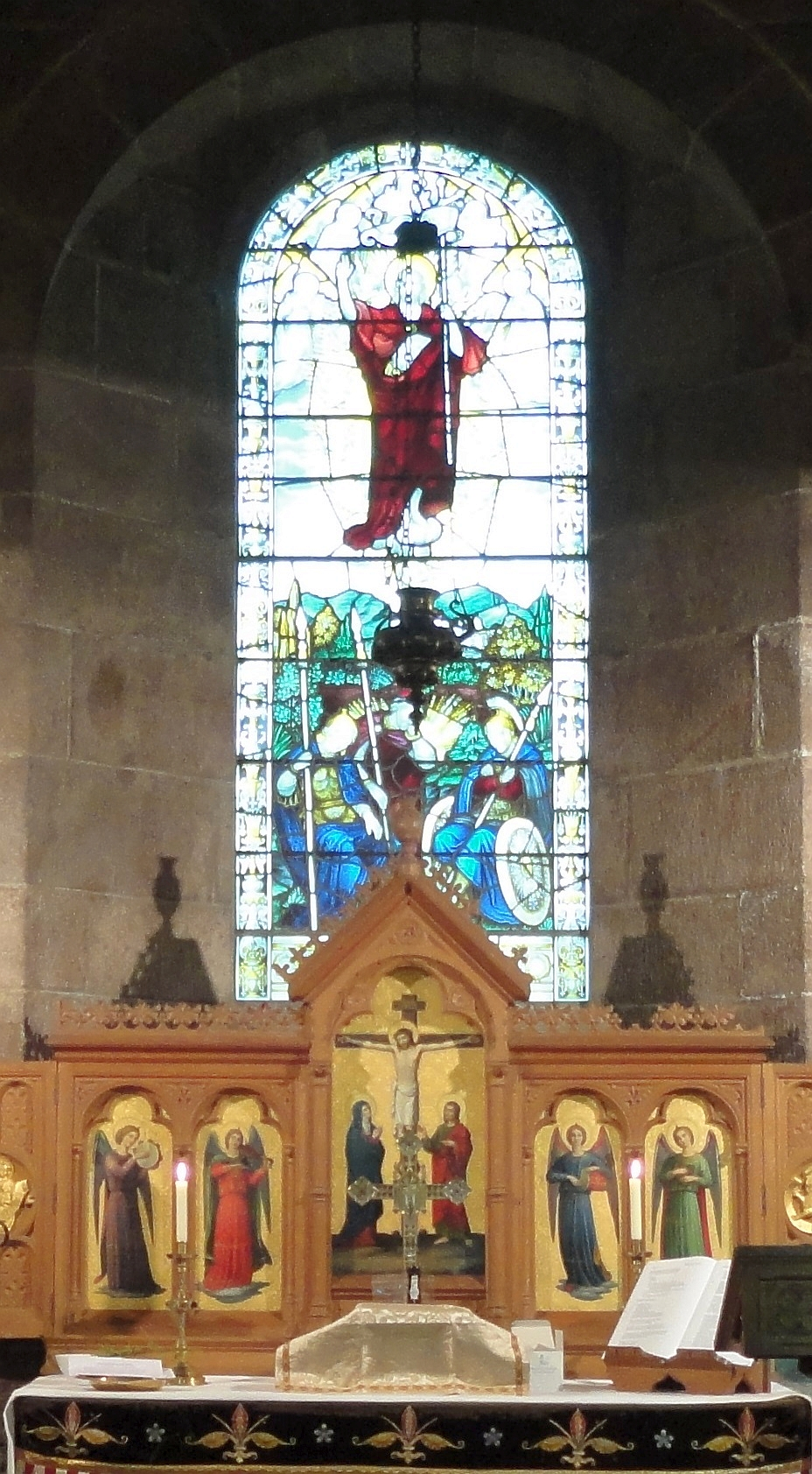
The east window behind the altar, depicting the Resurrection.

St Ninian's Chapel features a series of high-quality stained-glass windows, manufactured by Charles Eamer Kempe & Co Ltd, Millbrook Place, London. Kempe founded his studios in London in 1869, and later employed some hundred artists, designers and craftsmen. After his death in 1907, his studios became a limited company until they closed in 1934. The artist for the windows in St Ninian's was John William Lisle. All are single designs:

- The east window behind the altar depicts the Resurrection.
- The west window depicts St Michael slaying a dragon, with a small crucifixion scene beneath.
- The other windows (three in the north and two in the south) are smaller and depict angels with musical instruments.

The West window and one of the North windows bears the mark of Kempe and the artist Walter Tower, a wheatsheaf with a tower imposed. Details of the windows are held by the Archive of Art and Design at the Victoria and Albert Museum in London.

=== Stations of the Cross ===
There are fourteen painted Stations of the Cross.

=== Organ ===
St Ninian's Chapel does not have a pipe organ but a small harmonium.

== See also ==
- Places, place names, and structures on Mar Lodge Estate
