= Marquess Grey =

Marquessate in the Peerage of Great Britain

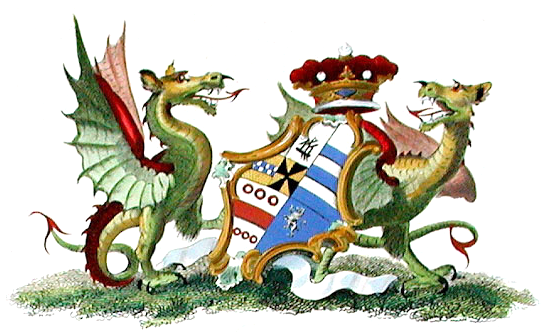
- Coat of arms of Jemima Campbell, 2nd Marchioness Grey
- Creation date: 19 May, 1740
- Creation: first
- Created by: George II of Great Britain
- Peerage: Peerage of Great Britain
- First holder: Henry Grey
- Last holder: Jemima Campbell
- Remainder to: Heirs Male of the 1st Marquess's body; in Default of such issue, to Jemima Campbell and the Heirs Male of the Body of the said Jemima Campbell.
- Status: Extinct

Marquess Grey was a title in the Peerage of Great Britain it was created on 19 May 1740 for Henry Grey, 1st Duke of Kent, with remainder to the male issue of his body and in default thereof to his granddaughter, the Honourable Jemima Campbell, and the heirs male of her body. The Duke of Kent died only two weeks after the creation of the marquessate, at which point the dukedom and most of its subsidiary titles became extinct (see Duke of Kent).

He was succeeded in the barony of Lucas (which could be passed on through female lines) and in the marquessate of Grey according to the special remainder by his granddaughter Jemima, who became the second Marchioness Grey. She was the daughter of John Campbell, Lord Glenorchy, later 3rd Earl of Breadalbane and Holland, and Lady Amabel Grey (died 1726), eldest daughter of the Duke of Kent. On 22 May 1740, three days after the marquessate was created, she married the Honourable Philip Yorke, later 2nd Earl of Hardwicke. They had two daughters, Lady Amabel Yorke and Lady Mary Yorke.

Lady Grey died in January 1797, aged 73. As she had no sons, the marquessate died with her. However, she was succeeded in the barony of Lucas by her elder daughter, Lady Amabel, who in 1816 was created Countess de Grey in her own right (see Earl de Grey for further history of this title).

== Marquesses Grey (1740) ==
- Henry Grey, 1st Duke of Kent, 1st Marquess Grey (1671–1740)
- Jemima Yorke, 2nd Marchioness Grey (1722–1797)

== Family tree ==
Family tree of the Dukes, Marquesseses, and Earls of Kent, Dukes of Kent and Strathearn, and Dukes of Connaught and Strathearn, and other related titles

Earl of Kent (1st creation), 1020
Godwin, Earl of Wessex c. 1001–1053; 1st Earl of Kent	Herleva d. 1050
Earl of Kent (2nd creation), 1067
King Harold Godwinson c. 1022–1066	Leofwine Godwinson c. 1035–1066; 2nd Earl of Kent	King William I c. 1028–1087	Odo of Bayeux d. 1097; Earl of Kent
Earldom (1st creation) forfeit, 1066	Earldom (2nd creation) forfeit, 1088	Earl of Kent (3rd creation), 1141
William of Ypres c. 1090–1165; Earl of Kent
Earldom (3rd creation) forfeit, 1155	Earl of Kent (4th creation), 1227
Hubert de Burgh c. 1170–1243; Earl of Kent
King Edward I 1239–1307	Earldom (4th creation) extinct, 1243
King Edward II; 1284–1327
Earl of Kent (5th creation), 1321
King Edward III; 1312–1377	Edmund of Woodstock; 1301–1330; 1st Earl of Kent
Earldom (5th creation) attainted, 1330
Earldom (5th creation) restored, 1330	Baron Holand (2nd creation), 1353; Earl of Kent (6th creation), 1360
Edmund c. 1326–1331; 2nd Earl of Kent	John of Gaunt; 1340–1399; Duke of Lancaster	Edward the Black Prince; 1330–1376; Prince of Wales, Duke of Cornwall	Joan of Kent c. 1328–1385; Princess of Wales, 4th Countess of Kent suo jure 5th Baroness Wake of Liddell	Thomas Holland c. 1314–1360; 1st Earl of Kent, etc.	John; 1330–1352; 3rd Earl of Kent; 4th Baron Wake of Liddell
Earldom (5th creation) extinct, 1360
Elizabeth of Lancaster bef. 1363–1426	John Holland c. 1352–1400; Earl of Huntingdon, Duke of Exeter	Thomas Holland; 1350–1397; 2nd Earl of Kent, etc.
Constance Holland; 1387–1437	Thomas Holland; 1372–1400; 3rd Earl of Kent, etc. Duke of Surrey
Edmund Holland; 1383–1408; 4th Earl of Kent, etc.
Earl of Kent (7th creation), 1461	Earl of Kent (8th creation), 1465	Earldom (6th creation) extinct and Barony Holand (2nd creation) abeyant, 1408
William Neville c. 1405–1463; Earl of Kent; Baron Fauconberg jure uxoris	Edmund Grey; 1416–1490; 1st Earl of Kent; 4th Baron Grey de Ruthyn
Earldom (7th creation) extinct, 1463
Anne Woodville c. 1438–1489	George Grey c. 1460–1503; 2nd Earl of Kent; 5th Baron Grey de Ruthyn
Richard Grey; 1481–1524; 3rd Earl of Kent; 6th Baron Grey de Ruthyn	Anthony Grey	Henry Grey c. 1495–1562; 4th Earl of Kent; 7th Baron Grey de Ruthyn
George Grey	Henry Grey; 1520–1545
Anthony Grey; 1557–1643; 9th Earl of Kent	Reginald Grey d. 1573; 5th Earl of Kent; 8th Baron Grey de Ruthyn	Henry Grey; 1541–1615; 6th Earl of Kent; 9th Baron Grey de Ruthyn	Charles Grey c. 1545–1623; 7th Earl of Kent; 10th Baron Grey de Ruthyn
Henry Grey; 1594–1651; 10th Earl of Kent	Henry Grey c. 1583–1639; 8th Earl of Kent; 11th Baron Grey de Ruthyn
Baron Lucas (2nd creation), 1663
Mary (Lucas) Grey d. 1702; 1st Baroness Lucas of Crudwell	Anthony Grey; 1645–1702; 11th Earl of Kent
Marquess of Kent, Earl of Harold, and Viscount Goderich (1st creation), 1706; Duke of Kent (1st creation), 1710; Marquess Grey, 1740
Henry Grey; 1671–1740; Duke of Kent, etc., 1st Marquess Grey; 12th Earl of Kent; 2nd Baron Lucas of Crudwell
Earldom (8th creation), Marquessate, and Dukedom of Kent, Earldom of Harold, and Viscountcy Goderich (1st creation) extinct, 1740
Anthony Grey; 1695–1723; 3rd Baron Lucas, styled Earl of Harold	Amabel Grey
Jemima (Campbell) Yorke; 1723–1797; 2nd Marchioness Grey, 4th Baroness Lucas	King George III; 1738–1820
Marquessate Grey extinct, 1797
Earl de Grey, 1816 (not the same as Earl Grey)	Earl of Dublin (1st creation), 1766	Duke of Kent and Strathearn and Earl of Dublin (2nd creation), 1799	See also: Earl of Strathearn
Amabel Hume-Campbell; 1751–1833; 1st Countess de Grey	Mary Jemima Yorke; 1757–1830	Prince Henry Frederick; 1745–1790; Earl of Dublin	Prince Edward Augustus; 1767–1820; Duke of Kent and Strathearn, etc.
Earldom of Dublin (1st creation) extinct, 1790	Dukedom of Kent and Strathearn and Earldom of Dublin (2nd creation) extinct, 1820
Viscount Goderich (2nd creation), 1827; Earl of Ripon, 1833
Thomas Philip (Robinson) de Grey; 1781–1859; 2nd Earl de Grey	Frederick John Robinson; 1782–1859; 1st Earl of Ripon, etc.	Queen Victoria; 1819–1901
Marquess of Ripon, 1871	Earl of Dublin (3rd creation), 1849/1850	Earl of Kent (9th creation), 1866	Duke of Connaught and Strathearn, 1874
George Robinson; 1827–1909; 1st Marquess of Ripon, 2nd Earl of Ripon, etc., 3rd Earl de Grey, 4th Baron Grantham	Albert Edward, Prince of Wales; 1841–1910; Earl of Dublin later King Edward VII	Prince Alfred Ernest Albert; 1844–1900; Duke of Edinburgh, Duke of Saxe-Coburg and Gotha, Earl of Kent	Prince Arthur; 1850–1942; 1st Duke of Connaught and Strathearn
Earldom of Dublin merged in the Crown, 1901
(Frederick) Oliver Robinson; 1852–1923; 2nd Marquess of Ripon, 3rd Earl of Ripon, etc., 4th Earl de Grey, 5th Baron Grantham	King George V 1865–1936	Prince Arthur of Connaught; 1883–1938
Marquessate and Earldom of Ripon, Earldom de Grey, Viscountcy Goderich, and Barony Grantham extinct, 1923
Duke of Kent (2nd creation), Earl of St Andrews, and Baron Downpatrick, 1934
Prince George; 1902–1942; 1st Duke of Kent, etc.	Prince Alastair Arthur; 1914–1943; 2nd Duke of Connaught and Strathearn
Dukedom of Connaught and Strathearn extinct, 1943
Prince Edward b. 1935; 2nd Duke of Kent, etc.	7) Prince Michael of Kent b. 1942
1) George Philip Nicholas Windsor b. 1962 styled Earl of St Andrews and heir apparent to the dukedom of Kent	3) Nicholas Charles Edward Jonathan Windsor b. 1970	8) Frederick Michael George David Louis Windsor b. 1979
2) Edward Edmund Maximilian George Windsor b. 1988 styled Lord Downpatrick	4) Albert Louis Philip Edward Windsor b. 2007	5) Leopold Ernest Augustus Guelph Windsor b. 2009	6) Louis Arthur Nicholas Felix Windsor b. 2014

== See also ==
- Duke of Kent
- Earl de Grey
- Baron Lucas
