= Marquess of Ripon =

Title in British Peerage

- Arms of the Marquesses of Ripon Blazon Arms: Vert a chevron between three stags at gaze or. Crest: Out of a coronet composed of fleurs-de-lis a mount vert thereon a stag at gaze gold. Supporters: On either side a greyhound reguardant sable. Motto: Qualis ab incepto (The same as from the beginning).
- Creation date: 1871
- Created by: Victoria
- Peerage: Peerage of the United Kingdom
- First holder: George Robinson, 2nd Earl of Ripon
- Last holder: Frederick Robinson, 2nd Marquess of Ripon
- Subsidiary titles: Earl de Grey; Earl of Ripon; Viscount Goderich; Baron Grantham; Baronet, of Newby
- Status: Extinct
- Extinction date: 23 September 1923
- Former seats: Newby Hall; Wrest Park; Studley Royal Park

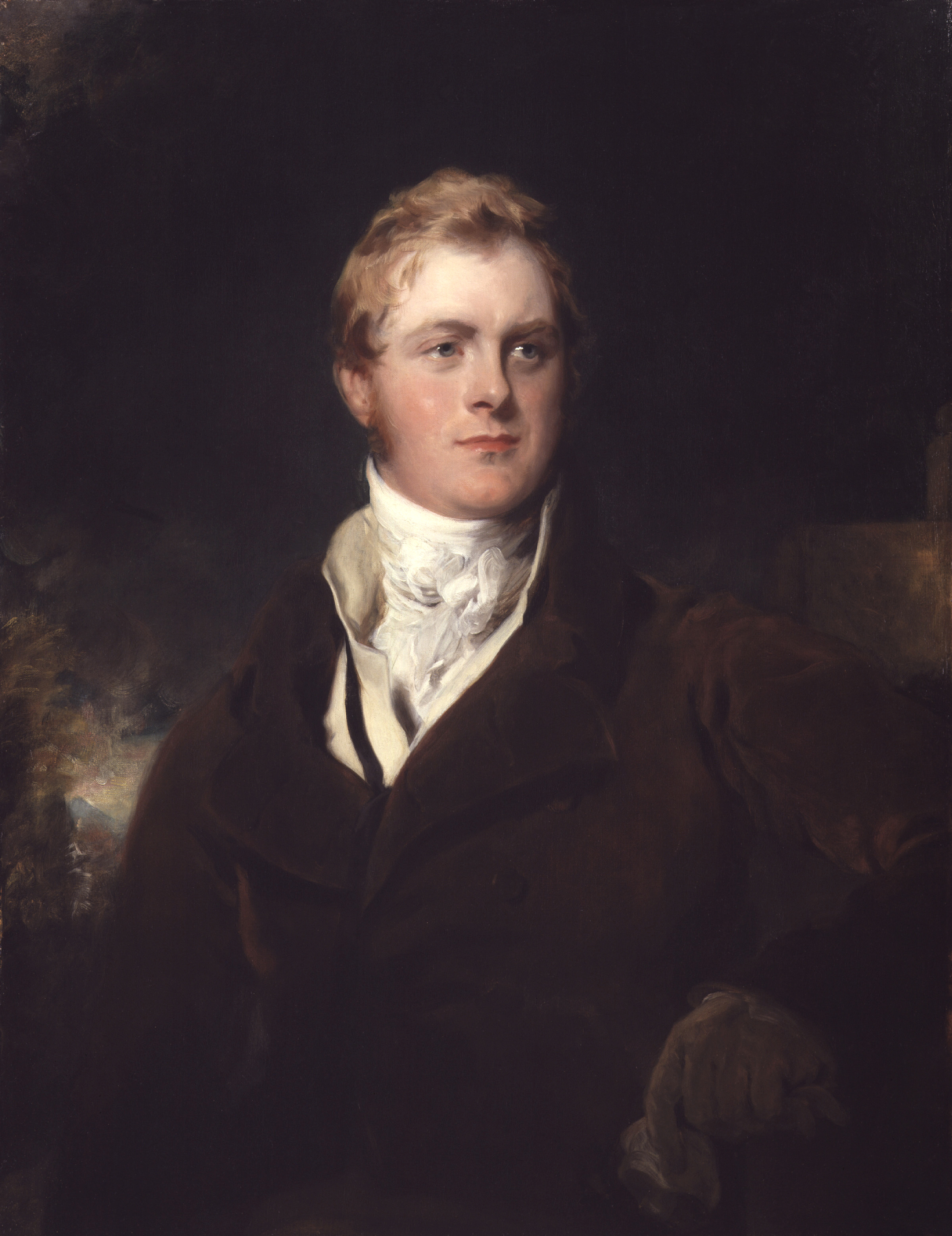
F. J. Robinson, 1st Earl of Ripon, portrait by Sir Thomas Lawrence

Marquess of Ripon, in the County of York, was a title in the Peerage of the United Kingdom. It was created in 1871 for the Liberal politician George Robinson, 2nd Earl of Ripon.

== History ==
The Robinson family descended from William Robinson (d. 1616), a wealthy York merchant, Lord Mayor and Member of Parliament for York. His grandson Sir William Robinson also represented York in Parliament and served as High Sheriff of Yorkshire in 1638. Sir William's elder son Metcalfe Robinson sat as Member of Parliament for York and was created a Baronet in 1660 (see Robinson Baronets). He died childless in 1689 when the baronetcy became extinct. The title was revived in the following year when his nephew William Robinson was created a Baronet, of Newby in the County of York, in the Baronetage of England. Sir William represented both Northallerton and York in Parliament. His eldest son Metcalfe, the second Baronet, only survived him by four days and was succeeded by his younger brother, Tancred, the third Baronet. He was a Rear-Admiral in the Royal Navy. This line of the family failed on the death of his younger son, the fifth Baronet, in 1792.

The late Baronet was succeeded by his first cousin once removed, Thomas Robinson, 3rd Baron Grantham, who became the sixth Baronet. He was the grandson of Thomas Robinson (fourth son of the first Baronet), a prominent diplomat and politician who served as Ambassador to the Austrian Empire, as Secretary of State for the Southern Department and as Leader of the House of Commons; in 1761 he was created Baron Grantham, of Grantham in the County of Lincoln, in the Peerage of Great Britain. He was succeeded by his eldest son, the second Baron, who was also a successful diplomat and politician who served as Ambassador to Spain and as Foreign Secretary. Lord Grantham married Lady Mary Jemima, daughter of Philip Yorke, 2nd Earl of Hardwicke, and Jemima Yorke, 2nd Marchioness Grey and 4th Baroness Lucas, granddaughter of Henry Grey, 1st Duke of Kent.

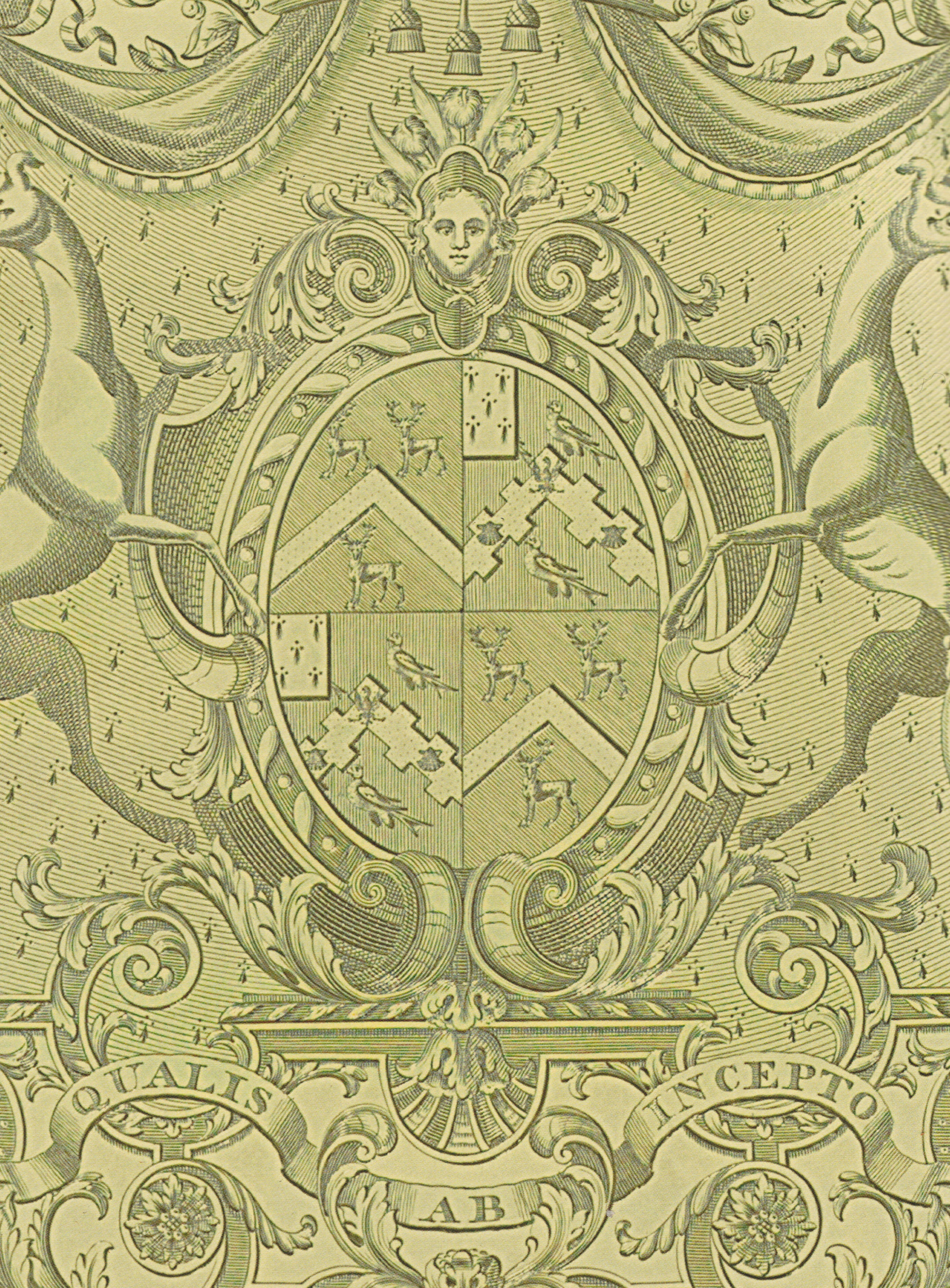
Central part of an engraved escutcheon Robinson quartering Weddell, for 3rd Lord Grantham, on silver gilt, with marks for Robert Garrard, London and 1802.

He was succeeded by his elder son Thomas, the aforementioned third Baron Grantham. In 1803 Thomas assumed the surname of Weddell in lieu of his patronymic. In 1833 he succeeded his maternal aunt as 2nd Earl de Grey and 6th Baron Lucas. His aunt Lady Amabel (or Annabella) Yorke had succeeded her mother the Marchioness Grey (on whose death the marquessate became extinct) in the barony of Lucas in 1797 and in 1816 she was created Countess de Grey, of Wrest in the County of Bedford, in the Peerage of the United Kingdom, with remainder to her sister Lady Mary Jemima and the heirs male of her body. Lady de Grey was the childless widow of Alexander Hume-Campbell, Lord Polwarth, son of Hugh Hume-Campbell, 3rd Earl of Marchmont. Thomas, the second Earl de Grey, also inherited the Grey family seat of Wrest Park, near Silsoe in Bedfordshire. The same year he succeeded to the earldom, he assumed by Royal licence the surname of de Grey in lieu of Weddell.

Lord de Grey had no sons and was succeeded in the barony of Lucas (which could be passed on through female lines) by his daughter, Anne (see Baron Lucas for further history of this title). He was succeeded in the other titles by his nephew, George Robinson, 2nd Earl of Ripon. He was the only son of the Honourable F. J. Robinson, second son of the second Baron Grantham. F. J. Robinson was Chancellor of the Exchequer between 1823 and 1827, and he served briefly as Prime Minister of the United Kingdom between August 1827 and January 1828. In 1827 he was elevated to the Peerage of the United Kingdom as Viscount Goderich, of Nocton in the County of Lincoln. This was a revival of the viscountcy of Goderich created for his great-great-grandfather the Duke of Kent in 1706. In 1833 Robinson was further honoured when he was made Earl of Ripon, in the County of Kent in the Peerage of the United Kingdom. On his death in 1859 he was succeeded by his only son, the aforementioned second Earl of Ripon. The latter also succeeded his uncle in the earldom of de Grey later in 1859, whereby he became known by the style of "Earl de Grey and Ripon". He was a distinguished Liberal statesman and held office in every Liberal administration from 1861 until his death in 1908. In 1871 he was created Marquess of Ripon, in the County of York in the Peerage of the United Kingdom. He was succeeded by his only son and only surviving child, the second Marquess. He represented Ripon in Parliament between 1874 and 1880. He was childless, therefore all the titles became extinct upon his death in 1923. The second Marquess was regarded as the finest shot of his generation.

The family seats were Wrest Park in Bedfordshire, and Newby Hall and Studley Royal Park in Yorkshire

== Robinson Baronets, of Newby (1690) ==
- Sir William Robinson, 1st Baronet (1655–1736)
- Sir Metcalfe Robinson, 2nd Baronet (c. 1683–1736)
- Sir Tancred Robinson, 3rd Baronet (c. 1685–1754)
- Sir William Robinson, 4th Baronet (1713–1770)
- Sir Norton Robinson, 5th Baronet (c. 1715–1792)
- Thomas Philip Robinson, 3rd Baron Grantham (1781–1859)

== Barons Grantham (1761) ==
- Thomas Robinson, 1st Baron Grantham (c. 1695–1770)
- Thomas Robinson, 2nd Baron Grantham (1738–1786)
- Thomas Philip Robinson, 3rd Baron Grantham (1781–1859) (succeeded as 2nd Earl de Grey in 1833)

== Earls de Grey (1816) ==
- Amabel Yorke, 1st Countess de Grey (1751–1833)
- Thomas Philip de Grey, 2nd Earl de Grey (1781–1859)
- George Frederick Samuel Robinson, 3rd Earl de Grey, 1st Marquess of Ripon (1827–1909)

== Viscount Goderich (1827) ==
- Frederick John Robinson, 1st Viscount Goderich; created Earl of Ripon in 1833 (1782–1859)

== Earls of Ripon (1833) ==
- Frederick John Robinson, 1st Earl of Ripon (1782–1859)
- George Frederick Samuel Robinson, 2nd Earl of Ripon (1827–1909) (succeeded as 4th Baron Grantham and 3rd Earl de Grey in 1859; created Marquess of Ripon in 1871)

== Marquesses of Ripon (1871) ==
- George Frederick Samuel Robinson, 1st Marquess of Ripon (1827–1909)
- Frederick Oliver Robinson, 2nd Marquess of Ripon (1852–1923)

== Family tree ==
Family tree of the Dukes, Marquesseses, and Earls of Kent, Dukes of Kent and Strathearn, and Dukes of Connaught and Strathearn, and other related titles

Earl of Kent (1st creation), 1020
Godwin, Earl of Wessex c. 1001–1053; 1st Earl of Kent	Herleva d. 1050
Earl of Kent (2nd creation), 1067
King Harold Godwinson c. 1022–1066	Leofwine Godwinson c. 1035–1066; 2nd Earl of Kent	King William I c. 1028–1087	Odo of Bayeux d. 1097; Earl of Kent
Earldom (1st creation) forfeit, 1066	Earldom (2nd creation) forfeit, 1088	Earl of Kent (3rd creation), 1141
William of Ypres c. 1090–1165; Earl of Kent
Earldom (3rd creation) forfeit, 1155	Earl of Kent (4th creation), 1227
Hubert de Burgh c. 1170–1243; Earl of Kent
King Edward I 1239–1307	Earldom (4th creation) extinct, 1243
King Edward II; 1284–1327
Earl of Kent (5th creation), 1321
King Edward III; 1312–1377	Edmund of Woodstock; 1301–1330; 1st Earl of Kent
Earldom (5th creation) attainted, 1330
Earldom (5th creation) restored, 1330	Baron Holand (2nd creation), 1353; Earl of Kent (6th creation), 1360
Edmund c. 1326–1331; 2nd Earl of Kent	John of Gaunt; 1340–1399; Duke of Lancaster	Edward the Black Prince; 1330–1376; Prince of Wales, Duke of Cornwall	Joan of Kent c. 1328–1385; Princess of Wales, 4th Countess of Kent suo jure 5th Baroness Wake of Liddell	Thomas Holland c. 1314–1360; 1st Earl of Kent, etc.	John; 1330–1352; 3rd Earl of Kent; 4th Baron Wake of Liddell
Earldom (5th creation) extinct, 1360
Elizabeth of Lancaster bef. 1363–1426	John Holland c. 1352–1400; Earl of Huntingdon, Duke of Exeter	Thomas Holland; 1350–1397; 2nd Earl of Kent, etc.
Constance Holland; 1387–1437	Thomas Holland; 1372–1400; 3rd Earl of Kent, etc. Duke of Surrey
Edmund Holland; 1383–1408; 4th Earl of Kent, etc.
Earl of Kent (7th creation), 1461	Earl of Kent (8th creation), 1465	Earldom (6th creation) extinct and Barony Holand (2nd creation) abeyant, 1408
William Neville c. 1405–1463; Earl of Kent; Baron Fauconberg jure uxoris	Edmund Grey; 1416–1490; 1st Earl of Kent; 4th Baron Grey de Ruthyn
Earldom (7th creation) extinct, 1463
Anne Woodville c. 1438–1489	George Grey c. 1460–1503; 2nd Earl of Kent; 5th Baron Grey de Ruthyn
Richard Grey; 1481–1524; 3rd Earl of Kent; 6th Baron Grey de Ruthyn	Anthony Grey	Henry Grey c. 1495–1562; 4th Earl of Kent; 7th Baron Grey de Ruthyn
George Grey	Henry Grey; 1520–1545
Anthony Grey; 1557–1643; 9th Earl of Kent	Reginald Grey d. 1573; 5th Earl of Kent; 8th Baron Grey de Ruthyn	Henry Grey; 1541–1615; 6th Earl of Kent; 9th Baron Grey de Ruthyn	Charles Grey c. 1545–1623; 7th Earl of Kent; 10th Baron Grey de Ruthyn
Henry Grey; 1594–1651; 10th Earl of Kent	Henry Grey c. 1583–1639; 8th Earl of Kent; 11th Baron Grey de Ruthyn
Baron Lucas (2nd creation), 1663
Mary (Lucas) Grey d. 1702; 1st Baroness Lucas of Crudwell	Anthony Grey; 1645–1702; 11th Earl of Kent
Marquess of Kent, Earl of Harold, and Viscount Goderich (1st creation), 1706; Duke of Kent (1st creation), 1710; Marquess Grey, 1740
Henry Grey; 1671–1740; Duke of Kent, etc., 1st Marquess Grey; 12th Earl of Kent; 2nd Baron Lucas of Crudwell
Earldom (8th creation), Marquessate, and Dukedom of Kent, Earldom of Harold, and Viscountcy Goderich (1st creation) extinct, 1740
Anthony Grey; 1695–1723; 3rd Baron Lucas, styled Earl of Harold	Amabel Grey
Jemima (Campbell) Yorke; 1723–1797; 2nd Marchioness Grey, 4th Baroness Lucas	King George III; 1738–1820
Marquessate Grey extinct, 1797
Earl de Grey, 1816 (not the same as Earl Grey)	Earl of Dublin (1st creation), 1766	Duke of Kent and Strathearn and Earl of Dublin (2nd creation), 1799	See also: Earl of Strathearn
Amabel Hume-Campbell; 1751–1833; 1st Countess de Grey	Mary Jemima Yorke; 1757–1830	Prince Henry Frederick; 1745–1790; Earl of Dublin	Prince Edward Augustus; 1767–1820; Duke of Kent and Strathearn, etc.
Earldom of Dublin (1st creation) extinct, 1790	Dukedom of Kent and Strathearn and Earldom of Dublin (2nd creation) extinct, 1820
Viscount Goderich (2nd creation), 1827; Earl of Ripon, 1833
Thomas Philip (Robinson) de Grey; 1781–1859; 2nd Earl de Grey	Frederick John Robinson; 1782–1859; 1st Earl of Ripon, etc.	Queen Victoria; 1819–1901
Marquess of Ripon, 1871	Earl of Dublin (3rd creation), 1849/1850	Earl of Kent (9th creation), 1866	Duke of Connaught and Strathearn, 1874
George Robinson; 1827–1909; 1st Marquess of Ripon, 2nd Earl of Ripon, etc., 3rd Earl de Grey, 4th Baron Grantham	Albert Edward, Prince of Wales; 1841–1910; Earl of Dublin later King Edward VII	Prince Alfred Ernest Albert; 1844–1900; Duke of Edinburgh, Duke of Saxe-Coburg and Gotha, Earl of Kent	Prince Arthur; 1850–1942; 1st Duke of Connaught and Strathearn
Earldom of Dublin merged in the Crown, 1901
(Frederick) Oliver Robinson; 1852–1923; 2nd Marquess of Ripon, 3rd Earl of Ripon, etc., 4th Earl de Grey, 5th Baron Grantham	King George V 1865–1936	Prince Arthur of Connaught; 1883–1938
Marquessate and Earldom of Ripon, Earldom de Grey, Viscountcy Goderich, and Barony Grantham extinct, 1923
Duke of Kent (2nd creation), Earl of St Andrews, and Baron Downpatrick, 1934
Prince George; 1902–1942; 1st Duke of Kent, etc.	Prince Alastair Arthur; 1914–1943; 2nd Duke of Connaught and Strathearn
Dukedom of Connaught and Strathearn extinct, 1943
Prince Edward b. 1935; 2nd Duke of Kent, etc.	7) Prince Michael of Kent b. 1942
1) George Philip Nicholas Windsor b. 1962 styled Earl of St Andrews and heir apparent to the dukedom of Kent	3) Nicholas Charles Edward Jonathan Windsor b. 1970	8) Frederick Michael George David Louis Windsor b. 1979
2) Edward Edmund Maximilian George Windsor b. 1988 styled Lord Downpatrick	4) Albert Louis Philip Edward Windsor b. 2007	5) Leopold Ernest Augustus Guelph Windsor b. 2009	6) Louis Arthur Nicholas Felix Windsor b. 2014
