= 1st Viscount Goderich =

The Viscount Goderich is a title that has been created twice in British history. The first Viscount may refer to:

- Henry Grey, 1st Duke of Kent (1671–1740), additionally the Viscount Goderich, British politician and courtier
- F. J. Robinson, 1st Viscount Goderich (1782–1859), British statesman
