= Earl de Grey =

Extinct earldom in the Peerage of the United Kingdom

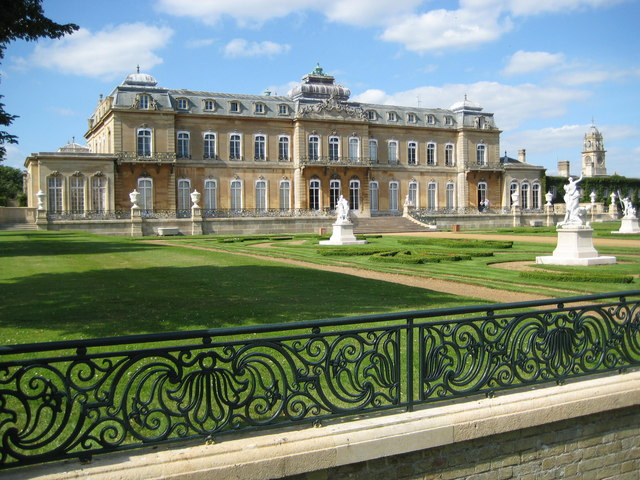
Wrest Park, Bedfordshire, the seat of the Grey family.

Earl de Grey, of Wrest in the County of Bedford, was a title in the Peerage of the United Kingdom.

== History ==
The title was created on 25 October 1816 (as Countess de Grey) for Amabell Hume-Campbell, Dowager Lady Polwarth and suo jure 5th Baroness Lucas, with remainder to the heirs male of her body, and in default of such issue to her sister Mary Jemima Robinson, Dowager Baroness Grantham, and the heirs male of her body. She was the elder daughter and co-heir of Philip Yorke, 2nd Earl of Hardwicke, and Jemima Campbell, 2nd Marchioness Grey (see Marquess Grey), eldest daughter of John Campbell, 3rd Earl of Breadalbane and Holland, and Lady Amabel Grey, eldest daughter of Henry Grey, 1st Duke of Kent (see Duke of Kent).

The marquessate of Grey had become extinct on her mother's death in 1797, and when the Grey title was revived in favour of her daughter, the style "de Grey" was used to distinguish it from the earldom of Grey, which had been created in 1806; the Grey family was extremely distantly related to the Earls Grey. The Countess de Grey was the widow of Alexander Hume-Campbell, Lord Polwarth, eldest son of Hugh Hume, 3rd Earl of Marchmont.

The Countess de Grey was childless, and she was succeeded in the barony of Lucas according to the normal descent of that title and in the earldom of de Grey according to the special remainder by her nephew, Thomas Robinson, 3rd Baron Grantham, who assumed the surname of de Grey on succeeding to the title. Lord de Grey was the eldest son of Thomas Robinson, 2nd Baron Grantham, and the aforementioned Mary Jemima Robinson, Dowager Baroness Grantham (died 1830), sister of the Countess de Grey (see Marquess of Ripon for earlier history of the Robinson family).

He died in 1859 and was succeeded in the barony of Lucas (which could be passed on through female lines) by his eldest daughter Lady Anne (see Baron Lucas for further history of this title) and in the earldom of de Grey (which could only be passed on through male lines) by his nephew, George Robinson, 2nd Earl of Ripon, only son of F. J. Robinson, 1st Earl of Ripon, the former prime minister better known as Lord Goderich. On succeeding to the earldom of de Grey, Lord Ripon styled himself "Earl de Grey and Ripon". In 1871, he was created Marquess of Ripon, whereafter Earl de Grey became the courtesy title used by the heir apparent to the marquessate. Ripon was succeeded by his son and only surviving child, Frederick Robinson, 2nd Marquess of Ripon. The second Marquess was childless, and on his death in 1923, the marquessate and earldom of de Grey and all other titles became extinct.

== Earls de Grey (1816) ==
- Amabel Hume-Campbell, 1st Countess de Grey (1751–1833)
- Thomas Philip de Grey, 2nd Earl De Grey, 3rd Baron Grantham (1781–1859)
- George Frederick Samuel Robinson, 1st Marquess of Ripon, 3rd Earl de Grey (1827–1909)
- Frederick Oliver Robinson, 2nd Marquess of Ripon, 4th Earl de Grey (1852–1923)

== Countess de Grey ==
Countess de Grey is a courtesy title normally used by wives of Earl de Grey. However, the first person given the title was a woman, so she is Countess de Grey in her own right.

=== Countess de Grey (suo jure) ===
Countess	Portrait	Birth	Marriage	Death
Amabel Yorke		23 January 1751	Alexander Hume-Campbell, Lord Polwarth; 17 August 1780	4 March 1833

=== Countess de Grey (by marriage) ===
Person	Name	Birth	Marriage	Became Countess de Grey	Husband	Change of title	Died
	Henrietta Frances Cole	22 June 1784	20 July 1805	4 March 1833	Thomas de Grey, 2nd Earl de Grey	2 July 1848	
	Henrietta Vyner	17 April 1833	8 April 1851	14 November 1859	George Robinson, 3rd Earl de Grey	28 February 1907	
	Gwladys Herbert	22 April 1859	7 May 1885	9 July 1909	Oliver Robinson, 4rd Earl de Grey	28 October 1917	

== See also ==
- Duke of Kent (1710 creation)
- Marquess Grey
- Baron Lucas
- Marquess of Ripon
