= Mary Jemima Yorke, Baroness Grantham =

British peeress (1757–1830)

The Right Honourable The Baroness Grantham
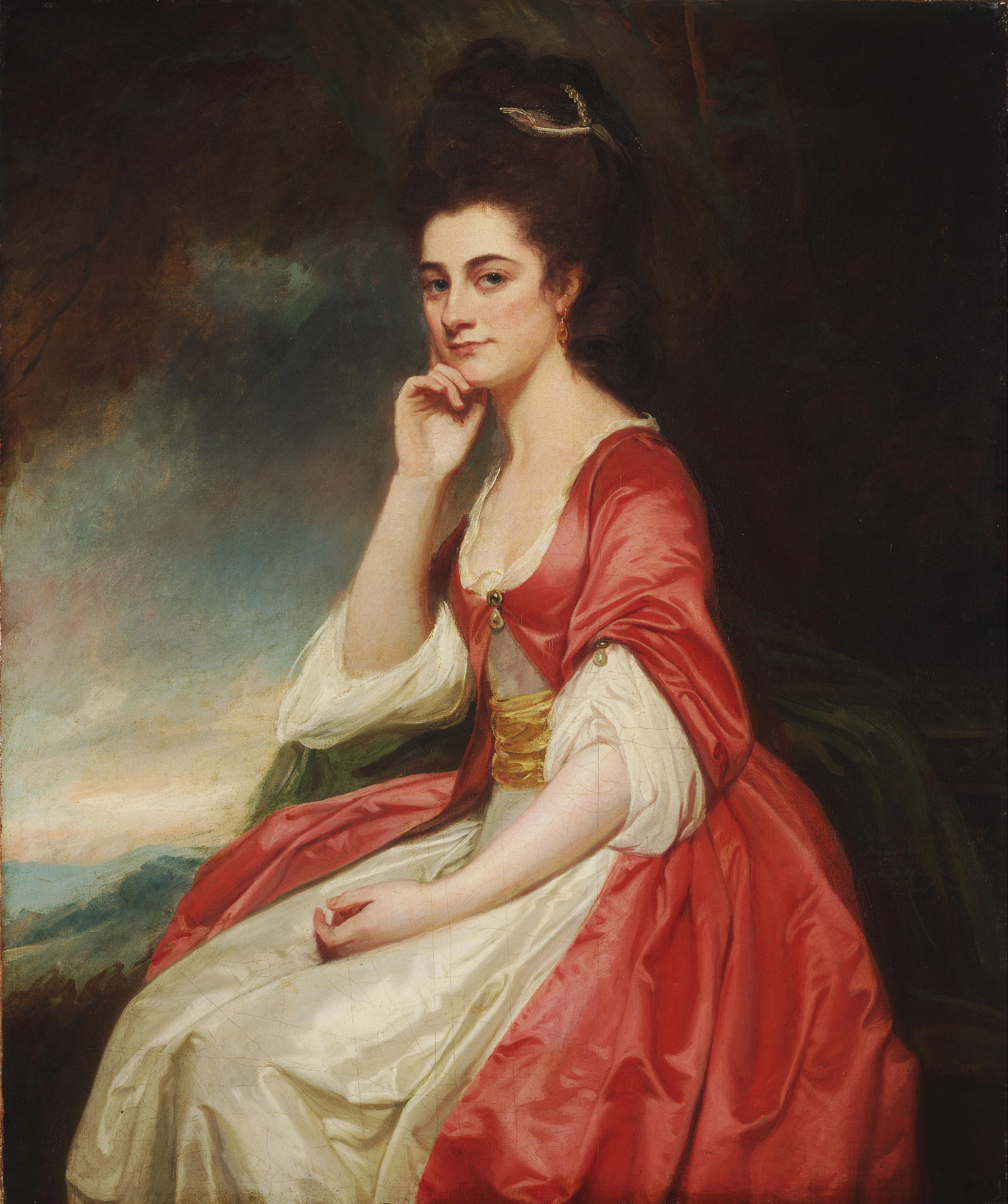
- Portrait by George Romney
- Born: Lady Mary Jemima Yorke; 9 February 1757
- Died: 7 January 1830 (aged 72); Whitehall, London
- Noble family: Yorke (by birth); Robinson (by marriage)
- Spouse: Thomas Robinson, 2nd Baron Grantham (m. 1780–1786)
- Issue: Thomas de Grey, 2nd Earl de Grey; Frederick John Robinson, 1st Earl of Ripon
- Father: Philip Yorke, 2nd Earl of Hardwicke
- Mother: Jemima Campbell, 2nd Marchioness Grey

Mary Jemima Yorke, sometimes referred as Mary Jemima Grey (9 February 1757 – 7 January 1830) was a British peeress. She was a daughter of Jemima Campbell, 2nd Marchioness Grey and Philip Yorke, 2nd Earl of Hardwicke. By marriage to Thomas Robinson, 2nd Baron Grantham, she became Baroness Grantham.

== Family ==
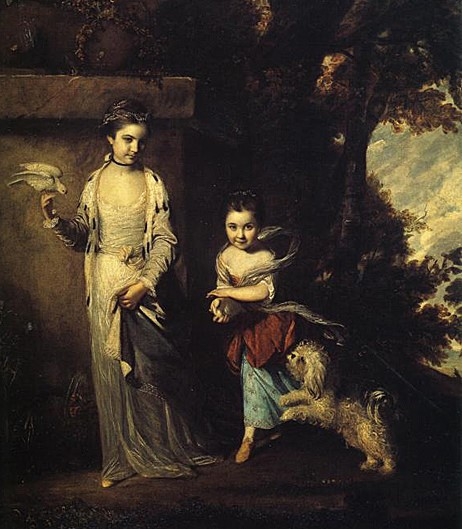
Portrait of Mary with her older sister, Amabel Yorke, by Joshua Reynolds in 1760

Lady Mary Jemima Yorke was born on 9 February 1757, the second daughter and youngest child of Jemima Campbell, 2nd Marchioness Grey, head of the Grey family, and Philip Yorke, 2nd Earl of Hardwicke. She had a sister who was six years older, Amabel Yorke, 1st Countess de Grey. She was educated privately at Wrest. Mary Jemima had a close relationship with her mother, which can be shown in their letters.

== Marriage and children ==
On 17 August 1780, Mary Jemima Yorke married to Thomas Robinson, 2nd Baron Grantham at her parents' town house in St James's Square. The marriage engagement between Lady Mary Jemima and Lord Grantham was almost broken when it was discovered that he had little money save for his salary, but Mary Jemima still chose to wed him.

The couple had three sons, two of them lived through adulthood:

- Thomas de Grey, 2nd Earl de Grey (8 December 1781 – 14 November 1859), born Thomas Philip Robinson. He took the surname Weddell from 1803 and de Grey from 1833 as he succeeded his maternal aunt Amabel Yorke, 1st Countess de Grey as 2nd Earl de Grey.
- Frederick John Robinson, 1st Earl of Ripon (1 November 1782 – 28 January 1859), was Prime Minister of the United Kingdom from 1827 to 1828.
- Philip, born in 1783 and died in infancy.

== Widowhood ==
On 20 July 1786, her husband died at the age of 47. Since his death, The Dowager Baroness became administrator of the Robinson estate at Newby Park in Yorkshire. Besides that, Mary Jemima took charge of their sons' education. Since the early years of the boys' childhood, Mary educated them herself and they were reading at the age of two. She had the help of her brother-in-law, Frederick Robinson and his wife in bringing up the boys. Her mother, The Marchioness Grey and her sister Amabel also gave Mary their advices. In her letters, children were the main subject. Weaning, diet and education were discussed exhaustively.

Although she once wrote that 'I shall not trouble you about politicks, foreign or domestick, as I understand neither', however, both would have been among the constant topics of conversation at her homes, and helped prepare her sons for their political careers. When not at Newby she lived at Grantham House in Putney, bought by her husband before his death, or at Wrest or in St James's Square, London, with her elder sister, who was also a widow at an early age.

Mary Jemima also had influence to her sons regarding to their decisions in their careers, such as Frederick's refusal of office in the Portland administration in 1807. She lived long enough to see her sons accomplish senior office as Thomas became Lord Lieutenant of Bedfordshire in 1818 and Frederick enjoyed a succession of cabinet offices. Their careers perhaps at last vindicated the decision Henry Grey, 1st Duke of Kent had made in 1740 to ensure that his dynasty remained prominent in public life by marrying Mary Jemima's mother, Jemima Campbell, 2nd Marchioness Grey to Philip Yorke, 2nd Earl of Hardwicke.

== Heiress ==
On 10 January 1797, her mother, The Marchioness Grey died. While the title Marquess Grey was extinct following the Marchioness's death, the title Baron Lucas was inherited by her older sister Amabel. As Amabel was later created Countess de Grey in 1816 and had no children, Mary Jemima was her sister's heiress presumptive of both the title Count de Grey and Baron Lucas. Because she died before Amabel, Amabel's titles was inherited by Jemima's oldest son Thomas.

== Death ==
The Dowager Baroness died on 7 January 1830 at Whitehall, when she was 72 years old.

== Ancestry ==
Ancestors of Mary Jemima Yorke, Baroness Grantham

16. John Campbell, 1st Earl of Breadalbane and Holland
8. John Campbell, 2nd Earl of Breadalbane and Holland
17. Mary Rich
4. John Campbell, 3rd Earl of Breadalbane and Holland
18. Edward Villiers
9. Henrietta Villiers
19. Frances Howard
2. Jemima Campbell, 2nd Marchioness Grey
20. Anthony Grey, 11th Earl of Kent
10. Henry Grey, 1st Duke of Kent
21. Mary Lucas, 1st Baroness Lucas
5. Amabel Grey
22. Thomas Crew, 2nd Baron Crew
11. Jemima Crew
23. Anne Armine
1. Mary Jemima Yorke
24.
12. Philip Yorke
25.
6. Philip Yorke, 1st Earl of Hardwicke
26.
13. Elizabeth Gibbon
27.
3. Philip Yorke, 2nd Earl of Hardwicke
28. Thomas Cocks of Castleditch
14. Charles Cocks
29. Elizabeth Gower
7. Margaret Cocks
30. John Somers
15. Mary Somers
31. Catherine Ceaverne

== Bibliography ==
- Collett-White, James (September 23, 2004). "Yorke [née Campbell], Jemima, suo jure Marchioness Grey (1722–1797)". Oxford Dictionary of National Biography (online ed.). Oxford University Press. doi:10.1093/ref:odnb/68351. (Subscription, Wikipedia Library access or UK public library membership required.)
- Colley, Linda. ARISTOCRATIC WOMEN The Social, Political and Cultural History of Rich and Powerful Women (Part 1) (PDF).
- Cokayne, George Edward (1889). The Complete Peerage (Edition 1, Volume 2).
- Cokayne, George Edward (1890). The Complete Peerage (Edition 1, Volume 3).
- Cokayne, George Edward (1892). The Complete Peerage (Edition 1, Volume 4).
- Cokayne, George Edward (1893). The Complete Peerage (Edition 1, Volume 5).
- Cokayne, George Edward (1895). The Complete Peerage (Edition 1, Volume 6).

Peerage of Great Britain
Preceded by First baroness by marriage	Baroness Grantham; 1780–1786	Succeeded by Henrietta Frances Cole
