= Thomas Robinson, 2nd Baron Grantham =

British statesman (1738–1786)

The Right Honourable The Lord Grantham PC
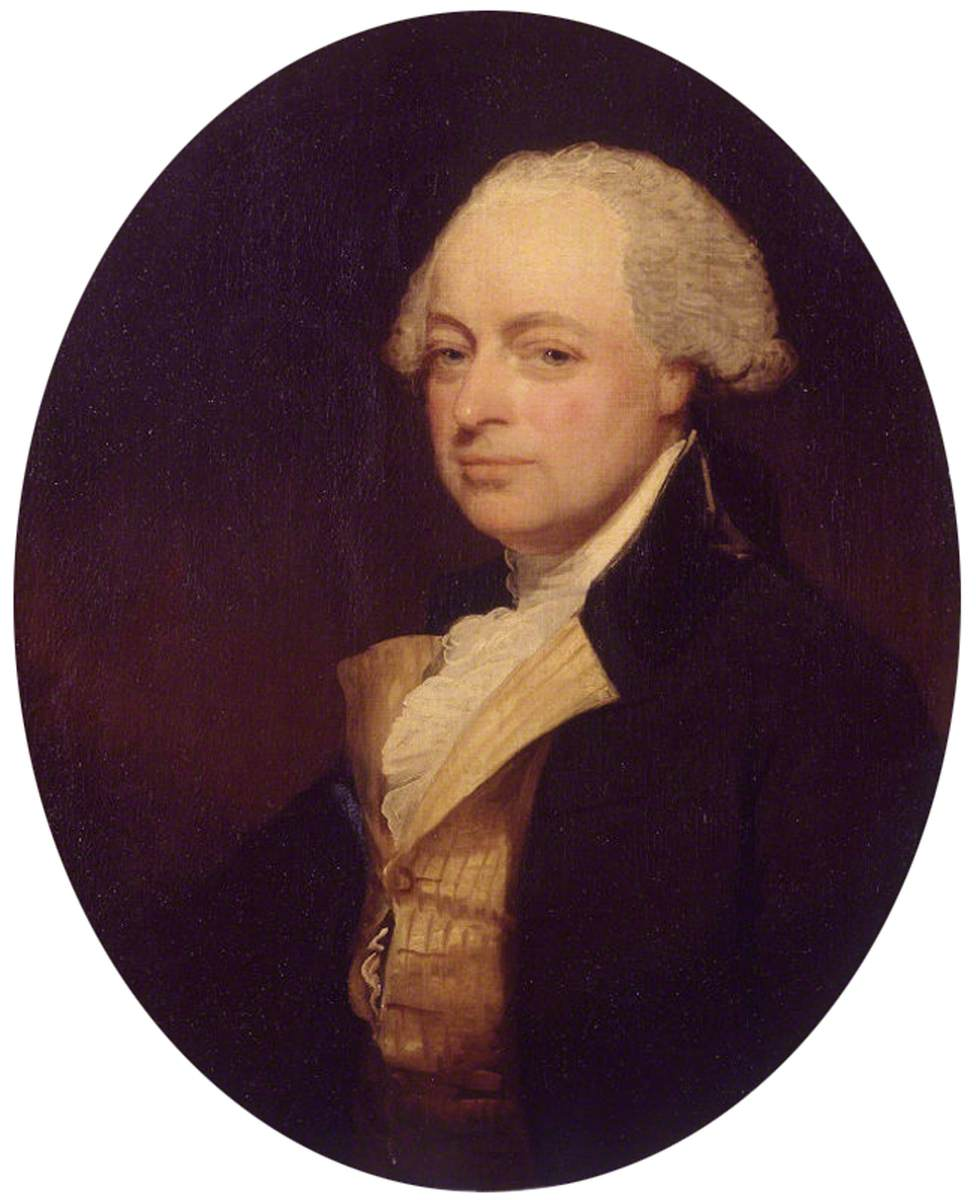
- Portrait by Gilbert Stuart, c. 1785–1786

Secretary of State for Foreign Affairs
- In office 13 July 1782 – 2 April 1783
- Monarch: George III
- Prime Minister: The Earl of Shelburne
- Preceded by: Charles James Fox
- Succeeded by: Charles James Fox

First Lord of Trade
- In office 9 December 1780 – 11 July 1782
- Monarch: George III
- Prime Minister: Lord North; The Marquess of Rockingham
- Preceded by: The Earl of Carlisle
- Succeeded by: The Lord Sydney (President of the Committee on Trade and Foreign Plantations)

Personal details
- Born: 30 November 1738 Vienna, Austria
- Died: 20 July 1786 (aged 47)
- Party: Whig
- Spouse: Lady Mary Jemima Yorke (m. 1780)
- Children: Thomas de Grey, 2nd Earl de Grey; Frederick John Robinson, 1st Viscount Goderich, 1st Earl of Ripon
- Education: Christ's College, Cambridge

Arms of Robinson: Vert, a chevron between three bucks at gaze or

Thomas Robinson, 2nd Baron Grantham PC (30 November 1738 – 20 July 1786) was a British statesman. He notably served as Foreign Secretary between 1782 and 1783.

== Background and education ==
Grantham was born in Vienna, Austria, the son of Thomas Robinson, 1st Baron Grantham, British Ambassador to Austria at the time, by his wife Frances, daughter of Thomas Worsley. He was educated at Westminster School and at Christ's College, Cambridge.

== Political career ==
Grantham entered parliament as member for Christchurch in 1761, and succeeded to the peerage, because of his father's death, in 1770. That year he was appointed to the Privy Council. In 1771 he was sent as British Ambassador to Spain and retained this post until war broke out between Great Britain and Spain in 1779. In 1772, while at the Summer Spanish Court in Aranjuez, he received correspondence from Richard Wall, the Spanish Minister of Foreign Affairs. From 1780 to 1782 Grantham was President of the Board of Trade, and from July 1782 to April 1783 Foreign Secretary under Lord Shelburne.

== Marriage and progeny ==
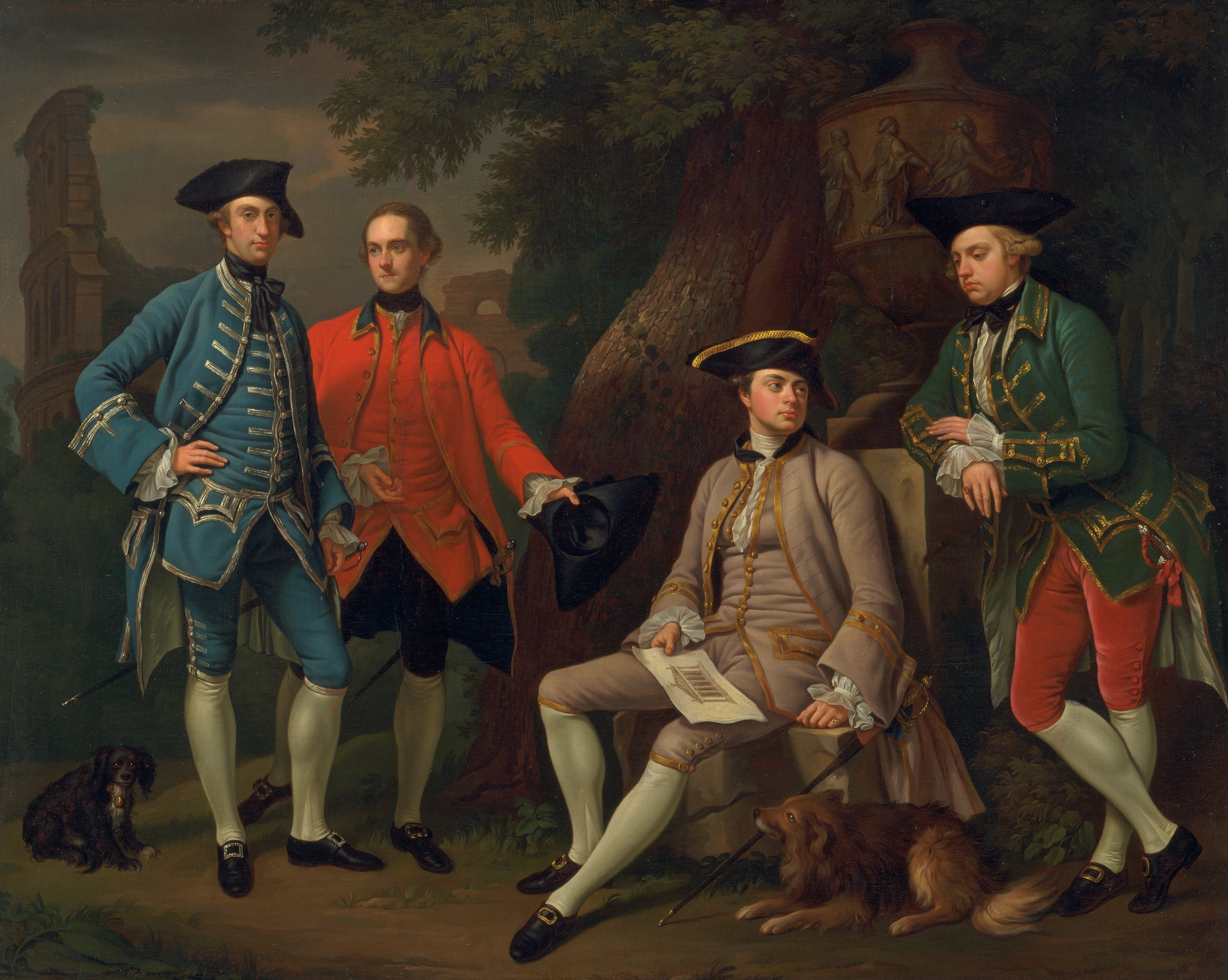
James Grant of Grant, John Mytton, the Hon. Thomas Robinson, and Thomas Wynne by Nathaniel Dance-Holland, c. 1760.

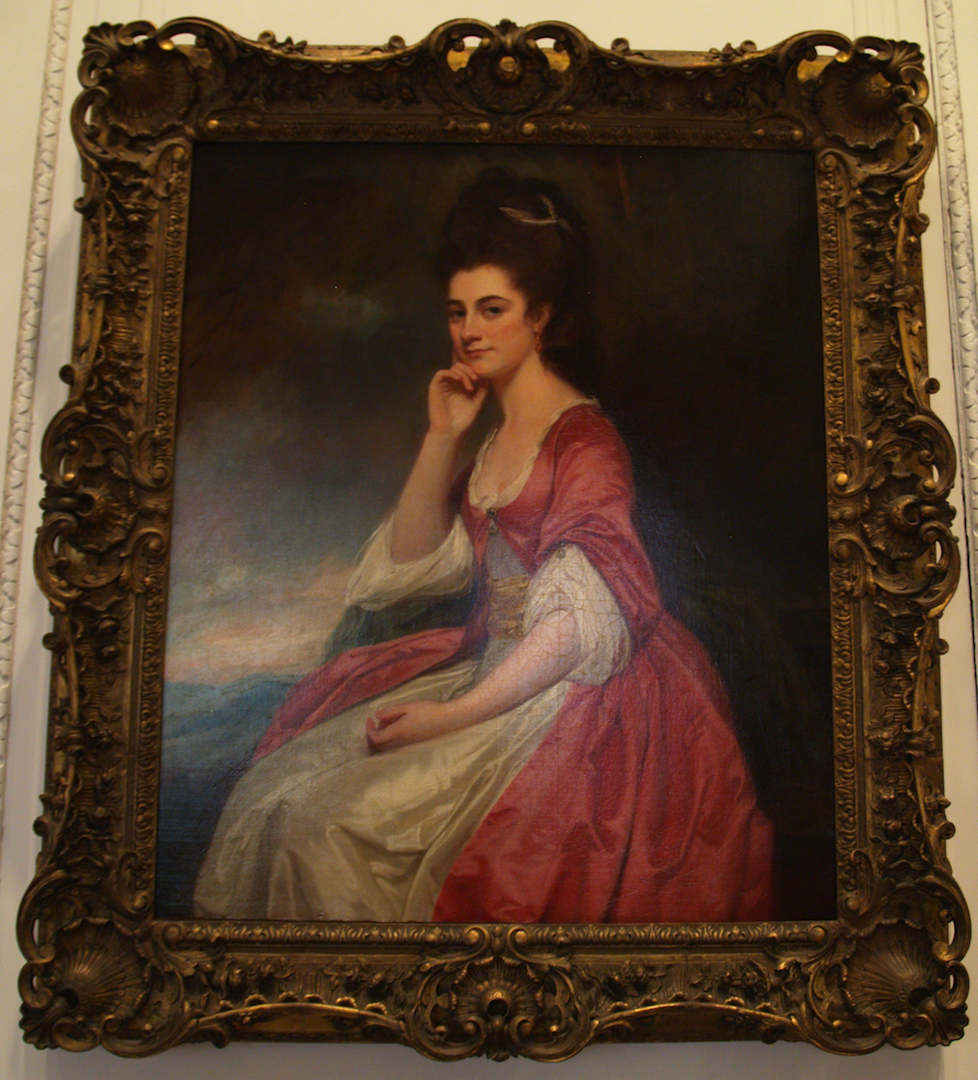
Lady Mary Jemima Yorke (1757–1830) by George Romney, Lady Grantham c.1780-81

In 1780 Lord Grantham married Lady Mary Jemima Yorke (1757–1830), younger daughter of Philip Yorke, 2nd Earl of Hardwicke by his wife Lady Jemima Campbell (1723–1797), suo jure 2nd Marchioness Grey, a daughter of John Campbell, 3rd Earl of Breadalbane and Holland by his wife Lady Amabel Grey, a daughter of Henry Grey, 1st Duke of Kent (1671–1740).

In 1740 Lord Grantham's mother-in-law Lady Jemima Campbell (1723–1797) succeeded as 2nd Marchioness Grey by a special remainder upon the death of her maternal grandfather Henry Grey, 1st Duke of Kent, 1st Marquess Grey, 3rd Baron Lucas. As she had no male heirs, the title later became extinct upon her own death in 1797, but in 1816 her elder daughter Lady Amabel Yorke (1750–1833) (wife of Alexander Hume-Campbell, Lord Polwarth) was created Countess de Grey in her own right.

Lord Grantham and his wife lived at Grantham House in Whitehall Yard, Westminster. By his wife had two sons:

- Thomas de Grey, 2nd Earl de Grey, eldest son and heir. He was born as Thomas Philip Robinson, his surname was Weddell from 1803 and de Grey from 1833.
- Frederick John Robinson, 1st Viscount Goderich, 1st Earl of Ripon (1782–1859), Prime Minister of the United Kingdom in 1827 and 1828.

== Death ==
He died on 20 July 1786, aged only 47, and was succeeded in the barony by his eldest son, Thomas de Grey, 2nd Earl de Grey. His widow continued to live at Grantham House until her own death in January 1830, aged 72 years.

== See also ==
- Wrest Park

Parliament of Great Britain
Preceded by Sir Thomas Robinson; John Mordaunt	Member of Parliament for Christchurch; 1761–1770; With: James Harris	Succeeded by James Harris; Sir James Harris
Political offices
Preceded by Viscount Villiers	Vice-Chamberlain of the Household; 1770–1771	Succeeded by Viscount Hinchingbrooke
Preceded by The Earl of Carlisle	First Lord of Trade; 1780–1782	Succeeded by Thomas Townshend as President of the Committee on Trade and Foreign Plantations
Preceded by Charles James Fox	Secretary of State for Foreign Affairs; 1782–1783	Succeeded by Charles James Fox
Peerage of Great Britain
Preceded by Thomas Robinson	Baron Grantham; 1770–1786	Succeeded by Thomas Robinson
