= Thomas de Grey, 2nd Earl de Grey =

British Tory statesman (1781-1859)

The Right Honourable The Earl de Grey KG PC FRS
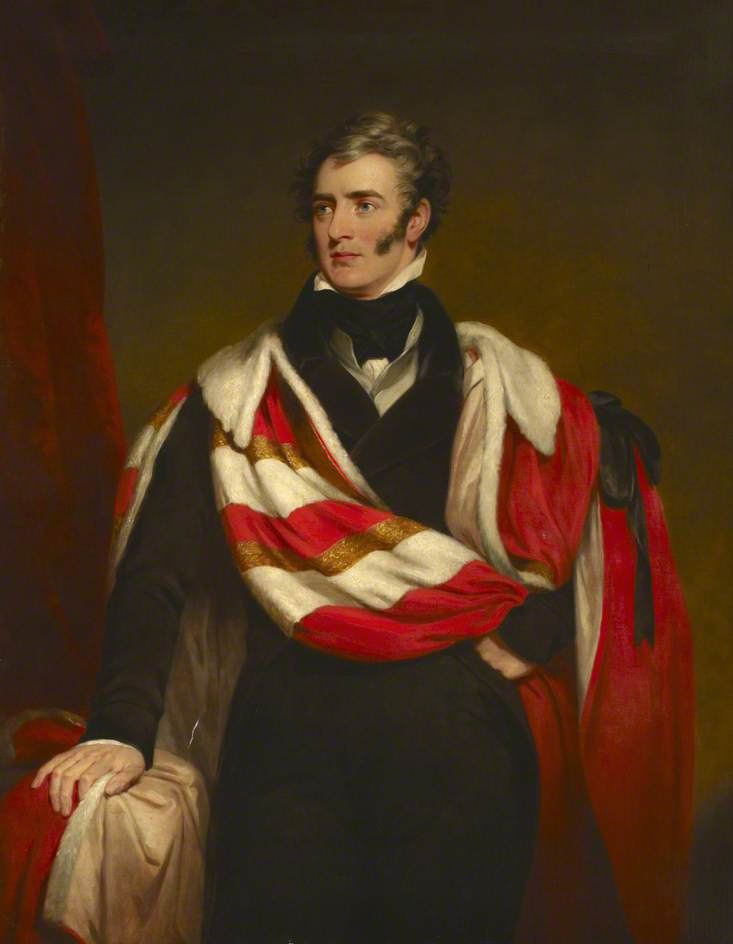

First Lord of the Admiralty
- In office 22 December 1834 – 8 April 1835
- Monarch: William IV
- Prime Minister: Sir Robert Peel, Bt
- Preceded by: The Lord Auckland
- Succeeded by: The Lord Auckland

Lord Lieutenant of Ireland
- In office 11 September 1841 – 17 July 1844
- Monarch: Queen Victoria
- Prime Minister: Sir Robert Peel, Bt
- Preceded by: Viscount Ebrington
- Succeeded by: The Lord Heytesbury

Personal details
- Born: Thomas Philip Robinson; 8 December 1781
- Died: 14 November 1859 (aged 77)
- Party: Tory
- Spouse: Lady Henrietta Cole
- Education: St John's College, Cambridge

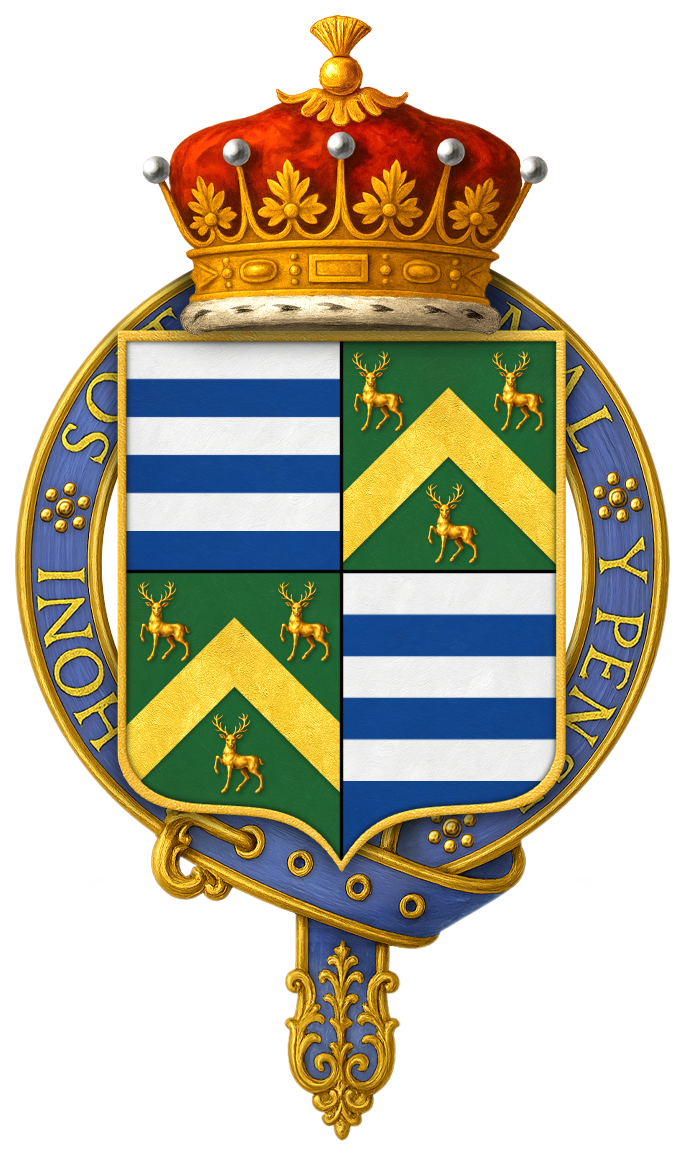
Quartered arms of Thomas de Grey, 2nd Earl de Grey, KG, PC, FRS, viz. Quarterly 1st and 4th barry of six Argent and Azure for Grey; 2nd and 3rd Vert a chevron between three stags at gaze Or for Robinson.

Thomas Philip de Grey, 2nd Earl de Grey (born Robinson, later Weddell; 8 December 1781 – 14 November 1859), styled as The Hon. Thomas Robinson until 1786 and as Lord Grantham from 1786 to 1833, of Wrest Park in the parish of Silsoe, Bedfordshire, was a British Tory statesman. He changed his surname to Weddell in 1803 and to de Grey in 1833.

== Origins ==
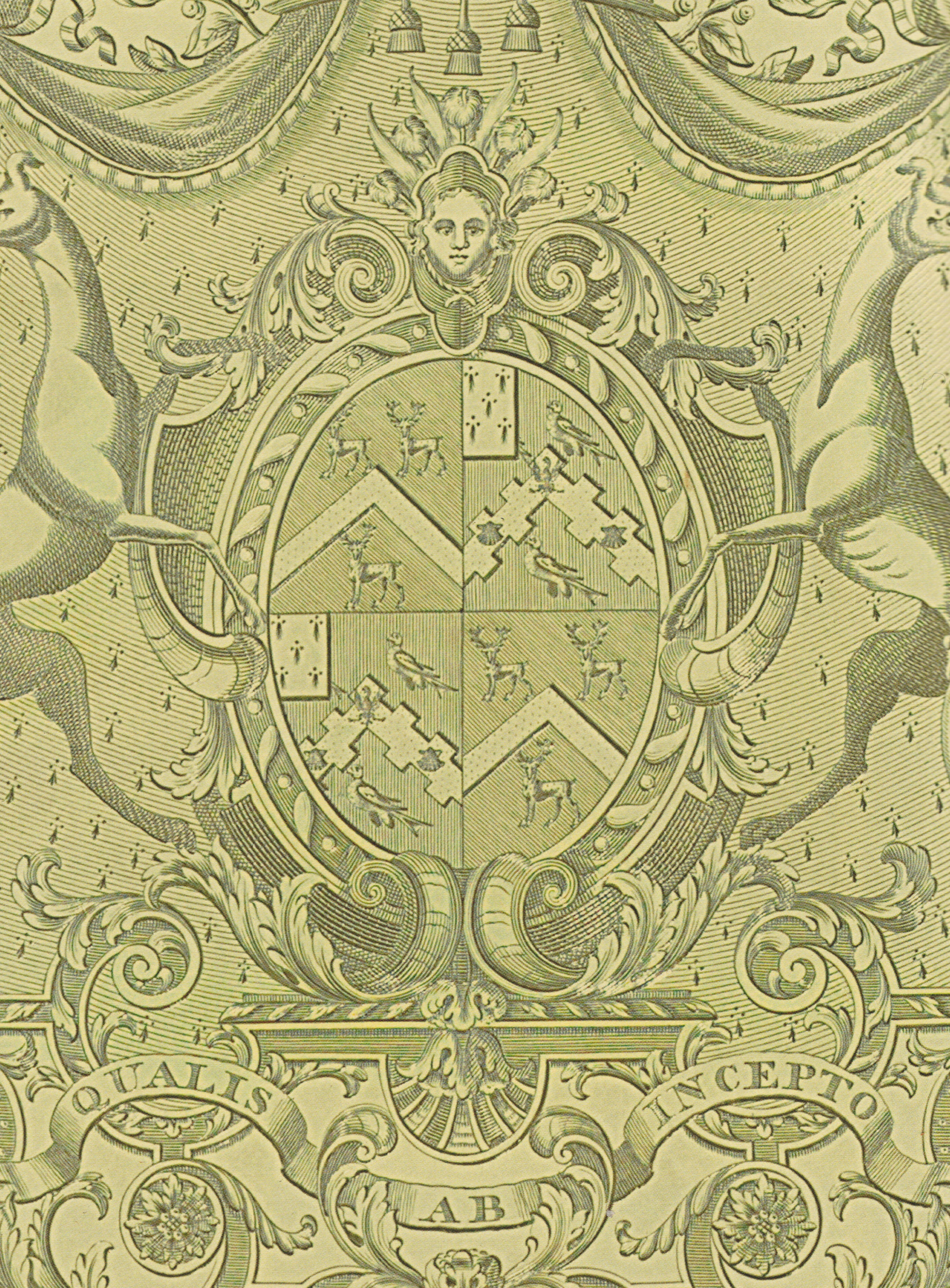
Detail from a silver gilt dish made in 1802 for the 3rd Baron Grantham by Robert Garrard of London, showing the engraved arms of Robinson quartering Weddell

He was the eldest son of Thomas Robinson, 2nd Baron Grantham (1738–1786) of Newby Hall, Newby-on-Swale, a deserted medieval village and of adjacent Rainton, both in the parish of Topcliffe in Yorkshire, by his wife Lady Mary Jemima Yorke (1757–1830), the younger daughter of Philip Yorke, 2nd Earl of Hardwicke by his wife Jemima Campbell, suo jure 2nd Marchioness Grey. His younger brother was the Prime Minister Frederick John Robinson, 1st Earl of Ripon, 1st Viscount Goderich, known to history as "Lord Goderich".

== Inheritance ==
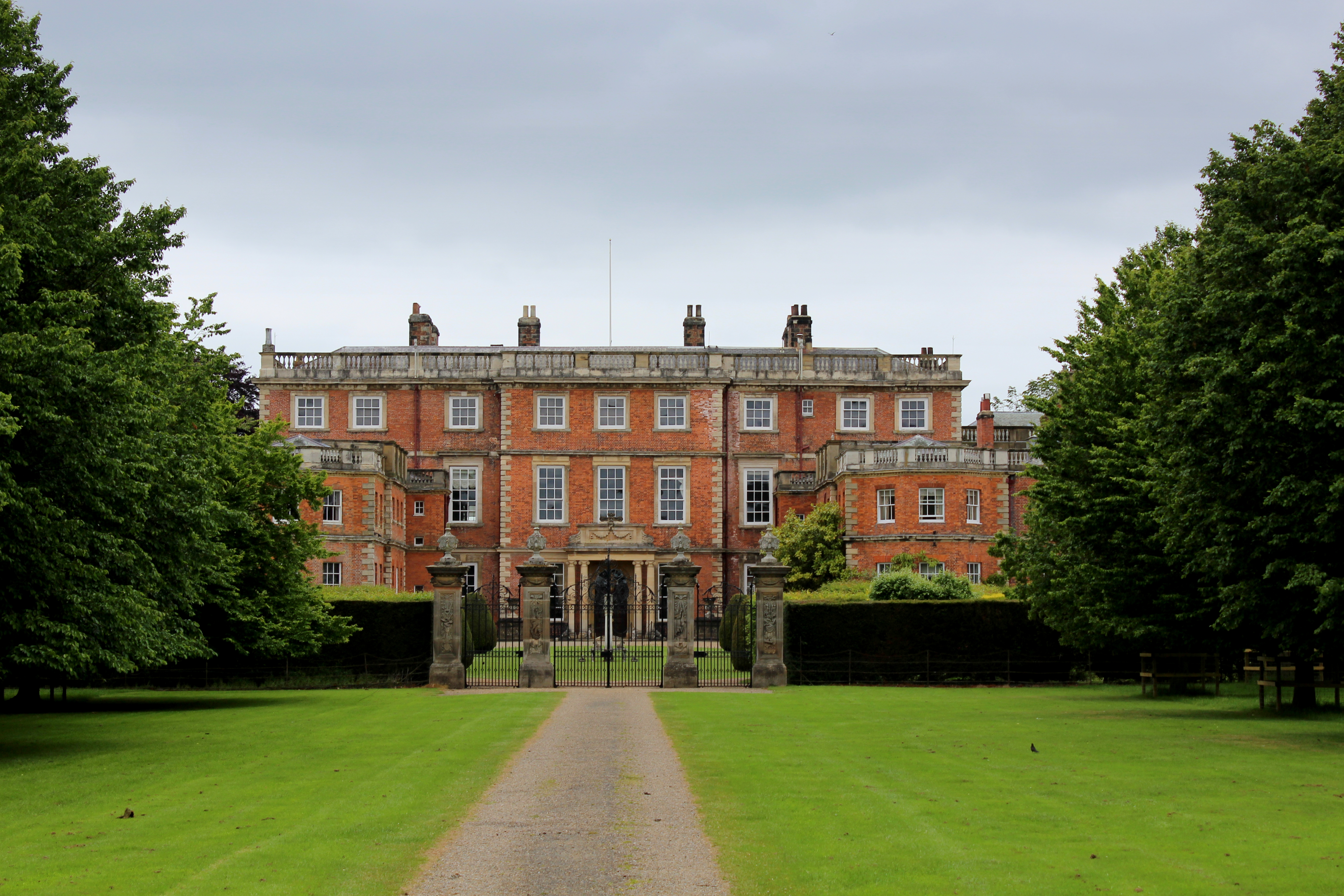
Newby Hall, Yorkshire

In 1786 he succeeded his father as 3rd Baron Grantham. In 1792 he became the heir of his distant cousin William Weddell (1736–1792) of Newby Hall in Yorkshire, a notable art collector. Also in 1792 he became the 6th Robinson Baronet "of Newby", succeeding his father's first cousin Norton Robinson, 5th Baronet (died 1792). In 1833 he succeeded his maternal aunt Amabel Hume-Campbell, suo jure 1st Countess de Grey and 5th Baroness Lucas (1750–1833), as 2nd Earl de Grey (according to a special remainder) and as 6th Baron Lucas, of Crudwell. He also inherited her estate of Wrest Park in Silsoe, Bedfordshire.

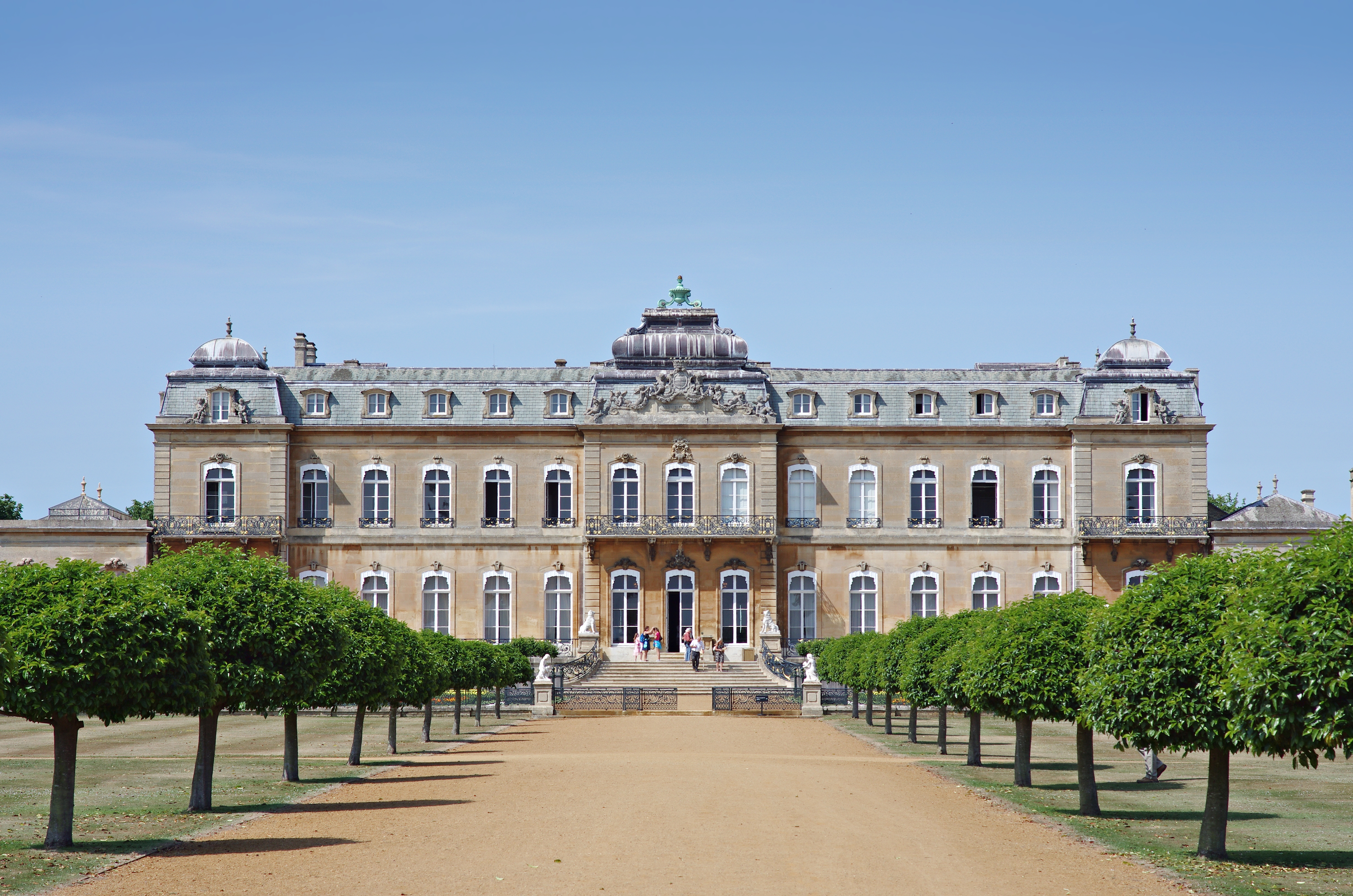
Wrest Park, Bedfordshire

== Career ==
In 1798 he was admitted to St John's College, Cambridge, graduating MA in 1801. He was made Privy Counsellor in December 1834 while holding office as First Lord of the Admiralty till April 1835, and a Knight of the Garter in 1844. He was colonel-commandant of the Yorkshire Hussars, a part-time Yeomanry Cavalry regiment, for over forty years and was appointed yeomanry aide-de-camp to William IV and held similar position under Queen Victoria. Lord Grantham was nominated as Lord Lieutenant of Bedfordshire in 1818, an office which he held until his death. He served as Lord Lieutenant of Ireland from September 1841 to July 1844. During his time in Ireland he disagreed with Peel's religious conciliation of Ireland, claiming that economic conciliation was a greater priority. He called for more legislation focused on Ireland whilst Peel pursued economic legislation aimed at benefitting the UK as a whole. Charles Read has argued that De Grey was also the key figure who politically defeated the Irish nationalist Repeal movement without any bloodshed, a rare achievement in an era that featured the very bloody Peterloo massacre and the 1848 Revolutions in Europe.

=== Other public positions ===
On the founding of the Institute of British Architects in London in 1834 he was invited to become its first president remaining so till his death in 1859. The institute received its Royal Charter in 1837 becoming Royal Institute of British Architects in London; he was also the first president of the Royal Architectural Museum. Earl de Grey was also a fellow of the Royal Society from 1841, a fellow of the Society of Antiquaries, and served as one of the New Buckingham Palace Commissioners from 1848. He remodeled his London townhouse at No.4 St James's Square (now the Naval & Military Club) and between February 1833 and October 1839 rebuilt Wrest Park, his seat in Bedfordshire, in the French style, assisted by James Clephan. He redesigned the deer park and added decoration and several statues.

== Marriage and children ==
In 1805 he married Lady Henrietta Cole, a daughter of William Cole, 1st Earl of Enniskillen, by whom he had two daughters and co-heiresses:

- Lady Anne Florence de Grey (Countess Cowper), eldest daughter and co-heiress, who married George Cowper, 6th Earl Cowper. She was suo jure Baroness Lucas, having inherited that title from her father. She also inherited her father's main seat Wrest Park, near Silsoe, in Bedfordshire as well as his London home at 4 St James's Square.
- Lady Mary Gertrude de Grey, younger daughter and co-heiress. She married Henry Vyner (1805 - 1861) and she inherited one of her father's secondary properties, Newby Hall in Yorkshire. The other family seats, namely Studley Royal Park and its neighbouring Fountains Hall in Yorkshire, together with the Earldom devolved upon Lord de Grey's nephew, George Robinson, 1st Marquess of Ripon, who married Lady Mary's daughter Henrietta. On Ripon's death the estate - but not the title - passed to Lady Mary Vyner's descendants at whose hands it remains today.

== Death and succession ==
Lord de Grey died in November 1859, aged 77, having survived his wife by eleven years. He was succeeded in the Barony of Lucas of Crudwell by his daughter, Ann de Grey (Countess Cowper), who married George Cowper, 6th Earl Cowper. His other titles, unable to pass via a female line, passed to his heir male, namely his nephew, George Robinson, 1st Marquess of Ripon, 2nd Earl of Ripon.

Honorary titles
Preceded by The Earl of Upper Ossory	Lord Lieutenant of Bedfordshire; 1818–1859	Succeeded by The Duke of Bedford
Political offices
Preceded by The Lord Auckland	First Lord of the Admiralty; 1834–1835	Succeeded by The Lord Auckland
Preceded by Viscount Ebrington	Lord Lieutenant of Ireland; 1841–1844	Succeeded by The Lord Heytesbury
Peerage of the United Kingdom
Preceded by Amabel Hume-Campbell	Earl de Grey; 1833–1859	Succeeded by George Robinson
Peerage of England
Preceded by Amabel Hume-Campbell	Baron Lucas; 1833–1859	Succeeded by Anne Cowper
Peerage of Great Britain
Preceded by Thomas Robinson	Baron Grantham; 1786–1859	Succeeded by George Robinson
Baronetage of England
Preceded by Norton Robinson	Baronet (of Newby); 1792–1859	Succeeded by George Robinson
