= Henrietta Frances de Grey =

Anglo-Irish political hostess and philanthropist

The Right Honourable The Countess de Grey
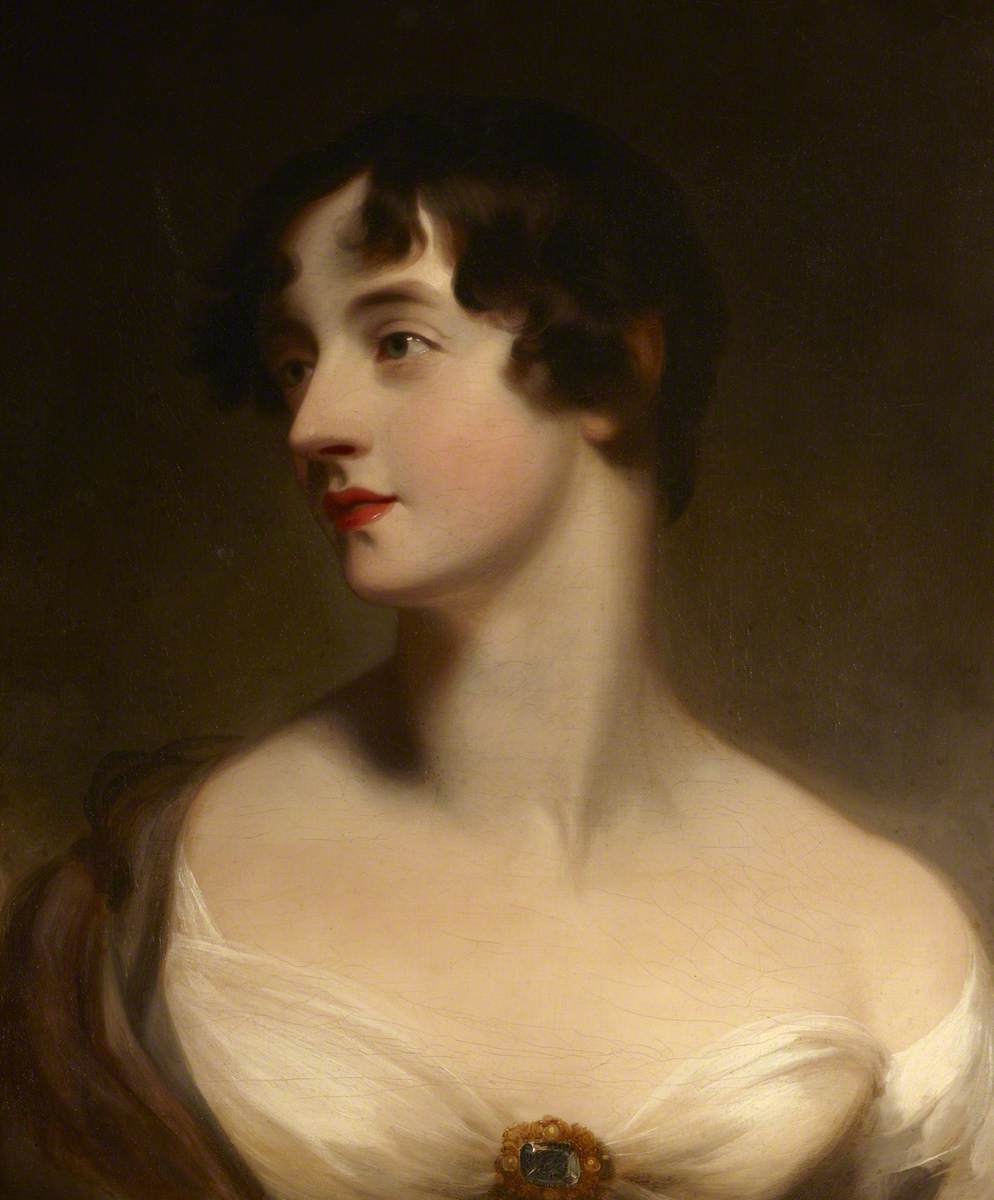
- Born: The Hon. Henrietta Frances Cole; 22 June 1784; Florence Court, County Fermanagh, Ireland
- Died: 2 July 1848 (aged 64); 4 St James's Square, London, England
- Spouse: Thomas de Grey, 2nd Earl de Grey
- Issue: 5
- Father: William Cole, 1st Earl of Enniskillen
- Mother: Anne Lowry-Corry

Henrietta Frances de Grey, Countess de Grey (née Cole; 22 June 1784 – 2 July 1848) was an Anglo-Irish political hostess and philanthropist.

== Early life and family ==
Henrietta Frances de Grey was born Henrietta Frances Cole at Florence Court, County Fermanagh on 22 June 1784. She was the youngest of the ten children of William Cole, 1st Earl of Enniskillen, and his wife Anne, daughter of Galbraith Lowry-Corry. Her maternal uncle was Armar Lowry-Corry, 1st Earl Belmore. From her early letters, it appears that she was well educated. She attended the viceregal court at Dublin Castle from 1802. When her mother fell ill in 1802, her father placed her in charge of the household at Florence Court. She met Thomas Weddell de Grey in September 1803, who was "much struck by her". He proposed to her on 23 June 1805, and they were married on 20 July 1805 at the estate of Henry Luttrell, 2nd Earl of Carhampton, in Cobham, Surrey. They honeymooned at her husband's homes at Putney and the Newby estate.

The couple were close, and it has been noted that their correspondence shows a strong mutual respect. They had five children, with only their eldest two daughters surviving to adulthood:

- Anne Florence (8 June 1806 – 25 July 1880), married George Cowper, 6th Earl Cowper; suo jure Baroness Lucas, having inherited that title from her father
- Thomas Philip (21 August 1807 – 30 March 1810)
- Mary Gertrude (5 February 1809 – 11 July 1892)
- Frederick William (11 April 1810 – 6 February 1831)
- Anabel Elizabeth (11 October 1816 – 13 September 1827)

She was affected by the early deaths of her two sons and youngest daughter for the rest of her life.

== Public life ==
As her husband did not smoke and Lady de Grey preferred not to retire after dinner to a drawing room, she was deeply engaged with male after-dinner conversations about politics in the library. It was here that she had developed an influence on senior politicians and started a deep, platonic, friendship with Sir Robert Peel. Through their letters he confided in her his frustrations along with religious and political opinions he did not share with his male colleagues. She warned of the oncoming "bedchamber crisis" in 1839 which helped Peel negotiate the situation and led to him forming a government in 1841. She was opposed to Peel's invitations to her husband to become Lord Lieutenant of Ireland, as she did not want to leave their new home at Wrest Park and the wider society in England.

In September 1841, her husband did accept Peel's request, and became Lord Lieutenant of Ireland. As his wife, Lady de Grey was his firm supporter, and the newspapers of the time note how frequently she was at his side. Having attended the Dublin court in her youth, Lady de Grey held in November 1841 the largest viceregal levee in Dublin since King George IV's visit in 1821, continuing to entertain on a grand scale. These events had different motivations, including trying to bring communities together, and attempting to dissuade Protestants from marching in response to the Repeal meetings. Still interested in philanthropy, she suggested public works to boost employment in Ireland that were funded from royal estates, and schemes to encourage native industries in Dublin.

From her letters, it is clear that she did not sympathise with Orange views, and contrary to allegations in the newspapers and biographies of her husband, she did not influence her husband's views towards Orange opinions. When he became ill in 1844, Lady de Grey took over his political correspondence, going on to negotiate his retirement and the selection of William à Court, 1st Baron Heytesbury as his successor. After his retirement, she remained a supporter of Peel, including his policy to increase the Maynooth Grant. She did have great reservations as to whether Ireland would benefit from the repeal of the corn laws, maintaining that the Irish famine was due to a "scarcity of money" rather than a lack of food.

In early 1848, Lady de Grey's health began to decline, and she died at 4 St James's Square, London on 2 July 1848 from cancer. She is buried in the De Grey Mausoleum with a tomb sculpted by Terence Farrell. Portraits of Lady de Grey are held at Florence Court, the National Portrait Gallery, London and the National Gallery of Ireland.
