= Amabel Hume-Campbell, 1st Countess de Grey =

British diarist, political writer and countess

Amabel Hume-Campbell
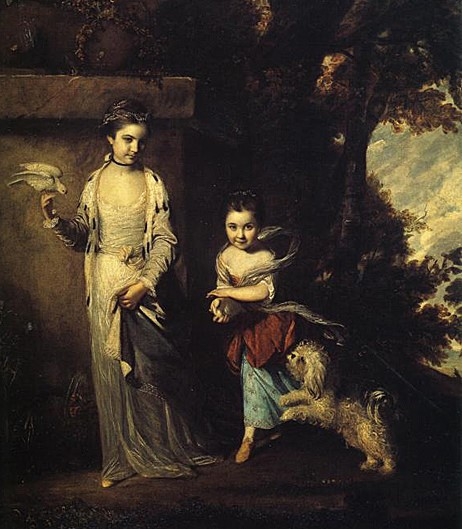
- Portrait with her younger sister, Mary, by Joshua Reynolds in 1760

Countess de Grey
- Tenure: 1816–1833
- Successor: Thomas de Grey
- Other titles: Baroness Lucas; Lady Polwarth
- Born: Lady Amabel Yorke; 23 January 1751
- Died: 4 March 1833 (aged 82); Westminster, Greater London, England
- Spouses: Alexander Hume-Campbell, Lord Polwarth
- Father: Philip Yorke, 2nd Earl of Hardwicke
- Mother: Jemima Campbell, 2nd Marchioness Grey
- Occupation: Writer; artist

Amabel Hume-Campbell, 1st Countess de Grey, 5th Baroness Lucas (née Yorke; 23 January 1751 – 4 March 1833) was a British diarist and political writer who was a countess and baroness in her own right. Had she been male, she would have served in the House of Lords as a Whig. She wrote particularly about the French Revolution.

== Life and family ==
Lady Amabel Yorke was born in 1751, the elder daughter of Philip Yorke, 2nd Earl of Hardwicke, and his wife, Jemima Campbell, 2nd Marchioness Grey, 4th Baroness Lucas. She was educated at home, which was either Wrest Park in Bedfordshire or the family's London home in St James's Square. She loved books from the age of five, and she became a diarist. She was painted as a child by Joshua Reynolds, and engravings of that portrait are in the National Portrait Gallery in London.

She was taught about art by James Basire and Alexander Cozens, and about etching by James Bretherton. Her own prints are kept in the British Museum. She wrote about political matters, and had she been male, she would have served in the House of Lords as a Whig. She wrote particularly about the French Revolution.

She married Alexander Hume-Campbell, Lord Polwarth, on 17 August 1780, but the marriage was childless.

In 1797, she became 5th Baroness Lucas, inheriting the title from her mother. (Note: Her mother's other peerage, Marquess Grey became extinct on her death.) In 1816, she was created Countess de Grey in her own right, with a special remainder to her sister and her sister's male heirs. (Note: The new title was named "de Grey" rather than "Grey" like her mother's to distinguish it from the earldom of Grey, a title that had been created in 1806.) Her younger sister, Mary, who predeceased her, married Thomas Robinson, 2nd Baron Grantham, and had children, the eldest of whom inherited the earldom of de Grey and the barony of Lucas.

The countess died in Westminster in 1833. She left over 4,000 etchings to the British Museum, and many of these are thought to be from her own collecting.

== Notes ==
Peerage of the United Kingdom
| New creation | Countess de Grey; 1816–1833 | Succeeded by Thomas de Grey |
Peerage of England
| Preceded by Jemima Yorke | Baroness Lucas; 1797–1833 | Succeeded by Thomas de Grey |
