= Philip Yorke, 2nd Earl of Hardwicke =

British politician and writer

The Right Honourable The Earl of Hardwicke PC FRS
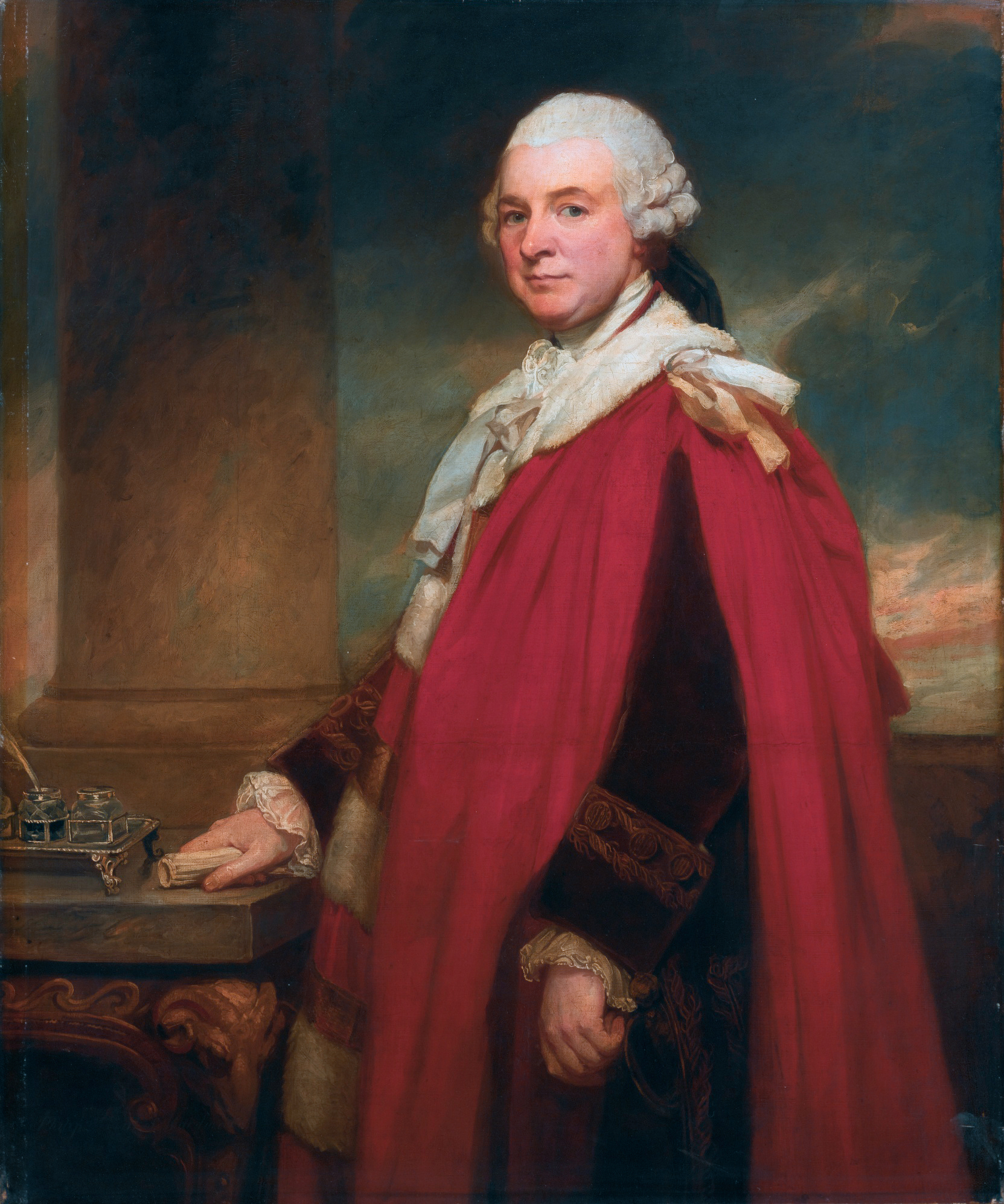
- Lord Hardwicke in the parliamentary robes of an earl, by George Romney c. 1776
- Born: Philip Yorke; 9 March 1720
- Died: 16 May 1790 (aged 70)
- Education: Corpus Christi College, Cambridge
- Spouse: Lady Jemima Campbell (m. 1740)

Philip Yorke, 2nd Earl of Hardwicke, PC, FRS (9 March 1720 – 16 May 1790), styled Viscount Royston between 1754 and 1764, was a British politician and writer.

== Life ==
The eldest son of Philip Yorke, 1st Earl of Hardwicke, he was educated at Newcome's School and later Corpus Christi College, Cambridge. He was appointed Teller of the Exchequer in 1738, a post he held for life. In 1741 he was elected a Fellow of the Royal Society.

He sat in the House of Commons as member for Reigate (1741–47), and afterwards for Cambridgeshire; he kept notes of the debates which were afterwards embodied in Cobbett's Parliamentary History.

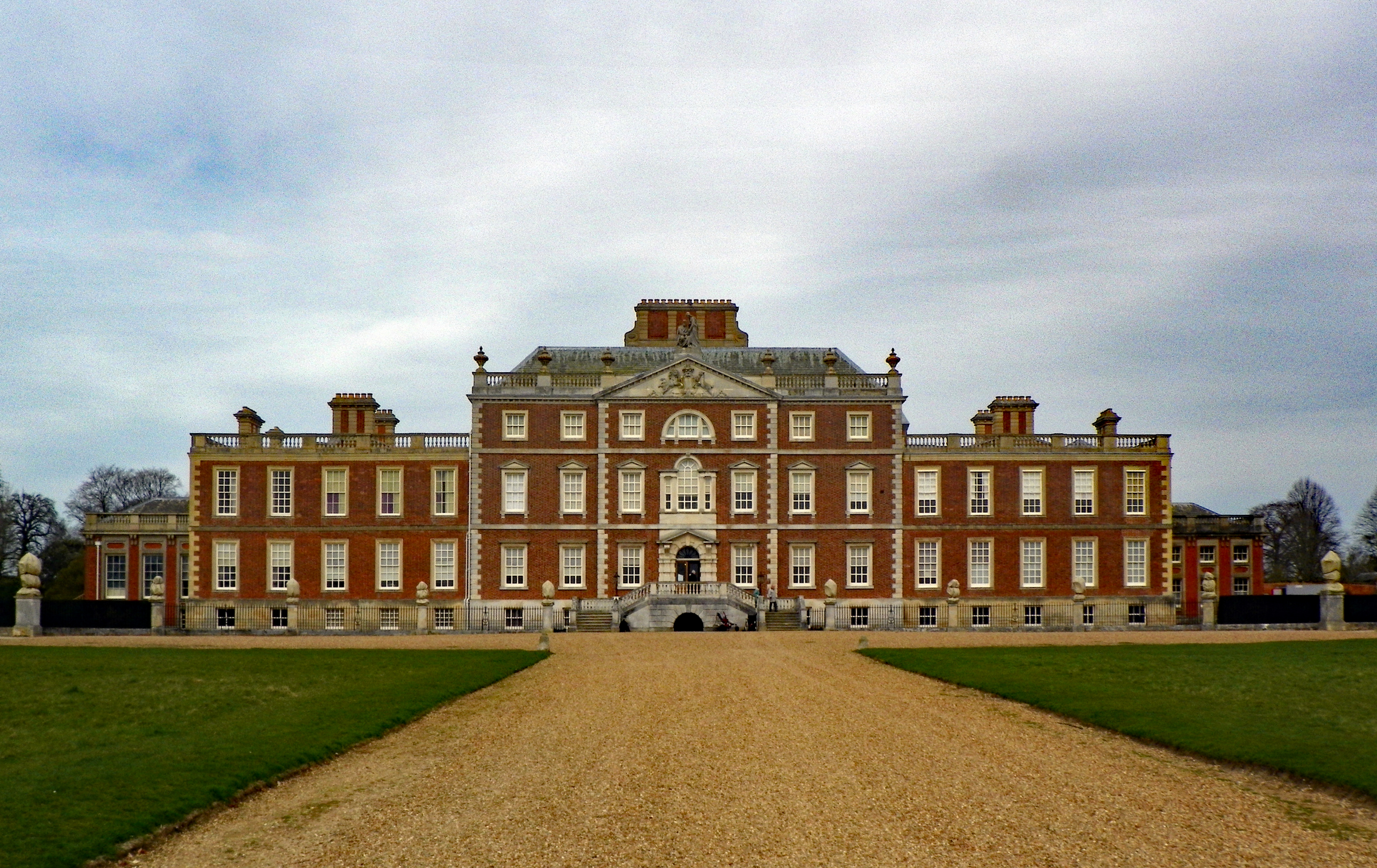
Wimpole Hall

During the political crisis over the loss of Minorca to the French in 1756, Lord Royston was tapped with collecting favourable press accounts of the ministry. He joined his father, as well as Lord Mansfield, to defend the Newcastle ministry during the parliamentary inquiries following the execution of Admiral John Byng.

He was styled by the courtesy title Viscount Royston from 1754 to 1764, when he succeeded to the earldom on the death of his father. He inherited the Wimpole estate, Cambridgeshire which his father had bought from Edward Harley, Earl of Oxford. On the accession of George III in 1760, Yorke was sworn of the privy council.

In politics he supported the Rockingham Whigs. He was Lord Lieutenant of Cambridgeshire (1757 to his death) and high steward of Cambridge University. He edited a quantity of miscellaneous state papers and correspondence, to be found in manuscript collections in the British Museum. Between 1756 and 1760, he served in the honorary position of vice president of the Foundling Hospital, a charitable institution providing for London's abandoned children.

He died in 1790 and was buried in Flitton, Bedfordshire with a monument by Thomas Banks.

== Works ==
- Miscellaneous State Papers, 2 vols, London, Strahan and Cadell, 1778

With his brother, Charles Yorke, Philip Yorke was one of the chief contributors to Athenian Letters; or the Epistolary Correspondence of an agent of the King of Persia residing at Athens during the Peloponnesian War (4 vols., London, 1741), a work that for many years had a considerable vogue and went through several editions.

== Marriage and children ==
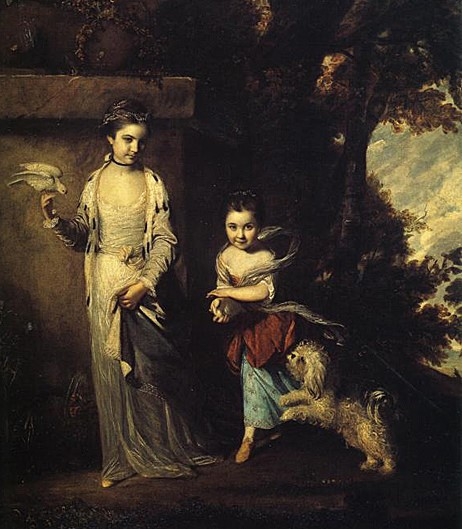
Ladies Amabel and Mary Jemima Yorke 1760 by Joshua Reynolds

On 22 May 1740 he married Lady Jemima Campbell, only daughter of John Campbell, 3rd Earl of Breadalbane by his wife Lady Amabel Grey, daughter and heiress of Henry Grey, 1st Duke of Kent (1671–1740). On the death of her grandfather the Duke of Kent in 1740, Jemima succeeded him in her own right as the 2nd Marchioness Grey and 4th Baroness Lucas. By his wife he had two daughters and co-heiresses:

- Lady Amabel Yorke, 1st Countess de Grey (23 January 1751 – 4 March 1833), eldest daughter, who married Alexander Hume-Campbell, Lord Polwarth, childless. She succeeded her mother as 5th Baroness Lucas.
- Lady Mary Jemima Yorke (9 February 1756 – 1830), who married Thomas Robinson, 2nd Baron Grantham and had issue.

== Death and succession ==
He was succeeded in the earldom by his nephew Philip Yorke, 3rd Earl of Hardwicke.

Parliament of Great Britain
Preceded by James Cocks; John Hervey	Member of Parliament for Reigate; 1741–1747; With: James Cocks 1741–1747; Charles Cocks 1747	Succeeded by Charles Cocks; Charles Yorke
Preceded by Samuel Shepheard; Soame Jenyns	Member of Parliament for Cambridgeshire; 1747–1764; With: Soame Jenyns 1747–1754; Marquess of Granby 1754–1764	Succeeded by Marquess of Granby; Sir John Hynde Cotton, Bt
Political offices
Preceded by Sir Charles Turner, Bt	Teller of the Exchequer; 1738–1786	Succeeded by The Earl Bathurst
Honorary titles
Preceded by The Earl of Lincoln	Lord Lieutenant of Cambridgeshire; 1757–1790	Succeeded by The Earl of Hardwicke
Peerage of Great Britain
Preceded by Philip Yorke	Earl of Hardwicke; 1764–1790	Succeeded by Philip Yorke
