= Jemima Yorke, 2nd Marchioness Grey =

British peeress

The Most Honourable The Marchioness Grey
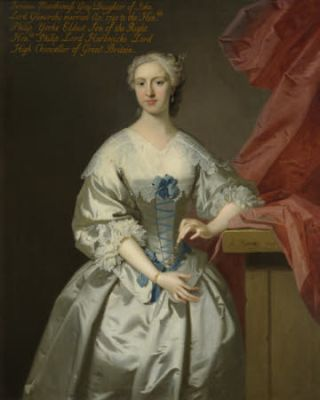
- Portrait by Allan Ramsay

Marchioness Grey
- Tenure: 5 June 1740 – 10 January 1797
- Predecessor: Henry Grey, 1st Duke of Kent
- Other titles: Countess of Hardwicke; Baroness Lucas
- Born: The Hon. Jemima Campbell; 9 October 1723
- Died: 10 January 1797 (aged 73)
- Spouse: Philip Yorke, 2nd Earl of Hardwicke (m. 1740; died 1790)
- Issue: Amabel Hume-Campbell, 1st Countess de Grey; Mary Jemima Yorke, Baroness Grantham
- Parents: John Campbell, 3rd Earl of Breadalbane and Holland; Lady Amabel Grey

Jemima Yorke, 2nd Marchioness Grey and Countess of Hardwicke (née Campbell; 9 October 1723 – 10 January 1797), was a British peeress.

== Life and family ==
She was a daughter of John Campbell, 3rd Earl of Breadalbane and Holland, and his first wife, Lady Amabel Grey. Her maternal grandparents were Henry Grey, 1st Duke of Kent, and his first wife, the Hon. Jemima Crew.

On 22 May 1740, she married the Hon. Philip Yorke (later 2nd Earl of Hardwicke), and they had two daughters:

- Lady Amabel Yorke, 1st Countess de Grey, 5th Baroness Lucas (22 January 1751 –1833), married Alexander Hume-Campbell, Lord Polwarth; no issue.
- Lady Mary Jemima Yorke (1757–1830), married Thomas Robinson, 2nd Baron Grantham, and had issue.

On 5 June that year, she succeeded as Marchioness Grey by a special remainder upon the death of her maternal grandfather, the Duke of Kent, who held the title. As she had no male heirs, the title of Marchioness became extinct upon her own death in 1797 while her eldest daughter, Amabel succeeded to the title of 5th Baroness Lucas. That same daughter was later created Countess de Grey in her own right.

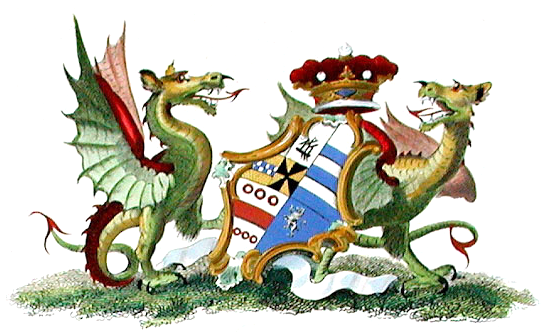
Coat of arms of the 2nd Marchioness Grey

== See also ==
- Wrest Park

Peerage of Great Britain
Preceded by Henry Grey	Marchioness Grey; 1740–1797	Extinct
Peerage of England
Preceded by Henry Grey	Baroness Lucas; 1740–1797	Succeeded by Amabel Hume-Campbell
