= Viscount Goderich =

Extinct viscountcy in the Peerage of the United Kingdom

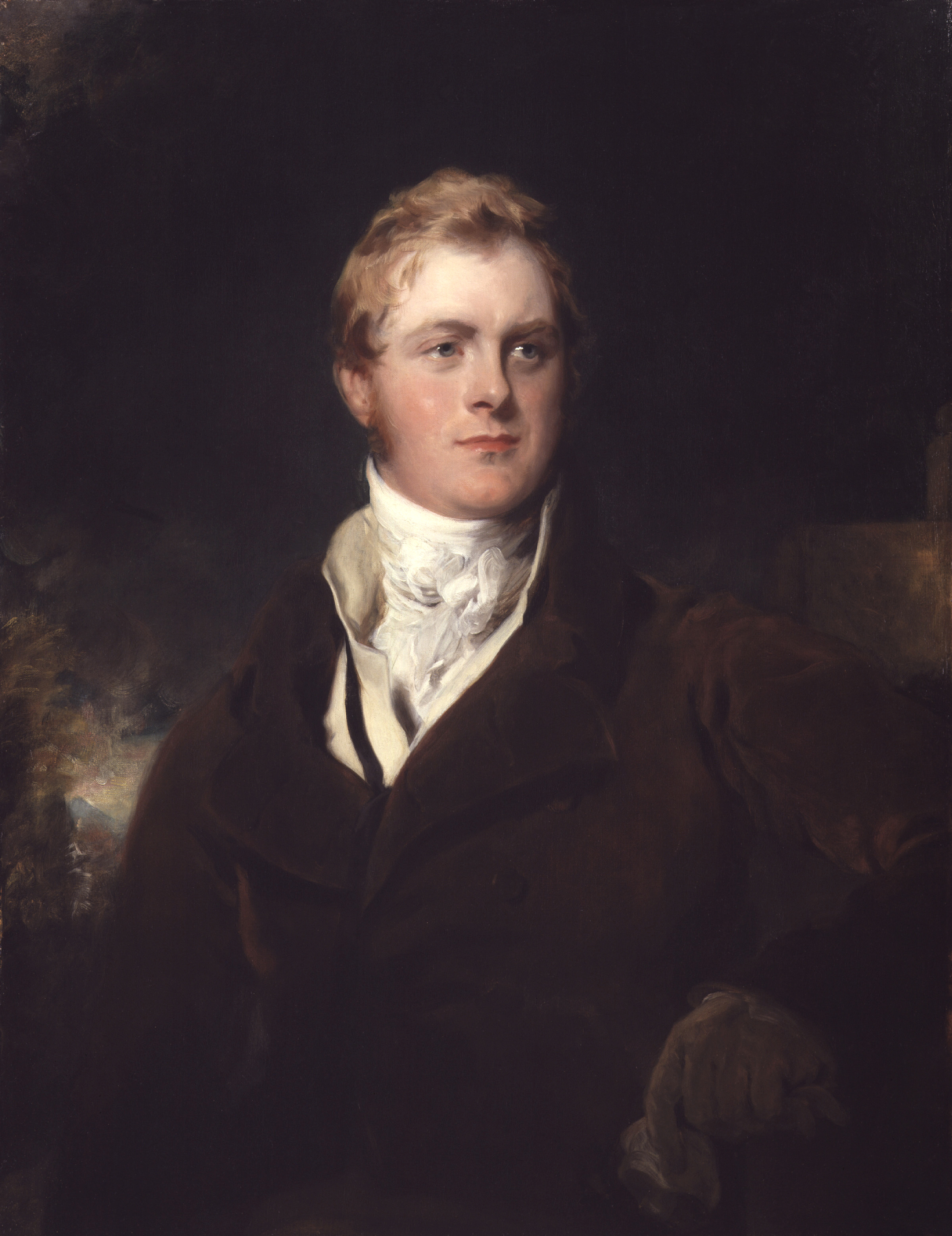
Frederick John Robinson, 1st Earl of Ripon

Viscount Goderich was a title that was created twice in British history. The first creation came in the Peerage of England in 1706 in favour of Henry Grey, 12th Earl of Kent. He was made Marquess of Kent at the same time and was further honoured when he was made Duke of Kent in 1710. All the titles became extinct on his death in 1740. For further information on this creation, see Duke of Kent (1710 creation). The second creation came in the Peerage of the United Kingdom in 1827 in favour of the Honourable F. J. Robinson. He was a great-great-grandson of the first Duke of Kent. In 1833 he was further honoured when he was made Earl of Ripon. For further history of this creation, see Marquess of Ripon.

The title is taken from Goodrich Castle in Herefordshire, owned by the Earls of Kent.

== Viscounts Goderich; First creation (1706) ==
- see Duke of Kent (1710 creation)

== Viscounts Goderich; Second creation (1827) ==
- see Marquess of Ripon
