= Baron Lucas =

Barony in the Peerage of England

Arms of Lucas of Little Saxham, Suffolk and Shenfield, Essex: Argent, a fess between six annulets gules

Baron Lucas is a title that has been created twice in the Peerage of England. The second creation is extant and is currently held with the title Lord Dingwall in the Peerage of Scotland.

== Barons Lucas (of Shenfield) (1645) ==
The title Baron Lucas, of Shenfield in the County of Essex, was created 13 January 1645 for Sir John Lucas, a Royalist army officer. He was succeeded according to a special remainder in the letters patent by his nephew, Charles Lucas. The title became dormant on the death of the third Baron in 1705.

- John Lucas, 1st Baron Lucas of Shenfield (1606–1671),
- Charles Lucas, 2nd Baron Lucas (1631–1688). Son of the first Baron's elder brother, Sir Thomas Lucas (1598–1649), a royalist army officer, and technically illegitimate as Thomas's parents married after he was born.
- Robert Lucas, 3rd Baron Lucas of Shenfield (c.1649–1705), unmarried.

== Barons Lucas (of Crudwell) (1663) ==
The title Baron Lucas, of Crudwell in the County of Wiltshire, was created at the request of John Lucas, her father, in 1663 for Mary, Countess of Kent, new wife of the 11th Earl of Kent and only surviving child of the 1st Baron of the first creation above. The title was created with remainder to her heirs male by Lord Kent and failing which to her heirs general without division (the latter being the same way that the Crown passed, i.e. to the eldest daughter in the absence of sons, rather than going into abeyance or to the nearest male-line relative). The 1st Baroness was succeeded by her son, who had already succeeded as 12th Earl of Kent, and who was successively created Marquess of Kent and Duke of Kent. (See Duke of Kent for information on the Kent peerages.)

In 1718, the Duke of Kent's elder son, Anthony, Earl of Harold (1695–1723), was summoned to Parliament by a writ in acceleration as Baron Lucas, and is usually numbered as the 3rd Baron (see note below). In view of the death of both his sons and the consequent extinction of the dukedom at his death the Duke managed to obtain in 1740 (at the cost of his other Grey titles excluding Lucas) only a new marquessate, Marquess Grey. However he obtained a special remainder of the marquessate, in default of his heirs male, to his granddaughter, Jemima Campbell (who was the only surviving child of his eldest daughter, the former Lady Amabel Grey, who was the late wife of Lord Glenorchy (later 3rd Earl of Breadalbane and Holland)). On the Duke's death later that year, the Barony of Lucas, along with the Marquessate of Grey, passed to this granddaughter (by now the wife of the 2nd Earl of Hardwicke), who became 2nd Marchioness Grey and 4th Baroness Lucas of Crudwell.

On her death, the Marquessate became extinct and the Barony passed to her eldest daughter, Amabel, Lady Polwarth (widow of Alexander, Lord Polwarth, eldest son of the 3rd Earl of Marchmont), who became 5th Baroness Lucas. In 1816 she was created Countess de Grey, of Wrest in the County of Bedford, in the Peerage of the United Kingdom, with a special remainder to her sister (the widow of the 2nd Baron Grantham) and her heirs male. (See Earl de Grey for information on that peerage.)

On her death, the Earldom of de Grey and the Barony of Lucas passed under their respective remainders to her nephew, the 3rd Baron Grantham, who became 2nd Earl de Grey and 6th Baron Lucas. On his death, the Earldom of de Grey passed to his nephew, the 2nd Earl of Ripon, and the Barony passed to his daughter, Anne, Countess Cowper (widow of the 6th Earl Cowper), who became 7th Baroness Lucas. On her death, the Barony passed to her son, the 7th Earl Cowper, who became 8th Baron Lucas. He was restored as 3rd Baron Butler in the Peerage of England and 4th Lord Dingwall in the Peerage of Scotland upon the termination of the attainder on those titles. (See Earl Cowper for the Cowper peerages.)

On his death, the Earldom of Cowper and its associated titles became extinct, the Barony of Butler became abeyant, and the Barony of Lucas and the Lordship of Dingwall passed to his nephew, Auberon Herbert (a grandson of the 3rd Earl of Carnarvon), who became 9th Baron Lucas and 5th Lord Dingwall. He was confirmed in the titles in 1907 by the Committee for Privileges of the House of Lords. After this, the succession was straightforward, the Barony and Lordship passing to the 9th Baron and 5th Lord's sister Nan Ino Herbert (later Cooper) (the 10th Baroness and 6th Lady), then her daughter (the 11th Baroness and 7th Lady), and then her son (the 12th Baron and 8th Lord), who is the current holder of the titles.

The Lord Lucas and Dingwall is a grandson of the 3rd Earl of Selborne, and so is also in remainder to the Earldom of Selborne and its subsidiary titles. He is also one of the co-heirs to the Barony of Butler.

- Mary Grey, Countess of Kent, 1st Baroness Lucas (d. 1702)
- Henry Grey, 1st Duke of Kent, 1st Marquess Grey, 2nd Baron Lucas (1671–1740)
- Anthony Grey, Earl of Harold, 3rd Baron Lucas (1695–1723) (by writ in acceleration)
- Jemima Yorke, 2nd Marchioness Grey, 4th Baroness Lucas (1722–1797)
- Amabel Hume-Campbell, 1st Countess de Grey, 5th Baroness Lucas (1751–1833)
- Thomas Philip de Grey, 2nd Earl de Grey, 6th Baron Lucas (1781–1859)
- Anne Florence Cowper, Countess Cowper, 7th Baroness Lucas (1806–1880)
- Francis Thomas de Grey Cowper, 7th Earl Cowper, 8th Baron Lucas and 4th Lord Dingwall (1834–1905)
- Auberon Thomas Herbert, 9th Baron Lucas and 5th Lord Dingwall (1876–1916)
- Nan Ino Cooper, 10th Baroness Lucas and 6th Lady Dingwall (1880–1958)
- Anne Rosemary Palmer, 11th Baroness Lucas and 7th Lady Dingwall (1919–1991)
- Ralph Matthew Palmer, 12th Baron Lucas and 8th Lord Dingwall (b. 1951)

The heir apparent is Lewis Edward Palmer, Master of Dingwall (b. 1987)

== See also ==
- Baron Lucas of Chilworth
- Lord Dingwall
- Duke of Kent (1710 creation)
- Earl de Grey
- Marquess of Ripon
- Earl of Selborne
- Baron Butler
- Wrest Park
