= Henry Grey, 1st Duke of Kent =

British politician and courtier

His Grace The Duke of Kent KG PC
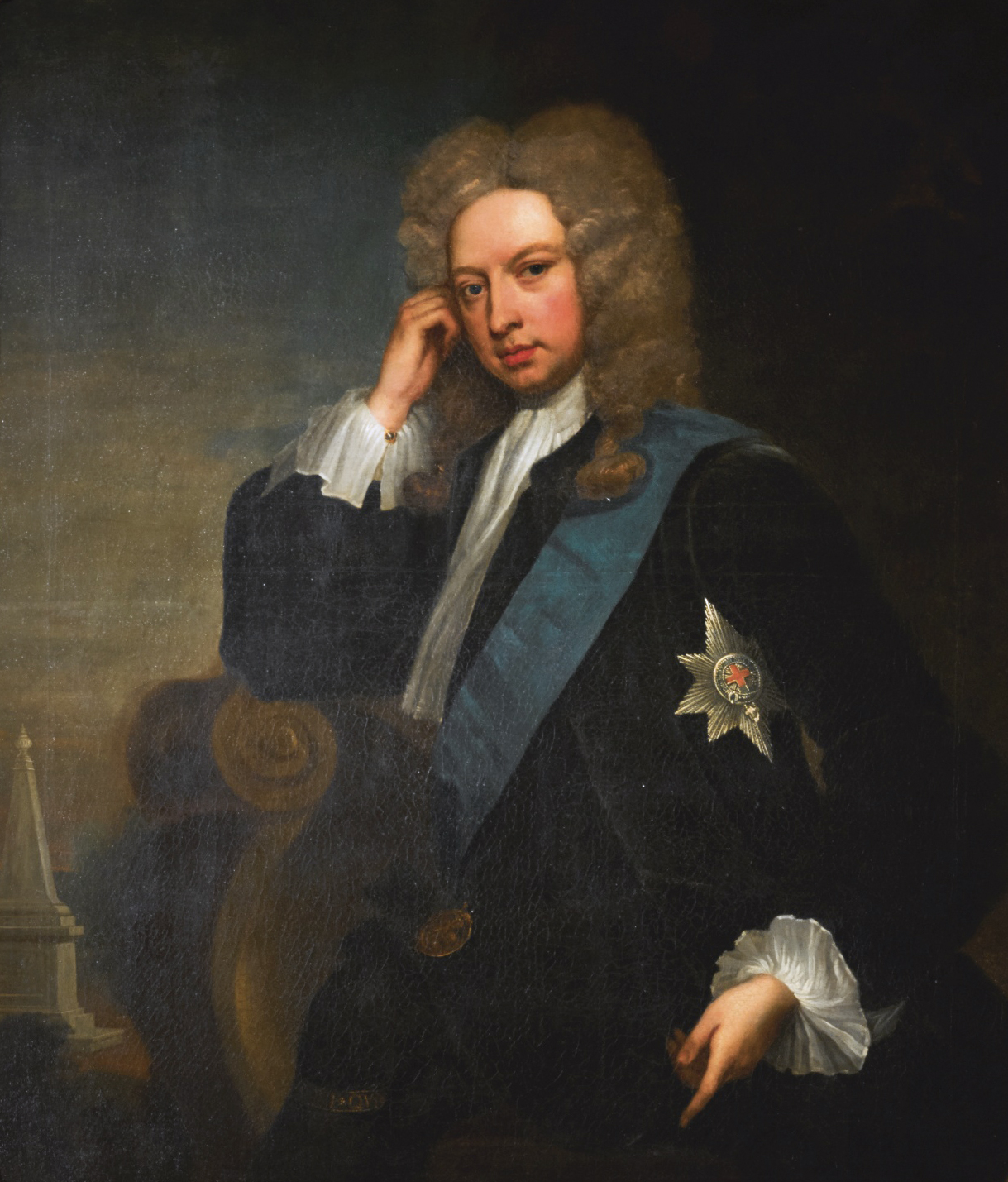
- Portrait by Charles Jervas

Lord Chamberlain
- In office 1704–1710
- Preceded by: The Earl of Jersey
- Succeeded by: The Duke of Shrewsbury

Lord Steward of the Household
- In office 1716–1718
- Preceded by: The Duke of Devonshire
- Succeeded by: The Duke of Argyll

Lord Privy Seal
- In office 1719–1720
- Preceded by: The Duke of Kingston
- Succeeded by: The Duke of Kingston

Personal details
- Born: Henry Grey; 1671
- Died: 5 June 1740 (aged 68–69)
- Children: 8, including Anthony

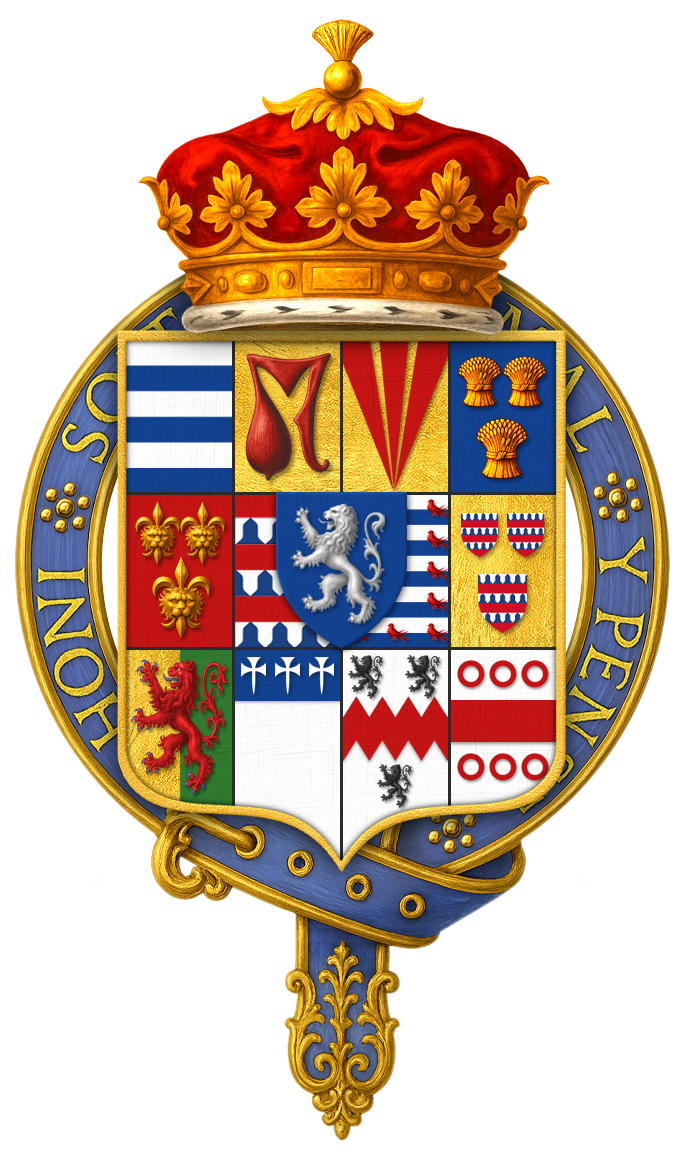
Quartered coat of arms of Henry Grey, 1st Duke of Kent, KG, PC

Henry Grey, 1st Duke of Kent (1671 – 5 June 1740), was a British politician and courtier. None of his sons outlived him, so his new title became extinct on his death. Though the house he built at Wrest Park in Bedfordshire has gone, parts of his very grand garden have survived relatively untouched.

== Family ==
He was a son of Anthony Grey, 11th Earl of Kent, and Mary Grey, 1st Baroness Lucas. He succeeded his father as Earl of Kent in 1702, having succeeded his mother as Baron Lucas earlier the same year. He was the grandfather, through his daughter Anne Grey, of Henry Cavendish, the preeminent English chemist and physicist of the late 18th century.

== Political career ==
Having taken his seat in the House of Lords and though regarded as lacking talent and ambition he, as the politically expedient candidate, was made Lord Chamberlain and a Privy Councillor in 1704. Grey was unpopular; he was nicknamed 'Bug' for his body odour. He traded his position for a dukedom in 1710, and was succeeded as Lord Chamberlain by the Duke of Shrewsbury. Contemporary commentators including John Macky and Jonathan Swift did defend Grey. He might have been, for his time, the right man in the right place.

After 1710 he served in politically minor positions: Gentleman of the Bedchamber, Constable of Windsor Castle, Lord Steward of the Household from 1716 until 1718, and Lord Keeper of the Privy Seal from 1719 until 1720. He was one of the Lords Justices appointed during the absence of George I of Great Britain.

In 1719, Grey was one of the main subscribers in the eighteenth-century Royal Academy of Music, a corporation that produced baroque opera on stage. At the age of 68, a year before his death, he took part, as a founding governor, in the creation of Britain's first home for abandoned children, London's Foundling Hospital.

== Titles ==
Grey succeeded his father as Earl of Kent in 1702, having succeeded his mother as Baron Lucas earlier the same year. He was created Marquess of Kent, Earl of Harold and Viscount Goderich in 1706, Duke of Kent in 1710 for relinquishing his Lord Chamberlain position, and made a Knight of the Garter in 1712. Left without a male heir after the death of his son George Grey, Earl of Harold, in 1733, he was created Marquess Grey in 1740, with a special remainder to his granddaughter Lady Jemima Campbell and her heirs male. She also succeeded to the Lucas barony. His other titles became extinct at his death.

== Marriages and children ==
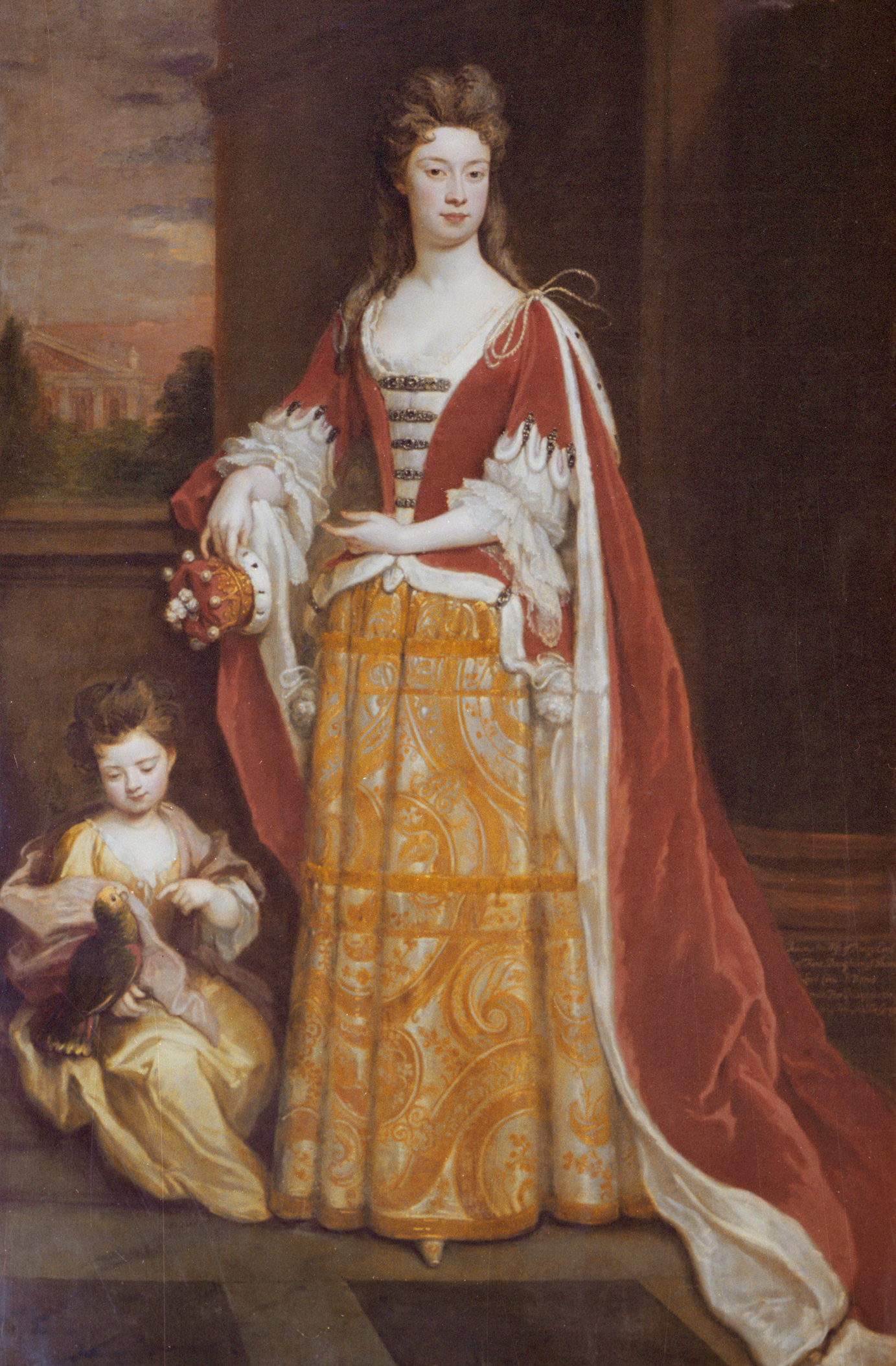
Jemima Crew and Jemima Grey, Henry's first wife and one of their daughters, respectively

Henry married firstly, in 1694, Jemima Crew (died 2 July 1728), a daughter of Thomas Crew, 2nd Baron Crew, and his second wife, Anne Armine, daughter of Sir William Armine, 2nd Baronet. They had at least six children:

- Anthony Grey, Earl of Harold (1695–1723). Married Lady Mary Tufton, a daughter of Thomas Tufton, 6th Earl of Thanet, and Lady Catharine Cavendish.
- Henry Grey (c. 1696 – 1717).
- Amabel Grey (died 2 March 1726). Married John Campbell, 3rd Earl of Breadalbane and Holland.
- Jemima Grey (c. 1699 – 7 July 1731). Married John Ashburnham, 1st Earl of Ashburnham.
- Anne Grey (died 20 September 1733). Married Lord Charles Cavendish.
- Mary Grey. Married David Gregory of Christ Church.

He married secondly Lady Sophia Bentinck (died 5 June 1741) on 24 March 1729, a daughter of William Bentinck, 1st Earl of Portland, and his second wife Jane Martha Temple. They had a son and a daughter:

- George Grey, Earl of Harold (c. 1732 – 1733)
- Anne Sophia Grey (died 24 March 1780). Married John Egerton, Bishop of Durham.

== Sources ==
- The Complete Peerage

Political offices
Preceded by The Earl of Jersey	Lord Chamberlain; 1704–1710	Succeeded by The Duke of Shrewsbury
Preceded by The Duke of Devonshire	Lord Steward; 1716–1718	Succeeded by The Duke of Argyll
Preceded by The Duke of Kingston	Lord Privy Seal; 1719–1720	Succeeded by The Duke of Kingston
Honorary titles
Preceded by The Duke of Shrewsbury	Lord Lieutenant of Herefordshire; 1704–1714	Succeeded by The Lord Coningsby
Preceded by The Duke of Bedford	Lord Lieutenant of Bedfordshire; 1711–1740	Vacant Title next held by The Duke of Bedford
Preceded by The Earl Bolingbroke	Custos Rotulorum of Bedfordshire; 1711–1740	Vacant Title next held by The Duke of Bedford
Preceded by The Earl of Bridgewater	Lord Lieutenant of Buckinghamshire; 1711–1712	Succeeded by The Viscount Newhaven
Peerage of Great Britain
New creation	Duke of Kent; 1710–1740	Extinct
New creation	Marquess Grey; 1740	Succeeded by Jemima Yorke
Peerage of England
New creation	Marquess of Kent; 1706–1740	Extinct
Preceded by Anthony Grey	Earl of Kent; 1702–1740; Member of the House of Lords (1702–1740)	Extinct
Preceded by Mary Grey	Baron Lucas (descended by acceleration); 1702–1718	Succeeded by Anthony Grey
Preceded by Anthony Grey	Baron Lucas; 1723–1740	Succeeded by Jemima Yorke
