= Duke of Kent =

Title in the peerage of the United Kingdom

Dukedom of Kent
- Arms of Prince Edward, Duke of Kent
- Creation date: 12 October 1934
- Creation: Second
- Created by: King George V
- Peerage: Peerage of the United Kingdom
- First holder: Henry Grey
- Present holder: Prince Edward
- Heir apparent: George Windsor, Earl of St Andrews
- Remainder to: the 1st Duke's heirs male of the body lawfully begotten
- Subsidiary titles: Earl of St Andrews; Baron Downpatrick
- Status: Extant
- Seat: Wren House
- Former seat: Coppins

Duke of Kent is a title that has been created several times in the peerages of Great Britain and the United Kingdom, most recently as a royal dukedom for the fourth son of King George V. Since 1942, the title has been held by Prince Edward (born 1935), a first cousin of Queen Elizabeth II.

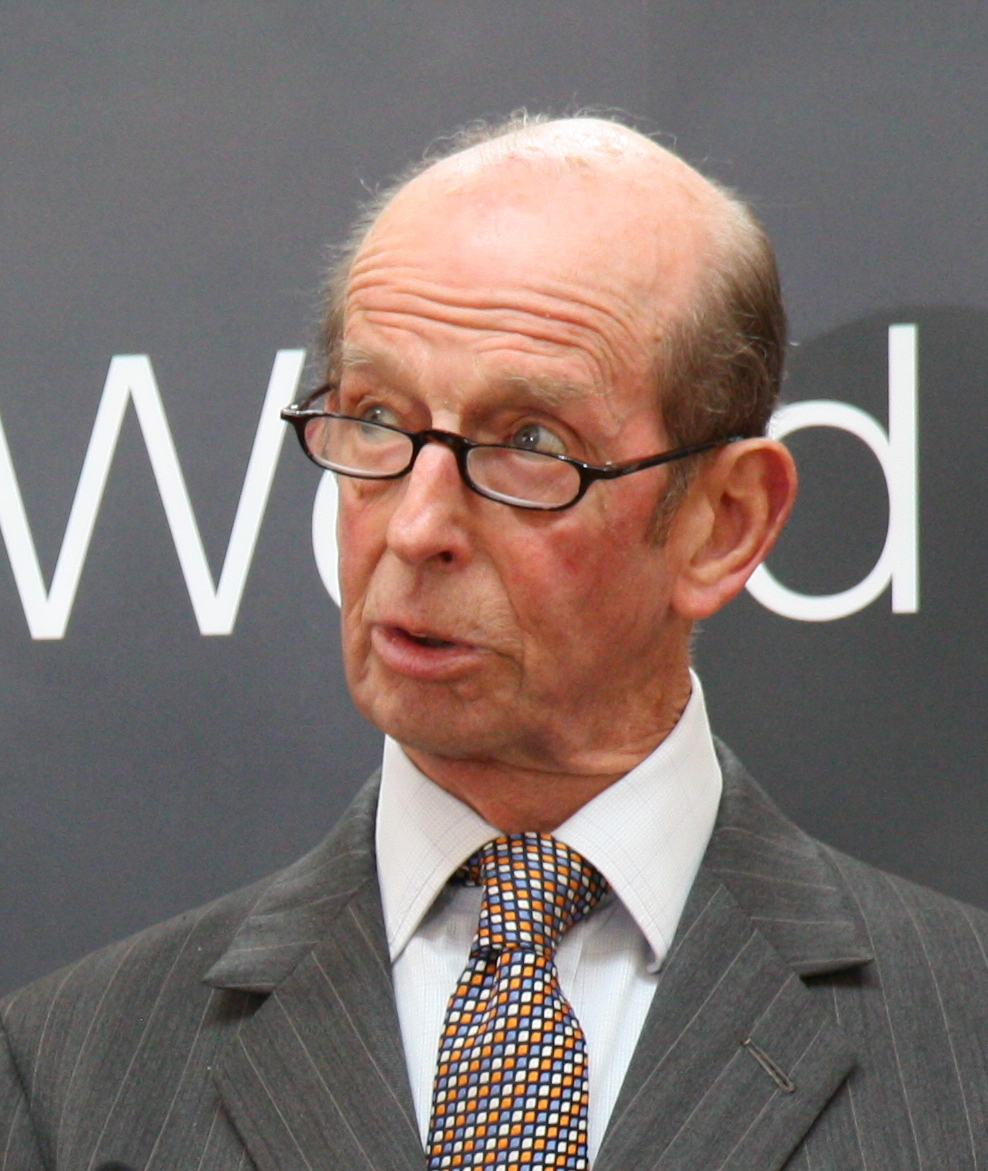
Prince Edward, the current Duke of Kent

== Earliest history ==
A title associated with Kent first appears anciently with the Kingdom of Kent (or Cantware), one of the seven Anglo-Saxon kingdoms that later merged to form the Kingdom of England. The Kings of Cantware (or Kent) date back to about 449. After 825, when the Kingdom of Kent was taken over by Egbert, King of Wessex, Kent became a dependency of Wessex and was ruled by sub-kings, usually related to the Wessex rulers. The titular kingship became something like the heir-apparent's title, as Aethelwulf, Egbert's son, became King of Kent in 825. By 860, Kent lost its status as a kingdom, becoming absorbed into Wessex.

== Earls of Kent ==
The first title of Kent was that of the Earl of Kent in the Peerage of England. After the death of Godwin, Earl of Wessex, his son Leofwine (c. 1035–1066) became Earl of Kent sometime between 1056 and 1058.

After Leofwine's death at Hastings in 1066, William the Conqueror named his half-brother, Odo of Bayeux (c. 1036–1097), who was also Bishop of Bayeux, the new Earl of Kent. However, Odo was twice removed from this title. The first occasion was in 1082, when he was imprisoned; the second was in 1088, after aiding in the Rebellion of 1088, after which he fled England.

It was not until 1141 that the title returned, this time for William de Ipres; but he was deprived of the title in 1155. In 1227, it was revived for Hubert de Burgh, but became extinct with his death. In 1321, it was again revived for Edmund of Woodstock, and through the marriage of Joan Plantagenet to Thomas Holland, the title passed to the Holland family, which held the title until 1408. In 1461, it was revived for William Neville, and then in 1465 for Edmund Grey. The Grey family held the title until Henry Grey, 12th Earl of Kent, who was made Marquess of Kent in 1706 and Duke of Kent in 1710, died without male heirs in 1740. Just before he died, he was awarded an inferior replacement title of Marquess De Grey to allow this to be passed to his heir - his granddaughter (the Dukedom could not be inherited).

== Marquess, former Duke of Kent ==
Henry Grey (1671–1740) succeeded his father, Anthony Grey, as the 12th Earl of Kent in 1702. In 1706, he was elevated to Marquess of Kent, along with Earl of Harold and Viscount Goderich. In 1710 he was elevated once again as Duke of Kent, and following the death of his sons, Marquess Grey (1740) with a special remainder to his granddaughter. Henry had one son and five daughters with his first wife, Jemima Crew (d. 1728), and one son and one daughter with his second wife, Sophia Bentinck (d. 1741). By the time of Henry's death in 1740, both of his sons had died, Anthony (in 1723) and George (in 1733), leaving the Duke of Kent without a male heir. His granddaughter Lady Jemima Campbell would inherit two titles in her own right, Marchioness Grey and Baroness Lucas; but all Henry's other titles, particularly Duke of Kent, became extinct with his death.

== Royal dukedom (1799) ==
On 23 April 1799 the double dukedom of Kent and Strathearn was given, with the earldom of Dublin, to King George III's fourth son, Prince Edward Augustus. Edward had only one legitimate child, a daughter, Princess Alexandrina Victoria (the future Queen Victoria). Upon Edward's death in 1820, the dukedom of Kent and Strathearn became extinct, as he had no legitimate male heir.

== Royal earldom (1866) ==
The next creation of a title of Kent was not that of Duke or Marquess, but rather that of Earl, with the creation of Prince Alfred (1844–1900), the second son of Queen Victoria and Prince Albert, as Duke of Edinburgh, Earl of Ulster, and of Kent in 1866. The Duke of Edinburgh (who later became the reigning Duke of Saxe-Coburg-Gotha) had only one son, Prince Alfred, who would have inherited his father's titles had he not died before his father in 1899. With Prince Alfred's death in 1900, the earldom became extinct.

== Royal dukedom (1934) ==
In 1934, Prince George (1902–1942), the fourth son of King George V of the United Kingdom and Queen Mary, was created Duke of Kent, Earl of St Andrews and Baron Downpatrick. Prince George had three children before his death in 1942: Prince Edward, Princess Alexandra, and Prince Michael. Prince Edward, upon his father's death, succeeded to his father's peerages.

The current Duke of Kent has two sons. King George V's letters patent of 30 November 1917 restricted the style Royal Highness and the titular dignity of Prince to the sons of the sovereign, the male line grandsons of the sovereign, and the eldest living son of the eldest son of the Prince of Wales. Great-grandchildren of the sovereign in the male line enjoy the courtesy titles of the children of dukes. Therefore, the heir-apparent to the dukedom of Kent is George, Earl of St. Andrews (b. 1962). Lord St. Andrews married in 1988, and has three children. His son Lord Downpatrick (b. 1988) is second in line to his grandfather's peerages. When Lord St. Andrews succeeds, the dukedom will cease to be a royal dukedom; as a great-grandson of a sovereign he will be styled His Grace The Duke of Kent. After Lord St. Andrews and Lord Downpatrick, the current duke's younger son Lord Nicholas Windsor (along with his sons) is in remainder to the dukedom, as are the current duke's brother, Prince Michael of Kent, and his son, Lord Frederick Windsor.

== Coat of arms ==
The coat of arms anciently associated with Kent is that of a rampant white horse upon a red field. This is primarily associated with the Kingdom of Kent and possibly the earldom as well. Today, this is seen on the Council of Kent's arms and flag. As a direct descendant of Queen Victoria, this is not the coat of arms of the present Duke of Kent. The coat of arms of the Duke of Kent consists of the following:

- Arms: those of the Royal Arms, differenced by a label of five points argent (silver, often depicted as white), the points charged with an anchor azure (blue) and a cross gules (red) alternately.
- Crest: On a coronet of four crosses-patées alternated with four strawberry leaves a lion statant guardant or (gold), crowned with the like coronet and differenced with a label as in the Arms.
- Supporters: The Royal Supporters differenced with the like coronet (as in the crest) and label as in the arms.

The standard of the Duke of Kent is a flag version of his arms. The personal badge of the present Duke of Kent is 'E' encircled by the garter of the Order of the Garter, surmounted by a Type IV Princes coronet as in the Crest.

== Formal residence ==
The Duke of Kent currently lives at Wren House in the grounds of Kensington Palace, but his office is based at York House at St James's Palace.

== Dukes of Kent ==
=== First creation, 1710 ===
Also: Marquess Grey (1740), Marquess of Kent (1706), Earl of Kent (1465), Earl of Harold and Viscount Goderich (1706), and Baron Lucas of Crudwell (1663)

Duke	Portrait	Birth	Marriage(s)	Death	Arms
Henry Grey; 1710–1740	Henry Grey	1671 son of Anthony Grey and Mary Lucas	(1) Hon. Jemima Crew; 1695; 10 children (2) Lady Sophia Bentinck; 24 March 1729; 2 children	1740	

Henry Grey had no surviving sons, and all his titles except the Marquessate of Grey and the Barony Lucas became extinct on his death.

=== Second creation, 1934 ===
Also: Earl of St Andrews and Baron Downpatrick (1934)

Duke	Portrait	Birth	Marriage(s)	Death	Arms
Prince George; 1934–1942	Prince George	20 December 1902; York Cottage, Sandringham Son of King George V and Queen Mary	Princess Marina of Greece and Denmark; 29 November 1934; 3 children	25 August 1942; Dunbeath; 39 years, 248 days	
Prince Edward; 1942–present	Prince Edward	9 October 1935; Belgrave Square, London Son of Prince George and Princess Marina	Katharine Worsley; 8 June 1961; 3 children	– now 91 years, 43 days old	

== Line of succession ==
- Prince George, Duke of Kent (1902–1942)
  - Prince Edward, Duke of Kent (born 1935)
    - (1) George Windsor, Earl of St Andrews (b. 1962)
      - (2) Edward Windsor, Lord Downpatrick (b. 1988)
    - (3) Lord Nicholas Windsor (b. 1970)
      - (4) Albert Louis Philip Edward Windsor (b. 2007)
      - (5) Leopold Ernest Augustus Guelph Windsor (b. 2009)
      - (6) Louis Arthur Nicholas Felix Windsor (b. 2014)
  - (7) Prince Michael of Kent (b. 1942)
    - (8) Lord Frederick Windsor (b. 1979)

== Family trees ==
Family tree of the Dukes, Marquesseses, and Earls of Kent, Dukes of Kent and Strathearn, and Dukes of Connaught and Strathearn, and other related titles

Earl of Kent (1st creation), 1020
Godwin, Earl of Wessex c. 1001–1053; 1st Earl of Kent	Herleva d. 1050
Earl of Kent (2nd creation), 1067
King Harold Godwinson c. 1022–1066	Leofwine Godwinson c. 1035–1066; 2nd Earl of Kent	King William I c. 1028–1087	Odo of Bayeux d. 1097; Earl of Kent
Earldom (1st creation) forfeit, 1066	Earldom (2nd creation) forfeit, 1088	Earl of Kent (3rd creation), 1141
William of Ypres c. 1090–1165; Earl of Kent
Earldom (3rd creation) forfeit, 1155	Earl of Kent (4th creation), 1227
Hubert de Burgh c. 1170–1243; Earl of Kent
King Edward I 1239–1307	Earldom (4th creation) extinct, 1243
King Edward II; 1284–1327
Earl of Kent (5th creation), 1321
King Edward III; 1312–1377	Edmund of Woodstock; 1301–1330; 1st Earl of Kent
Earldom (5th creation) attainted, 1330
Earldom (5th creation) restored, 1330	Baron Holand (2nd creation), 1353; Earl of Kent (6th creation), 1360
Edmund c. 1326–1331; 2nd Earl of Kent	John of Gaunt; 1340–1399; Duke of Lancaster	Edward the Black Prince; 1330–1376; Prince of Wales, Duke of Cornwall	Joan of Kent c. 1328–1385; Princess of Wales, 4th Countess of Kent suo jure 5th Baroness Wake of Liddell	Thomas Holland c. 1314–1360; 1st Earl of Kent, etc.	John; 1330–1352; 3rd Earl of Kent; 4th Baron Wake of Liddell
Earldom (5th creation) extinct, 1360
Elizabeth of Lancaster bef. 1363–1426	John Holland c. 1352–1400; Earl of Huntingdon, Duke of Exeter	Thomas Holland; 1350–1397; 2nd Earl of Kent, etc.
Constance Holland; 1387–1437	Thomas Holland; 1372–1400; 3rd Earl of Kent, etc. Duke of Surrey
Edmund Holland; 1383–1408; 4th Earl of Kent, etc.
Earl of Kent (7th creation), 1461	Earl of Kent (8th creation), 1465	Earldom (6th creation) extinct and Barony Holand (2nd creation) abeyant, 1408
William Neville c. 1405–1463; Earl of Kent; Baron Fauconberg jure uxoris	Edmund Grey; 1416–1490; 1st Earl of Kent; 4th Baron Grey de Ruthyn
Earldom (7th creation) extinct, 1463
Anne Woodville c. 1438–1489	George Grey c. 1460–1503; 2nd Earl of Kent; 5th Baron Grey de Ruthyn
Richard Grey; 1481–1524; 3rd Earl of Kent; 6th Baron Grey de Ruthyn	Anthony Grey	Henry Grey c. 1495–1562; 4th Earl of Kent; 7th Baron Grey de Ruthyn
George Grey	Henry Grey; 1520–1545
Anthony Grey; 1557–1643; 9th Earl of Kent	Reginald Grey d. 1573; 5th Earl of Kent; 8th Baron Grey de Ruthyn	Henry Grey; 1541–1615; 6th Earl of Kent; 9th Baron Grey de Ruthyn	Charles Grey c. 1545–1623; 7th Earl of Kent; 10th Baron Grey de Ruthyn
Henry Grey; 1594–1651; 10th Earl of Kent	Henry Grey c. 1583–1639; 8th Earl of Kent; 11th Baron Grey de Ruthyn
Baron Lucas (2nd creation), 1663
Mary (Lucas) Grey d. 1702; 1st Baroness Lucas of Crudwell	Anthony Grey; 1645–1702; 11th Earl of Kent
Marquess of Kent, Earl of Harold, and Viscount Goderich (1st creation), 1706; Duke of Kent (1st creation), 1710; Marquess Grey, 1740
Henry Grey; 1671–1740; Duke of Kent, etc., 1st Marquess Grey; 12th Earl of Kent; 2nd Baron Lucas of Crudwell
Earldom (8th creation), Marquessate, and Dukedom of Kent, Earldom of Harold, and Viscountcy Goderich (1st creation) extinct, 1740
Anthony Grey; 1695–1723; 3rd Baron Lucas, styled Earl of Harold	Amabel Grey
Jemima (Campbell) Yorke; 1723–1797; 2nd Marchioness Grey, 4th Baroness Lucas	King George III; 1738–1820
Marquessate Grey extinct, 1797
Earl de Grey, 1816 (not the same as Earl Grey)	Earl of Dublin (1st creation), 1766	Duke of Kent and Strathearn and Earl of Dublin (2nd creation), 1799	See also: Earl of Strathearn
Amabel Hume-Campbell; 1751–1833; 1st Countess de Grey	Mary Jemima Yorke; 1757–1830	Prince Henry Frederick; 1745–1790; Earl of Dublin	Prince Edward Augustus; 1767–1820; Duke of Kent and Strathearn, etc.
Earldom of Dublin (1st creation) extinct, 1790	Dukedom of Kent and Strathearn and Earldom of Dublin (2nd creation) extinct, 1820
Viscount Goderich (2nd creation), 1827; Earl of Ripon, 1833
Thomas Philip (Robinson) de Grey; 1781–1859; 2nd Earl de Grey	Frederick John Robinson; 1782–1859; 1st Earl of Ripon, etc.	Queen Victoria; 1819–1901
Marquess of Ripon, 1871	Earl of Dublin (3rd creation), 1849/1850	Earl of Kent (9th creation), 1866	Duke of Connaught and Strathearn, 1874
George Robinson; 1827–1909; 1st Marquess of Ripon, 2nd Earl of Ripon, etc., 3rd Earl de Grey, 4th Baron Grantham	Albert Edward, Prince of Wales; 1841–1910; Earl of Dublin later King Edward VII	Prince Alfred Ernest Albert; 1844–1900; Duke of Edinburgh, Duke of Saxe-Coburg and Gotha, Earl of Kent	Prince Arthur; 1850–1942; 1st Duke of Connaught and Strathearn
Earldom of Dublin merged in the Crown, 1901
(Frederick) Oliver Robinson; 1852–1923; 2nd Marquess of Ripon, 3rd Earl of Ripon, etc., 4th Earl de Grey, 5th Baron Grantham	King George V 1865–1936	Prince Arthur of Connaught; 1883–1938
Marquessate and Earldom of Ripon, Earldom de Grey, Viscountcy Goderich, and Barony Grantham extinct, 1923
Duke of Kent (2nd creation), Earl of St Andrews, and Baron Downpatrick, 1934
Prince George; 1902–1942; 1st Duke of Kent, etc.	Prince Alastair Arthur; 1914–1943; 2nd Duke of Connaught and Strathearn
Dukedom of Connaught and Strathearn extinct, 1943
Prince Edward b. 1935; 2nd Duke of Kent, etc.	7) Prince Michael of Kent b. 1942
1) George Philip Nicholas Windsor b. 1962 styled Earl of St Andrews and heir apparent to the dukedom of Kent	3) Nicholas Charles Edward Jonathan Windsor b. 1970	8) Frederick Michael George David Louis Windsor b. 1979
2) Edward Edmund Maximilian George Windsor b. 1988 styled Lord Downpatrick	4) Albert Louis Philip Edward Windsor b. 2007	5) Leopold Ernest Augustus Guelph Windsor b. 2009	6) Louis Arthur Nicholas Felix Windsor b. 2014

Family tree of British royal dukes

Includes dukes of: Albany, Albemarle, Bedford, Cambridge, Clarence, Connaught and Strathearn, Cumberland, Edinburgh, Gloucester, Gloucester and Edinburgh, Hereford, Kent, Kintyre and Lorne, Norfolk, Ross, Somerset, Sussex, Windsor, and York, but only when royally.

Non-royal dukes are not included; see Royal dukedoms in the United Kingdom.
Also not included are titles mandated for use by the heir apparent (Duke of Rothesay and the 1337 creation of the Duke of Cornwall), see Princes of Wales family tree.

King Robert II; 1316–1390	King Edward III; 1312–1377
Duke of Albany (1st creation), 1398	Duke of Clarence (1st creation), 1362	Duke of York (1st creation), 1385
King Robert III c. 1337–1406	Robert Stewart c. 1340–1420; 1st Duke of Albany	Edward the Black Prince; 1330–1376	Lionel of Antwerp; 1338–1368; Duke of Clarence	John of Gaunt; 1340–1399	Edmund; 1341–1402; 1st Duke of York
Dukedom of Clarence (1st creation) extinct, 1368
Duke of Cornwall (2nd creation), 1376	Duke of Hereford, 1397	Duke of Gloucester (1st creation), 1385
Murdoch Stewart c. 1362–1425; 2nd Duke of Albany	Richard of Bordeaux; 1367–1400; Duke of Cornwall, later King Richard II	Henry Bolingbroke; 1367–1413; Duke of Hereford, later King Henry IV	Thomas of Woodstock; 1355–1397; Duke of Gloucester
Dukedom of Albany (1st creation) forfeit, 1425	Dukedom of Cornwall (2nd creation) merged in the crown, 1377	Dukedom of Hereford merged in the crown, 1399	Dukedom of Gloucester (1st creation) extinct, 1397
Duke of Clarence (2nd creation), 1412	Duke of Bedford (1st & 2nd creations), 1414	Duke of Gloucester (2nd creation), 1414	Duke of Albemarle (Aumale) (1st creation), 1397
Thomas of Lancaster; 1387–1421; Duke of Clarence	John of Lancaster; 1389–1435; Duke of Bedford; Surrendered dukedom and then regranted, 1433	Humphrey of Lancaster; 1390–1447; Duke of Gloucester	John Beaufort; 1373–1410	Joan Beaufort c. 1379–1440	Edward of Norwich c. 1373–1415; Duke of Aumale, 2nd Duke of York	Richard of Conisburgh; 1385–1415
Dukedom of Clarence (2nd creation) extinct, 1421	Dukedom of Bedford (2nd creation) extinct, 1435	Dukedom of Gloucester (2nd creation) extinct, 1447	Dukedom of Albemarle (Aumale) (1st creation) forfeit, 1399
Duke of York (1st creation) restored, 1425; Duke of Cornwall (3rd creation), 1460
King James I 1394–1437	Joan Beaufort c. 1404–1445	Owen Tudor c. 1400–1461	John Beaufort; 1404–1444	Richard Neville; 1400–1460	Cecily Neville; 1415–1495	Richard of York; 1411–1460; 3rd Duke of York, Duke of Cornwall
Duke of Cornwall (3rd creation) extinct, 1460
Duke of Bedford (5th creation), 1485	Duke of Clarence (3rd creation), 1461	Duke of Gloucester (3rd creation), 1461
King James II; 1430–1460	Jasper Tudor c. 1431–1495; Duke of Bedford	Edmund Tudor c. 1430–1456	Lady Margaret Beaufort; 1443–1509	John Neville c. 1431–1471	Elizabeth Woodville c. 1437–1492	Edward; 1442–1483; 4th Duke of York, later King Edward IV	George Plantagenet; 1449–1478; Duke of Clarence	Richard of York; 1452–1485; Duke of Gloucester, later King Richard III
Dukedom of Bedford (5th creation) extinct, 1495	Dukedom of York (1st creation) merged in the Crown, 1461	Dukedom of Clarence (3rd creation) forfeit, 1478	Dukedom of Gloucester (3rd creation) merged in the Crown, 1483
Duke of Albany (2nd creation), 1458	Duke of Bedford (3rd creation), 1470	Duke of York (2nd creation), 1474; Duke of Norfolk (3rd creation), 1477	Duke of Bedford (4th creation), 1478
Alexander Stewart c. 1454–1485; 1st Duke of Albany	King James III; 1451/1452–1488	George Neville; 1457–1483; Duke of Bedford	King Henry VII; 1457–1509	Elizabeth of York; 1466–1503	Richard of Shrewsbury; 1473–1483; Duke of York, Duke of Norfolk	George of York; 1477–1479; Duke of Bedford
Dukedom of Bedford (3rd creation) forfeit, 1478	Dukedom of York (2nd creation) and Dukedom of Norfolk (3rd creation) extinct, 1483	Dukedom of Bedford (4th creation) extinct, 1479
Duke of Ross (1st creation), 1488	Duke of York (3rd creation), 1494	Duke of Somerset (3rd creation), 1499
John Stewart; 1482–1536; 2nd Duke of Albany	James Stewart; 1476–1504; Duke of Ross	King James IV; 1473–1513	Margaret Tudor; 1489–1541	Henry; 1491–1547; Duke of York, later King Henry VIII	Edmund Tudor; 1499–1500; Duke of Somerset (nominated but probably not invested)
Dukedom of Albany (2nd creation) extinct, 1536	Dukedom of Ross (1st creation) extinct, 1504	Dukedom of York (3rd creation) merged in the Crown, 1509	Dukedom of Somerset (3rd creation) extinct, 1500
Duke of Ross (2nd creation), 1514
King James V 1512–1542	Alexander Stewart; 1514–1515; Duke of Ross
Duke of Albany (3rd creation), 1565	Dukedom of Ross (2nd creation) extinct, 1515
Henry Stuart; 1546–1567; 1st Duke of Albany	Queen Mary; 1542–1587
James; 1566–1625; 2nd Duke of Albany, later King James VI & I
Dukedom of Albany (3rd creation) merged in the Crown, 1567
Duke of Albany (4th creation), 1604; Duke of York (4th creation), 1605	Duke of Kintyre and Lorne, 1602
Elizabeth Stuart; 1596–1662	Henry Frederick; 1594–1612	Charles; 1600–1649; Duke of Albany, Duke of York, later King Charles I	Robert Stuart; 1602; Duke of Kintyre and Lorne
Dukedom of Albany (4th creation), Dukedom of York (4th creation) merged in the Crown, 1625	Dukedom of Kintyre and Lorne extinct, 1602
Duke of York (5th creation) 1644; Duke of Albany (5th creation), 1660	Duke of Gloucester (4th creation), 1659
Sophia of Hanover; 1630–1714	James Stuart; 1633–1701; Duke of York, Duke of Albany, later King James VII & II	Henry; 1640–1660; Duke of Gloucester
Dukedom of Albany (5th creation) and Dukedom of York (5th creation) merged in the Crown, 1685	Dukedom of Gloucester (4th creation) extinct, 1660
Duke of York and Albany (1st creation), 1716	Duke of Cambridge (1st creation), 1664	Duke of Kendal (1st creation), 1666	Duke of Cambridge (2nd creation), 1667
King George I 1660–1727	Ernest Augustus; 1674–1728; Duke of York and Albany	Charles Stuart; 1660–1661 styled Duke of Cambridge	James Stuart; 1663–1667; Duke of Cambridge	Queen Anne; 1665–1714	Charles Stuart; 1666–1667 designated Duke of Kendal	Edgar Stuart; 1667–1671; Duke of Cambridge	Charles Stuart; 1677 styled Duke of Cambridge
Dukedom of York and Albany (1st creation) extinct, 1728	Dukedom of Cambridge (1st creation) extinct, 1667	Dukedom of Kendal (1st creation), extinct, 1667	Dukedom of Cambridge (2nd creation) extinct, 1671
Duke of Cambridge (3rd creation)
George; 1683–1760; Duke of Cambridge, later King George II	William; 1689–1700 styled Duke of Gloucester
Dukedom of Cambridge (3rd creation) merged with the Crown, 1727
Duke of Edinburgh (1st creation), 1726	Duke of Cumberland (3rd creation), 1726
Frederick; 1707–1751; 1st Duke of Edinburgh, styled Duke of Gloucester until created Duke of Edinburgh	William Augustus; 1721–1765; Duke of Cumberland
Dukedom of Cumberland (3rd creation) extinct, 1765
Duke of York and Albany (2nd creation), 1760	Duke of Gloucester and Edinburgh, 1764	Duke of Cumberland and Strathearn, 1766
George; 1738–1820; 2nd Duke of Edinburgh, later King George III	Edward; 1739–1767; Duke of York and Albany	William Henry; 1743–1805; 1st Duke of Gloucester and Edinburgh	Henry; 1745–1790; Duke of Cumberland and Strathearn
Dukedom of Edinburgh (1st creation), merged in the Crown, 1760	Dukedom of York and Albany (2nd creation) extinct, 1767	Dukedom of Cumberland and Strathearn extinct, 1790
Duke of York and Albany (3rd creation), 1784	Duke of Clarence and St Andrews, 1789	Duke of Kent and Strathearn, 1799	Duke of Cumberland and Teviotdale, 1799	Duke of Sussex (1st creation), 1801	Duke of Cambridge (4th creation), 1801
Frederick; 1763–1827; Duke of York and Albany	William Henry; 1765–1837, Duke of Clarence and St Andrews, later King William IV	Edward; 1767–1820; Duke of Kent and Strathearn	Ernest Augustus; 1771–1851; King of Hanover, 1st Duke of Cumberland and Teviotdale	Augustus Frederick; 1773–1843; Duke of Sussex	Adolphus; 1774–1850; 1st Duke of Cambridge	Mary; 1776–1857	William Frederick; 1776–1834; 2nd Duke of Gloucester and Edinburgh
Dukedom of York and Albany (3rd creation) extinct, 1827	Dukedom of Clarence and St Andrews merged in the Crown, 1830	Dukedom of Kent and Strathearn extinct, 1820	Dukedom of Sussex (1st creation) extinct, 1843	Dukedom of Gloucester and Edinburgh extinct, 1834
Queen Victoria; 1819–1901	George V 1819–1878; King of Hanover, 2nd Duke of Cumberland and Teviotdale	George; 1819–1904; 2nd Duke of Cambridge	Mary Adelaide; 1833–1897
Dukedom of Cambridge (4th creation) extinct, 1904
Duke of Edinburgh (2nd creation), 1866	Duke of Connaught and Strathearn, 1874	Duke of Albany (6th creation), 1881
King Edward VII; 1841–1910	Ernest Augustus; 1845–1923; 3rd Duke of Cumberland and Teviotdale	Alice; 1843–1878	Alfred Ernest Albert; 1844–1900; Duke of Edinburgh	Arthur; 1850–1942; 1st Duke of Connaught and Strathearn	Leopold; 1853–1884; 1st Duke of Albany
Dukedom of Cumberland and Teviotdale forfeit, 1919	Dukedom of Edinburgh (2nd creation) extinct, 1900
Duke of Clarence and Avondale, 1890	Duke of York (6th creation), 1892
Albert Victor; 1864–1892; Duke of Clarence and Avondale	George; 1865–1936; Duke of York, later King George V	Mary of Teck; 1867–1953	Victoria of Hesse and by Rhine; 1863–1950	Arthur of Connaught; 1883–1938
Dukedom of Clarence and Avondale extinct, 1892	Dukedom of York (6th creation) merged in the Crown, 1910
Duke of Windsor, 1937	Duke of York (7th creation), 1920	Duke of Kent (2nd creation), 1934	Duke of Gloucester (5th creation), 1928
King Edward VIII; 1894–1972; Later Duke of Windsor	Albert; 1895–1952; Duke of York, later King George VI	Alice of Battenberg; 1885–1969	George; 1902–1942; 1st Duke of Kent	Henry; 1900–1974; 1st Duke of Gloucester	Alastair Arthur; 1914–1943; 2nd Duke of Connaught and Strathearn	Charles Edward; 1884–1954; 2nd Duke of Albany
Dukedom of Windsor extinct, 1972	Dukedom of York (7th creation) merged in the Crown, 1936	Dukedom of Connaught and Strathearn extinct, 1943	Dukedom of Albany (6th creation) forfeit, 1919
Duke of Edinburgh (3rd creation), 1947
Queen Elizabeth II; 1926–2022	Philip; 1921–2021; 1st Duke of Edinburgh	Edward b. 1935; 2nd Duke of Kent
Duke of York (8th creation), 1986 (revoked 2025)	Duke of Edinburgh (4th creation), 2023
Charles b. 1948; 2nd Duke of Edinburgh, later King Charles III	Andrew b. 1960; Duke of York	Edward b. 1964; Duke of Edinburgh	George Windsor b. 1962	Richard b. 1944; 2nd Duke of Gloucester
Dukedom of Edinburgh (3rd creation) merged in the Crown, 2022	No male heirs	Dukedom of Edinburgh (4th creation) is a life peerage and therefore not hereditary	Heir apparent to the Dukedom of Kent
Duke of Cambridge (5th creation), 2011	Duke of Sussex (2nd creation), 2018
William b. 1982; Duke of Cambridge	Harry b. 1984; Duke of Sussex	Edward Windsor b. 1988	Alexander Windsor b. 1974
Heir-apparent to the Dukedom of Gloucester
George of Wales b. 2013	Archie of Sussex b. 2019
Heir apparent to the Dukedom of Cambridge	Heir apparent to the Dukedom of Sussex

== See also ==
- Duchess of Kent
- British monarchy
- Kent

== Sources ==
- Bloom, Ursula (1969). The House of Kent. London: Robert Hale.
- Lawne, Penny (2010). "Edmund of Woodstock, Earl of Kent (1301–1330): a study of personal loyalty". In Chris Given-Wilson (ed.). Fourteenth Century England VI. Boydell & Brewer. pp. 27–48. ISBN 9781843835301.
- Powicke, F. Maurice; Fryde, E. B. (1961). Handbook of British Chronology (2nd ed.). London: Royal Historical Society.
