= Countess of Kent =

Countess of Kent is a title that may be held by a female in her own right or given to the wife of the Earl of Kent. Those who have held the title include:

== Countesses of Kent in their own right ==
- Joan of Kent (1328-1385), daughter of Edmund of Woodstock, 1st Earl of Kent, and mother of King Richard II of England

== Countesses of Kent by marriage ==
- Gytha Thorkelsdóttir (c.997–c.1069), wife of Godwin, Earl of Wessex
- Margaret of Scotland, Countess of Kent (1193–1259), wife of Hubert de Burgh, 1st Earl of Kent
- Margaret Wake, 3rd Baroness Wake of Liddell (c.1297-1349), wife of Edmund of Woodstock and mother of Joan of Kent
- Alice FitzAlan, Countess of Kent (c.1350-1416), wife of Thomas Holland, 2nd Earl of Kent
- Lucia Visconti (1372-1424), wife of Edmund Holland, 4th Earl of Kent
- Joan de Fauconberg, 6th Baroness Fauconberg (1406-1490), wife of William Neville, 1st Earl of Kent
- Lady Katherine Percy (1423–c.1475), wife of Edmund Grey, 1st Earl of Kent
- Anne Woodville (c.1438-1489), wife of George Grey, 2nd Earl of Kent
- Susan Bertie, Countess of Kent (1554-c.1596), wife of Reginald Grey, 5th Earl of Kent
- Elizabeth Grey, Countess of Kent (1582-1651), wife of Henry Grey, 8th Earl of Kent
- Mary Grey, Countess of Kent (died 1702), wife of Anthony Grey, 11th Earl of Kent
- Grand Duchess Maria Alexandrovna of Russia (1853-1920), wife of Alfred, Duke of Saxe-Coburg and Gotha
