= Katherine Brandon, Duchess of Suffolk =

English noblewoman and courtier (1519–1580)

Katherine Willoughby
- suo jure Baroness Willoughby de Eresby; Duchess of Suffolk
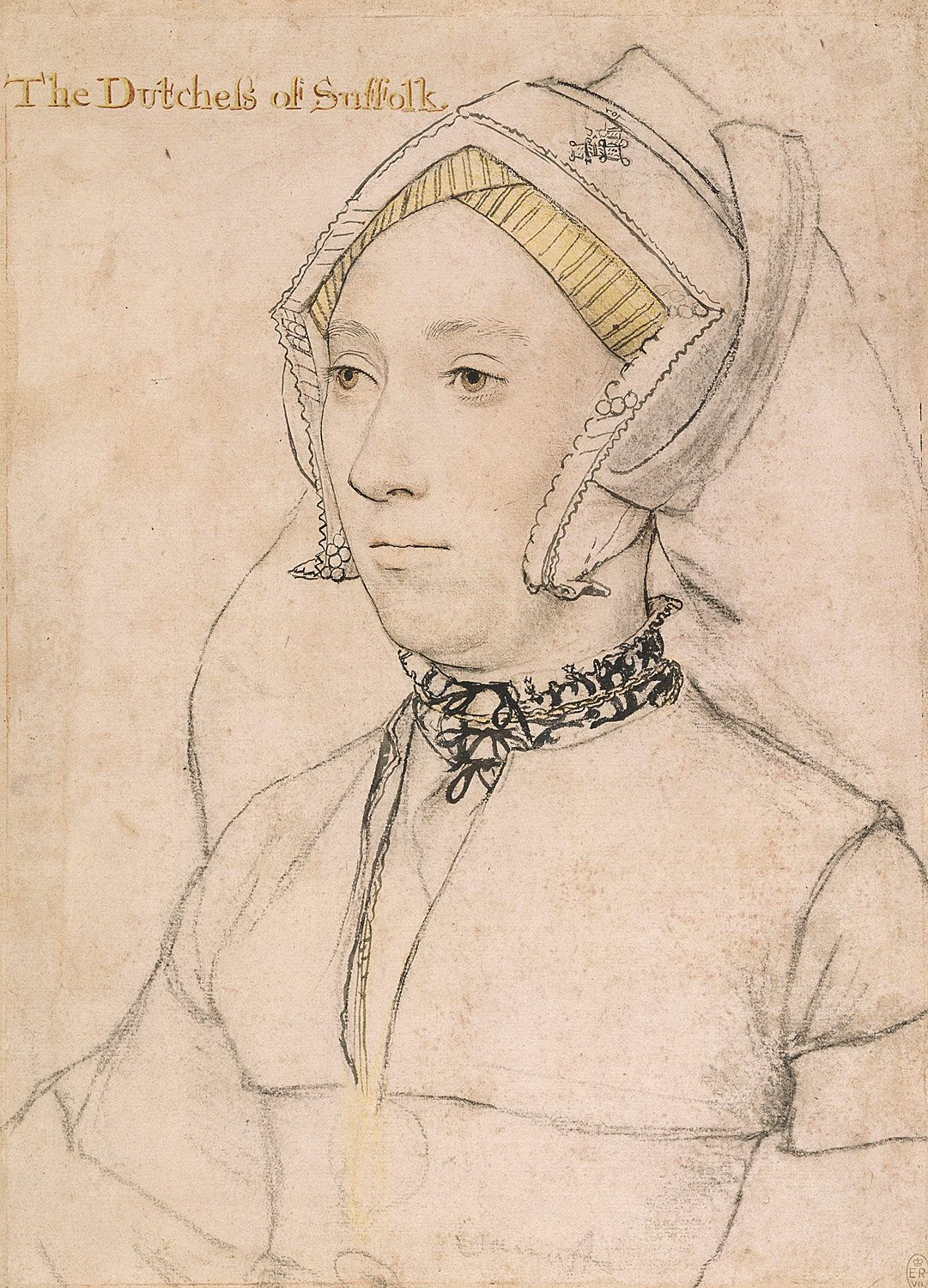
- Katherine Willoughby, drawing by Hans Holbein the Younger
- Born: 22 March 1519; Parham Old Hall, Suffolk, England
- Died: 19 September 1580 (aged 61); Grimsthorpe Castle, Lincolnshire, England
- Noble family: Willoughby
- Spouses: Charles Brandon, 1st Duke of Suffolk (m. 1533; died 1545) Richard Bertie (m. 1553)
- Issue: Henry Brandon, 2nd Duke of Suffolk; Charles Brandon, 3rd Duke of Suffolk; Susan Bertie, Countess of Kent; Peregrine Bertie, 13th Baron Willoughby de Eresby
- Father: William Willoughby, 11th Baron Willoughby de Eresby
- Mother: María de Salinas

Katherine Brandon, Duchess of Suffolk, suo jure 12th Baroness Willoughby de Eresby (née Willoughby; 22 March 1519 – 19 September 1580), was an English noblewoman living at the courts of King Henry VIII, King Edward VI, Queen Mary I and Queen Elizabeth I. She was the fourth wife of Charles Brandon, 1st Duke of Suffolk, who acted as her legal guardian during his third marriage to Henry VIII's sister Mary. Her second husband was Richard Bertie, a member of her household. Following Suffolk's death in 1545, it was rumoured that King Henry had considered marrying Katherine as his seventh wife, while he was still married to his sixth wife, Catherine Parr, who was Katherine's close friend.

An outspoken supporter of the English Reformation, she fled abroad to Wesel and later the Grand Duchy of Lithuania during the reign of the Catholic Queen Mary I, to avoid persecution.

== Family ==
Katherine Willoughby, born at Parham Old Hall, Suffolk, on 22 March 1519 and christened in the church there four days later, was the daughter of William Willoughby, 11th Baron Willoughby de Eresby, and his second wife, María de Salinas. Lord Willoughby's first wife, Mary Hussey, the daughter of William Hussey, Chief Justice of the King's Bench, had died childless before 1512, and in June 1516 he married María de Salinas. Doña María de Salinas had come to the English court with Henry VIII's Queen consort, Catherine of Aragon, and was one of the queen's ladies-in-waiting and closest friends. The king favoured another match bolstering his own marital alliance with Spain, and even named one of his warships the Mary Willoughby. It seems Katherine was named for the queen, but her mother's lifelong friendship with Catherine of Aragon did not prevent her daughter from becoming one of England's Marian exiles later in life.

Katherine had two brothers, Henry and Francis, who died as infants.

== Early life ==
According to Goff, Katherine likely spent her early childhood at Parham, as her mother was in almost constant attendance on Henry VIII's Queen, Catherine of Aragon. On 14 October 1526, when Katherine was seven years of age, Lord Willoughby died after falling ill during a visit to Suffolk and was buried at Mettingham. As his only surviving child, Katherine inherited the barony. Her father held some thirty manors in Lincolnshire, and almost the same number in Norfolk and Suffolk, worth over £900 per annum, and Katherine is said to have been 'one of the greatest heiresses of her generation'. However, her inheritance became a subject of dispute for many years, as there was doubt as to which lands had been settled on the heirs male and which on the heirs general, and the matter was further complicated by a deed which Lord Willoughby had drawn up before leaving for France to campaign in Henry VIII's wars in 1523. In 1527 Katherine's uncle, Sir Christopher Willoughby, accused his sister-in-law, Katherine's mother, María de Salinas, of withholding documents from him which established the title to various estates, and of having kept him out of possession of estates which rightfully belonged to him.

At her father's death, Katherine's wardship fell to the king, who on 1 March 1528 sold it to his brother-in-law Charles Brandon, 1st Duke of Suffolk. On acquiring Katherine's wardship, Suffolk immediately intervened in the family quarrel with a letter to Cardinal Wolsey, and his intervention appears to have cowed Sir Christopher Willoughby, who wrote to Wolsey that the Cardinal's anger was 'worse to him than death'.

Katherine is said to have been betrothed to Henry Brandon, 1st Earl of Lincoln (died 1534), Suffolk's son by his third wife, Mary Tudor. Mary Tudor died at Westhorpe, Suffolk, on 25 June 1533, and on 21 July the young Katherine was one of the chief mourners at her funeral. As early as 1531 it had been rumoured in the household of Henry VIII's future wife, Anne Boleyn, that Suffolk was personally interested in Katherine, and six weeks after Mary Tudor's death the Imperial Ambassador, Eustace Chapuys, reported to Charles V that:

On Sunday next the Duke of Suffolk will be married to the daughter of a Spanish lady named Lady Willoughby. She was promised to the Duke's son, but he is only ten years old, & although it is not worth writing to your Majesty, the novelty of the case made me mention it'.

Although Suffolk was forty-nine and Katherine only fourteen, the marriage was a financially successful one. The Willoughby inheritance was not fully settled until the reign of Queen Elizabeth I, but Suffolk was able to force Sir Christopher Willoughby to relinquish possession of some of the contested Willoughby estates, and Suffolk eventually became the greatest magnate in Lincolnshire. As such, he played an important role in quelling the Lincolnshire rebellion in 1536, and built an imposing residence at Grimsthorpe, which came into Katherine's possession at the death of Elizabeth de Vere, Dowager Countess of Oxford, widow of the 13th Earl.

The Duke and Duchess had two sons, Henry Brandon, 2nd Duke of Suffolk, born 18 September 1534 at Katherine's mother's house in the Barbican, and Charles Brandon, 3rd Duke of Suffolk, born 1537. The marriage brought Katherine into the extended royal family, because Henry VIII's will made his younger sister Mary Tudor's descendants the next heirs to the throne after his own children. The Duke and Duchess of Suffolk officially greeted Anne of Cleves when she arrived in England in 1539 to marry the king, and in 1541 they helped arrange a royal progress for the king and his next wife, Catherine Howard. This progress later became notorious for the queen's alleged adulterous trysts with her kinsman, Thomas Culpeper, though the duke and duchess's home at Grimsthorpe Castle was "one of the very few places on the route ... where Catherine Howard had not misbehaved herself".

== Personality and beliefs ==
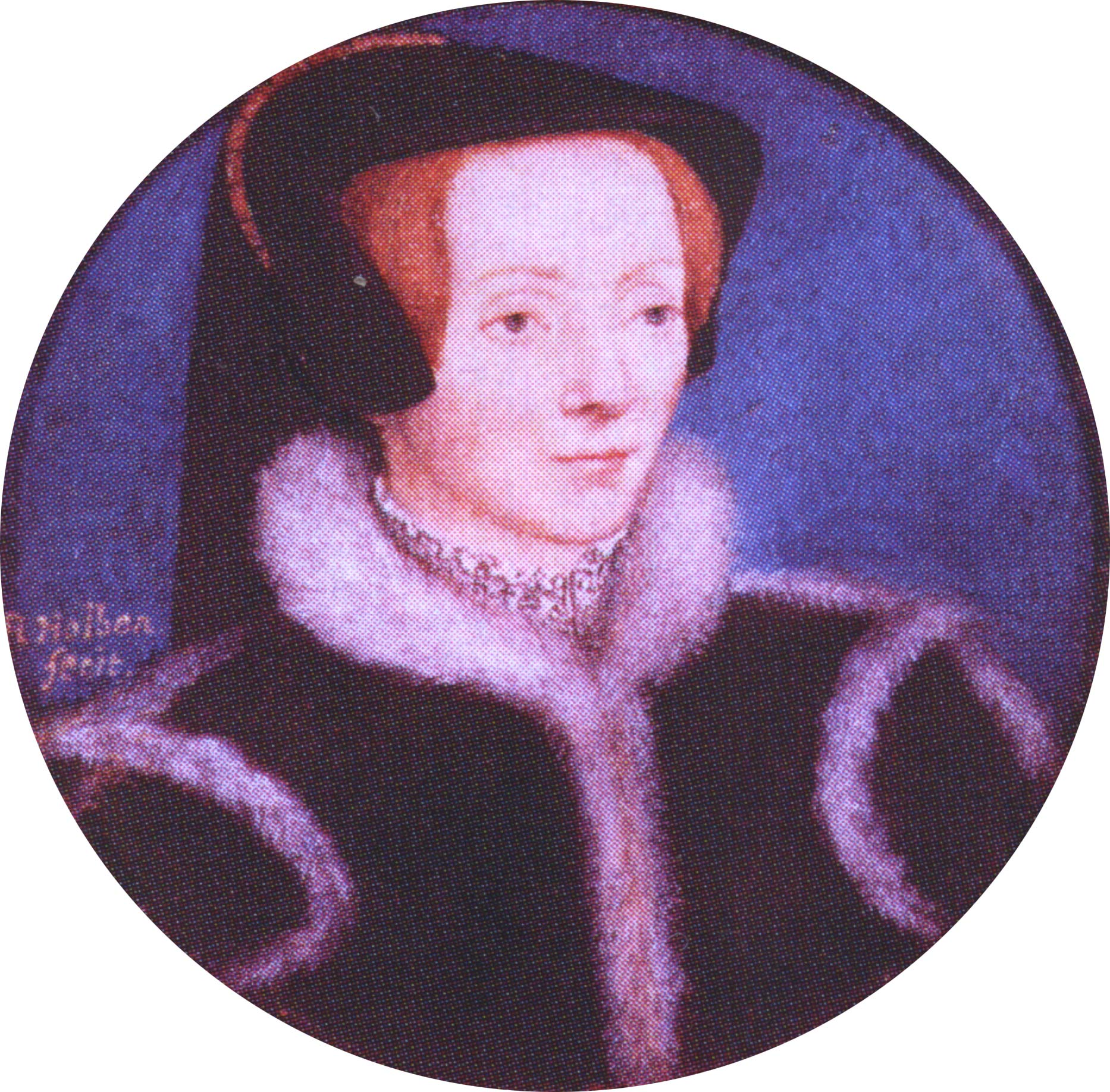
Miniature of Katherine Willoughby by Hans Holbein, the Younger

Noted for her wit, sharp tongue, and devotion to learning, by the last years of Henry VIII's reign the Duchess of Suffolk was also an outspoken advocate of the English Reformation. She became a close friend of Henry's last queen, Catherine Parr, particularly after the Duke died in 1545, and was a strong influence on the queen's religious beliefs. In 1546, as these views grew controversial, the king ordered the queen's arrest, though his wife managed to cajole him into cancelling this.

The Duchess of Suffolk once gave a banquet and during a party game afterwards named Bishop Gardiner as the man she loved least. She named her pet spaniel "Gardiner", provoking much amusement when she called her dog to heel. Several years later when Gardiner was imprisoned during the reign of King Edward VI, she is quoted as saying, "It was merry with the lambs when the wolf was shut up."

Suffolk died 22 August 1545, and it was rumoured that the king was considering the Duchess—still only in her mid-twenties—as his seventh wife. In February 1546, Van der Delft wrote: "I hesitate to report there are rumours of a new queen. Some attribute it to the sterility of the present Queen, while others say that there will be no change during the present war. Madame Suffolk is much talked about and is in great favour; but the king shows no alteration in his behaviour to the queen, although she is said to be annoyed by the rumour". But their friendship remained strong, and after Henry VIII's death in 1547, the Duchess helped fund the publication of one of Catherine Parr's books, The Lamentation of a Sinner. She also became a patron of John Day, England's leading religious publisher; Day printed various books with the Duchess of Suffolk's coat of arms from 1548 onward. Beginning in 1550, the Duchess helped establish stranger churches for foreign Protestants, principally Dutch, who were fleeing religious persecution on the Continent.

== After Henry VIII's death ==
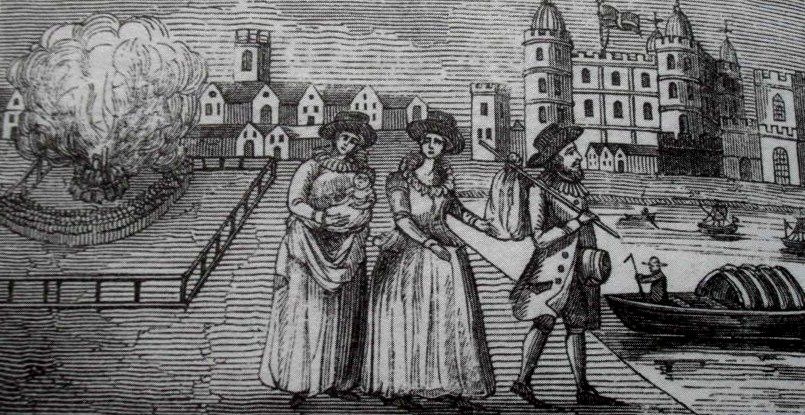
Engraving of Katherine, Bertie, their daughter and wetnurse going into exile.

The dowager queen Catherine Parr remarried to Thomas Seymour shortly after the death of the king. In August 1548, she gave birth to a daughter and died several days later, presumably of childbed fever. Upon her death, her widower went to London with their new baby daughter. Months later, Seymour was arrested, tried, and executed for treason. Their daughter, Mary, was left an orphan aged only seven months. The Duchess of Suffolk was appointed guardian. The Duchess could not support the young infant so she wrote to Sir William Cecil, asking for funds. The letter reflects her resentment towards the child. The letter was obviously taken into account for in January 1550, an act in Parliament was passed restoring Mary to what was left of her father's property. No claim was ever made and the queen's daughter seems to disappear from history at this time. Parr's biographer Linda Porter believes that the child died and was buried near the Duchess's estate in Grimsthorpe. Years later, the Duchess also became the custodian of one of her Brandon step-granddaughters, Lady Mary Grey, when the latter was placed under house arrest after marrying without royal consent.

In 1551 both the Duchess's teenage sons, Henry Brandon, 2nd Duke of Suffolk and Charles Brandon, 3rd Duke of Suffolk, already students at Cambridge, died within an hour of each other of the sweating sickness. Four months afterwards, attempting to reconcile herself to this tragedy, Katherine wrote to Sir William Cecil that “truly I take this [God's] last (and to the first sight most sharp and bitter) punishment not for the least of his benefits, in as much as I have never been so well taught by any other before to know his power, his love, and mercy, my own wickedness, and that wretched state that without him I should endure here”. In recovering from this misfortune and its severe test to her faith, Katherine built a new life. In this period she employed Hugh Latimer as her chaplain.

She married her second husband, Richard Bertie (25 December 1516 – 9 April 1582), a member of her household, out of love and shared religious beliefs, but she continued to be known as the Duchess of Suffolk, and her efforts to have her husband named Lord Willoughby de Eresby were unsuccessful. In 1555, during the reign of Queen Mary I, the Berties were among the Marian exiles who left for the Continent. Their persecution by Stephen Gardiner, the Bishop of Winchester and Lord Chancellor, and subsequent wanderings were recounted in Foxe's Book of Martyrs, in an account probably written by Richard Bertie himself for the 1570 edition. During this period Sigismund II Augustus, the King of Poland and Duke of Lithuania appointed them as administrators of Lithuania, based at Kražiai.

By Richard Bertie, Katherine was the mother of:

- Susan Bertie, Countess of Kent, (b. 1554) who married, firstly, Reginald Grey, 5th Earl of Kent, (before 1541 – 1573) and, secondly, Sir John Wingfield, a nephew of Katherine's friend, Bess of Hardwick. Katherine was successful in persuading Elizabeth I to restore the Kent earldom to Reginald (sometimes known as Reynold), her son-in-law, after it had been in abeyance for 47 years following the death of Richard Grey, 3rd earl of Kent, whose half brother Sir Henry Grey was Reynold’s grandfather.
- Peregrine Bertie (1555 – 1601) (named for their peregrinations in exile), who married Mary de Vere, only sister of the whole blood of Edward de Vere, 17th Earl of Oxford.

After their return to England, they lived at Katherine's estate, Grimsthorpe in Lincolnshire, and at court.

In 1560 Katherine won an important case in legal history, Bertie v. Herenden, more commonly known as the Duchess of Suffolk's case. She had conveyed her lands to her lawyer before her exile, passing not only legal ownership but also the use (i.e. beneficial ownership). This case established that a secret "use on a use" was enforceable, here that her lawyer's use of the lands would be for her benefit. Such a "use on a use" had been rejected in Tyrrel's case (1557) but was supported here.

== Jewels ==
In 1551, some of her jewels were in the keeping of William Sharington of Lacock Abbey. She had pledged them for a loan of £1,100. These included brooches, tablets or lockets, one depicting Jacob's Ladder, another a town with a castle, another, the story of the Samaritan woman, with a number of jewelled gold "billaments" for wearing on a French hood. A jewel or cross "set with letters of Jhesus of diamonds" in diamonds (the letters "IHS") had a square diamond and a long ruby on the reverse, and three pendant pearls. This piece may have resembled the cross and "IHS" jewels depicted in portraits of Jane Seymour and Catherine of Aragon. Such jewels also appear in other royal inventories.

== Literary tributes ==
Katherine and Richard Bertie's exile became the basis of a ballad by Thomas Deloney (1543–1600), The most Rare and Excellent History, Of the Duchess of Suffolks Calamity, and of Thomas Drue's play, The Life of the Duchess of Suffolk, published in 1624. It may also have been the subject of an unpublished play from 1600 by William Haughton, The English Fugitives. Katherine's second marriage to one of her servants and subsequent persecution also present parallels to the plot of John Webster's The Duchess of Malfi.

== Issue ==
By her first marriage, she had two sons:

- Henry Brandon, 2nd Duke of Suffolk (18 September 1535 – 14 July 1551), died of the sweating sickness
- Charles Brandon, 3rd Duke of Suffolk (1537/38 – 14 July 1551), died of the sweating sickness an hour after his older brother.

By her second marriage, she had a daughter and a son:

- Susan Bertie, Countess of Kent (1554 – unknown), married, firstly, in 1570, Reginald Grey of Wrest, 5th Earl of Kent and, secondly, on 30 September 1581, John Wingfield by whom she had two sons Peregrine Wingfield and Robert Wingfield.
- Peregrine Bertie, 13th Baron Willoughby de Eresby (12 October 1555 – 1601), married 1577 Mary de Vere, daughter of John de Vere, 16th Earl of Oxford and Margery Golding. They had seven children.

== In fiction ==
- Katherine's story is very fictionalised in The Sixth Wife: A Novel by Suzannah Dunn
- Her character is played by Rebekah Wainwright in the historical fiction series The Tudors, where she is called Catherine Brooke, and much of her story has been changed.
- Katherine and her second husband Bertie appear in Stanley J. Weyman's 1891 novel The Story of Francis Cludde. It covers the period 1555–58, when the eponymous hero helps them escape Mary's agents and reach safety in Germany; he also is made godfather to their son Peregrine. As with most of Weyman's novels, the historical detail is accurate and well researched.

== Notes ==
Peerage of England
Preceded by William Willoughby	Baroness Willoughby de Eresby; 1526–1580	Succeeded by Peregrine Bertie
