= Mary Willoughby =

Mary Willoughby may refer to:

- Mary Willoughby, Baroness Willoughby, or Mary, married name Willoughby (c. 1490–1539)
- English ship Mary Willoughby, named after the above
