= Susan Bertie, Countess of Kent =

English noblewoman

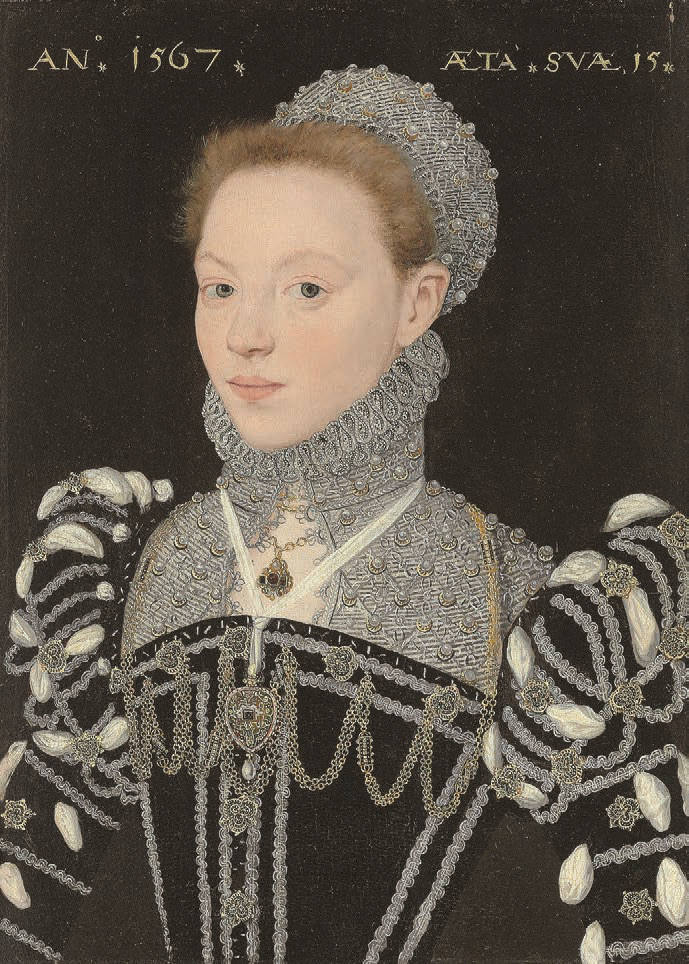
Portrait of Susan Bertie by the Master of the Countess of Warwick, 1567

Susan Bertie (born 1554) was the daughter of Catherine, Duchess of Suffolk, née Willoughby, by her second husband, Richard Bertie. Susan was the noblewoman memorialized by poet Emilia Lanier (née Aemilia Bassano) at the beginning of the Salve Deus Rex Judaeorum (1611) as the "daughter of the Duchess of Suffolk." At sixteen years of age, Susan Bertie married Reginald Grey of Wrest, who was later restored as the fifth Earl of Kent following her mother's intervention. At age 19 her husband died. In 1578, she acted as chief mourner for her lifetime friend Lady Mary Grey at her funeral. In 1581 aged 27, she remarried to John Wingfield.

== Early life ==
Susan was the first child of her mother's second marriage. Born one year after Susan was a brother, Peregrine Bertie, who later succeeded his mother as the 13th Baron Willoughby de Eresby.

The dowager duchess and her second husband, devout Protestants, went into exile on the Continent with Susan and her brother for the remainder of the Catholic Queen Mary's reign, only returning in 1559 to the duchess’s elaborate manor house of Grimsthorpe in Lincolnshire after the accession of Queen Elizabeth, Susan being five years of age.

A record of clothes bought for Susan, her siblings, and the Bertie household in 1561 mentions Susan's farthingale, her Dutch gown of crimson satin, a gold cawl or hairnet, the finding of a brooch she lost, and a lute bought for her and her brother Peregrine. A portrait of Peregrine and Susan was painted in 1562.

In 1570, at the age of sixteen, Susan married Reginald Grey of Wrest, and left Grimsthorpe. Known at the time of his marriage as "Master Grey", Susan's husband was acknowledged by Elizabeth I as Earl of Kent by 30 December 1571, as the result of a campaign by his mother-in-law Katherine, Duchess of Suffolk. Susan became known as Countess of Kent as a result. A year later, on 15 March 1573, the earl died.

Because the Earl and Countess of Kent had been childless, the heir to the earldom was the earl's thirty-three-year-old younger brother, styled until then Henry Lord Grey of Ruthin. Susan Bertie Grey, now nineteen and Dowager Countess of Kent, and presumably unable to continue living in the new Earl of Kent's inherited residence, may at this time have been invited to live at Court. If so, the invitation was presumably issued at the behest of Queen Elizabeth I, who often kept a benevolent watch over younger ladies of the peerage in Susan's situation – certainly the queen would take an angry interest in Susan's remarriage in 1581.

== Second marriage ==
Her second husband, Sir John Wingfield, was a nephew of Bess of Hardwick. They had two sons, Peregrine Wingfield, born in Holland, presumably named after her brother, and Robert Wingfield. Wingfield died in 1596 during the capture of Cadiz, widowing Susan and leaving her without means of support. Elizabeth I granted her a £100 pension for life the next year.

Aemilia Lanyer called Susan Bertie "the Mistris of my youth, / The noble guide of my ungovern'd dayes." The poet was educated under the direction of the dowager Countess of Kent, whose Protestant humanist circle had a profound influence on the young Lanyer. The practice of being sent from one's family to be trained up in service in an aristocratic household, like that of Susan's, was then widespread.
