= Henry Grey, 8th Earl of Kent =

English peer

Member of Parliament for Tavistock
- In office 1601

Personal details
- Born: c. 1583
- Died: 21 November 1639 (aged 55–56)
- Spouse: Elizabeth Talbot (m. 1601)
- Parent: Charles Grey (father)
- Relatives: Reginald Grey (uncle); Henry Grey (uncle)
- Education: Trinity College, Cambridge

Henry Grey, 8th Earl of Kent (c. 1583 – 21 November 1639) of Wrest Park, Bedfordshire was Earl of Kent from 1623 to his death.

== Biography ==
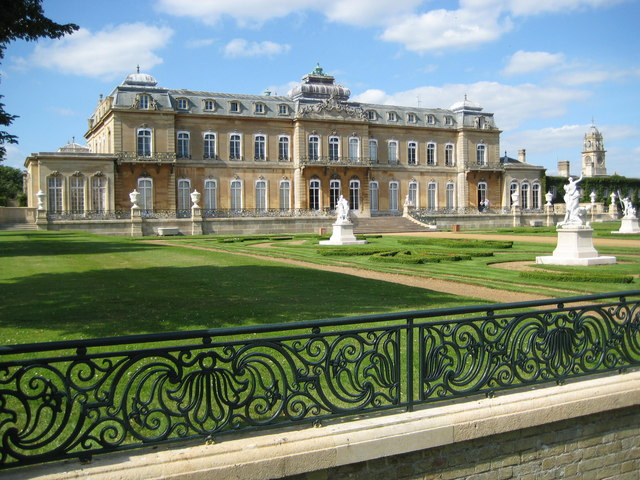
Wrest House, Bedfordshire

He was born the only son of Charles Grey, 7th Earl of Kent and his wife Susan Cotton and educated at Trinity College, Cambridge. His legal agents include John Selden, a prominent jurist.

On 16 November 1601, at St Martin-in-the-Fields, Henry married Elizabeth Talbot (1582 – 7 December 1651), a daughter of Gilbert Talbot, 7th Earl of Shrewsbury and Mary Cavendish. There were no known children from this marriage. He was knighted in 1603.

He was elected member of parliament for Tavistock in 1601 and knight of the shire for Bedfordshire in 1614.

He served as Lord Lieutenant of Bedfordshire from 1621 to 1627 and again from 1629 to his death. From 1621 to 1623, Henry held the title jointly with his father Charles Grey, 7th Earl of Kent. From 1625 to 1627 and again from 1629 to his death, he held the title jointly with Thomas Wentworth, 1st Earl of Cleveland.

He died childless and his primary title as Earl of Kent was inherited by his closest male-line relative, Anthony Grey, 9th Earl of Kent, the Rector of Burbage, Leicestershire. Anthony was a second cousin of his father as they were both great-grandsons of George Grey, 2nd Earl of Kent. His title of Baron Grey de Ruthyn was awarded by the House of Lords to his nephew Charles Longueville, 12th Baron Grey de Ruthyn, son of his sister Susan.

== Sources ==
- The Complete Peerage
- History of Parliament GREY, Henry (c.1583-1639) of Flitton, Beds

Political offices
Preceded by The Earl of Kent	Lord Lieutenant of Bedfordshire jointly with The Earl of Kent 1621–1623 and The Earl of Cleveland 1625–1627; 1621–1627	Succeeded by The Earl of Cleveland
Preceded by The Earl of Cleveland	Lord Lieutenant of Bedfordshire jointly with The Earl of Cleveland 1629–1639; 1629–1639	Succeeded by The Earl of Cleveland (Royalist) and The Earl of Bolingbroke (Parliamentarian)
Peerage of England
Preceded by Charles Grey	Earl of Kent; 1623–1639	Succeeded by Anthony Grey
Preceded by Charles Grey	Baron Grey de Ruthyn; 1623–1639	Succeeded by Charles Longueville
