= Lord Lieutenant of Bedfordshire =

Civil post in Bedfordshire, England

- Incumbent; Susan Lousada since 7 September 2022
- County of Bedfordshire
- Reports to: The Crown
- Nominator: Prime Minister of the UK
- Appointer: The Crown
- Term length: Until retirement or age 75
- Formation: 1549
- First holder: William Parr
- Salary: Unpaid
- Website: bedfordshirell.org.uk

This is a list of people who have served as Lord Lieutenant of Bedfordshire. Since 1711, all Lords Lieutenant have also been Custos Rotulorum of Bedfordshire.

- William Parr, 1st Marquess of Northampton 1549–1551
- Oliver St John, 1st Baron St John of Bletso 1560–1569
- Henry Grey, 6th Earl of Kent 12 September 1586– 31 January 1615
- Charles Grey, 7th Earl of Kent 25 February 1615– 28 September 1623 jointly with
- Henry Grey, 8th Earl of Kent 27 July 1621 – 31 October 1627 jointly with
- Thomas Wentworth, 1st Earl of Cleveland 9 May 1625 – 25 March 1667 jointly with
- Henry Grey, 8th Earl of Kent 29 January 1629 – 21 November 1639
- Oliver St John, 1st Earl of Bolingbroke 1639–1646 (Parliamentary)
- Robert Bruce, Lord Bruce of Whorlton 1646 (Parliamentary; nominated by House of Lords)
- Henry Grey, 10th Earl of Kent 1646 (Parliamentary; nominated by House of Commons)
- Interregnum
- Robert Bruce, 1st Earl of Ailesbury 26 July 1660 – 20 October 1685
- Thomas Bruce, 2nd Earl of Ailesbury 26 November 1685 – 10 May 1689
- William Russell, 1st Duke of Bedford 10 May 1689 – 7 September 1700
- Lord Edward Russell 22 November 1700 – 27 November 1701
- Wriothesley Russell, 2nd Duke of Bedford 27 November 1701 – 26 May 1711
- Henry Grey, 1st Duke of Kent 14 September 1711 – 5 June 1740
- vacant
- John Russell, 4th Duke of Bedford 21 May 1745 – 5 January 1771
- John FitzPatrick, 2nd Earl of Upper Ossory 6 February 1771 – 13 February 1818
- Thomas de Grey, 2nd Earl de Grey 17 March 1818 – 14 November 1859
- Francis Russell, 7th Duke of Bedford 7 December 1859 – 14 May 1861
- Francis Cowper, 7th Earl Cowper 7 June 1861 – 18 July 1905
- Beauchamp Mowbray St John, 17th Baron St John of Bletso 30 October 1905 – 10 May 1912
- Samuel Howard Whitbread 16 July 1912 – 8 January 1936
- George Lawson Johnston, 1st Baron Luke 8 January 1936 – 23 February 1943
- Sir Dealtry Charles Part 15 May 1943 – 7 June 1957
- Simon Whitbread 7 June 1957 – 26 April 1978
- Hanmer Cecil Hanbury 26 April 1978 – 5 January 1991
- Sir Samuel Whitbread 28 February 1991 – 22 February 2012
- Helen Nellis 22 February 2012 – 2022
- Susan Lousada 7 September 2022 - present
