= Mary Grey, Countess of Kent =

English peeress

The Right Honourable The Countess of Kent The Baroness Lucas

Baroness Lucas of Crudwell
- Reign: 7 May 1663 – 1 November 1702 (39 years, 178 days)
- Predecessor: First baroness
- Successor: Henry Grey
- Born: Mary Lucas; In 17th century
- Died: 1 November 1702
- Buried: Flitton
- Noble family: Lucas; Grey (by marriage)
- Spouse: Anthony Grey, 11th Earl of Kent
- Issue: Henry Grey, 1st Duke of Kent; Amabella Grey
- Father: John Lucas, 1st Baron Lucas of Shenfield
- Mother: Anne Nevill

Mary Lucas, suo jure 1st Baroness Lucas of Crudwell (died 1 November 1702), also called Mary Grey, Countess of Kent, was an English peeress in her own right.

== Origins ==
Mary Lucas was the only daughter of John Lucas, 1st Baron Lucas of Shenfield, Essex (1606–1671) and Anne Nevill. She had a brother named John, who was born in 1633, but he died young. As a result, she was the sole heiress of her father.

== Marriage and children ==
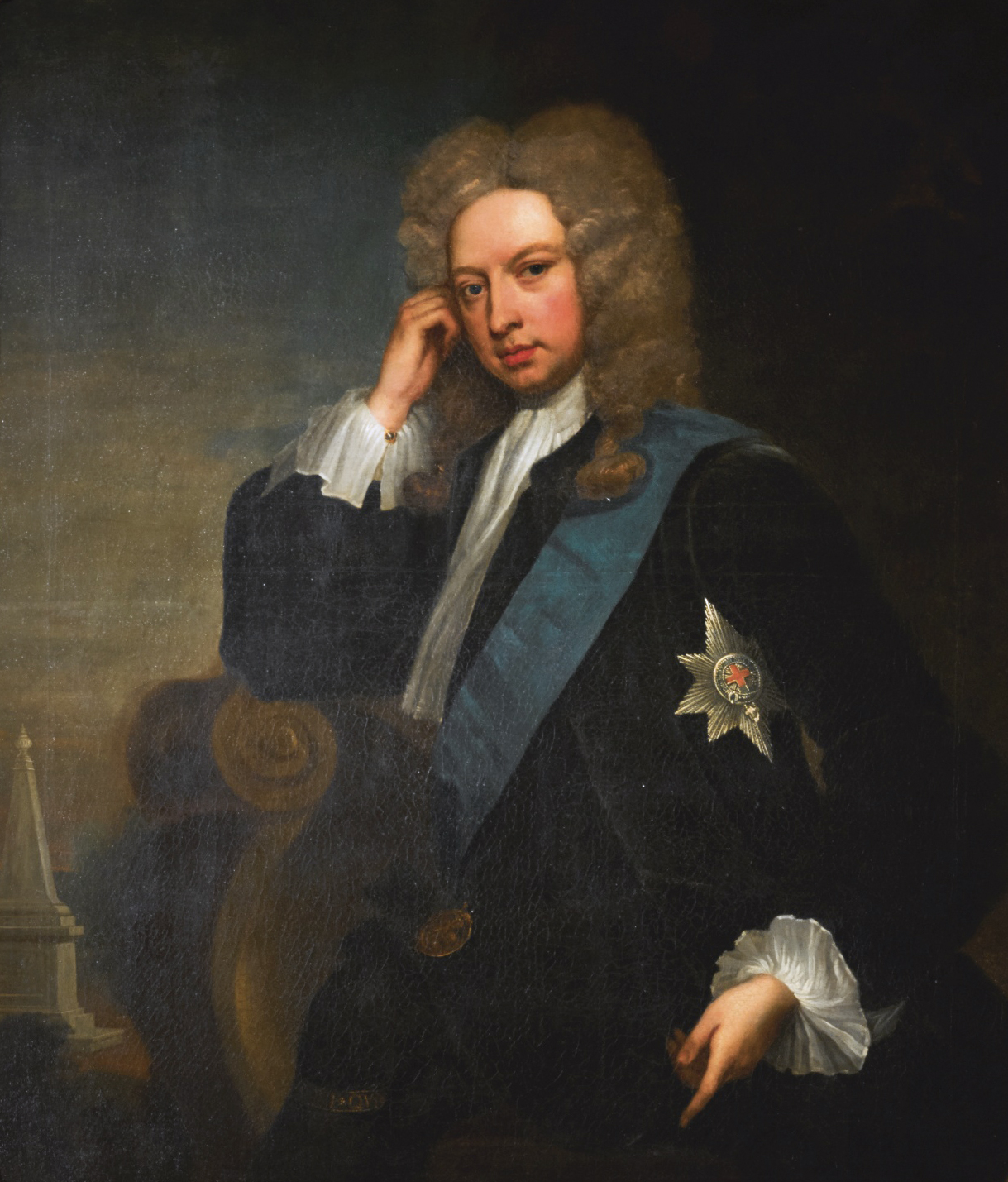
Henry Grey, 1st Duke of Kent, son of Mary Lucas, 1st Baroness Lucas of Crudwell and Anthony Grey, 11th Earl of Kent.

On 2 March 1662/1663, Mary Lucas married Anthony Grey, 11th Earl of Kent. By marriage, she became Countess of Kent. Mary and Anthony had two children:

- Henry Grey, 1st Duke of Kent (1671 – 5 June 1740), married firstly to Jemima Crew, daughter of Thomas Crew, 2nd Baron Crew and Anne Airmyn, on 26 March 1695 and had eleven children; remarried to Sophia Bentinck, daughter of William Bentinck, 1st Earl of Portland and Jane Temple, on 24 March 1728/1729 and had two children.
- Amabella Grey, did not get married.

== Suo jure peerage ==
On 5 June 1663, according to the request of John Lucas, 1st Baron Lucas of Shenfield, father of the Countess of Kent, Mary was created suo jure Baroness Lucas of Crudwell by Charles II of England in the Peerage of England. This new creation was granted a special remainder to Mary's heirs male by her husband Anthony Grey, 11th Earl of Kent, and failing which, to her heirs female without division. This was a unique remainder for the English peerage as it can not fall into abeyance between female co-heiresses but is inherited by the senior co-heiress alone.

== Death and succession ==
Mary Lucas, Countess of Kent and Baroness Lucas, died on 1 November 1702 and was succeeded in the barony by her eldest son Henry Grey, who in 19 August 1702 also succeeded his father as 12th Earl of Kent and was created Duke of Kent on 28 April 1710. Mary and her husband was buried at Flitton.

== Ancestry ==
Ancestry of Mary Lucas, 1st Baroness Lucas

16. John Lucas
8. Thomas Lucas
17. Mary
4. Thomas Lucas
18. John Fermor of Easton Neston
9. Mary Fermor
19. Maud Vaux
2. John Lucas, 1st Baron Lucas of Shenfield
10. John Leighton
5. Elizabeth Leighton
11.
1. Mary Lucas, 1st Baroness Lucas of Crudwell
12. Edward Nevill, Lord Abergavenny
6. Christopher Nevill
13.
3. Anne Nevill
14. Thomas Darcy of Tolleshunt
7. Mary Darcy
15.

== See also ==
- Wrest Park

Peerage of England
New creation	Baroness Lucas; 1663–1702	Succeeded by Henry Grey
Preceded by Amabel Benn	Countess of Kent (by marriage); 1662/1663–1702	Succeeded by Jemima Crew
