= John Wingfield =

Sir John Wingfield (before 1582–1596) was an English soldier.

== Life ==
He was the third son of Richard Wingfield of Wantisden in Suffolk, and Mary, daughter and coheiress of John Hardwick of Derby, and the sister of Bess of Hardwick. His brother Anthony Wingfield was reader in Greek to Elizabeth I of England.

He was a Member of the Parliament of England for Lichfield in 1593.

A volunteer against the Spanish in Holland, he was appointed captain of foot in the expedition there of Robert Dudley, 1st Earl of Leicester in December 1585. Wounded action before Zutphen on 22 September 1586, he was knighted by Leicester. He was one of the twelve knights, friends and relations, who walked at the funeral of Sir Philip Sidney on 16 February 1587.

Returning to the Netherlands, he was appointed governor of Geertruidenberg. With the assistance furnished him by his brother-in-law, Peregrine Bertie, 13th Baron Willoughby de Eresby, he managed to hold out successfully during 1588, and to assist materially in forcing Alexander Farnese, Duke of Parma to raise the siege of Bergen in November. His position, though, suffered from tension between the English auxiliaries and the States-General. The garrison lacked pay, and was mutinous. A rumour arose that he intended to hand over the place to the Spanish, and Maurice of Nassau came with a demand for its surrender. Wingfield denied the imputed treason; but Geertruidenberg was on 10 April 1589, delivered to the Spanish.

Returning to England with his wife and newly born child, Wingfield served as master of the ordnance under Sir John Norris in Brittany against the forces of the Catholic League in 1591, and the following year he is mentioned as being in charge of the storehouse at Dieppe.

In June 1596 he sailed on board the Vanguard, as camp-master with the rank of colonel, in the expedition under Robert Devereux, 2nd Earl of Essex against Cádiz. After an attack on the Spanish fleet led by Walter Ralegh, in which he took part, he was one of the first to enter the town. Ordered on 21 June to bait an ambush, Wingfield led 200 men along the isthmus leading to the city gates which were defended by 500 Spanish cavalry. He then feigned a panic-stricken retreat and drew the Spanish back into the arms of a larger hidden English force. In the rout that followed the English broke through the city gates and Wingfield was wounded in the thigh, while Essex and a small band fought through to the plaza. Unable to walk, Wingfield captured a horse to follow Essex, and—now an obvious target—was killed instantly by a bullet to the head just as the city surrendered. He was buried five days later with all the funerall solemnities of warre in the Cádiz Cathedral, while the generals threw their handkerchiefs wet from their eyes into the grave (Stow). John Donne, a member of the expedition, composed the well-known epigram (Farther then Wingefield, no man dares to go) in tribute. In the following year the queen granted his widow an annuity of £100 a year.

== Family ==
Wingfield married, about 1582, Susan Bertie, countess of Kent, sister of Peregrine Bertie, Lord Willoughby de Eresby, and widow of Reginald Grey, 5th Earl of Kent, by whom he had two sons, Peregrine, born in Holland, presumably named after her brother, and Robert Wingfield.
