= William Willoughby, 11th Baron Willoughby de Eresby =

English nobleman

William Willoughby, 11th Baron Willoughby de Eresby (1482–1526), was an English baron and the largest landowner in Lincolnshire.

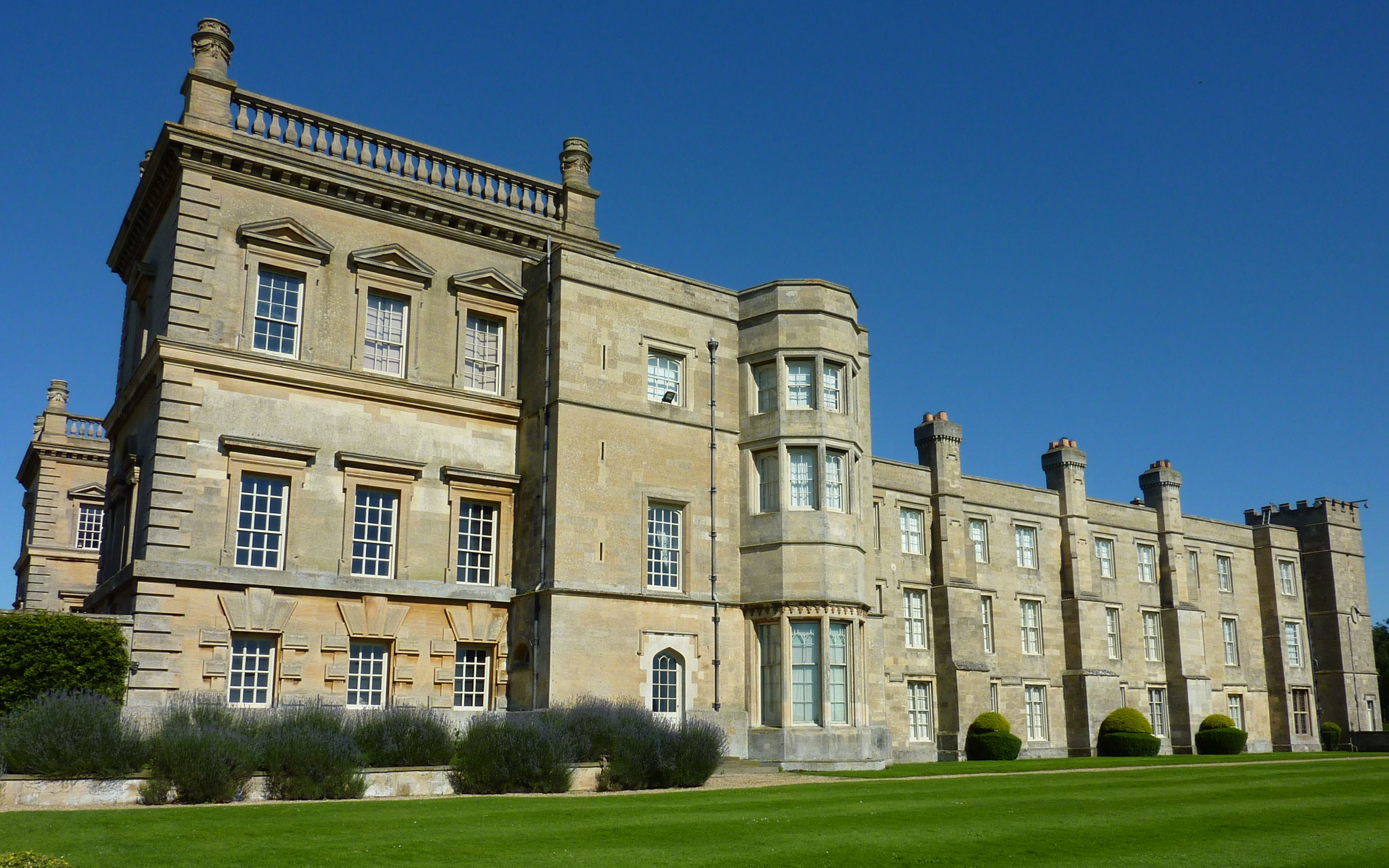
West Front, Grimsthorpe Castle, Lincolnshire

He was the son of Sir Christopher Willoughby (died c. 1498) and Margaret or Marjery Jenney (daughter of Sir William Jenney of Knodishall, Suffolk, Justice of the King's Bench). In 1499, he succeeded as Baron Willoughby de Eresby.

He married first Mary Hussey (born 1484), youngest child of Sir William Hussey, Chief Justice of the King's Bench. Secondly, on 5 June 1516, he married María de Salinas, the Spanish-born lady-in-waiting to Catherine of Aragon. Grimsthorpe Castle was granted by Henry VIII to the de Eresby family on the occasion of Maria's marriage. By his second wife, Willoughby had a daughter, Catherine, who succeeded him in the barony on his death in 1526. She was betrothed to Henry Brandon, 1st Earl of Lincoln, the son of Charles Brandon, 1st Duke of Suffolk, and Princess Mary, the sister of Henry VIII. When Princess Mary died in 1533, fourteen-year-old Catherine was hastily married to the Duke of Suffolk, her fiancé's father, who was thirty-five years her senior. In 1546, there were rumours that Henry VIII wished to marry the widowed Catherine.

== Death ==
William Willoughby, 11th Baron Willoughby de Eresby, died on 14 October 1526 at Parham, Suffolk and was buried on 19 October at All Saints Church, Mettingham, Suffolk.

== Notes ==
Peerage of England
Preceded by Christopher Willoughby	Baron Willoughby de Eresby; 1499–1526	Succeeded by Catherine Willoughby
