= Capture of Geertruidenberg (1589) =

1589 battle

- Part of the Eighty Years' War and the Anglo-Spanish War (1585–1604)
Date	April 10, 1589
Location	Geertruidenberg, Duchy of Brabant (present-day the Netherlands)
Result	Spanish victory

Belligerents
England; Dutch Republic	(Spain) Spanish Empire

Commanders and leaders
(Kingdom of England) John Wingfield	(Spain) Alexander Farnese

The Capture of Geertruidenberg of 1589, also known as the English betrayal of Geertruidenberg, took place on April 10, 1589, at Geertruidenberg, Duchy of Brabant, Flanders (present-day the Netherlands), during the Eighty Years' War and the Anglo-Spanish War (1585–1604).

== Events ==
On April 10, 1589, the garrison of Geertruidenberg, composed of numerous English and some Dutch troops commanded by Governor Sir John Wingfield, surrendered the city to the Army of Flanders led by Don Alexander Farnese, Governor-General of the Spanish Netherlands (Spanish: Alejandro Farnesio). A few days before, when pay did not arrive in time, the English soldiers mutinied, and was rumored that Wingfield had intended to surrender (or "sold") the city to the Spaniards. The States-General and Prince Maurice of Nassau (Dutch: Maurits van Oranje) accused him of treason for its surrender, but Wingfield denied the charges against him. The fact was that Geertruidenberg was in Spanish hands.

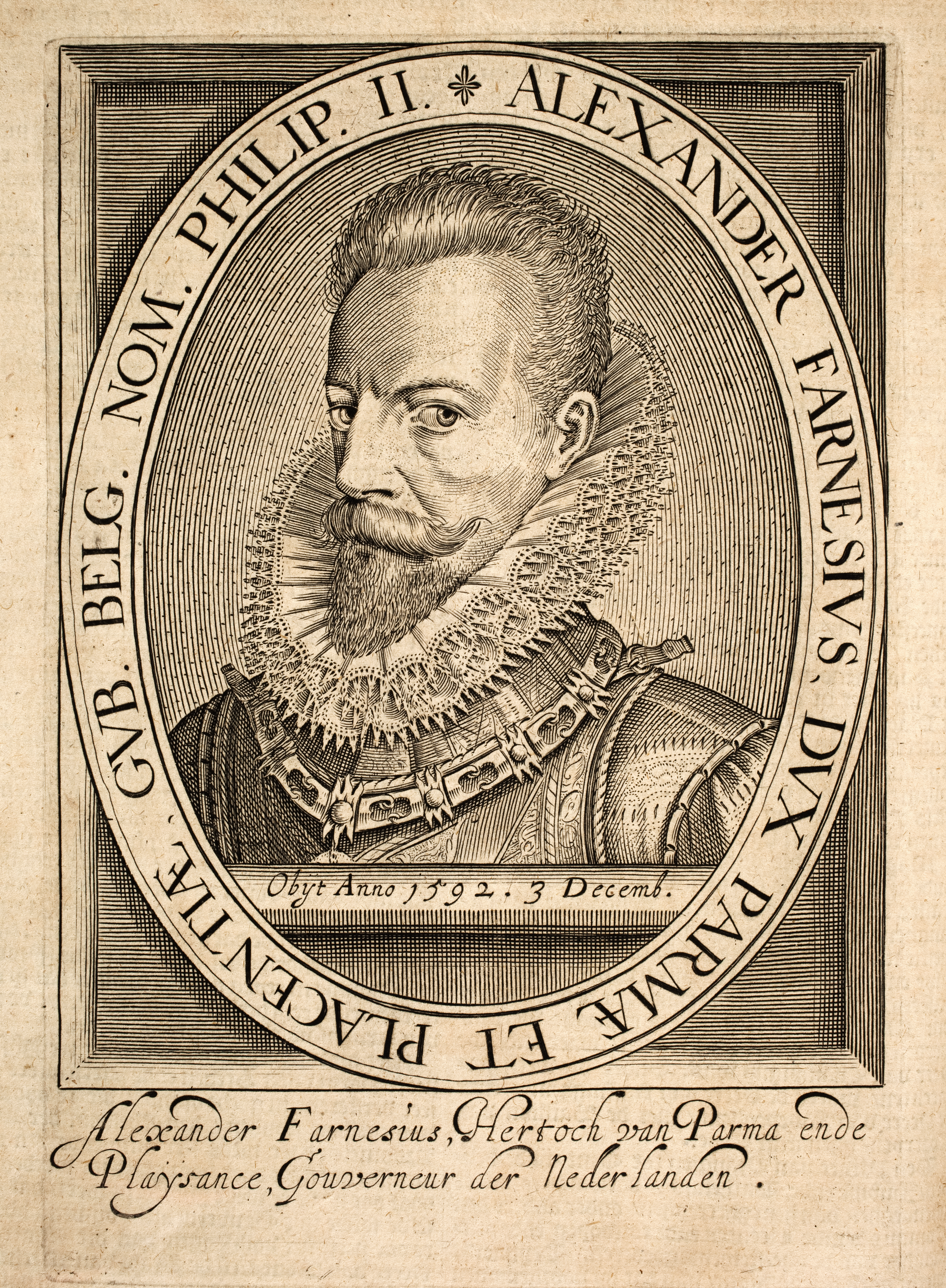
Engraving of Don Alexander Farnese by Emanuel van Meteren.

The same year, in September, Parma sent a force under Count Peter Ernst of Mansfeld to besiege Rheinberg. The garrison capitulated to the Spaniards in February 1590.

Geertruidenberg was recaptured in June 1593 by an Anglo-Dutch force under the command of Maurice of Nassau and Francis Vere respectively.

== See also ==
- Siege of Bergen op Zoom (1588)
- Siege of Rheinberg (1586–1590)
- Sir William Stanley
- Rowland York
- Spanish Army of Flanders
- List of governors of the Spanish Netherlands
