= Charles Grey, 7th Earl of Kent =

English noble

- Born: c. 1545
- Died: 26 September 1623
- Spouse: Susan Cotton
- Children: 2, including Henry Grey
- Relatives: Reginald Grey (brother); Henry Grey (brother); Henry Grey (grandfather)

Charles Grey (c. 1545 – 26 September 1623) was the 7th Earl of Kent from 1615 to his death.

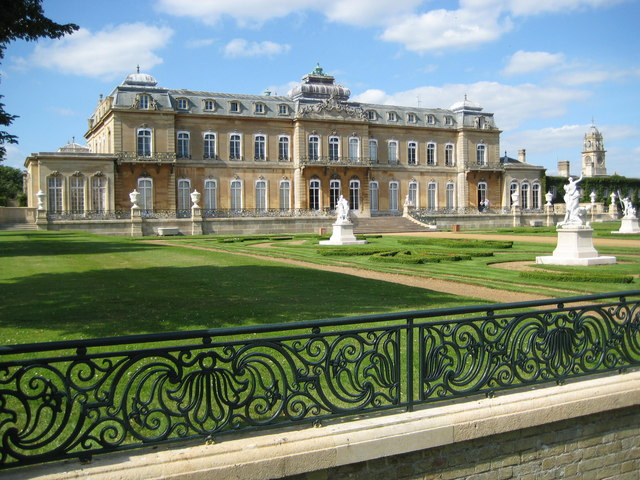
Wrest House, Bedfordshire – seat of the Earls of Kent

== Personal life ==
Grey was the third son of Henry Grey, 4th Earl of Kent. He was a younger brother of Reginald Grey, 5th Earl of Kent and Henry Grey, 6th Earl of Kent.

He married Susan Cotton, daughter of Sir Richard Cotton. They had two children:

- Henry Grey, 8th Earl of Kent (c. 1583–1639).
- Susan Grey (bur. 13 December 1620). Married Sir Michael Longueville. They were parents to Charles Longueville, 12th Baron Grey de Ruthyn.

== Career ==
He served from 1615 to his death as Lord Lieutenant of Bedfordshire. At first alone in his position, from 1621 jointly with his son Lord Grey de Ruthyn.

== Bibliography ==
- The Complete Peerage

Political offices
| Preceded by The Earl of Kent | Lord Lieutenant of Bedfordshire jointly with Lord Grey de Ruthyn 1621–1623; 1615–1623 | Succeeded by The Earl of Kent |
Peerage of England
| Preceded by Henry Grey | Earl of Kent; 1615–1623 | Succeeded by Henry Grey |
