= Anthony Grey, 11th Earl of Kent =

English peer

- Born: 1645
- Died: 19 August 1702 (aged 56–57)
- Spouse: Mary Lucas
- Children: 2, including Henry
- Father: Henry Grey
- Relatives: Anthony Grey (grandfather)

Anthony Grey (1645 – 19 August 1702) was Earl of Kent from 1651 to his death.

== Biography ==
He was the only son of Henry Grey, 10th Earl of Kent, and his second wife Amabel Benn daughter of Anthony Benn, Recorder of London. His sister Elizabeth Grey married Banastre Maynard, 3rd Baron Maynard. They were parents of Henry Maynard, 4th Baron Maynard, Grey Maynard, 5th Baron Maynard, and Charles Maynard, 1st Viscount Maynard.

Anthony married Mary Lucas, Baroness Lucas of Crudwell, only surviving child of John Lucas, 1st Baron Lucas of Shenfield, and Anne Nevill. Anne was a daughter of Sir Christopher Nevill and Mary Darcy. Christopher was a son of Edward Nevill, 8th Baron Bergavenny, and Rachel Lennard.

They had two children:

- Henry Grey, 1st Duke of Kent (1671–1740)
- Amabel Grey.

== See also ==
- Wrest Park

== Sources ==
- The Complete Peerage

Peerage of England
Preceded by Henry Grey	Earl of Kent; 1651–1702	Succeeded by Henry Grey
