= Henry Grey, 10th Earl of Kent =

English politician

Member of Parliament for Leicestershire
- In office 1640

Personal details
- Born: 24 November 1594
- Died: 28 May 1651 (aged 56)
- Spouse(s): Mary Courteen (d. 1644) Amabel Benn (m. 1644)
- Children: 3, including Anthony
- Parent: Anthony Grey (father)

Henry Grey, 10th Earl of Kent (24 November 1594 – 28 May 1651), known as Lord Ruthin from 1639 to 1643, was an English politician who sat in the House of Commons in 1640 and succeeded to the title Earl of Kent in 1643.

== Biography ==
Grey was the eldest son of Rev. Anthony Grey, 9th Earl of Kent, and his wife Magdalene Purefoy, daughter of William Purefoy of Caldecote, Warwickshire. His father was rector of Aston Flamville, Leicestershire. Grey became Lord Ruthin on 21 November 1639. In April 1640 he was elected Member of Parliament for Leicestershire for the Short Parliament but did not sit in the Long Parliament.

On 4 June 1642 Grey was chosen by the parliament as first commissioner of the militia in Leicestershire. He inherited the title as Earl of Kent on the death of his father in 1643. On 16 August 1644 he became a commissioner of martial law and on 24 August he became Lord Lieutenant of Rutland. He became speaker of the House of Lords on 13 February 1645. He was resworn first commissioner of the great seal on 20 March 1645, and continued in office until 30 October 1646, when the seal was given to the speakers of the two houses. He was Custos Rotulorum of Bedfordshire and was appointed Lord Lieutenant of Bedfordshire by parliament on the Long Parliament on 2 July 1646 and held the position until his death.

Grey became speaker of the House of Lords on 6 September 1647 and became a member of the committee of the navy and customs on 17 December 1647. He was one of the lords commissioners who took the four bills to the king at the Isle of Wight, and had to bring them back unsigned. In January 1648, he was selected to replace Earl of Essex as one of the seven peers on the Derby House Committee soon after it replaced the Committee of Both Kingdoms as Parliament's principal proto-executive body. On 17 March 1648, he was renominated chief commissioner of the great seal together with another lord and two commoners, but took no part in the trial or death of the king. He remained in office until the commons voted the abolition of the House of Lords on 6 February 1649, and two days after placed the seal in other hands.

Grey married firstly Mary Courteen, daughter of Sir William Courteen and had a son Henry Grey who is believed to have died young. Mary died on 9 March 1644 and he married secondly on 1 August 1644 Annabel or Amabel Benn, daughter of Sir Anthony Benn and widow of Anthony Fane, the third surviving son of Francis Fane. They had two children: Anthony, who inherited the earldom, and Elizabeth, who married Banastre Maynard, 3rd Baron Maynard.

Grey died aged 56 and a monument to his memory was erected by his widow in Flitton Church, Bedfordshire.

== See also ==
- Wrest Park

Parliament of England
Vacant Parliament suspended since 1629	Member of Parliament for Leicestershire; 1640; With: Sir Arthur Hesilrige	Succeeded by Sir Arthur Hesilrige; Henry Smith
Peerage of England
Preceded by Anthony Grey	Earl of Kent; 1643–1651	Succeeded by Anthony Grey
Political offices
Preceded by The Earl of Bolingbroke	Lord Lieutenant of Bedfordshire (Parliamentary); 1646–1651	Vacant
