= Parham Hall =

House in Parham, Suffolk, England

Coordinates: 52.1889°N 1.3703°E

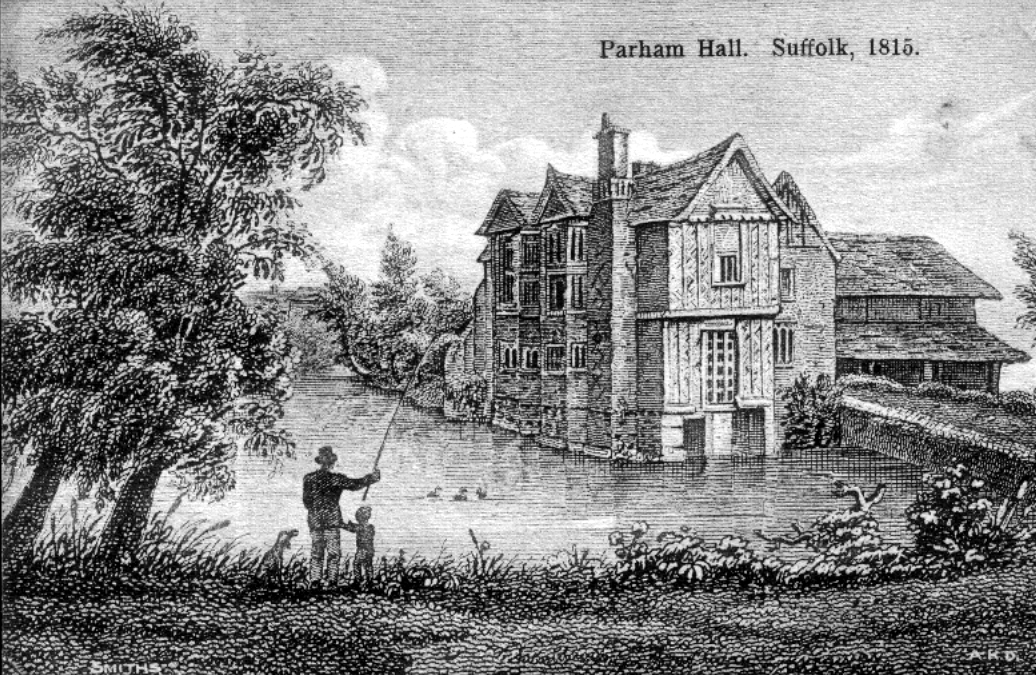
Parham Old Hall, 1815

Parham Old Hall is a historic medieval mansion close to the village of Parham, in Suffolk, England. Closely associated with the Barons Willoughby of Parham, it is a Grade II listed building on the National Heritage List for England and includes the remains of a formal garden. A gateway that featured heraldic shields of the Willoughbys was dismantled and shipped to America in 1926. There is in the locality another unconnected building known as Parham New Hall.

== Art ==
Parham Old Hall, Suffolk by Charles Hamilton Scott, being an Oil on canvas of 39 x 54 cm, is held in the public art collection of the Lanman Museum in Framlingham Castle, Suffolk.

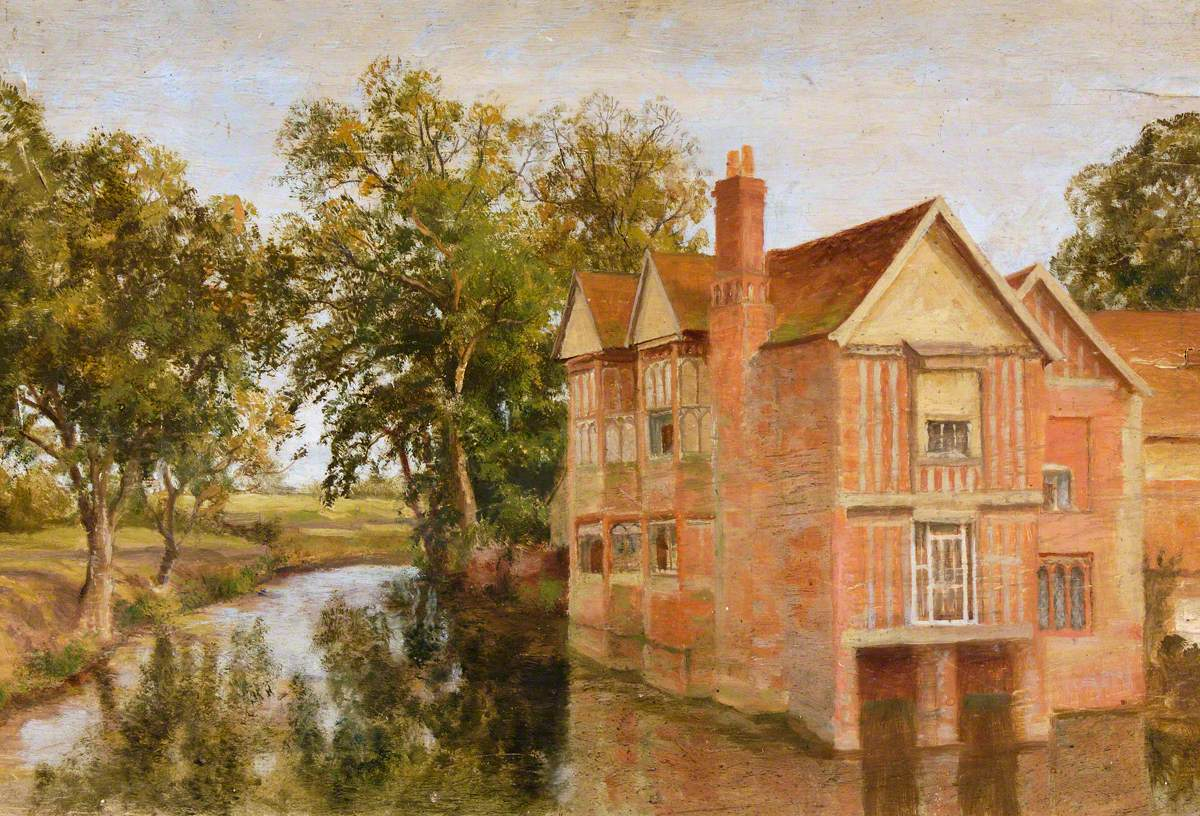
Parham Old Hall, by Charles Hamilton Scott (1877–1954), held in the Lanman Museum in Framlingham Castle, Suffolk
