= Anthony Grey, 9th Earl of Kent =

English peer

- Born: 1557
- Died: 9 November 1643 (aged 85–86)
- Spouse: Magdalene Purefoy
- Children: 12, including Henry
- Relatives: George Grey (grandfather)

Rev. Anthony Grey (1557 – 9 November 1643) was Earl of Kent from 1639 to his death.

== Biography ==
He was a son of George Grey by Margery, daughter of Gerard Salvaine of Croxdale. George was apparently the only son of Anthony Grey of Brancepeth, a son of George Grey, 2nd Earl of Kent, by his second wife Katherine (or Katharine or Catherine), daughter of William Herbert, 1st Earl of Pembroke.

In 1639, Grey succeeded his childless second cousin once removed Henry Grey, 8th Earl of Kent. Henry was a great-grandson of Henry Grey, 4th Earl of Kent, another son of the 2nd Earl.

A priest in the Church of England, Grey was rector at Aston Flamville and later Burbage.

== Family and issue ==
Grey married Magdalene, daughter of William Purefoy of Caldecote by Catherine (or Katherine) Wigston. Burke's Landed Gentry mentions his wife having a sister named Dorothy Purefoy who married Roger Dudley and was mother to Thomas Dudley, Governor of Massachusetts, however, other sources identify Susanna Thorne as the mother of Thomas, and Susanna's mother as Mary Purefoy.

Anthony and Magdalene had twelve children, all born in Burbage:

- Grace (29 April 1593 – ). Married James Ward of Hugglescote Grange Leicestershire
- Henry, 10th Earl of Kent (24 November 1594 – 28 May 1651).
- Magdalene (14 November 1596 – September 1668). Married John Browne of Stretton en le Field see Cave-Browne
- Christian (8 May 1598 – 5 June 1681). Married the Rev. Theophilus Burdett, rector of Burton Overy, in 1626.
- Faithmyjoye (1599–1602).
- Priscilla (1601–1665).
- Patience (b. 1603). Married a man of the Wood family.
- John (April 1605 – September 1605).
- Job (b. 1606), rector of Burbage and South Kilworth Leicestershire
- Theophilus (1608 – 30 March 1679)
- Nathaniel/Nathaniell (1613 – 9 May 1683).
- Presela (b. 1615).

== Ancestry ==
Ancestors of Anthony Grey, 9th Earl of Kent

Edmund Grey, 1st Earl of Kent
George Grey, 2nd Earl of Kent
Catherine/Katherine Percy
The Hon. Anthony Grey of Brancepeth
William Herbert, 1st Earl of Pembroke
Katherine/Katharine/Catherine Herbert
Anne Devereux
George Grey
_ Holland?
Rev. Anthony Grey
Gerard Salvaine of Croxdale
Gerard Salvaine of Croxdale
Eleanor Coigniers (Conyers?)
Gerard Salvaine of Croxdale
Johanna
Margery Salvaine
William Wrenne/Wrenn
Eleanor Wrenne/Wrenn

== Sources ==
- Database of FamilySearch.org – (The Church of Jesus Christ of Latter-day Saints)
- CP, "Kent"
- Grey on stirnet.com (subscription required)
- Salvin 2 on stirnet.com (subscription required)
- Salvin 1 on stirnet.com (subscription required)
- Purefoy on stirnet.com (subscription required)
- Ancestry.com. The American ancestors and descendants of Willard William and Cora Dunham Boyd : 1620-1928 [database on-line]. Provo, UT: Ancestry.com Operations Inc, 2005.

Peerage of England
Preceded by Henry Grey	Earl of Kent; 1639–1643	Succeeded by Henry Grey
