= Richard Bertie (courtier) =

16th-century English courtier

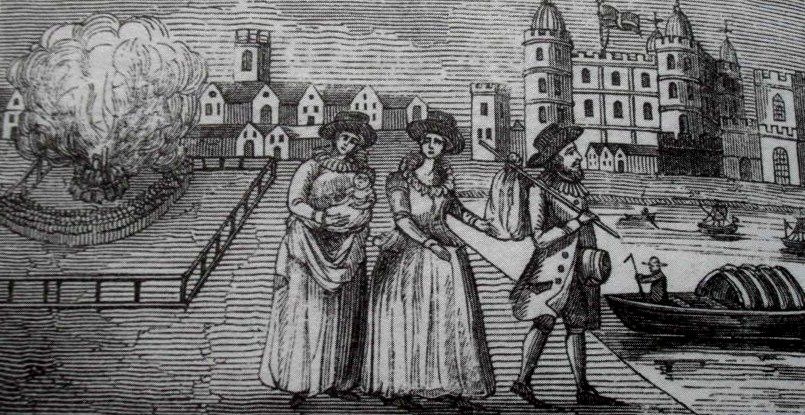
The couple, their daughter and wetnurse going into exile

Richard Bertie (25 December 1516 – 9 April 1582) was an English landowner and religious evangelical. He was the second husband of Katherine Willoughby, 12th Baroness Willoughby de Eresby, Duchess Dowager of Suffolk and a woman whom Henry VIII was considering as his seventh wife shortly before his death; she also received a proposal from the King of Poland.

== Life ==
Richard Bertie was from an unusually humble stock for the connections he made. He was the son of Thomas Bertie (ca. 1480-bef. 5 June 1555), Captain of Hurst Castle and a master mason, and Aline Say. His paternal grandfather Robert Bertie (died 1501/2) was also a stonemason at Bearsted, Kent, and was married to one Marion, by whom he had two more children, a daughter Joan Bertie and a son William Bertie, born after 1480. Richard matriculated at Corpus Christi College, Oxford, on 17 February 1533/1534 and succeeded his father in 1555.

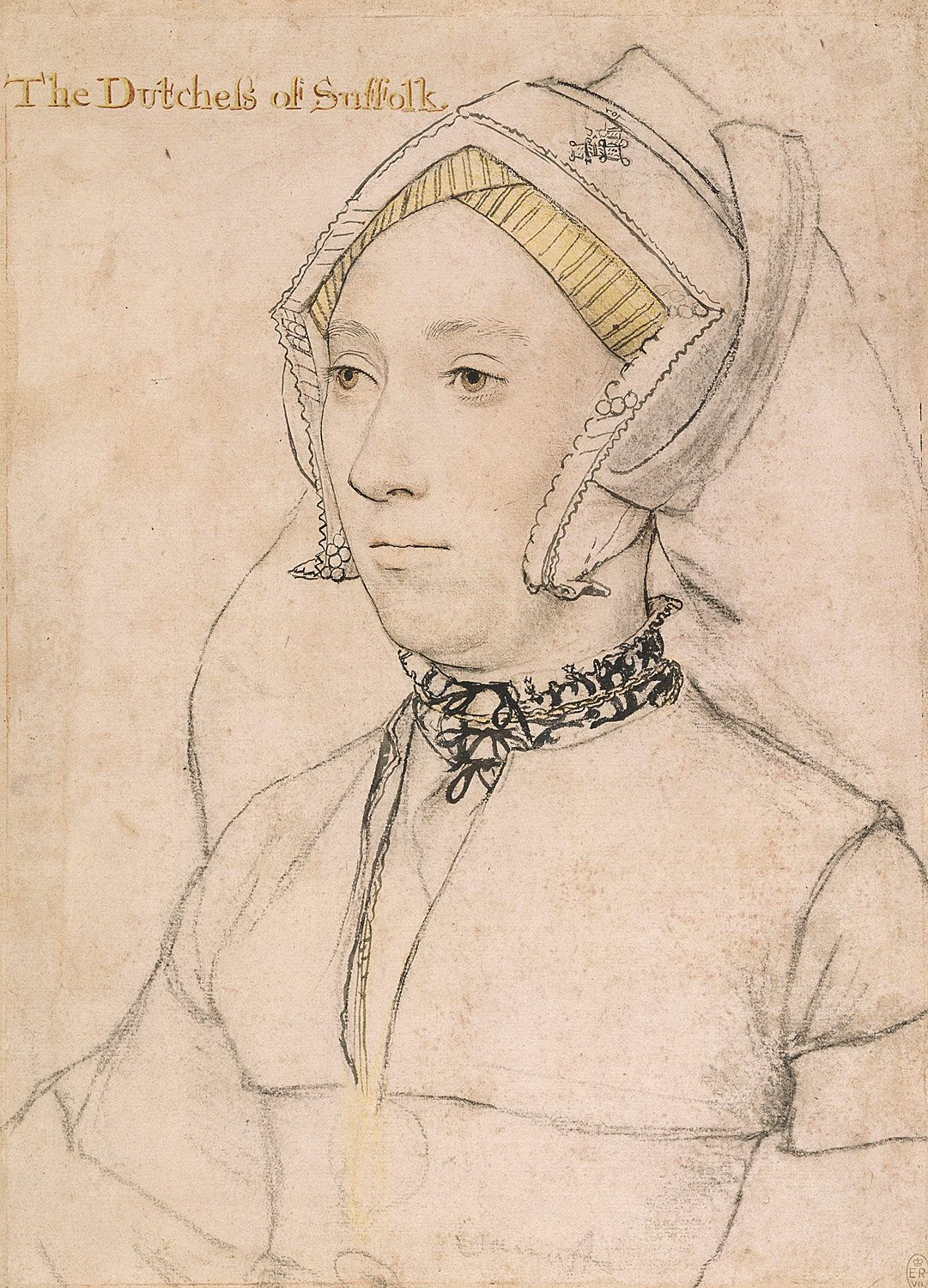
Katherine Willoughby, Duchess of Suffolk

He married Katherine Willoughby, the daughter and heiress of William, 11th Lord Willoughby, and widow of Charles Brandon, 1st Duke of Suffolk. The Berties had married for love around 1553, after Bertie had for several years served as her Master of the Horse and Gentleman Usher. The pair fled to the Continent during the reign of the Catholic Mary I and the Counter-Reformation. They ignored commands to return, and their estates were sequestered. They travelled first to Cleves and then Polish–Lithuanian Commonwealth. They returned in 1559 soon after the accession of the more Protestant Elizabeth I and had their lands restored to them. Their story is recorded in Foxe's Book of Martyrs.

Bertie was the father of Susan Bertie, Countess of Kent and Peregrine Bertie, 13th Baron Willoughby de Eresby, prominent Protestants during the reign of Elizabeth. Peregrine was named for their wandering life in exile.

Andrew Lloyd Webber, the British composer of "Cats", "The Phantom of the Opera" and other successes, is a descendent of Katherine and Richard Bertie.

Bertie was member of parliament (MP) for Lincolnshire from 1562 to 1567. In 1564 he attended the Queen in her visit to Cambridge University, and was granted an MA. In 1570 he unsuccessfully claimed the Barony Willoughby de Eresby in right of his wife.

He was appointed a justice of the peace for Lindsey by 1564 and High Sheriff of Lincolnshire for 1564–65.

He died at Bourne, Lincolnshire on 9 April 1582 and is buried, together with his wife Katherine, in the Willoughby Chapel, St James Church, Spilsby, Lincolnshire.
