= María de Salinas =

Spanish noblewoman

María de Salinas, Baroness Willoughby d’Eresby (c. 1490 – 1539) was an English noblewoman and courtier from Spain. She was a confidante and lady-in-waiting to Catherine of Aragon, Queen of England.

== Family background ==
María was the daughter of Martín de Salinas (d. 1503), and Josefa González de Salas, who were members of the royal household in Castile with her father being secretary to Isabella, Queen of Portugal. The family was probably related to the royal family. She had a younger sister, Ines, born in 1491, who died sometime after she did and another sister named Pascuala.

== As a lady-in-waiting ==
It is thought that María at first was a lady-in-waiting to Isabella of Castile before entering into the service of her daughter the infanta Catherine.

The exact date that María became a maid-of-honour to Catherine of Aragon is unknown, but is thought to have been in 1501. There is some confusion as Maria de Rojas, daughter of the count de Salinas (and also cousin to de Salinas), was also a lady in waiting to Catherine. A more reliable date for her appointment would be 1503/1504 as her cousin returned to Spain to get married and was replaced by Maria de Salinas.

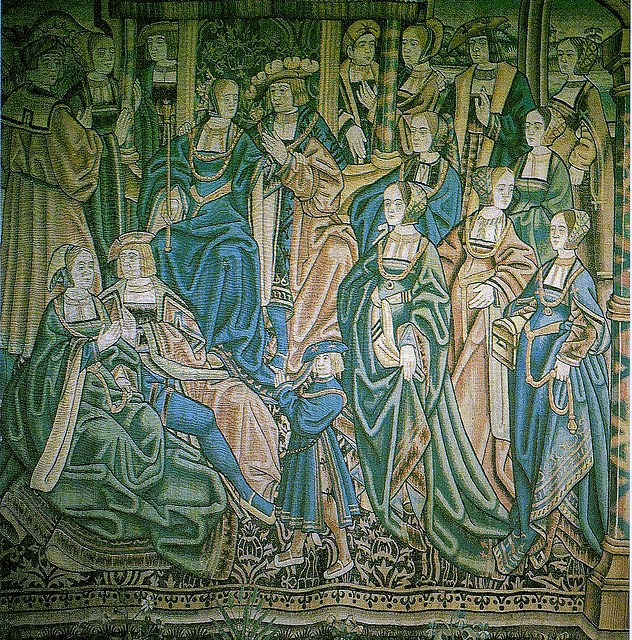
Arthur Prince of Wales & Catherine of Aragon surrounded by her ladies, Maria among them.

Her sister Ines, who was also thought to be one of Catherine's ladies-in-waiting, had married Francis Guevara, a Spaniard living in Stanyott, Lincolnshire. María remained unmarried until 5 June 1516, when she married the English nobleman William Willoughby, 11th Baron Willoughby de Eresby. Grimsthorpe Castle was granted by King Henry VIII to the de Eresby family on the occasion of María's marriage. María and William had one child, Catherine, who succeeded to her father's barony.

Henry VIII esteemed María so much that in 1522, he named a ship Mary Willoughby in her honour. In 1511, María became the godmother to Mary Brandon, the daughter of Charles Brandon, 1st Duke of Suffolk and his second wife Anne Browne. Lord Willoughby died in 1526; the Duke of Suffolk made María's daughter, Catherine, his ward shortly thereafter, marrying her as his fourth wife in 1533.

== Death of Catherine of Aragon and later life ==
María was a devoted friend to Catherine of Aragon. In August 1532, shortly before Catherine's marriage to Henry was annulled, she was ordered to leave Catherine's household and not to make any attempt to communicate with her. In September 1534, when Catherine's health deteriorated, María begged permission to visit her but was denied. On 5 January 1536 she forced her way into Kimbolton Castle to see Catherine, having again been refused permission to visit. Catherine died in her arms two days later.

María lived for another three years, spending much of the time in her London residence at Barbican. Her daughter Catherine Willoughby, Duchess of Suffolk, became a close friend of Henry VIII's sixth wife, Catherine Parr, who was also the goddaughter of Catherine of Aragon. In 1546, there were rumours that Henry was planning to have his marriage to Catherine Parr annulled and make the widowed Duchess his seventh wife.

== Cultural depictions ==
María is the main character in All Manner of Things—the second novel of Wendy J. Dunn's Falling Pomegranate Seeds duology. 978-0648715221

María is depicted as the drummer of the band in the musical Six, along with three other ladies in waiting of the other queens.

She was portrayed by the actress Margaret Ford in the 1970 BBC series The Six Wives of Henry VIII.
