= English ship Mary Willoughby =

History

England
- Name: Mary Willoughby
- In service: Listed from 1532
- Captured: By the Scots in 1536; Recaptured in 1547
- Fate: Sold in 1573

Scotland
- Name: Mary Willoughby
- Acquired: 1532
- In service: 1536
- Captured: 1547
- Fate: returned to English navy

General characteristics
- Tons burthen: 140 bm; 160 bm (from 1551)
- Sail plan: Full-rigged ship
- Complement: 146 sailors 14 gunners
- Armament: in 1548; a serpentine; 3 port pieces; 4 slings; a quarter sling; 13 bases; a hagbut.

Mary Willoughby was a ship of the English Tudor navy. She appears in the navy lists from 1532 during the reign of Henry VIII. She was named after Maria Willoughby, a lady-in-waiting and close friend of Catherine of Aragon. The ship was taken by the Scots in 1536 and was included in the Royal Scots Navy, but the English recaptured her on 15 September 1547. The ship was rebuilt in 1551, increasing in size from 140 bm to 160 bm (although no dimensions are recorded). She was finally sold in 1573.

== Scottish service ==
The Mary Willoughby was captured by the Scottish galleys of Hector Maclean of Duart in 1533. James V of Scotland employed the ship in his voyages to the Isles. The skipper of the Mary Willoughby was Hans Anderson, who lived in Leith. When James V went to France in August 1536, the Mary Willoughby carried his armour. According to an English observer, John Hutton, the Mary Willoughby was the most impressive vessel in James's small fleet at Dieppe, and a "comely ship and well in order". The ship had a re-fit at Dieppe costing over £1,000 Scots and then sailed to Bordeaux to collect the king's wine.

On 19 July 1539 cannon from Edinburgh Castle were put on the Mary Willoughby for the maiden voyage of Unicorn. On 24 August 1539 Mary of Guise and James V made a pilgrimage to the Isle of May in the Forth. They took three ships, the Unicorn, the Little Unicorn, and the Mary Willoughby. Hans Andersoun mended the ship at Leith in 1539, and it had a major re-fit between November 1539 and June 1540, by Florence Cornetoun costing £2566-18s-8d Scots.

Cardinal Beaton sailed in the Mary Willoughby to the northern and western isles of Scotland with James V in 1540. The Cardinal paid £6 for painting her in July 1541, and sailed to France. In December 1542, Mary Willoughby, Salamander and Lion blockaded a London merchant ship called Antony of Bruges in a creek on the coast of Brittany. The Mary Willoughby fired on the Anthony, and its crew abandoned ship. The French authority at "Poldavy Haven" accepted a Scottish warrant shown to them by the Captain, named Kerr.

=== War of the Rough Wooing ===
The Mary Willoughby captained by John Barton, the Lyon, Andrew, and three French-built ships, and other smaller vessels, menaced the quay of Bridlington on 19 September 1544. They captured and burnt a hulk at Bridlington and sunk the Valentine of Scarborough. It was thought the Scottish ships might try to burn Lindisfarne, so orders were given to repair the old bulwark or blockhouse there. After a few months troubling towns on the English coast, the fleet returned to Leith in December to pick up the French ambassador and take him to France.

An English spy Thomas Forster saw Mary Willoughby "coming in" at Leith in July 1545 with six other ships bringing wine, brass field guns and arquebuses from France. They had passed by the Irish seas. In March 1547 Mary Willoughby and another Scottish ship, reportedly Great Spaniard of 200 tons, were blockading the New Haven by Dieppe. William Patten wrote that Mary Willoughby was captured on the Forth at Blackness Castle by Edward Clinton and Richard Broke, captain of the Galley Subtle, on 15 September 1547.

== Later English service against Scotland ==
The armaments of Mary Willoughby were listed in an inventory of 1 January 1548. The cannon included; a serpentine; 3 port pieces; 4 slings; a quarter sling; 9 double bases and 4 single bases; and a hagbut. Handarms included 12 bills, 7 moorish pikes, and three spears. There were 146 crew with 14 gunners.

After re-construction in 1551, in August 1557 the ship was one of a fleet of 12 commanded by John Clere that unsuccessfully assaulted the town of Kirkwall on Orkney, landing troops and six field guns on Orkney to attack the castle of Kirkwall, St. Magnus Cathedral and the Bishop's Palace. Seven other ships of the fleet were royal, which included the Salamander, New Bark, Minion, Henry, Bull, Tiger, Greyhound, and Gabriel.

In October 1558, the English raided Campbeltown Loch and Kintyre because of the activities of the Clan MacDonald in Ireland. The Earl of Sussex sailed from Dublin in the Mary Willoughby with a small fleet. They burnt farms and houses including Saddell, a castle of James MacDonald of Dunyvaig and Glynnes (died 1565), and then marched south to burn Dunaverty and Machrimore. He then burnt farms on Arran, Bute, and Cumbrae.

Veteran ships of the Kirkwall raid came to the aid of the Scottish Protestants at the Siege of Leith in January 1560, including Mary Willoughby, all under the command of Willam Winter.

Mary Willoughby was sold in 1573.
