= Henry Grey, 4th Earl of Kent =

English peer

- Born: c. 1495
- Died: 24 September 1562
- Spouse: Anne Blennerhassett
- Children: 2
- Father: George Grey
- Relatives: Richard Grey (half-brother); William Herbert (grandfather); Edmund Grey (grandfather); Katherine Percy (grandmother); Reginald Grey (grandson); Henry Grey (grandson); Charles Grey (grandson)

Henry Grey, 4th Earl of Kent (c. 1495 – 24 September 1562) was Earl of Kent from 1524 to his death.

== Biography ==
He was a son of George Grey, 2nd Earl of Kent and his second wife Catherine Herbert. His maternal grandparents were William Herbert, 1st Earl of Pembroke and Anne Devereux.

His father was previously married to Anne Woodville, a daughter of Richard Woodville, 1st Earl Rivers and Jacquetta of Luxembourg. His only known paternal half-brother was Richard Grey, 3rd Earl of Kent.

Richard succeeded their father as Earl of Kent but wound up heavily in debt, probably through gambling, and was forced to alienate most of his property. A good part ended up in the crown's hands; historians disagree regarding what this says about the relationship of Henry VII of England with the aristocracy.

When Richard died childless, Henry inherited the title of Earl of Kent and what was left of the associated property. Henry tried, with little success, to reacquire the property Richard had sold, and had to live as a modest gentleman, never formally taking title as earl.

He married Anne Blennerhassett daughter of John Blennerhassett and Jane Higham. They had two children:

- Henry Grey (1520–1545). He married Margaret St. John. They were parents to Reginald Grey, 5th Earl of Kent, Henry Grey, 6th Earl of Kent and Charles Grey, 7th Earl of Kent.
- Katherine Grey. She is mentioned to have married twice, to unnamed members of the Slayton and Spencer families. Uncertain if she had descendants.

== Sources ==
- The Complete Peerage

Peerage of England
Preceded by Richard Grey	Earl of Kent; 1524–1562	Succeeded by Reginald Grey
