= Earl of Kent =

Title in the peerages of England and the United Kingdom

- Creation date: 1067 first creation; 1141 second creation; 1227 third creation; 1321 fourth creation; 1360 fifth creation; 1461 sixth creation; 1465 seventh creation; 1866 eighth creation
- Created by: King William I first creation; King Stephen second creation; King Henry III third creation; King Edward II fourth creation; King Edward III fifth creation; King Edward IV sixth creation; King Edward IV seventh creation; Queen Victoria eighth creation
- Peerage: Peerage of England (1st-7th creations); Peerage of the United Kingdom (8th creation)
- First holder: Odo of Bayeux
- Last holder: Alfred, Duke of Saxe-Coburg and Gotha
- Extinction date: 1088 first creation; 1155 second creation; 1243 third creation; 1385 (merged with the fifth creation) fourth creation; 1408 fifth creation; 1463 sixth creation; 1740 seventh creation; 1900 eighth creation

The peerage title Earl of Kent has been created seven times in the Peerage of England and once in the Peerage of the United Kingdom. In fiction, the Earl of Kent is also known as a prominent supporting character in William Shakespeare's tragedy King Lear.

== Earls of Kent, first creation (1067) ==
After William, Duke of Normandy conquered England, Odo, Bishop of Bayeux, his half-brother, was awarded the Earldom of Kent, the first creation. In 1076, Odo was found guilty of defrauding the crown, and most of his properties were forfeited to the crown, but he was not executed. In 1082, he was arrested for planning a military campaign to Rome and in 1088 his titles were forfeited. He died in 1097 at Palermo, on his way to join the First Crusade.

- Odo, Earl of Kent, and Bishop of Bayeux (died 1097) (forfeit 1088).

== Earls of Kent, second creation (1141) ==
William of Ypres was the principal lieutenant of King Stephen and was thus rewarded the Earldom of Kent. He was deprived of the title in 1155, by King Henry II.

- William de Ipres, Earl of Kent (c. 1095–1165) (deprived 1155)

== Earls of Kent, third creation (1227) ==
Hubert de Burgh was a loyal supporter of King John and in 1227 was created Earl of Kent by John's son and successor, King Henry III of England. He died in 1243, his Earldom becoming extinct, as the king had his issue from his first marriage disinherited.

- Hubert de Burgh, Earl of Kent (died 1243)

== Earls of Kent, fourth creation (1321) ==
Edmund of Woodstock was sixth son of Edward I of England. He was created Earl of Kent in 1321. Following his execution for high treason, his son Edmund became Earl of Kent. Edmund died the following year and the Earldom of Kent was inherited by his younger brother John, 3rd Earl of Kent. John died aged 22 and all his land was passed to his sister Joan, Countess of Kent. The Earldom of Kent, as a royal earldom, became extinct. Joan married Sir Thomas Holland, who was created Earl of Kent in his own right, in what is considered a separate creation of the Earldom of Kent (see below).

- Edmund of Woodstock, 1st Earl of Kent (1301–1330) (attainted 1330)
- Edmund, 2nd Earl of Kent (c. 1326–1331) (restored 1331)
- John, 3rd Earl of Kent (1330–1352)
- Joan, 4th Countess of Kent (1352–1385)

== Earls of Kent, fifth creation (1360) ==
The earls of Kent of this creation used Baron Holand (1353) as a subsidiary title; it became abeyant 1408. The first earl of Kent by this creation was the husband of Joan of Kent of the fifth creation.

- Thomas Holland, 1st Earl of Kent (died 1360)
- Thomas Holland, 2nd Earl of Kent (1350–1397)
- Thomas Holland, 3rd Earl of Kent (1372–1400)
- Edmund Holland, 4th Earl of Kent (1383–1408)

The line of the earls of Kent became extinct with the death of Edmund, the fourth earl.

The Holland Earls of Kent. Where an article exists, it can be found by clicking on the name.

== Earls of Kent, sixth creation (1461) ==
- William Neville, Earl of Kent (died 1463)

== Earls of Kent, seventh creation (1465) ==
The Greys were a baronial family with substantial property in Bedfordshire and Buckinghamshire, and later around Ruthin in Wales. They rose to greater prominence during the Wars of the Roses. Edmund Grey, Lord Grey of Ruthin, started out a Lancastrian, but switched to the Yorkist side at the Battle of Northampton. He was a member of Edward IV's council, became Lord Treasurer in 1463/4, was created Earl of Kent in 1465 and was keeper of the Tower of London in 1470. He remained loyal through Richard III's accession, taking part in his coronation (1483).

Edmund's son George, the 2nd Earl, had continued as a Yorkist, marrying Anne Woodville, a sister of Edward IV's queen Elizabeth Woodville. (He was half-first cousin - both being grandsons of Reynold 3rd Lord Grey of Ruthin - to Queen Elizabeth's first husband, Sir John Grey of Groby.) He later married Catherine Herbert, daughter of William Herbert, 1st Earl of Pembroke.

The third earl, Richard, was the son of the second earl and Anne Woodville. He wound up heavily in debt, probably through gambling, and was forced to alienate most of his property. A good part ended up in the crown's hands; historians disagree regarding what this says about Henry VII's relationship with the aristocracy.

He was succeeded as earl by his half-brother Henry, son of the second earl and Catherine Herbert. Henry tried, with little success, to reacquire the property Richard had sold, and had to live as a modest gentleman, never formally taking title as earl.

- Edmund Grey, 1st Earl of Kent (c. 1420–1490)
- George Grey, 2nd Earl of Kent (c. 1460–1503)
- Richard Grey, 3rd Earl of Kent (1481–1524)
- Henry Grey, 4th Earl of Kent (c. 1495–1562)
- Reginald Grey, 5th Earl of Kent (died 1573)
- Henry Grey, 6th Earl of Kent (1541–1615)
- Charles Grey, 7th Earl of Kent (c. 1545–1623)
- Henry Grey, 8th Earl of Kent (c. 1583–1639)
- Anthony Grey, 9th Earl of Kent (1557–1643)
- Henry Grey, 10th Earl of Kent (1594–1651)
- Anthony Grey, 11th Earl of Kent (1645–1702)
- Henry Grey, 12th Earl of Kent (1671–1740) (created Marquess of Kent in 1706, Duke of Kent in 1710) (all Kent titles were extinct on his death, though some others passed to Jemima Yorke, 2nd Marchioness Grey)

== Earls of Kent, eighth creation (1866) ==
- Alfred, Duke of Edinburgh, Earl of Kent (1844–1900)

Family tree of the Dukes, Marquesseses, and Earls of Kent, Dukes of Kent and Strathearn, and Dukes of Connaught and Strathearn, and other related titles

Earl of Kent (1st creation), 1020
Godwin, Earl of Wessex c. 1001–1053; 1st Earl of Kent	Herleva d. 1050
Earl of Kent (2nd creation), 1067
King Harold Godwinson c. 1022–1066	Leofwine Godwinson c. 1035–1066; 2nd Earl of Kent	King William I c. 1028–1087	Odo of Bayeux d. 1097; Earl of Kent
Earldom (1st creation) forfeit, 1066	Earldom (2nd creation) forfeit, 1088	Earl of Kent (3rd creation), 1141
William of Ypres c. 1090–1165; Earl of Kent
Earldom (3rd creation) forfeit, 1155	Earl of Kent (4th creation), 1227
Hubert de Burgh c. 1170–1243; Earl of Kent
King Edward I 1239–1307	Earldom (4th creation) extinct, 1243
King Edward II; 1284–1327
Earl of Kent (5th creation), 1321
King Edward III; 1312–1377	Edmund of Woodstock; 1301–1330; 1st Earl of Kent
Earldom (5th creation) attainted, 1330
Earldom (5th creation) restored, 1330	Baron Holand (2nd creation), 1353; Earl of Kent (6th creation), 1360
Edmund c. 1326–1331; 2nd Earl of Kent	John of Gaunt; 1340–1399; Duke of Lancaster	Edward the Black Prince; 1330–1376; Prince of Wales, Duke of Cornwall	Joan of Kent c. 1328–1385; Princess of Wales, 4th Countess of Kent suo jure 5th Baroness Wake of Liddell	Thomas Holland c. 1314–1360; 1st Earl of Kent, etc.	John; 1330–1352; 3rd Earl of Kent; 4th Baron Wake of Liddell
Earldom (5th creation) extinct, 1360
Elizabeth of Lancaster bef. 1363–1426	John Holland c. 1352–1400; Earl of Huntingdon, Duke of Exeter	Thomas Holland; 1350–1397; 2nd Earl of Kent, etc.
Constance Holland; 1387–1437	Thomas Holland; 1372–1400; 3rd Earl of Kent, etc. Duke of Surrey
Edmund Holland; 1383–1408; 4th Earl of Kent, etc.
Earl of Kent (7th creation), 1461	Earl of Kent (8th creation), 1465	Earldom (6th creation) extinct and Barony Holand (2nd creation) abeyant, 1408
William Neville c. 1405–1463; Earl of Kent; Baron Fauconberg jure uxoris	Edmund Grey; 1416–1490; 1st Earl of Kent; 4th Baron Grey de Ruthyn
Earldom (7th creation) extinct, 1463
Anne Woodville c. 1438–1489	George Grey c. 1460–1503; 2nd Earl of Kent; 5th Baron Grey de Ruthyn
Richard Grey; 1481–1524; 3rd Earl of Kent; 6th Baron Grey de Ruthyn	Anthony Grey	Henry Grey c. 1495–1562; 4th Earl of Kent; 7th Baron Grey de Ruthyn
George Grey	Henry Grey; 1520–1545
Anthony Grey; 1557–1643; 9th Earl of Kent	Reginald Grey d. 1573; 5th Earl of Kent; 8th Baron Grey de Ruthyn	Henry Grey; 1541–1615; 6th Earl of Kent; 9th Baron Grey de Ruthyn	Charles Grey c. 1545–1623; 7th Earl of Kent; 10th Baron Grey de Ruthyn
Henry Grey; 1594–1651; 10th Earl of Kent	Henry Grey c. 1583–1639; 8th Earl of Kent; 11th Baron Grey de Ruthyn
Baron Lucas (2nd creation), 1663
Mary (Lucas) Grey d. 1702; 1st Baroness Lucas of Crudwell	Anthony Grey; 1645–1702; 11th Earl of Kent
Marquess of Kent, Earl of Harold, and Viscount Goderich (1st creation), 1706; Duke of Kent (1st creation), 1710; Marquess Grey, 1740
Henry Grey; 1671–1740; Duke of Kent, etc., 1st Marquess Grey; 12th Earl of Kent; 2nd Baron Lucas of Crudwell
Earldom (8th creation), Marquessate, and Dukedom of Kent, Earldom of Harold, and Viscountcy Goderich (1st creation) extinct, 1740
Anthony Grey; 1695–1723; 3rd Baron Lucas, styled Earl of Harold	Amabel Grey
Jemima (Campbell) Yorke; 1723–1797; 2nd Marchioness Grey, 4th Baroness Lucas	King George III; 1738–1820
Marquessate Grey extinct, 1797
Earl de Grey, 1816 (not the same as Earl Grey)	Earl of Dublin (1st creation), 1766	Duke of Kent and Strathearn and Earl of Dublin (2nd creation), 1799	See also: Earl of Strathearn
Amabel Hume-Campbell; 1751–1833; 1st Countess de Grey	Mary Jemima Yorke; 1757–1830	Prince Henry Frederick; 1745–1790; Earl of Dublin	Prince Edward Augustus; 1767–1820; Duke of Kent and Strathearn, etc.
Earldom of Dublin (1st creation) extinct, 1790	Dukedom of Kent and Strathearn and Earldom of Dublin (2nd creation) extinct, 1820
Viscount Goderich (2nd creation), 1827; Earl of Ripon, 1833
Thomas Philip (Robinson) de Grey; 1781–1859; 2nd Earl de Grey	Frederick John Robinson; 1782–1859; 1st Earl of Ripon, etc.	Queen Victoria; 1819–1901
Marquess of Ripon, 1871	Earl of Dublin (3rd creation), 1849/1850	Earl of Kent (9th creation), 1866	Duke of Connaught and Strathearn, 1874
George Robinson; 1827–1909; 1st Marquess of Ripon, 2nd Earl of Ripon, etc., 3rd Earl de Grey, 4th Baron Grantham	Albert Edward, Prince of Wales; 1841–1910; Earl of Dublin later King Edward VII	Prince Alfred Ernest Albert; 1844–1900; Duke of Edinburgh, Duke of Saxe-Coburg and Gotha, Earl of Kent	Prince Arthur; 1850–1942; 1st Duke of Connaught and Strathearn
Earldom of Dublin merged in the Crown, 1901
(Frederick) Oliver Robinson; 1852–1923; 2nd Marquess of Ripon, 3rd Earl of Ripon, etc., 4th Earl de Grey, 5th Baron Grantham	King George V 1865–1936	Prince Arthur of Connaught; 1883–1938
Marquessate and Earldom of Ripon, Earldom de Grey, Viscountcy Goderich, and Barony Grantham extinct, 1923
Duke of Kent (2nd creation), Earl of St Andrews, and Baron Downpatrick, 1934
Prince George; 1902–1942; 1st Duke of Kent, etc.	Prince Alastair Arthur; 1914–1943; 2nd Duke of Connaught and Strathearn
Dukedom of Connaught and Strathearn extinct, 1943
Prince Edward b. 1935; 2nd Duke of Kent, etc.	7) Prince Michael of Kent b. 1942
1) George Philip Nicholas Windsor b. 1962 styled Earl of St Andrews and heir apparent to the dukedom of Kent	3) Nicholas Charles Edward Jonathan Windsor b. 1970	8) Frederick Michael George David Louis Windsor b. 1979
2) Edward Edmund Maximilian George Windsor b. 1988 styled Lord Downpatrick	4) Albert Louis Philip Edward Windsor b. 2007	5) Leopold Ernest Augustus Guelph Windsor b. 2009	6) Louis Arthur Nicholas Felix Windsor b. 2014
