= Henry Grey, 6th Earl of Kent =

English peer (1541–1615)

- Born: 1541
- Died: 31 January 1615 (aged 73–74)
- Spouse: Mary Cotton
- Relatives: Charles Grey (brother); Reginald Grey (brother); Henry Grey (grandfather)

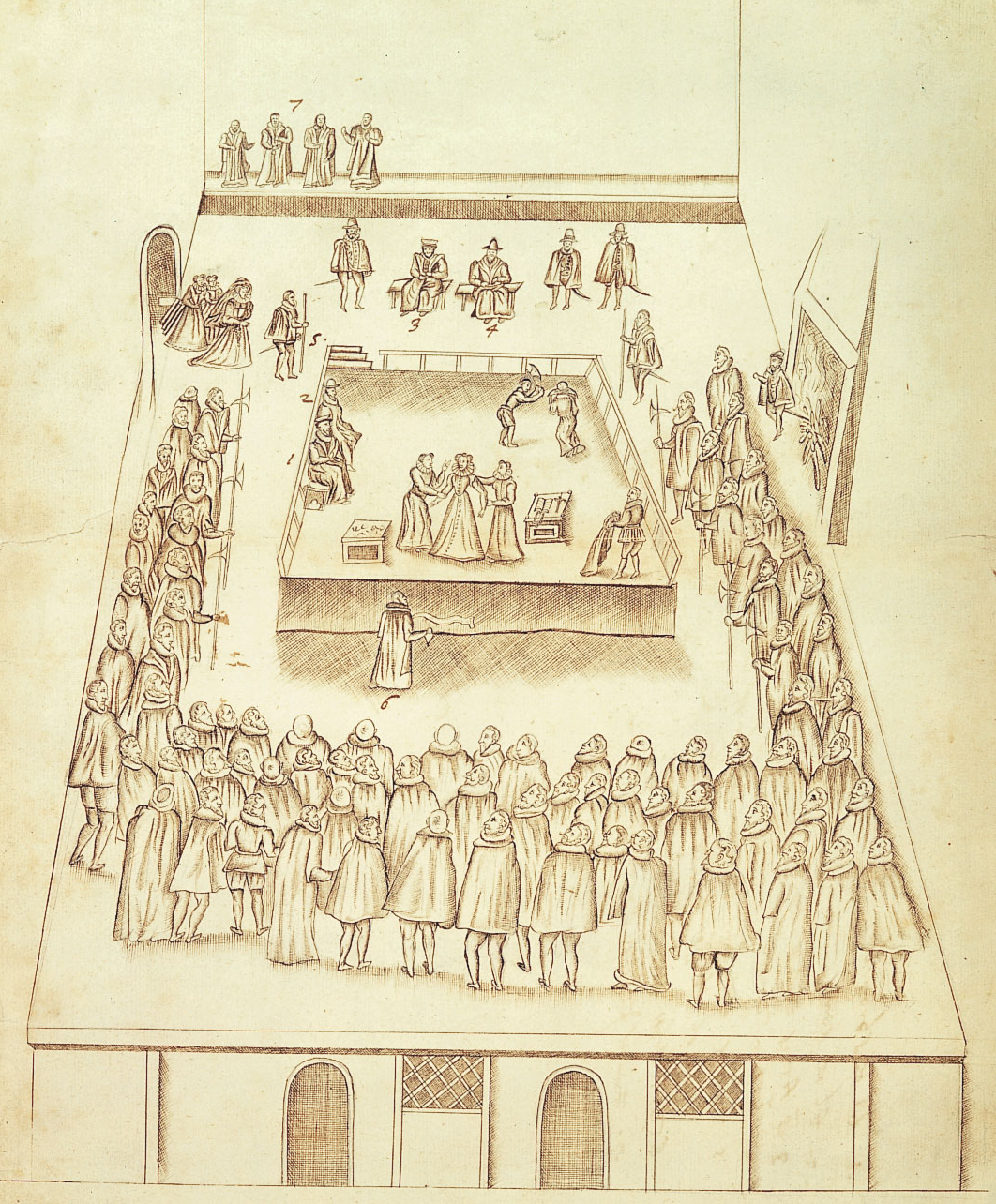
The execution of Mary, Queen of Scots at Fotheringhay Castle on 8 February 1587, drawn by Robert Beale, Clerk of the Privy Council, an eyewitness. The official witnesses, Henry Grey, 6th Earl of Kent and George Talbot, 6th Earl of Shrewsbury are seated on the scaffold at left, identified as numbers 1 and 2. Sir Amias Paulet, Mary's gaoler, is identified as 3, top, seated left below dais

Henry Grey, 6th Earl of Kent (1541 – 31 January 1615) was an English peer.

He was a son of Henry Grey (1520–1545) and Margaret St. John and grandson of Henry Grey, 4th Earl of Kent. He was a younger brother of Reginald Grey, 5th Earl of Kent and an older brother of Charles Grey, 7th Earl of Kent.

He served as Lord Lieutenant of Bedfordshire from the 1580s until his death. In 1587 he was one of the official witnesses at the execution of Mary, Queen of Scots.

He was married to Mary Cotton, daughter of Sir George Cotton and Mary Onley. There were no known children from the marriage; he was thus succeeded by his younger brother, Charles.

== See also ==
- Wrest Park

== Sources ==
- The Complete Peerage

Political offices
Preceded by Unknown	Lord Lieutenant of Bedfordshire; 1586–1615	Succeeded by The Earl of Kent
Peerage of England
Preceded by Reginald Grey	Earl of Kent; 1573–1615	Succeeded by Charles Grey
