= Reginald Grey, 5th Earl of Kent =

English peer

- Born: Before 1541
- Died: 17 March 1573
- Education: St John's College, Cambridge
- Spouse: Susan Bertie (m. 1570)
- Relatives: Charles Grey (brother); Henry Grey (brother); Henry Grey (grandfather)

Reginald Grey, 5th Earl of Kent (before 1541 – 17 March 1573) was an English peer.

== Biography ==
He was a son of Henry Grey (1520–1545) and Margaret St John. His paternal grandparents were Henry Grey, 4th Earl of Kent and Anne Blennerhassett. Reginald Grey was educated at St John's College, Cambridge.

In 1570, Gray married Susan Bertie, daughter of Katherine Brandon, Duchess of Suffolk and her second husband Richard Bertie. There were no known children from this marriage.

He is mentioned in the Annales Rerum Gestarum Angliae et Hiberniae Regnate Elizabetha by William Camden, in the entry for year 1573:

"18. Not long after dyed also Reginald Grey Earle of Kent, whom the Queene a yeare before had raised from a private man to the honour of Earle of Kent, after that this title had lyen asleepe the space of fifty yeares from the death of Richard Grey Earle of Kent, who had set his Patrimony flying, and was elder Brother to this mans Grandfather. In this honour succeeded unto him Henry his Brother."

This was a reference to the state of the title at this point. His great-uncle Richard Grey, 3rd Earl of Kent had wound up heavily in debt, probably through gambling, and was forced to alienate most of his property. Henry Grey had inherited the claim to the title but little property and lived mostly as a gentleman, a private citizen. Reginald lived the same way until Elizabeth I restored to him his title and part of his property in 1572 following a campaign supported by his mother in law Katherine Brandon, Duchess of Suffolk.

His younger brothers Henry and Charles successively inherited the Kent title following his death on 17 March 1573.

Peerage of England
Preceded by Henry Grey	Earl of Kent; 1562–1573	Succeeded by Henry Grey
