= Barberini Venus =

Statue of Venus (modest Venus)

The Barberini Venus, Jenkins Venus or Weddell Venus is a sculpture and copy of the Aphrodite of Cnidus, along the lines of the Venus de' Medici. Its torso is a Hadrianic copy in Parian marble of the same type as the Venus de' Medici, with 18th-century restorations.

== 18th century ==
The sculpture of Venus was previously in the Barberini collection, during which time its left leg and the support were added. The Barberini Venus was purchased in 1763 by Gavin Hamilton, a Scottish connoisseur in Rome who acted as guide to the British milordi. It was later bought by Thomas Jenkins, the English antiquities dealer and banker to the English community established in Rome, and then from him in the spring of 1765 by William Weddell of Newby Hall, Yorkshire, who was on the Grand Tour. The undisclosed sum for which it changed hands this third time was reputedly the most ever paid for an antiquity in the eighteenth century.

A customs declaration, intended to speed its export from the papal dominions, details the extensive restorations it had undergone in Jenkins' care. The arms were restored while the sculpture belonged to Hamilton or Jenkins – Jenkins often employed Pietro Pacilli or Bartolomeo Cavaceppi for such work – and it also received a head from a separate source.

Weddell returned to Newby in the summer of 1765 and commissioned first the Yorkshire architect John Carr and then, in 1766, Robert Adam to design a suitable gallery for the sculptures and other antiquities he had purchased in Rome. The result was a domed rotunda in which the Weddell Venus had a prominent niche, flanked by rectangular galleries, decorated with refined Neoclassical plasterwork and forming a top-lit Neoclassical tribune.

== Auction ==
It broke the world auction record for an antiquity after selling for almost £8 million at Christie's London in 2002. After the auction, export was delayed while a vain attempt was made to match the bid of Sheikh Saud-al-Thani, cousin of the Emir of Qatar, where the Weddell Venus currently resides. A laser-made Carrara marble copy replaces the original at Newby.
