= Newby with Mulwith =

Civil parish in North Yorkshire, England

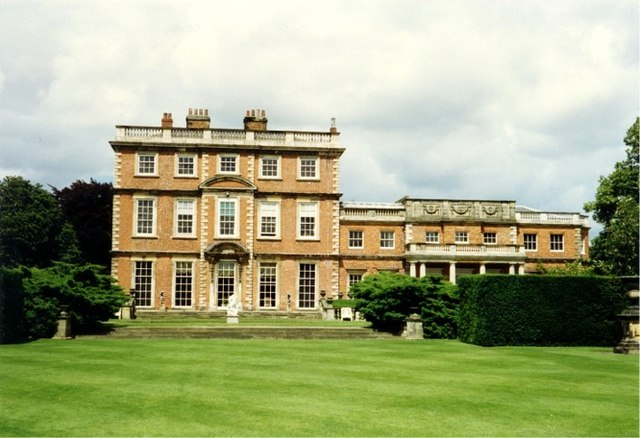
Newby Hall

Newby with Mulwith is a civil parish in the county of North Yorkshire, England. It lies 3 miles (5 km) south east of Ripon, on the north bank of the River Ure and adjacent to the village of Skelton-on-Ure. Most of the parish consists of the grounds of Newby Hall. Mulwith is a single farm in the south east of the parish. The population of the parish was estimated at 40 in 2013.

Newby with Mulwith was historically a township in the parish of Ripon in the West Riding of Yorkshire. It became a separate civil parish in 1866. In 1974 it was transferred to the new county of North Yorkshire. From 1974 to 2023 it was part of the Borough of Harrogate, it is now administered by the unitary North Yorkshire Council.

== See also ==
- Listed buildings in Newby with Mulwith
