= Spectre of Newby Church =

Popular photograph perceived to contain a ghost

Coordinates: 54.108°N 1.449°W

The Reverend K. F. Lord's photograph

The Spectre of Newby Church (or the Newby Monk) is the name given to a figure found in a photograph taken in the Church of Christ the Consoler, on the grounds of Newby Hall in North Yorkshire, England, United Kingdom. The image was taken in 1963 by the Reverend Kenneth F. Lord.

== Supposed depiction of a 16th-century monk ==
As the figure appears to resemble a human, much speculation has been had regarding what type of person might be in the image. Most speculation by believers has concluded that it resembles a 16th-century monk, with a white shroud over his face, possibly to mask leprosy or another disfigurement. Others contend that it is an accomplice in a costume.

Initial claims suggested that the figure would measure at 8 ft 0 in (2.44 m) or 9 ft 0 in (2.74 m) tall, but its feet are not visible and it could easily be standing on a box, giving the impression of height.

== Resemblance to double exposure hoaxes ==
There have been unsubstantiated claims that the photo was examined for the BBC in either the 1970s or 1980s and that the experts believed the image was not the result of double exposure; however, there has been no public report matching these alleged findings. Rick Burden, founder of the Ghost Hunters of Australia website, believes the image to be "probably fake." It resembles many other double exposure hoaxes.

== See also ==
- Solway Firth Spaceman
- The Brown Lady
