= Thomas Jenkins (antiquary) =

Dealer and entrepreneur in 18th century Rome

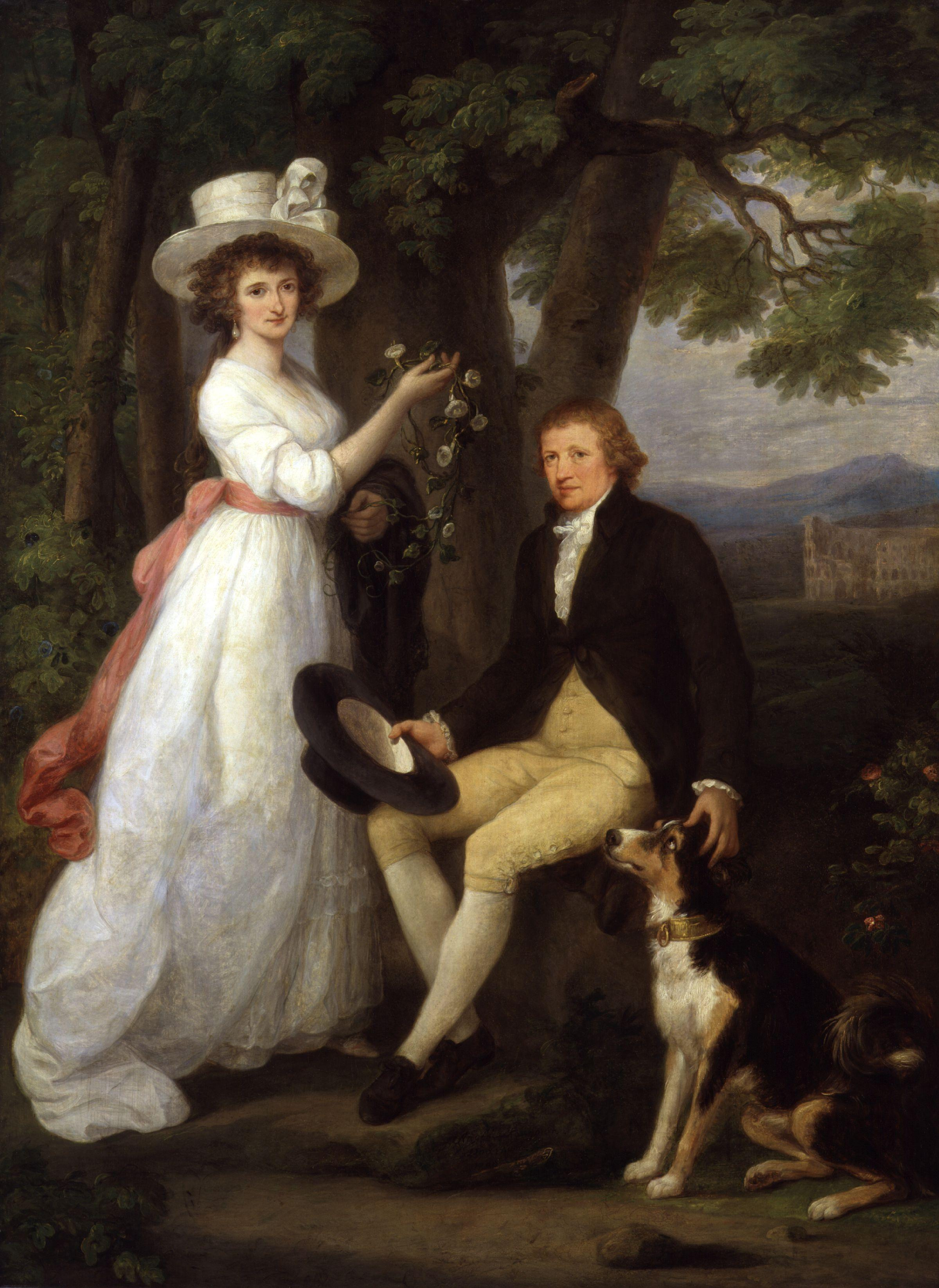
A 1790 portrait of Thomas Jenkins with his niece Anna Maria by Angelica Kauffman

Thomas Jenkins (c. 1722–1798) was a British artist who went to Rome accompanying the British landscape-painter Richard Wilson about 1750 and remained behind, establishing himself in the city by serving as cicerone and sometimes banker to the visiting British, becoming a dealer in Roman sculpture and antiquities to a largely British clientele and an agent for gentlemen who wished a portrait or portrait-bust as a memento of the Grand Tour.

== Biography ==
Thomas Jenkins was born in Sidbury in Devon in 1722 (and not in Rome as first noted by Thomas Ashby and followed by other scholars) Afterwards he studied painting with Thomas Hudson in London and from 1753 practised as a painter in Rome, where he associated with the painters Richard Wilson and Gavin Hamilton. Like several other artists in Rome, Jenkins judged that he could make a better living as a guide and dealer than as a painter; and in the course of time he became the leading connoisseur and antiquary to British visitors.

His manoeuvres to keep other artists in Rome from direct contact with visiting potential clients appear like a leitmotiv in the letters written from Rome and Tivoli in 1758 by the artist Jonathan Skelton, described as a "Jacobite" by Jenkins. Among the antiquities that passed through Jenkins's hands, often improved by restorers like Bartolomeo Cavaceppi, was a version of the Discobolus discovered in Hadrian's Villa at Tivoli, which Jenkins sold to Charles Townley (now in the British Museum, London). Jenkins also exported paintings to London. Jenkins also helped form the collections of William Petty (later Lord Shelburne and Lord Lansdowne), Henry Blundell (on his Grand Tour in 1765–66, for Ince Blundell Hall, Lancashire, including the 'Jenkins Venus' or "Barberini Venus" from Palazzo Barberini) and Lyde Browne of Wimbledon (which were eventually bought by Empress Catherine II for the Hermitage).

In 1770 a dispensation from Pope Clement XIV enabled Jenkins and the painter-dealer Gavin Hamilton to manage the dispersal of the Mattei antiquities, which had formed one of the most-visited private collections in Rome. Clement made a first selection for his Museo Pio-Clementino at the Vatican before permitting export, with Jenkins and Hamilton acting as agents for Don Giuseppe Mattei. By the time the three volumes of Monumenta Mattheiana were issued, 1776–79, most of the Mattei marbles, some bought by Jenkins directly, were no longer in Italy.

Jenkins also dealt in modern works of sculpture: in 1786 he purchased Gian Lorenzo Bernini's Neptune and Glaucus from the gardens of Villa Montalto; as a consequence, conserved in the Victoria & Albert Museum, it is the only Bernini sculpture in Britain.

Jenkins kept an apartment in a palazzo in the via del Corso, in the heart of Rome, in the area that was most frequented by the foreigners, between Piazza di Spagna, with its Caffè Inglese, and Piazza del Popolo. Essential to Jenkins' modus vivendi was that he was known to everyone, owners of saleable antiquities, Roman and foreign artists and sculptors, and antiquaries like Cardinal Alessandro Albani and Johann Joachim Winckelmann.

From the 1750s Jenkins was closely involved with Giovanni Battista Piranesi, who dedicated to him the frontispiece of his Raccolta di alcuni disegni del Guercino (1764). Jenkins was elected an Honorary Fellow of the London Society of Antiquaries in 1757, the same year Piranesi was elected, and they were elected together to the Accademia di San Luca in January 1761. (Jenkins did not deliver the official portrait that membership in the Accademia required until 1791; it is by Anton Maron.) Jenkins kept up a constant correspondence with the Society of Antiquaries, and sent them at intervals his drawings of recently discovered antiquities, not all of which were for sale through his agencies. A series was published in 1965.

Privately Jenkins also acted as an unofficial spy for the British government, keeping watch on the comings and goings of visitors with Jacobite sympathies at the seat of the Stuart Pretender, James Francis Edward Stuart. This gave him a shady reputation, particularly among Scottish visitors. James Adam, brother of the architect Robert Adam, heard of Jenkins in Florence, even before he reached Rome, and took him for a countryman: "We have another excellent countryman at Rome who plays his cards there to admiration: Bob will remember him – his name is Jenkins. Last winter he sold no less than £5000 worth of pictures &ca. to the English of which every person of any knowledge is convinced he put £4000 in his pocket." Andrew Lumisden reported to his brother-in-law Robert Strange (November 1760) that Jenkins had long been noted "for his villainies. However by consummate impudence joined to the honourable office of spy, he gets himself recommended to many of the English travellers".

By 1792 Jenkins had purchased the manor of Sidmouth near his birthplace; the town was becoming a minor vacation spot, and he built Fortfield Terrace, designed by London architect Michael Novosielski, for visitors. The manor passed to Jenkins' grand-nephew, also named Thomas Jenkins, on Jenkins' death.

Jenkins' will was made in Rome in December 1797 without legal advice and continued to cause legal disputes well into the 19th century. He left Rome on the arrival of the French troops, abandoned his valuable collections and came to England, dying as soon as he landed at Yarmouth.
