= Church of Christ the Consoler =

Christ the Consoler
- Church of Christ the Consoler
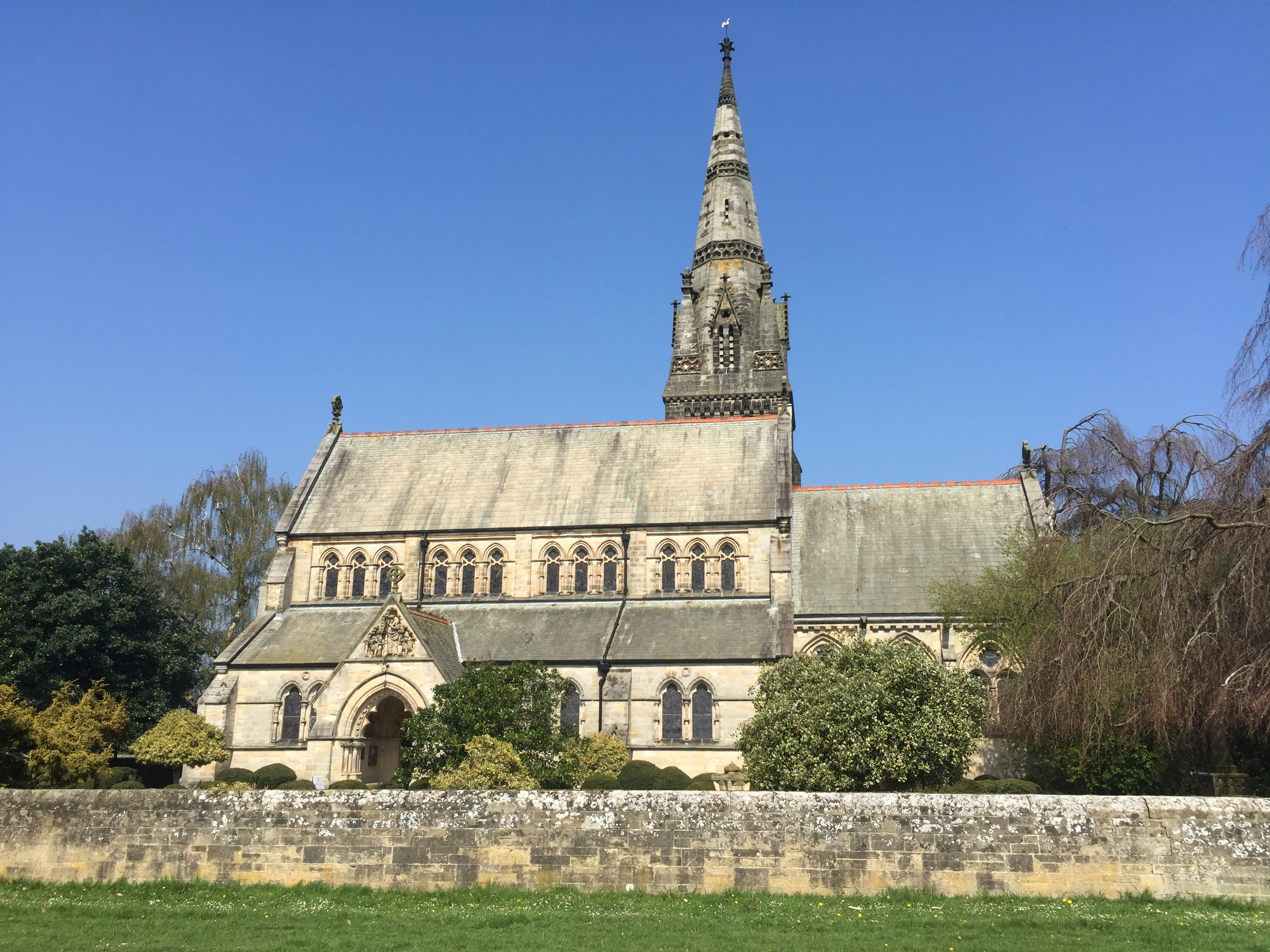
- Christ the Consoler, Skelton on Ure
- Christ the Consoler
- 54.108°N 1.449°W
- OS grid reference: SE 3599 6795
- Location: Skelton-cum-Newby, North Yorkshire
- Country: England
- Denomination: Anglican

History
- Status: In the care of the Churches Conservation Trust
- Founded: June 1870

Architecture
- Heritage designation: Listed building – Grade I
- Architect: William Burges
- Architectural type: Gothic Revival
- Style: Early English

Administration
- Parish: Newby with Mulwith

The Church of Christ the Consoler is a Victorian Gothic Revival church built in the Early English style by William Burges. It is located in the grounds of Newby Hall at Skelton-on-Ure, in North Yorkshire, England. Burges was commissioned by George Robinson, 1st Marquess of Ripon, to build it as a tribute to the Marquess' brother-in-law, Frederick Vyner. The church is a Grade I listed building as of 6 March 1967, and was vested in the Churches Conservation Trust on 14 December 1991.

== History ==
Frederick Vyner was "taken prisoner by Greek brigands in the neighbourhood of Athens April 11th 1870 and murdered by them April 21st." A significant ransom had been demanded, and in part collected, before his murder. Frederick's mother, Lady Mary Vyner determined that the unused funds would be used to construct a memorial church on her Yorkshire estate, his sister, Lady Ripon, embarking on an identical project, building St Mary's Church on her estate at Studley Royal. Burges obtained the commissions for both churches in 1870, perhaps because of the connection between his greatest patron, John Crichton-Stuart, 3rd Marquess of Bute, and Vyner, who had been friends at Oxford. The construction of the Church of Christ the Consoler began in 1871 and the church was complete by 1876.

== Architecture and description ==
The exterior is constructed of grey Catraig stone, with Morcar stone for the mouldings and is in an Early English style. The interior is faced with white limestone and exceptionally rich, with members of Burges' favourite team, Thomas Nicholls and Lonsdale, contributing. It is particularly interesting as representing an architectural move from Burges' favourite Early French style to an English inspiration. Pevsner describes it thus: "Of determined originality, the impression is one of great opulence, even if of a somewhat elephantine calibre."

In 2007, architectural historian James Stevens Curl mentioned the church among five worthwhile buildings where "it is still possible to experience something of the Victorian mastery of colour, detail, and architectural grandeur", along with the palace of Westminster, Westminster Cathedral, All Saints' Church in Margaret Street and All Saints' Church in Maidenhead.

== See also ==
- Grade I listed buildings in North Yorkshire (district)
- Listed buildings in Newby with Mulwith
- List of churches preserved by the Churches Conservation Trust in Northern England
- Spectre of Newby Church
