= St Helen's Church, Skelton-on-Ure =

Chapel in Skelton-on-Ure, North Yorkshire, England

Coordinates: 54.1095°N 1.4488°W

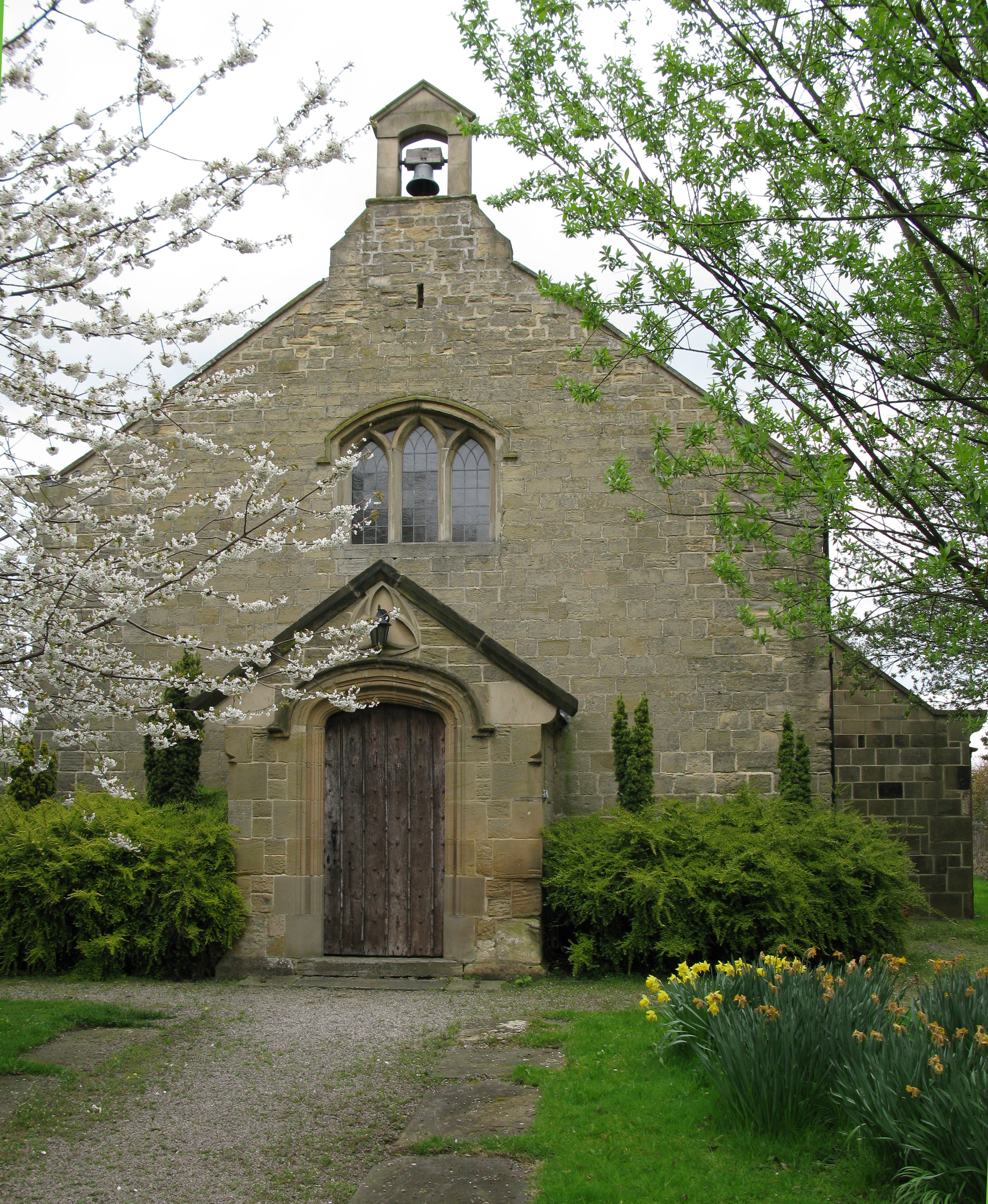
The church, in 2010

St Helen's Church is a chapel in Skelton-on-Ure, a village in North Yorkshire, in England.

There was an Anglican placed of worship in Skelton before 1750, a chapel-of-ease to what became Ripon Cathedral. In 1811, a new chapel was erected, in the Early English style. Later in the century, the building was used as a mortuary, but it returned to use for worship. The building was grade II listed in 1987.

The chapel is built of limestone, and has a grey slate roof with stone gable coping and elaborate shaped kneelers. It has a rectangular plan and two bays. At the west end is a porch with a flattened segmental moulded arch and a hood mould, and a trefoil recess above. The west and east windows each have three pointed lights in a shallow pointed arch with a hood mould. On the west gable is a bellcote. Inside, there is a plaque commemorating Elizabeth Grakelt, who died in 1828, but no historic furnishings survive.

== See also ==
- Listed buildings in Skelton-on-Ure
