= Listed buildings in Newby with Mulwith =

Newby with Mulwith is a civil parish in the county of North Yorkshire, England. It contains 27 listed buildings that are recorded in the National Heritage List for England. Of these, four are listed at Grade I, the highest of the three grades, and the others are at Grade II, the lowest grade. The most important building in the parish is the country house, Newby Hall, which is listed, and most of the other listed buildings are associated with the house or are in the gardens and grounds. Away from the hall is the Church of Christ the Consoler, which is listed together with two associated items, and the other listed building is a farmhouse.

== Key ==
Grade	Criteria
I	Buildings of exceptional interest, sometimes considered to be internationally important
II	Buildings of national importance and special interest

== Buildings ==
Name and location	Photograph	Date	Notes	Grade
Garden ornament 10 metres west of Newby Hall; 54.10160°N 1.46979°W	—	1st century (probable)	A cinerary urn later converted into a garden ornament, it is in white marble, and stands on a plinth with a moulded base and cornice, and decorated sides. The urn has a fluted and gadrooned stem, and on the sides are birds and fruit in relief, and a cartouche. On the lid is an acorn-type finial.	II
Garden ornament 30 metres west of Newby Hall; 54.10152°N 1.47102°W	—	1st century (probable)	The ornament is in white marble, and represents a tripod incense burner depicted in Roman murals. Small carved figures and paired masks stand between the legs, and the bowl is decorated with sea monsters in relief. On the top is a fluted urn.	II
Equestrian statue 54.10157°N 1.46692°W		Late 17th century	The statue, which has been moved from elsewhere, consists of figures in Carrara marble on a stone plinth. The plinth has a moulded base and cornice, and rounded ends. The statue depicts a figure mounted on a horse, with bronze reins, holding a staff, the horse standing over a cowering figure with his left hand raised to protect himself.	II
Newby Hall; 54.10161°N 1.46956°W		c. 1685–93	A country house in red brick with stone dressings, quoins, balustraded parapets, and grey slate roofs. The original building has three storeys and fronts of nine and five bays; the original central entrance has been converted into a window. The current entrance is from the east, this front has projecting wings of two storeys and seven bays. The added north dining room has two storeys and fronts of three and two bays. The main entrance has a porch with paired Ionic columns, an entablature, a cornice, and a carved blocking course. Most of the windows in the house are sashes.	I
Two lead water tanks on the terrace west of Newby Hall; 54.10162°N 1.46971°W	—	Late 16th to early 17th century	The lead water tanks are about 60 centimetres (24 in) tall and 1.2 metres (3 ft 11 in) long. The sides and ends of each tank are decorated with armorial motifs in relief.	II
Two lead urns on the terrace west of Newby Hall; 54.10168°N 1.46974°W	—	Early 18th century	Each lead urn has a fluted stem and neck, the bowl is decorated with scrolls and acanthus leaves, and it has two handles in the form of entwined snakes. The urn stands on a three-tier base.	II
Mulwith Farmhouse; 54.09509°N 1.44500°W	—	Mid-18th century	The house is rendered and has a roof of purple slate. There are two storeys, three bays, and a rear wing and outshut. On the front is a doorway, and the windows are sashes in wooden architraves.	II
Urn and pedestal in the orchard 54.09945°N 1.46760°W	—	18th century (possible)	The urn and pedestal are in stone. The pedestal has a moulded plinth and cornice, and fielded panels. The urn, which dates from the early to mid-19th century, has concave sides with a leaf motif in relief, and a lid with stylised acanthus leaves and a fluted finial.	II
Skelton Lodges, gates and screen walls 54.10587°N 1.44705°W		c. 1777	At the eastern entrance to the grounds of Newby Hall is a long symmetrical range of buildings. In the centre are double wrought iron gates flanked by inner stone piers, outside which are railings, outer piers and ramped walls. These lead to two-storey square lodges with one bay and grey slate roofs, then screen walls containing gateways, leading to single-storey three-bay lodges. Outside these are screen walls with gateways ramped up to massive end piers.	I
Stables north of Newby Hall; 54.10263°N 1.46943°W		c. 1777	The stable range is in brick, faced in stone on two sides, with rusticated quoins, stone dressings and hipped grey slate roofs. They form a quadrangular plan, with ranges of seven and nine bays. The eastern front has a central pedimented bay containing a round arch with a rusticated surround, and a triple keystone, flanked by round-headed niches, above which is a plaque and an oculus. The flanking bays have round-arched recesses with keystones and Diocletian windows above. On the roof is an octagonal cupola with a dome and an elaborate weathervane.	I
Water trough in stable yard 54.10262°N 1.46971°W	—	c. 1777	The water trough is in stone, and is about 1 metre (3 ft 3 in) tall and 2 metres (6 ft 7 in) square. It has concave fluted sides and a rolled-back rim, and on the west side is a step and a recess.	II
Former orangery and gateway 54.10318°N 1.47024°W	—	1790	The former orangery, which was mainly designed by William Weddell, is in rendered brick on a moulded plinth, with dressings in stone and terracotta, and a hipped grey slate roof. There is a single storey and a front of seven bays, the middle three bays canted and containing a doorway with a fanlight and a hood mould. The windows are sashes in architraves with hood moulds, and between the bays are decorated pilasters with capitals. Above is a frieze, a moulded eaves cornice and a blocking course. The gateway to the right has a segmental arch, and the wall above it is ramped and contains a central opening, and the gate has a scroll motif.	II
Four urns and pedestals south of Newby Hall; 54.10100°N 1.46962°W	—	Mid-19th century (probable)	At each corner of The Vista is an urn on a pedestal in stone. Each pedestal stands on a deep stepped plinth, and has square fielded panels and a deep cornice. The urns have gadrooning on the base of the bowl, and each has a turned-back top edge with fruit and flowers in relief.	II
Urn and pedestal to north of west end of Statue Walk; 54.10085°N 1.47096°W	—	Mid-19th century	The urn and pedestal are in stone. The pedestal has fielded panels, and a deep plinth and cornice, and the urn is heavily moulded, its bowl is decorated in deep relief with classical motifs and swags.	II
Urn and pedestal to south of west end of Statue Walk; 54.10056°N 1.47093°W	—	Mid-19th century (probable)	The urn and pedestal are in stone, with a surface coating of sand. The pedestal has a moulded plinth and cornice, and fielded panels. The urn has a turned-back rim and grotesque masks in deep relief.	II
Wheelhouse to west of the west garden wall 54.09902°N 1.46764°W	—	Mid-19th century	The wheelhouse has brick walls, it contains mechanism in timber and cast iron, and has a hipped Welsh slate roof. The roof is carried on seven piers, the eighth side being part of a former pumping house.	II
Bench at west end of Statue Walk; 54.10070°N 1.47129°W		Mid to late 19th century	The bench is in stone, and has a curved plan. The seat is plain, and at the back is a low wall with piers at the ends. In the centre is a panel with three pilasters and recessed panels containing carved fruit and flowers. This is flanked by decorative brackets carrying an entablature with a segmental pediment on a cornice, containing a circular plaque with a carved head, and flanked by foliate scrolls.	II
Memorial of the Nidd Ferry Disaster; 54.10011°N 1.46980°W		c. 1869	The memorial, which has been moved from its original site, commemorates those lost in the accident. It is in gritstone, and about 3 metres (9.8 ft) tall. It has a square base, and a round-arched recess on each side. Above are clustered Corinthian columns, some with grape decoration. Around the columns are four mushroom-shaped finials, and on the top are ball and cushion finials.	II
Gate piers and gates east of Newby Hall; 54.10166°N 1.46840°W	—	c. 1870	The gates and gate piers were designed by William Burges. The four gate piers are in grey gritstone, and are about 4 metres (13 ft) tall. Each pier has a moulded base, recessed panels with reliefs of animals, tools and trophies, a garlanded frieze and a deep cornice to the entablature. It is surmounted by an embossed vase with an ornate lid and a bud finial. The inner and outer gates are in wrought iron, and have bars and dogbars, a lock rail and scrolled overthrows.	II
Statue Walk; 54.10075°N 1.47011°W	—	c. 1870	The walk is straight and about 150 metres (490 ft) long, sloping from east to west. It contains three flights of steps, and on the south side are six limestone statues facing the house. The walkway forms a terrace, and has two flights of steps going down from it. Each flight is flanked by balustrades of bulbous balusters, containing piers with urns or ball finials.	II
Church of Christ the Consoler and Eleanor Cross; 54.10617°N 1.45106°W		1871–76	The church, designed by William Burges, is in stone with a grey slate roof. It consists of a nave with a clerestory, north and south aisles, a south porch, a chancel, and a partly embraced north steeple. The steeple has a tower with four stages, angle buttresses, paired bell openings with a corbel table above, and a decorated spire with corner pinnacles and two bands. The west window is a large rose window with four sculptures, and the east window has five pointed lights and a central rose. The porch has a moulded doorway with a hood mould, above which is a carving in a niche. Linked to the east end is a memorial in the form of an Eleanor Cross.	I
Wall, gates and gate piers, Church of Christ the Consoler; 54.10592°N 1.45080°W		1874	The walls enclosing the churchyard, the gates and the gate piers were designed by William Burges. The walls are in gritstone with chamfered coping, and are about 1.2 metres (3 ft 11 in) high. There are gateways in the west and south sides. The gate piers are about 1.5 metres (4 ft 11 in) tall, with caps in the form of a truncated pyramid with embattled edges. The gates are wooden with iron fittings, and have panels infilled with diagonal boards.	II
Church Cottage; 54.10646°N 1.44930°W		c. 1874	The house is in grey gritstone, with raked stone eaves and a grey slate roof. There is one storey and attics, and an L-shaped plan, with a front of two bays. The left bay is recessed under a verandah, and contains a window and a doorway. The right bay projects and is gabled, it contains windows, above which is a chamfered band and a narrow lancet window. On the left return is a bay window with a hipped roof.	II
Balustrade, two sets of steps and stone bench south of Newby Hall; 54.10135°N 1.46950°W	—	c. 1875	The stone balustrade to the south of the house extends to the south to enclose the pond. The balusters are bulbous, and the piers have urns and ball finials. At the west end is a curved bench, and on its back is a central urn and ball finials.	II
Well in churchyard, Church of Christ the Consoler; 54.10611°N 1.45074°W		c. 1875	The well is enclosed by a wall with roll moulding, there is an outlet on the west side and a wooden cover. Over this is an iron canopy with three supports carrying a corona decorated with ivy leaves, supporting three trefoil decorated ties to a cross finial. In the centre is a rod with a pulley wheel.	II
Urn and pedestal to north of east end of Statue Walk; 54.10098°N 1.46859°W	—	Late 19th century	The urn and pedestal are in stone, and about 2 metres (6 ft 7 in) tall. The pedestal is square and cushioned out at the base. The urn has a fluted stem and is carved in relief with acanthus-style motifs and swags. The lid has similar decoration and a bud finial.	II
