= William Weddell =

English landowner and politician (1736–1792)

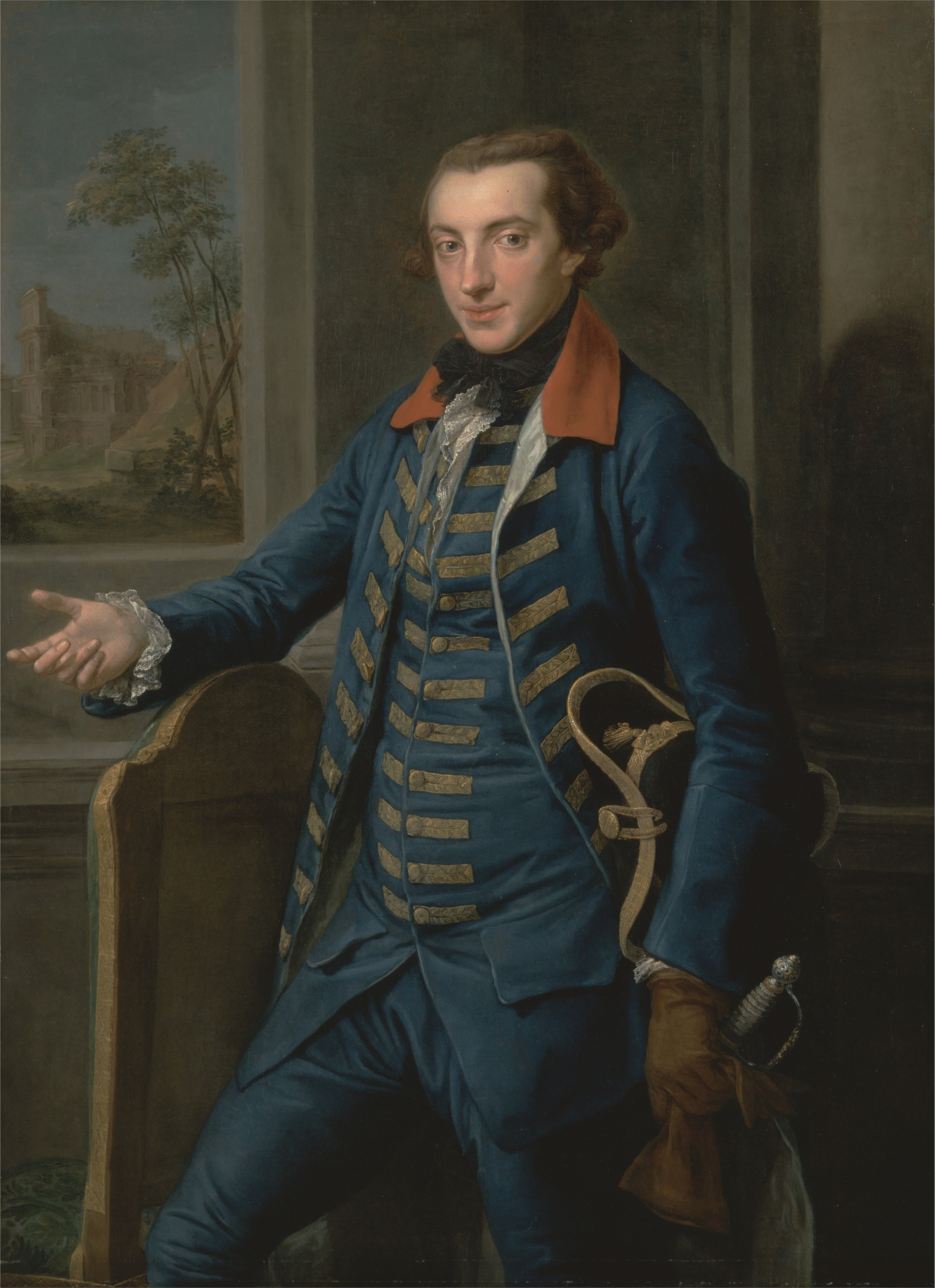
William Weddell, portrait by Pompeo Batoni, frequented by many young Englishmen on the Grand Tour

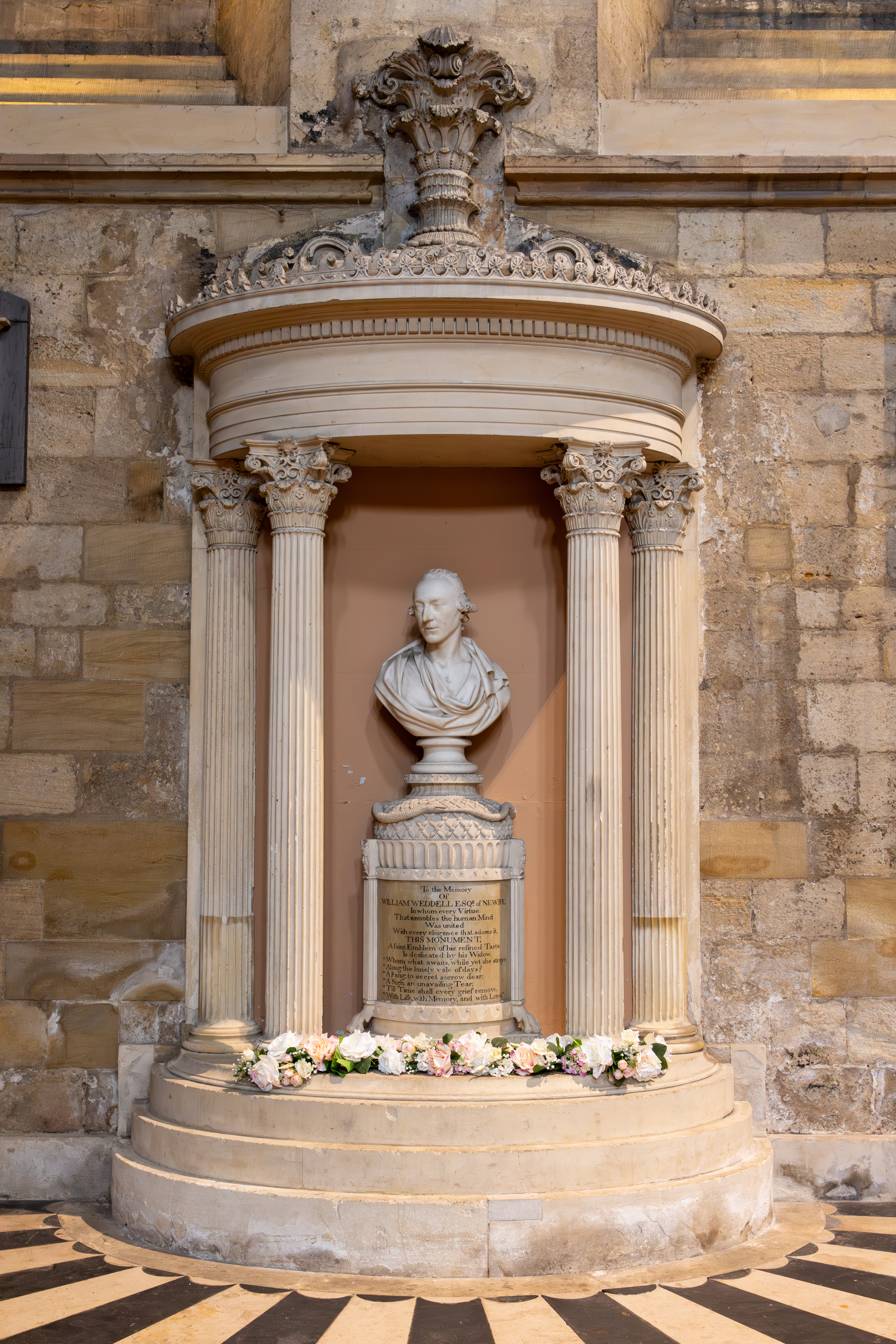
Monument to William Weddell, Ripon Cathedral

William Weddell (13 May 1736 – 30 April 1792) of Newby Hall in the parish of Skelton-on-Ure, near Ripon in the West Riding of Yorkshire, was a British landowner and politician who sat in the House of Commons between 1766 and 1792. He created a notable collection of antiquities including the Barberini Venus.

== Origins ==
He was born on 13 May 1736 as "William Elcock", the son and heir of Richard Elcock (d.1762) (who later adopted the surname of Weddell in lieu of his patronymic), later of Newby Hall, which he purchased in 1748. His great-uncle was Thomas Weddell of Earswick, Paymaster to the Navy, who made a large fortune during the South Sea Bubble.

== Career ==
He was educated at Dr. Newcome's Academy in Hackney, and later at St. John’s College, Cambridge (1753), at the expense of his great-uncle Thomas Weddell, who bequeathed his fortune to Richard Elcock on condition that he and William should change their surnames to Weddell. He trained as a lawyer at Gray's Inn in 1753. In 1762 whilst on the Grand Tour, William Weddell became heir to his father, his elder brother having died. William was thus in a position to start what became a renowned collection of classical antiquities, including the Barberini Venus, which sold in 2002 for £8 million. He upgraded and extended Newby Hall to house his collection.

He was elected a Member of Parliament for Kingston upon Hull in 1766, sitting until 1774. He was elected for Malton in 1775, serving until 1784, and again in 1784, serving until 1792.

== Marriage ==
He married Elizabeth Ramsden, a daughter of Sir John Ramsden, 3rd Baronet and a half-sister of Lady Rockingham, by whom he had no surviving children.

== Death and burial ==
He died on 30 April 1792 and was buried in Ripon Minster (now Ripon Cathedral) where survives his unusual monument consisting of a representation of a Greek temple containing his bust by Joseph Nollekens.

== Succession ==
He had no surviving children and left Newby Hall to his distant cousin Thomas Robinson, 2nd Earl de Grey (1781-1859), then 3rd Baron Grantham, who in 1803 in accordance with the bequest changed his name to Weddell, but in accordance with a further bequest from his maternal aunt changed it again in 1833 to Grey.

Parliament of Great Britain
Preceded by Lord Robert Manners; Sir George Montgomery Metham	Member of Parliament for Kingston upon Hull; 1766–1774; With: Lord Robert Manners	Succeeded by Lord Robert Manners; David Hartley
Preceded by Savile Finch; Edmund Burke	Member of Parliament for Malton; 1775–1784; With: Savile Finch 1775-1780; Edmund Burke 1780-1784	Succeeded by Edmund Burke; Sir Thomas Gascoigne
Preceded by Edmund Burke; Sir Thomas Gascoigne	Member of Parliament for Malton; 1784– 1792; With: Edmund Burke	Succeeded by Edmund Burke; Hon. George Damer
