= Skelton Windmill =

Windmill in Skelton-on-Ure, North Yorkshire, England

Coordinates: 54°07′11″N 1°25′36″W

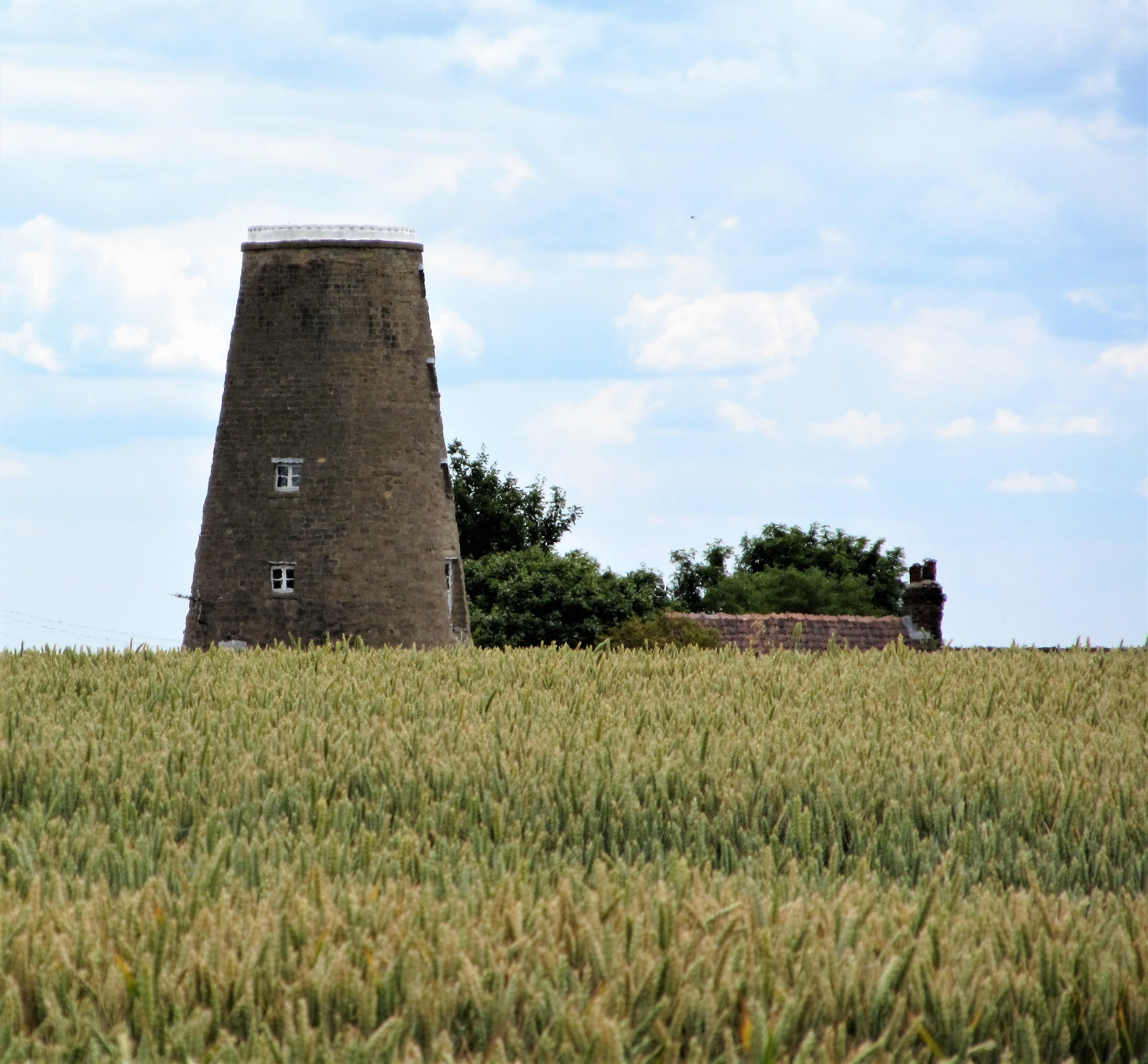
The building, in 2018

Skelton Windmill, also known as Kirby Mill, is a historic building in Skelton-on-Ure, a village in North Yorkshire, in England.

The windmill was constructed in 1822, to grind corn. The windows and door were replaced in the 20th century. After the mill closed, the cap and sails were removed, and its roof was used as a viewing platform, with railings placed around it. The building was grade II listed in 1987. It was later converted into a house, with the ground floor extended to provide additional living space.

The tower is built of limestone, it is tapering, and has seven storeys. A flight of steps leads up to a doorway with a dated lintel. Elsewhere there are tiers of windows, a blocked doorway, a loading door and socket holes. At the top are wrought iron railings on a projecting band. Inside, there is a dining room on the ground floor, a kitchen and breakfast room on the first floor, main bedroom on the second floor, library and sitting room on the third floor, and further bedrooms on the upper floors.

== See also ==
- Listed buildings in Skelton-on-Ure
