= 113th Regiment of Foot (Royal Highlanders) =

- Active: 1761–1763
- Disbanded: 1763 (Due to the war ending)
- Country: United Kingdom
- Branch: British Army
- Type: Infantry
- Nickname: Royal Highlanders

Commanders
- Notable commanders: James Inglis Hamilton

The 113th Regiment of Foot, known as the Royal Highlanders, was authorized on 17 October 1761, and raised in Great Britain for service of the British Army under the command of James Inglis Hamilton. The regiment served as a depot for sending drafts to Highland regiments serving overseas. It was disbanded in 1763.
