= James Inglis Hamilton =

British Army officer (1728–1803)

General James Inglis Hamilton
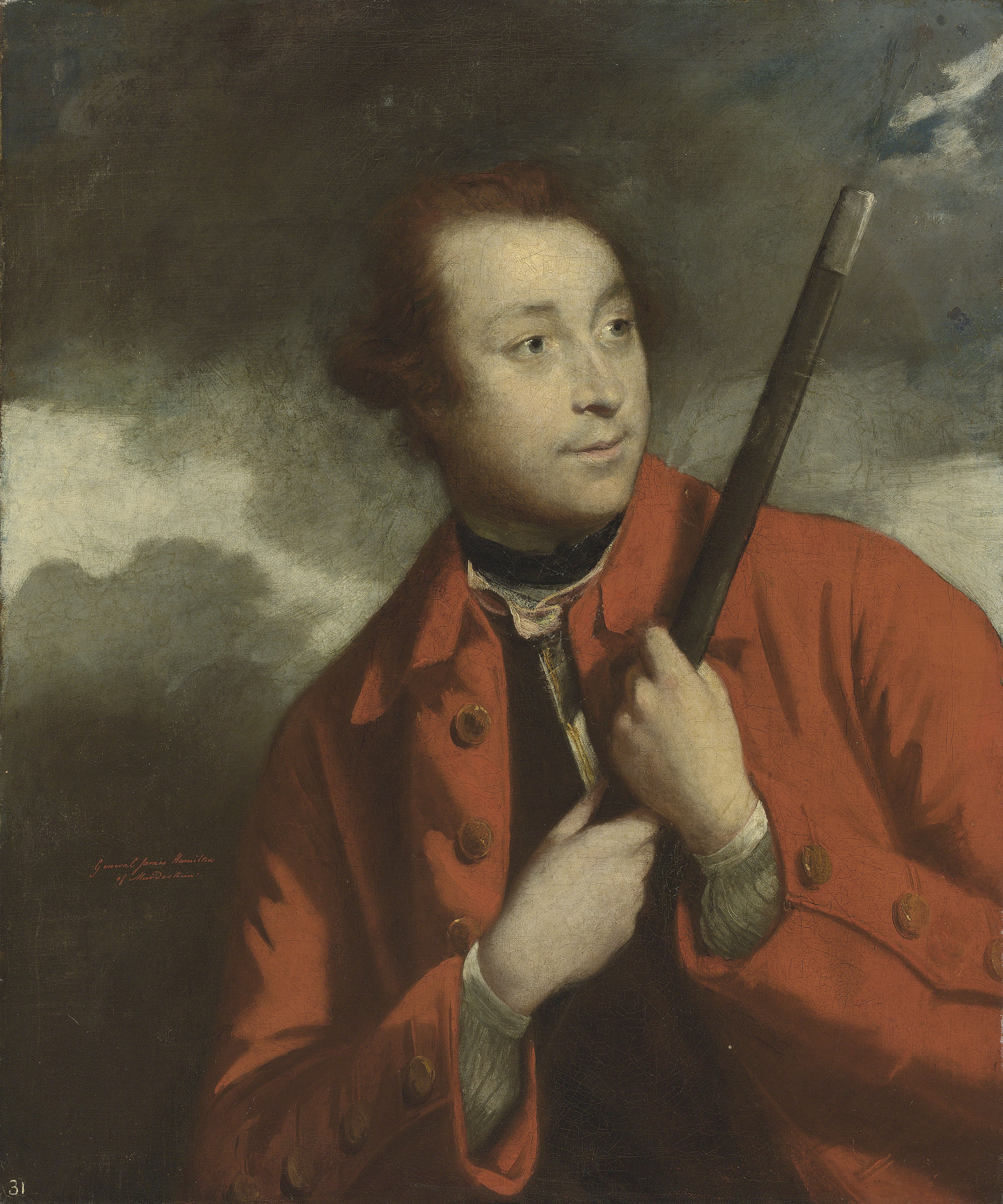
- Portrait by Sir Joshua Reynolds, c. 1756–1760
- Born: 1728
- Died: 27 July 1803 (aged 74–75); Murdostoun, Lanarkshire
- Burial place: Murdostoun plot in Kirk O' Shotts graveyard 55°50′45″N 3°51′0″W
- Relatives: Gavin Hamilton (brother); James Hamilton (son)
- Military career
- Allegiance: Great Britain; United Kingdom
- Branch: British Army
- Service years: 1755–1803
- Rank: General
- Units: 34th Regiment of Foot
- Commands: 113th Regiment of Foot (Royal Highlanders); 15th (The Yorkshire East Riding) Regiment of Foot
- Conflicts: Seven Years' War; Siege of Fort St Philip (1756) (POW); Raid on St Malo; Capture of Belle Île; American War of Independence; Invasion of Quebec (1775); Saratoga campaign; Battle of Freeman's Farm (POW); French Revolutionary Wars; Battle of Martinique (1794); Invasion of Guadeloupe (1794)

General James Inglis Hamilton (1728 – 27 July 1803) was a British Army officer who served in the Seven Years' War, American War of Independence and French Revolutionary Wars. He joined the Army in 1755 and went on to command several regiments. Hamilton was the only colonel of the 113th Regiment of Foot (Royal Highlanders). During the Seven Years' War, Hamilton fought in the siege of Fort St Philip, raid on St Malo and the capture of Belle Île.

During the American War of Independence, Hamilton participated in repelling the American invasion of Quebec in 1775 and commanding a British column at the Battle of Freeman's Farm in 1777, where he was captured. Made a member of the Convention Army, Hamilton was imprisoned in Cambridge, Massachusetts. While an American prisoner of war, he adopted James Hamilton, the son of a non-commissioned officer in the British Army. Hamilton was eventually released in 1783.

Following his brother's death, Hamilton took over Murdostoun, where he renovated the castle extensively. Commanding the 15th (The Yorkshire East Riding) Regiment of Foot, Hamilton participated in capture of Martinique as well as the invasion of Guadeloupe in the French Revolutionary Wars. He died on 27 July 1803 at Murdostoun and is buried at Kirk of Shotts graveyard. His adopted son took over Murdostoun before dying at the Battle of Waterloo in 1815.

== Early life ==
Very little is known of Hamilton's early life. He was the third son of Alexander (died 1768) and Margaret Hamilton (died 1742). His two older brothers were Alexander (died 1783) and Gavin Hamilton (1723–1798), the latter a painter and archeologist in Rome. Inglis was added to the family name in 1719 as a condition of the will by which Alexander Inglis bequeathed Murdostoun to his nephew Alexander Hamilton, James's father.

== Seven Years' War ==
Hamilton was commissioned into the British Army on 28 February 1755 and was stationed at Portsmouth. He first saw action in June 1756 at the siege of Fort St Philip in Minorca during the Seven Years' War. Assigned to the 34th Regiment of Foot, he was one of the 2,860 British troops under the command of William Blakeney besieged by 15,000 French troops under the Duke of Richelieu and Roland-Michel Barrin de La Galissonière. The French sailed to Fort St. Philip and forced Blakeney to capitulate after a siege. During the siege, Admiral of the Blue John Byng sailed for Minorca with a fleet to relieve the garrison, but was defeated at the Battle of Minorca. The British garrison suffered 59 killed, with the remainder, 149 of whom were wounded, becoming French prisoners of war.

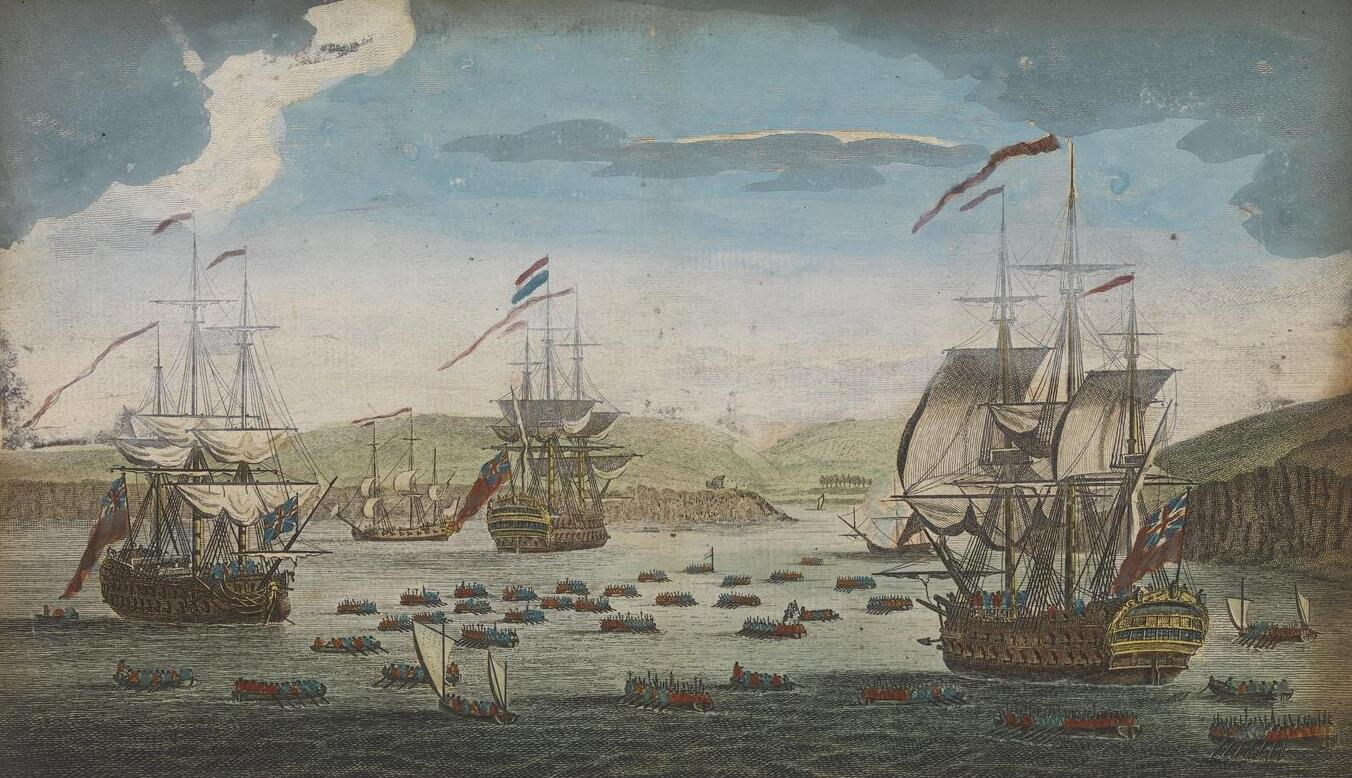
The British capture of Belle Île in 1761, which Hamilton participated in

Hamilton was eventually released and fought in the British raid on St Malo in June 1758. The British landed near Saint-Malo, at first planning to attack the town. However, they decided to destroy shipping first and attack the town later. Finding that to occupy the town would require a full siege, for which they had insufficient troops, they occupied Saint-Servan, where they burned over 100 merchant and 30 privateers. British ships retreated after seeing a large French force, but sailed around the coast for a few weeks seeking another place to attack. Even though the Raid on Saint-Malo was small and little damage was done, it is considered a British victory.

In 1761, Hamilton took part in the British capture of Belle Île as one of the 5,000 troops led by Studholme Hodgson. The first British attack was unsuccessful and led to the attackers suffering approximately 500 killed or wounded. With reinforcements, a second attempt succeeded on 7 June. On 17 October, while holding the rank of major, Hamilton became major commandant (colonel) of the 113th Regiment of Foot (Royal Highlanders). It was formed from independent companies and served as a depot for sending drafts to Highland regiments serving overseas. The regiment disbanded in 1763, and Hamilton retired on half-pay. He became a lieutenant colonel on 25 May 1772.

== American War of Independence ==
In 1774, Hamilton commanded the 21st Regiment of Foot in the American War of Independence; General John Burgoyne said that he "was the whole time engaged and acquitted himself with great honor, activity, and good conduct." Early in 1776, while in the 21st Regiment, Hamilton accompanied General Guy Carleton in the British response to the Continental Army's 1775 invasion of Quebec. On 15 September 1776 he was appointed temporary commander of the 1st Brigade when Brigadier General Nesbit fell ill. Upon Nesbit's death, Hamilton was promoted to brigadier. He was assigned to the 2nd Brigade, which consisted of the 34th, 53rd, 62nd, and 20th Regiments of Foot. It was originally intended to include Hamilton's 21st Regiment of Foot in the brigade, but it was replaced by the 53rd.

=== Saratoga campaign ===
Hamilton helped General Burgoyne organize troops for his campaign to divide the rebellious provinces. He was assigned to the 1st Brigade, comprising the 9th, 47th, and 53rd Regiments of Foot. Later, when Henry Watson Powell transported the 62nd Regiment to Fort Ticonderoga, the 1st and 2nd Brigades were amalgamated.

On 19 September 1777, in Stillwater, New York, Hamilton commanded 1,100 men of the centre column, consisting of the 9th, 20th, 21st, and 62nd Regiments of Foot, which attacked the heights at the Battle of Freeman's Farm. His column was arrayed with the 21st on the right, the 20th on the left, the 62nd in the middle, and the 9th in reserve. To his left, Friedrich Adolf Riedesel commanded the 47th Regiment of Foot and some German troops. To Hamilton's right, Simon Fraser commanded the 24th Regiment of Foot along with light infantry and grenadiers. Even though Hamilton was considered the commander, Burgoyne led the attack.

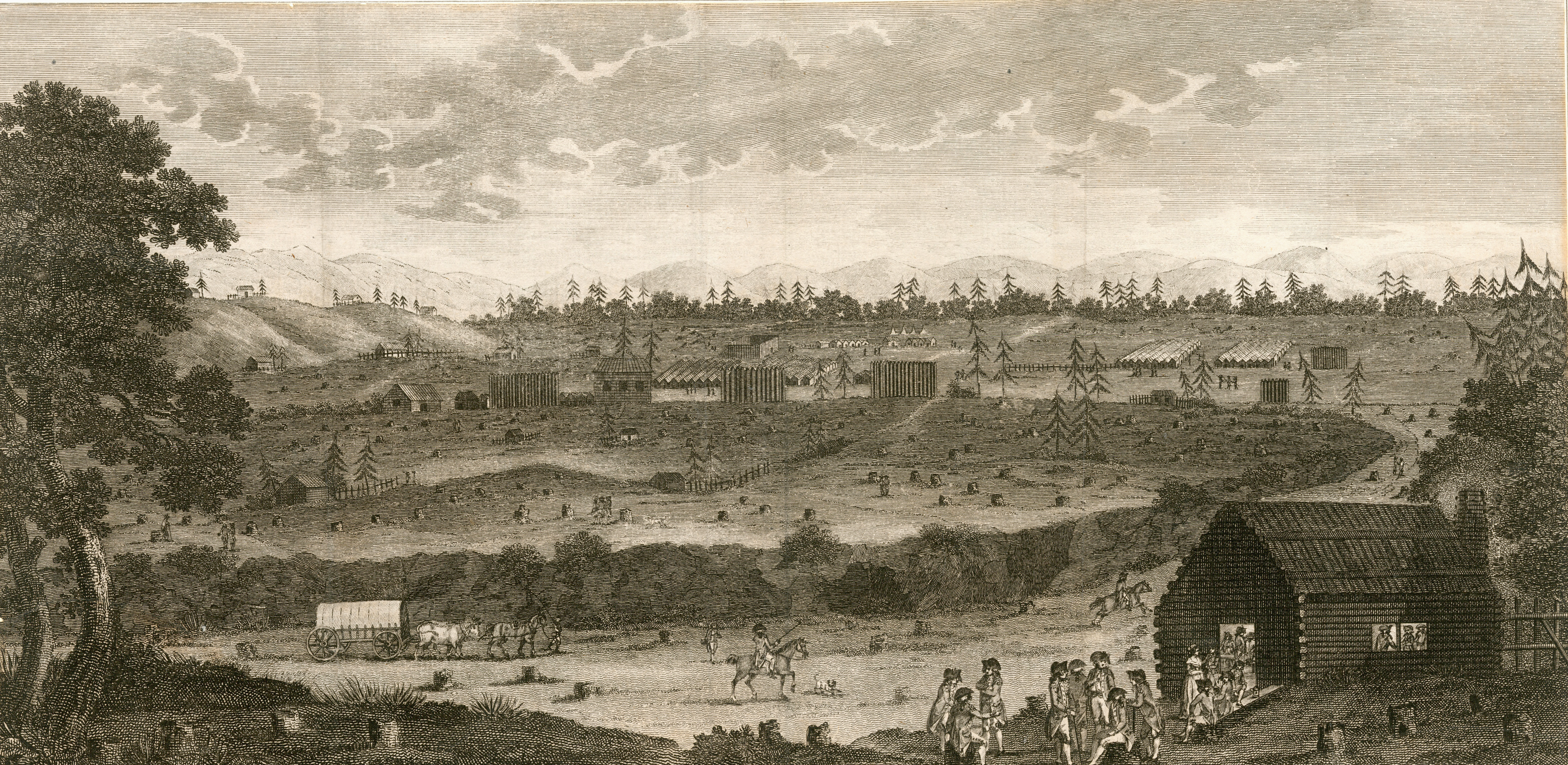
The Convention Army, of which Hamilton was a part of, encamped at Charlotteville, Virginia

The centre column migrated toward the southwest to meet up with the right column. During the battle, Colonel Daniel Morgan of the United States led a charge, but Hamilton's men turned it back and the British won the battle. Burgoyne had gained the field of battle, but suffered nearly 600 casualties, mostly in Hamilton's centre column, where the 62nd was reduced to the size of a single company and three-quarters of the artillery men were killed or wounded. American losses were nearly 300 killed and seriously wounded.

In the next battle, the Battle of Bemis Heights, Hamilton was not as engaged as he was at Freeman's Farm. He was the guard of the camp near the heights. He was in the Convention Army that surrendered after the battle, among about 5,900 troops that surrendered at Saratoga. The prisoners arrived at Cambridge, Massachusetts on 8 November 1777. William Phillips commanded the Convention Army until he was exchanged for American General Benjamin Lincoln in 1780; then Hamilton became the commander. While a prisoner of war, Hamilton adopted a boy named Jamie Anderson (1777–1815), the son of Sergeant Major William Anderson of the 21st Foot. Hamilton name was "signed to the parole given by the officers ... in December". The Convention Army had to move to Charlottesville, Virginia and arrived around January 1779. Hamilton was released on 3 September 1781, subject to the condition that he could not travel to America until the war was over.

== Later life ==
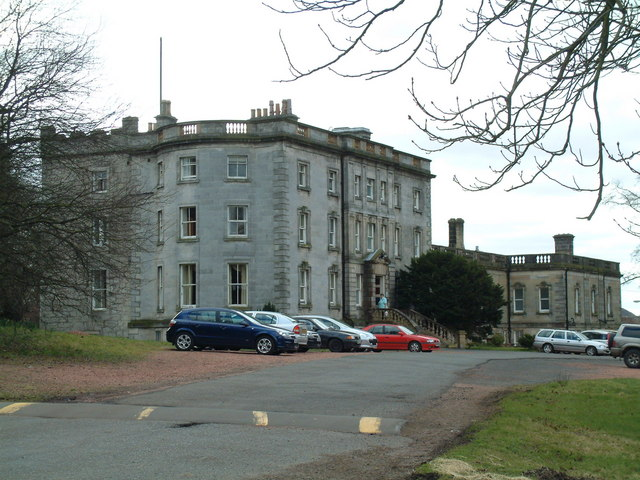
Murdostoun Castle (2006). Hamilton made modifications to it, and it is where he died.

After his exchange, Hamilton returned to Britain, where he funded his adopted son's education at Glasgow University. Because of his high rank, Hamilton was able to obtain a commission for his son, who became a cornet in 1792. The boy changed his name to James Hamilton when he enlisted in the British Army.

Around 1790, Hamilton made various renovations to Murdostoun: filling the turret staircase and the old dungeons, adding a parapet running round the roof-line, and changing the original courtyard. On his brother Galvin's death in 1798, Hamilton took over Murdostoun. He came to be considered as one of the most influential freeholders in Lanarkshire.

Hamilton was the colonel of the 15th Regiment of Foot from 22 August 1792 to 1794, during which he took part in the 1790s West Indies Campaign. The 15th Foot was awarded the battle honour Martinique 1794 (5 February – 25 March). During the battle, the 15th Foot was a part of the First Brigade, which consisted of the 39th and 43rd Regiment of Foot and was led by Sir C. Gordon.

The regiment also saw service at Guadeloupe (12 April) the same year. He was colonel of his old regiment, the 21st Foot, from 1794 to 1803. While with them he was promoted to lieutenant-general on 26 January 1797 and to full general on 29 April 1802. Hamilton died on his estate in Scotland on 27 July 1803. On 18 August 1803, his son, who was his only heir, took over Murdostoun. James was killed while commanding the Royal Scots Greys at the Battle of Waterloo.

== See also ==
- List of British generals

Military offices
New regiment	Colonel of the 113th Regiment of Foot; 17 October 1761 – 1763	Disbanded
Preceded by Sir William Fawcett	Colonel of the 15th Regiment of Foot; 22 August 1792 – 20 June 1794	Succeeded by Henry Watson Powell
Preceded by Hon. James Murray	Colonel of the 21st Regiment of Foot; 20 June 1794 – 27 July 1803	Succeeded by Hon. William Gordon
