= Bonkle =

Coordinates: 55.79°N 3.86°W

Bonkle: Scottish Gaelic: Bun Choille
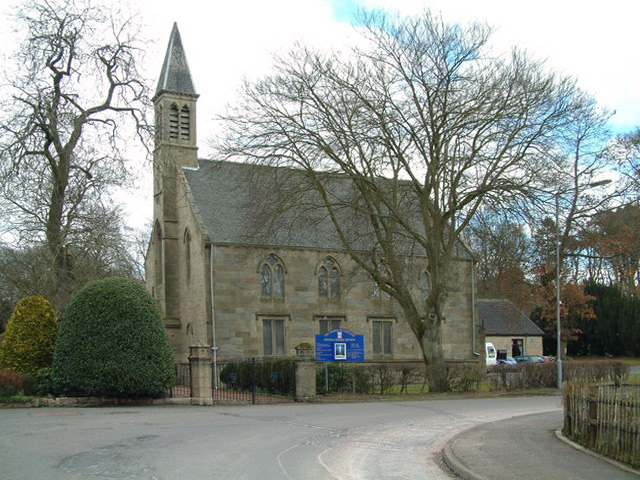
- Bonkle Church, rebuilt in 1878

- Location within North Lanarkshire
- Council area: North Lanarkshire
- Lieutenancy area: Lanarkshire
- Country: Scotland
- Sovereign state: United Kingdom
- Post town: WISHAW
- Postcode district: ML2
- Dialling code: 01698
- Police: Scotland
- Fire: Scottish
- Ambulance: Scottish
- UK Parliament: Motherwell and Wishaw
- Scottish Parliament: Airdrie and Shotts

Bonkle is a village 3 miles (4.8 km) north-east of Wishaw in North Lanarkshire, Scotland. It is sited on the east bank of the South Calder Water. Murdostoun Castle is located nearby.

== See also ==
- Murdostoun
- South Calder Water
- North Lanarkshire
- Scotland
