= Listed buildings in Skelton-on-Ure =

Skelton-on-Ure is a civil parish in the county of North Yorkshire, England. It contains four listed buildings that are recorded in the National Heritage List for England. All the listed buildings are designated at Grade II, the lowest of the three grades, which is applied to "buildings of national importance and special interest". The parish contains the village of Skelton-on-Ure and the surrounding countryside, and the listed buildings consist of a barn, a windmill, a chapel and a house.

== Buildings ==
Name and location	Photograph	Date	Notes
Barn at Village Farm; 54.10872°N 1.44903°W		Mid to late 18th century	The barn is in cobble and limestone, with quoins and a pantile roof. There are eight bays, and on the road front are two segmental-arched wagon entrances with quoined surrounds The right return contains an inserted stable door and a window, and all fronts have slit vents.
Skelton Windmill; 54.11965°N 1.42666°W		1822	The tower of the windmill remains, and the sails are missing. The tower is in limestone, it is tapering, and has seven storeys. A flight of steps leads up to a doorway with a dated lintel. Elsewhere there are tiers of windows, a blocked doorway, a loading door and socket holes. At the top are wrought iron railings on a projecting band.
St Helen's Chapel; 54.10953°N 1.44881°W		Early 19th century	The chapel is in limestone, and has a grey slate roof with stone gable coping and elaborate shaped kneelers. It has a rectangular plan and two bays. At the west end is a porch with a flattened segmental moulded arch and a hood mould, and a trefoil recess above. The west and east windows each have three pointed lights in a shallow pointed arch with a hood mould. On the west gable is a bellcote.
Manor Farmhouse; 54.11098°N 1.44879°W	—	Mid 19th century	The house is in red brick and has a grey slate roof with gable copings, and kneelers, shaped on the left and cut back on the right. There are two storeys and an attic, and three bays. The central doorway has a fanlight, paterae and a cornice, and the windows are sashes in architraves. On the left return is a loading door.
