= Murdostoun =

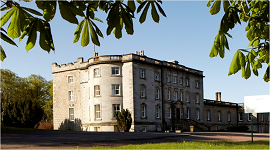
Murdostoun Castle in 2015

Murdostoun is an estate in North Lanarkshire, Scotland, which includes a castle, which lies on the South Calder Water near the village of Bonkle in the parish of Shotts, North Lanarkshire, Scotland. The name Murdostoun was derived from the words Murthock and Toun which meant dwelling of Murthock. Murdostoun can refer to the ancient barony of the Scott and then the Inglis clan, the castle built by the Scotts or a bridge over the South Calder Water.

== Estate ==
The Murdostoun Estate contained many farms. The main ones were: Foulburn, Castlehill, Easthouse, Westhouse, Penty, Muimailing, Easterhill, Westerhill and Shapenknowe. Other near the Murdostoun Castle were Eastwood, Westwood, Rosebank and Heughbank. The estate was reported to consist of 1,760 acres (710 hectares) in 1872.

== Murdostoun Castle ==
Murdostoun Castle lies 1100 metres west-northwest of the village of Bonkle. 55°47′41″N 3°52′31″W
Murdostoun Castle was built by the Scott family in the 15th century and was constructed as a keep or fortified residence. It stands on a good position high above the South Calder Water and was one of many built as a defensive measure across the Forth and Clyde Valley. The typical design of these houses was of a tall square block of three storeys, set within a courtyard, with thick walls and battlements. For security, no access from the ground floor to the two floors above, could be made. The main hall on the first floor was reached by a removable staircase from the Courtyard and access to the top floor, where the sleeping quarters were located, was by a narrow stair within the walls. Other rooms were also created within the walls. The roofs were made of stone for protection against fire attacks and parapets and fighting platforms were provided around the wall tops.

== Murdostoun Bridge ==
Murdostoun Bridge, dated to 1817, is a single-span segmental-arch bridge constructed predominantly of yellow ashlar sandstone, with chamfered-wing walls, hood moulded arch ring and low ashlar parapets.

Murdostoun Bridge crosses the South Calder Water which divided the Murdostoun Estate from the Allanton estate. The river is also the parish boundary. Equidistant between the Allanton estate village of Bonkle and Murdostoun Castle. The bridge was probably built by the Stewarts of Allanton, stylistically it is similar to the triple span Allanton House bridge. The date of 1817 matches many of the cottages in Bonkle, the Allanton estate village whereas the Murdostoun estate was unoccupied at this time.

== History ==
The Barony of Murdostoun once included the lands of Hartwood and extended east as far as Hilhouserig and Hartwood Burn.

The Family Murthock can be traced back as far as the reign of Alexander III of Scotland. In 1296 Sir Richard Scott married the daughter and heiress of Murdostoun and became the owner of the properties of Murdostoun and Hardwood, and as feudal lord swore fealty to Edward I of England. Sir Richard died in 1320. His descendant, Sir David Scott, sat in the Parliament held in Edinburgh in 1487 as 'Dominus de Baccleuch.' His son, Sir Michael Scott, heir of Murdostoun, was slain at the Battle of Durham, 17 October 1346. He was succeeded by his elder son Robert, who died in 1389, who in turn was succeeded by his son Walter Scott of Murdostoun and Rankelburn. On 7 December 1389, he obtained a charter from Robert II of the superiority of Kirkurd, and was honoured by a knighthood. On 23 July 1446 by a charter of Excambion the Scotts' lands of Murdostoun and Hartwood were exchanged with Thomas Inglis for his half of the Barony of Branxholm in Roxburghshire.

The Scotts settled at Branxholm, which forms part of the Buccleuch estates to this day; while Thomas Inglis removed to Lanarkshire. On his death, Murdostoun went to his eldest son, Thomas, and his heirs, who also held for a time the superiority of Manor. The property of Manor went to John, the second son, but in time it became restricted to Manorhead, a farm at the top of the glen, which remained in the younger branch of the family till 1709, when it was sold. The Inglis family remained in residence at Murdostoun for the next 300 years. The old stock of Inglises ended with Thomas Inglis of Murdostoun, who succeeded in about 1696, and sold the estate to Alexander Inglis, merchant in Edinburgh, the second son of David Inglis of Fingask, and a descendant of the Inglises of Inglistarvit, Fife. The death of Alexander Inglis in 1719 signalled the end of the connection of this part of the Inglis family with the Barony of Murdostoun. Alexander Inglis, having no heirs, bequeathed the Estate to his nephew Alexander Hamilton, with the proviso that he took the Inglis name.

Alexander Inglis Hamilton's three sons succeeded in turn. The eldest, Alexander Inglis Hamilton, died on 27 April 1783; the second, Gavin Hamilton, was a historical painter and archaeologist at Rome; the youngest, Major-General James Inglis Hamilton, distinguished himself in the American Revolutionary War, and died on 27 July 1803. He adopted, James Anderson, the son of a sergeant major in Saratoga, New York. He re-entailed Murdostoun on his adopted son, James Anderson, who took the surname Inglis-Hamilton. Colonel James Inglis Hamilton, Laird of Murdostoun, died at the Battle of Waterloo in 1815.

Murdostoun Castle was acquired by Robert Stewart (b. 1811), son of Robert Stewart and Mary Herbert of Stair, East Ayrshire, in 1850 from Lord Lamington for £55,000. Robert Stewart died on 12 September 1866 and was succeeded as Laird of the Murdostoun estate by his elder son, Sir Robert King Stewart. The estate was reported to contain 1,760 acres (710 hectares) in 1873. Murdostoun was the first house in Scotland to receive electric lighting in September 1882. The electricity was generated by a steam-powered generator. They acquired a motor car in 1908 and the telephone was installed in 1910.

Sir Robert King Stewart died in December 1930 at the age of 78. Lady Alice then removed to Cleghorn House, about eight miles (thirteen kilometres) from Murdostoun, in what is now South Lanarkshire to allow her son to have full use of Murdostoun Castle. Sir Robert's son, Captain John Christie Stewart, succeeded him as laird of Murdostoun. The Stewarts remodelled Murdostoun Castle into a very comfortable residence. They were fond of their dogs and created a pet cemetery in which their dogs were buried. Captain John Stewart died in May 1978. The Murdostoun estate passed to a great-nephew and the property was sold in 1979.

== Today ==
Murdostoun Castle was recently used as an alcohol-related brain damage care unit. This facility was managed by Four Seasons Health Care, Ltd. Murdostoun Castle has three main buildings set in 37 acres (15 hectares) of mixed park and woodland. The Frank Jamieson wing was a modern purpose-built facility, providing nursing and social care in a selection of differing rooms for single occupancy. As well as bright airy rooms, a large conservatory and enclosed-garden area are available. The two care facilities closed down for refurbishment in 2010 leaving just the 20-bed brain injury rehabilitation centre. Recent refurbishment by the Huntercombe Group saw the newer buildings on the site managed as rehabilitation and care centres from a variety of neurological conditions while the castle is home to the Abbeycare Foundation, a private addiction centre.

== See also ==
- Murdostoun (ward)
- South Calder Water
- Wishaw
