= Gavin Hamilton (artist) =

Scottish neoclassical history painter (1723–1798)

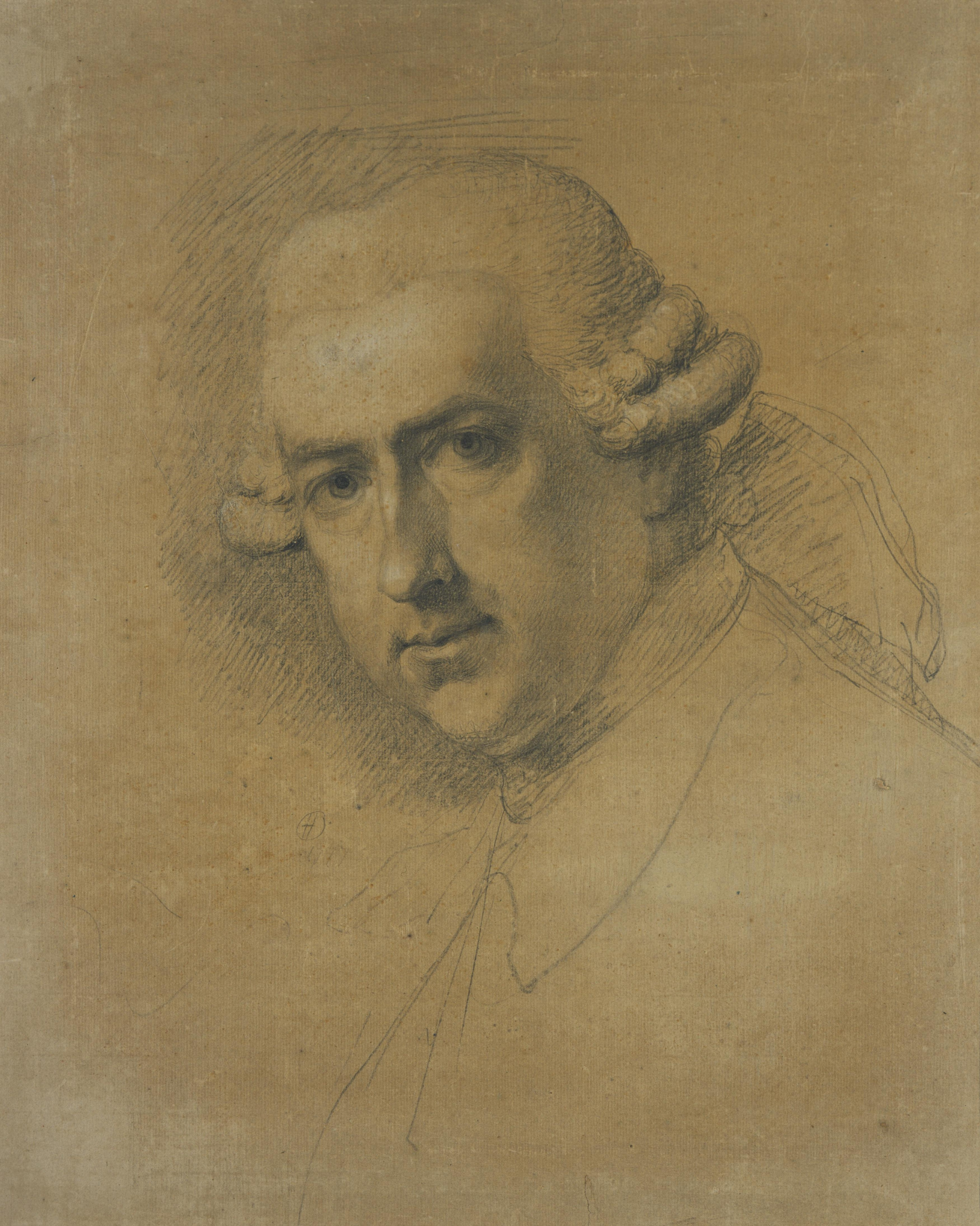
- Hamilton by Ozias Humphry, 1778, pencil, NGS
- Born: 1723 ODNB; Murdostoun, Lanarkshire, Scotland
- Died: 4 January 1798 (aged 74–75); Rome, Papal States
- Movement: Neoclassicism, Scottish Enlightenment
- Relatives: James Hamilton (brother); James Hamilton (nephew)

Gavin Hamilton (1723 – 4 January 1798) was a Scottish neoclassical history painter, who is more widely remembered for his searches for antiquities in the neighbourhood of Rome. These roles in combination made him an arbiter of neoclassical taste.

== Biography ==
Born in Lanarkshire, Scotland in 1723, he matriculated at the University of Glasgow under the Professor of Humanity at the age of 15. By 1744 he was in Italy, and probably studied in Rome in the studio of Agostino Masucci. From 1748 to 1750 he shared an apartment with James Stuart, Matthew Brettingham and Nicholas Revett, and with them visited Naples and Venice. On returning to Britain, he spent several years portrait-painting in London (1751–1756). At the end of that period, he returned to Rome. He lived there for the next four decades, until his death in 1798.

Aside from a few portraits of friends, the Hamilton family, and British people on the Grand Tour, most of his paintings, many of which are very large, were of classical Greek and Roman subjects. His most famous is a cycle of six paintings from Homer's Iliad, intended to have a pictorial impact equivalent to the epic grandeur of Homer as identified by Thomas Blackwell in his An Enquiry into the Life and Writings of Homer (1735), and also influenced by George Turnbull's Treatise on Ancient Painting (1740). As engraved by Domenico Cunego and reproduced, these were disseminated widely and enormously influential. Also influential was Hamilton's Death of Lucretia (1760s), also known as the Oath of Brutus. This inspired a series of "oath paintings" by European painters, which included Jacques-Louis David's noted Oath of the Horatii (1784). Like most later paintings of the scene, it placed it over Lucretia's dead body. In Livy it is made later, after the overthrow of the Roman monarchy.

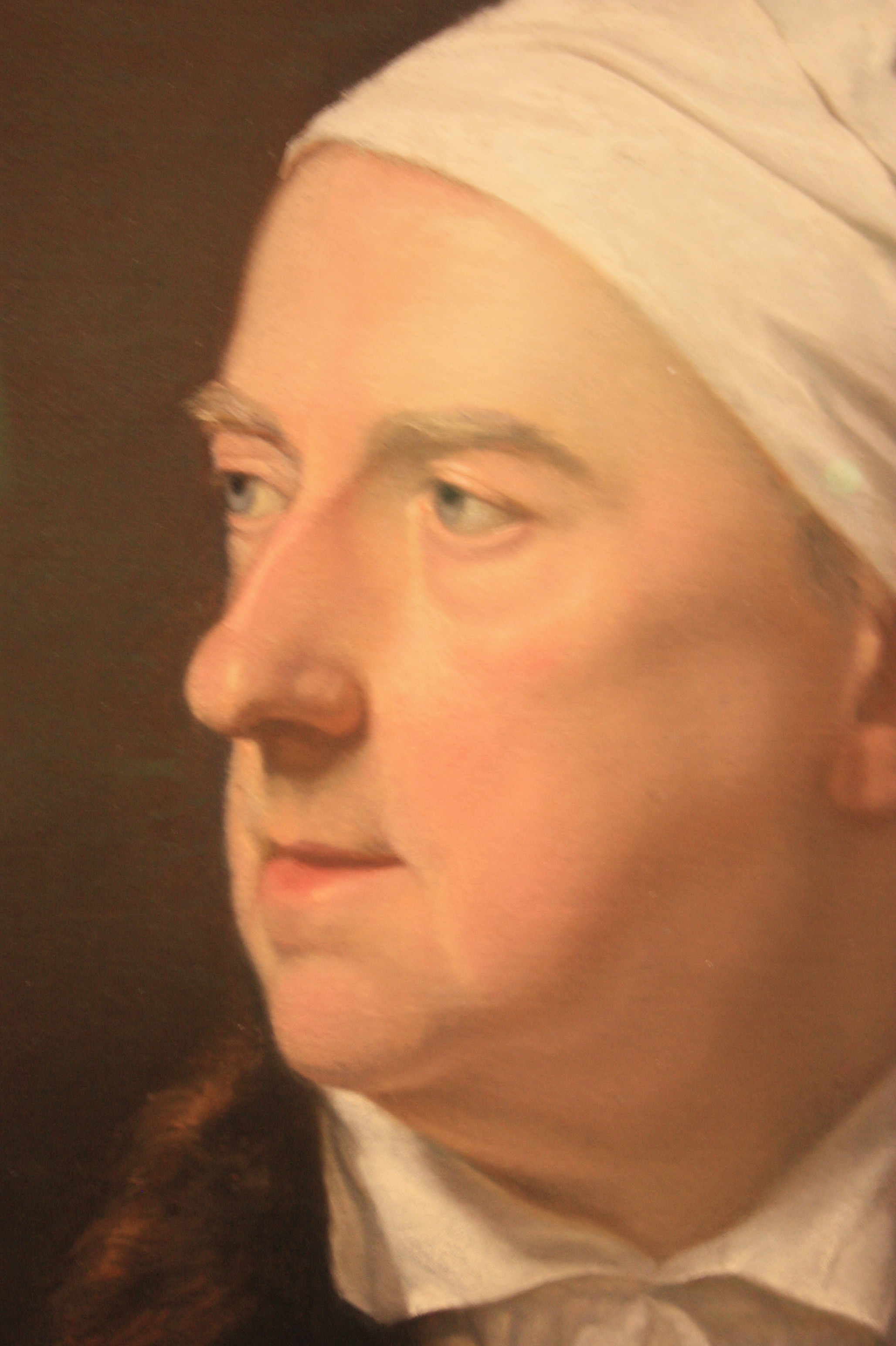
Pastel portrait of Gavin Hamilton (detail) by Archibald Skirving, 1788

As a painter of classical subjects, Hamilton was highly regarded by Johann Joachim Winckelmann, writer Goethe, young sculptor Antonio Canova and others in Rome. He received a commission to paint the altar piece of Sant'Andrea degli Scozzesi, the Scottish national church in Rome, for which he portrayed the Martyrdom of St Andrew. He was less widely appreciated in Britain, though his patrons included the Duke of Dorset, Lord Egremont, Viscount Palmerson, Lord Shelburne, Lord Spencer, Lord Hope and Sir James Grant. Among the artists who sought his favour and advice were Anne Forbes, William Cochran, David Allan and Alexander Nasmyth. As an art dealer and archaeologist, Hamilton undertook excavations at Hadrian's Villa in Tivoli in 1769–1771, at first to acquire marble for his sculptor to restore sculptures. His excavators reopened the outlet of a low-lying swampy area and "after some weeks' work underground by lamp-light and up to the knees in muddy water" retrieved sculptures from the muck, where they had been thrown centuries before with timber when Christians levelled the sacred grove.(Smith 1901:308). From 1771 Hamilton excavated other sites in the environs of Rome: Cardinal Flavio Chigi's Tor Colombaro, 1771–72, Albano, 1772, Monte Cagnolo 1772–73, Ostia 1774–75, the Villa Fonseca on the Caelian Hill in Rome, Roma Vecchia (the Villa dei Quintili), ca 1775 Castel di Guido and Gabii.

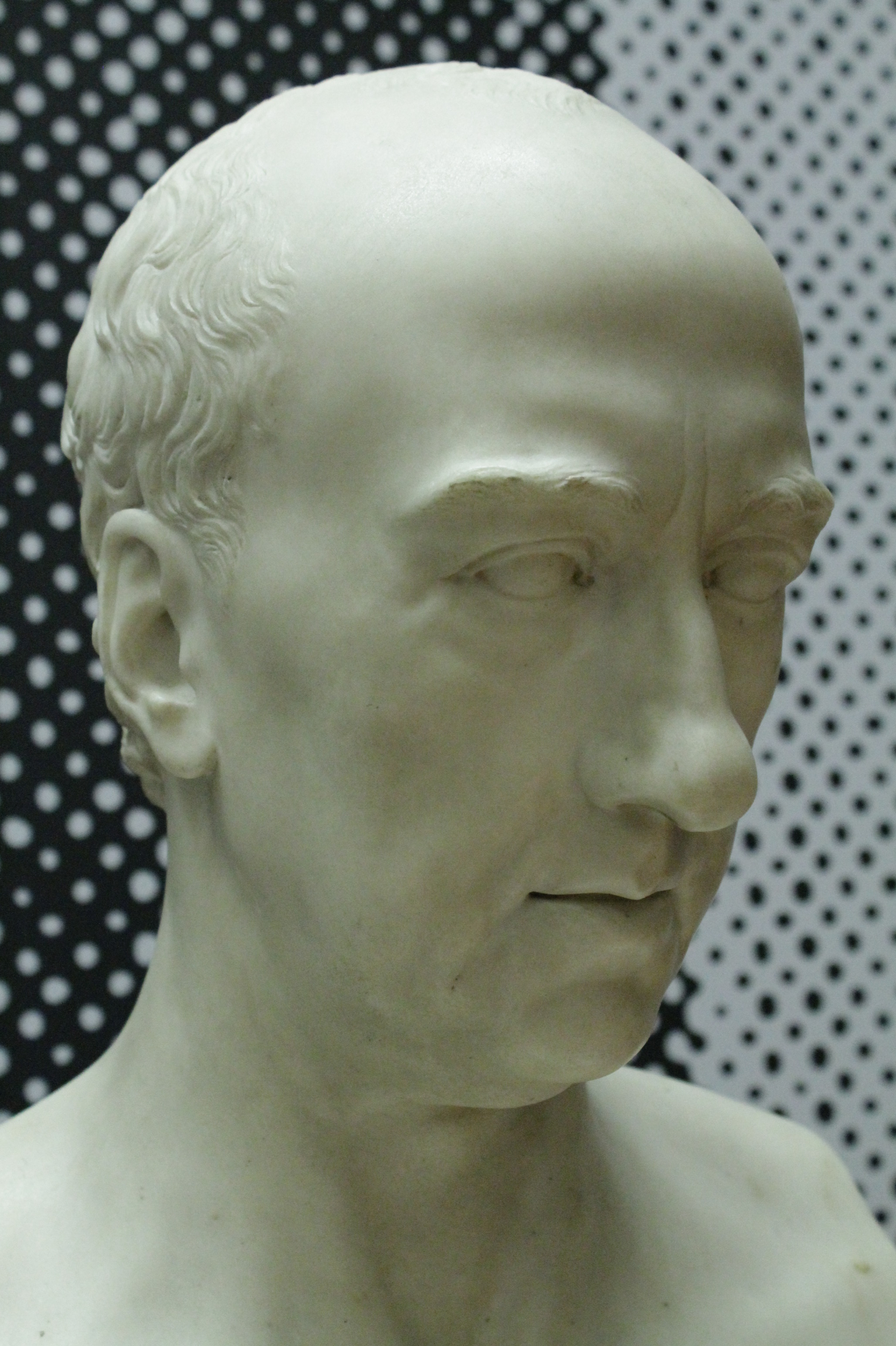
Gavin Hamilton by Christopher Hewetson, Hunterian Art Gallery, Glasgow

In an age when restorations to Roman sculptures were broadly conceived and the refinishing of whole surfaces was still common practice, Hamilton maintained a reputation as an honest man who did not tamper unduly with the sculptures that passed through his hands. Hamilton sold many of the works of art he recovered to his British clients, most notably to Charles Townley, to whom the painter wrote: "the most valuable acquisition a man of refined taste can make, is a piece of fine Greek Sculpture"; and to William Petty, 2nd Earl of Shelburne at Shelburne, later Lansdowne House, London. In 1771 Hamilton discovered the Warwick Vase at Hadrian's Villa. He sold it to Sir William Hamilton, a connoisseur and the British envoy at Naples.

Gavin Hamilton worked closely with Giovanni Battista Piranesi. He was an early advisor of Antonio Canova, a young sculptor whom he met at a dinner party in December 1779 on Canova's first visit to Rome. The painter advised the younger man to put aside his early, Rococo manner and concentrate on conflating the study of nature with the best of antiquities and a narrow range of classic modern sculptors.

In 1785 Hamilton bought Leonardo da Vinci's Virgin of the Rocks and sent it to London for sale. His purchase was the version now held by the National Gallery, London.

Such hunting and sale of antiquities was considered a marginally shady undertaking. Hamilton was successful in making generous offerings to the Vatican's Museo Pio-Clementino, as the Pope claimed one-third of all excavated works and had the right to forbid export of outstanding treasures. In addition, Hamilton paid landowners for excavating rights, so kept his peace with them.

He died in Rome on 4 January 1798.

== Gallery ==
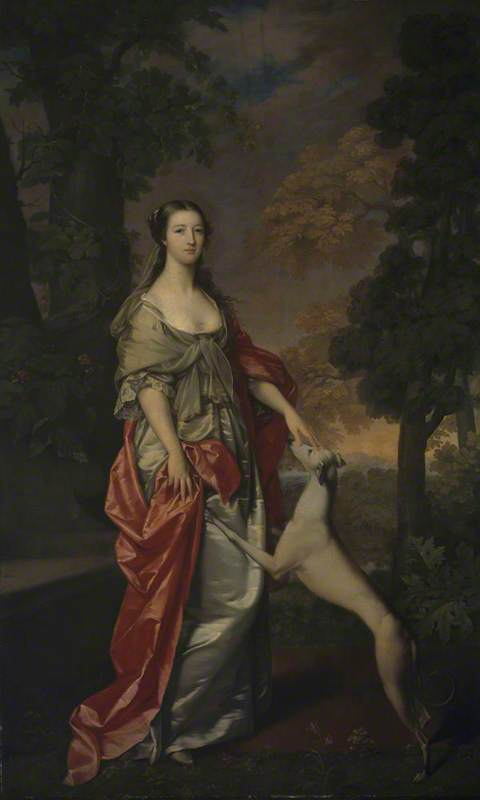
Elizabeth Gunning (1752/53)

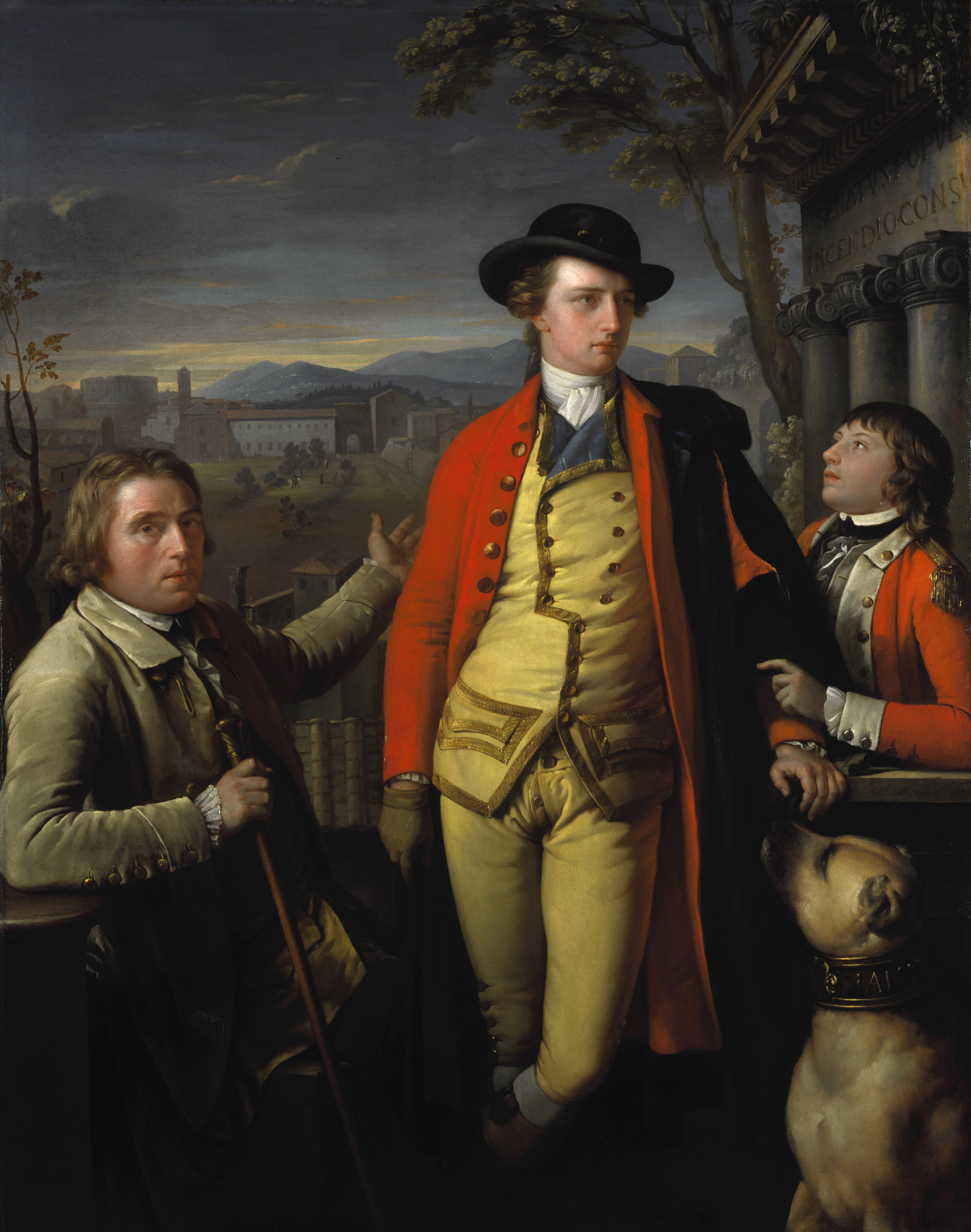
Douglas Hamilton, 8th Duke of Hamilton (1775–77)

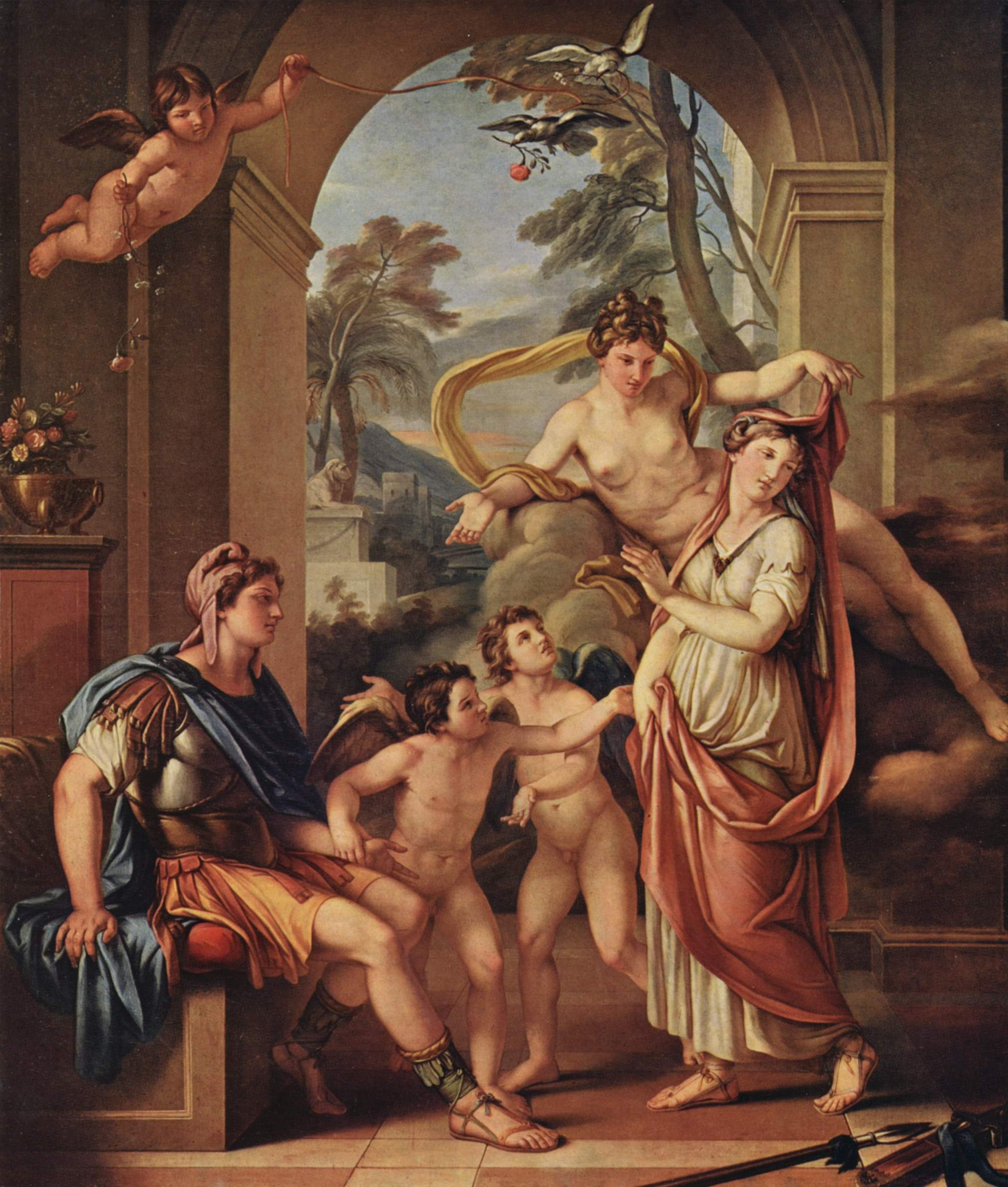
Venus giving Paris Helen as his wife (1782–84), held by Palazzo Braschi, Rome

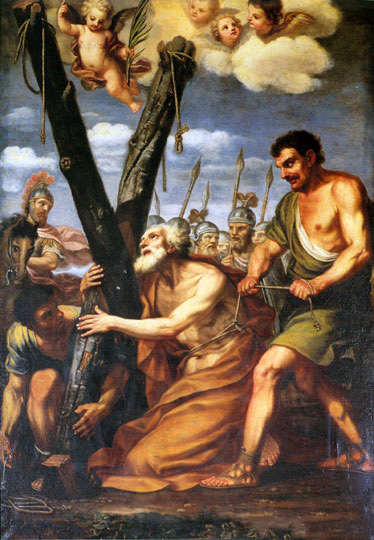
Martyrdom of St. Andrew, held by the Pontifical Scots College, Rome

== See also ==
- William Hamilton (diplomat)
- Charles Townley
