= James Hamilton (British Army officer, born 1777) =

Colonel of the Royal Scots Greys (1777–1815)

James Inglis Hamilton
- Born: Jamie Anderson; 4 July 1777; New York, British America
- Died: 18 June 1815 (aged 37); Waterloo, United Kingdom of the Netherlands
- Relatives: James Inglis Hamilton (adopted father)
- Military career
- Allegiance: Great Britain; United Kingdom
- Branch: British Army
- Service years: 1792–1815
- Rank: Lieutenant colonel
- Conflicts: War of the Seventh Coalition; Battle of Waterloo †

Lieutenant colonel James Inglis Hamilton (born Jamie Anderson, 4 July 1777 – 18 June 1815) was a Colonel in the British Army killed at the Battle of Waterloo.

== Early life ==
He was born as Jamie Anderson on 4 July 1777 at a camp of the Saratoga Campaign in New York. He was the second son of William Anderson, a Sergeant-Major of the 21st Foot. Hamilton was baptized on 28 August 1777. General James Inglis Hamilton adopted him following the Battle of Bemis Heights, and funded his education at Glasgow Grammar School and the University of Glasgow .

== Military career ==
Hamilton's adopted father opened a spot in the British Army and Hamilton became a cornet in the Royal Scots Greys in 1792. This is when he changed his name to James Hamilton. Hamilton was promoted to lieutenant on 4 October 1793. On 15 April 1794, he was promoted to captain. Hamilton became a major on 17 February 1803. He was promoted to lieutenant colonel on 16 June 1807, and he commanded the Royal Scots Greys. On 4 June 1814, Hamilton was promoted to colonel.

=== Battle of Waterloo ===
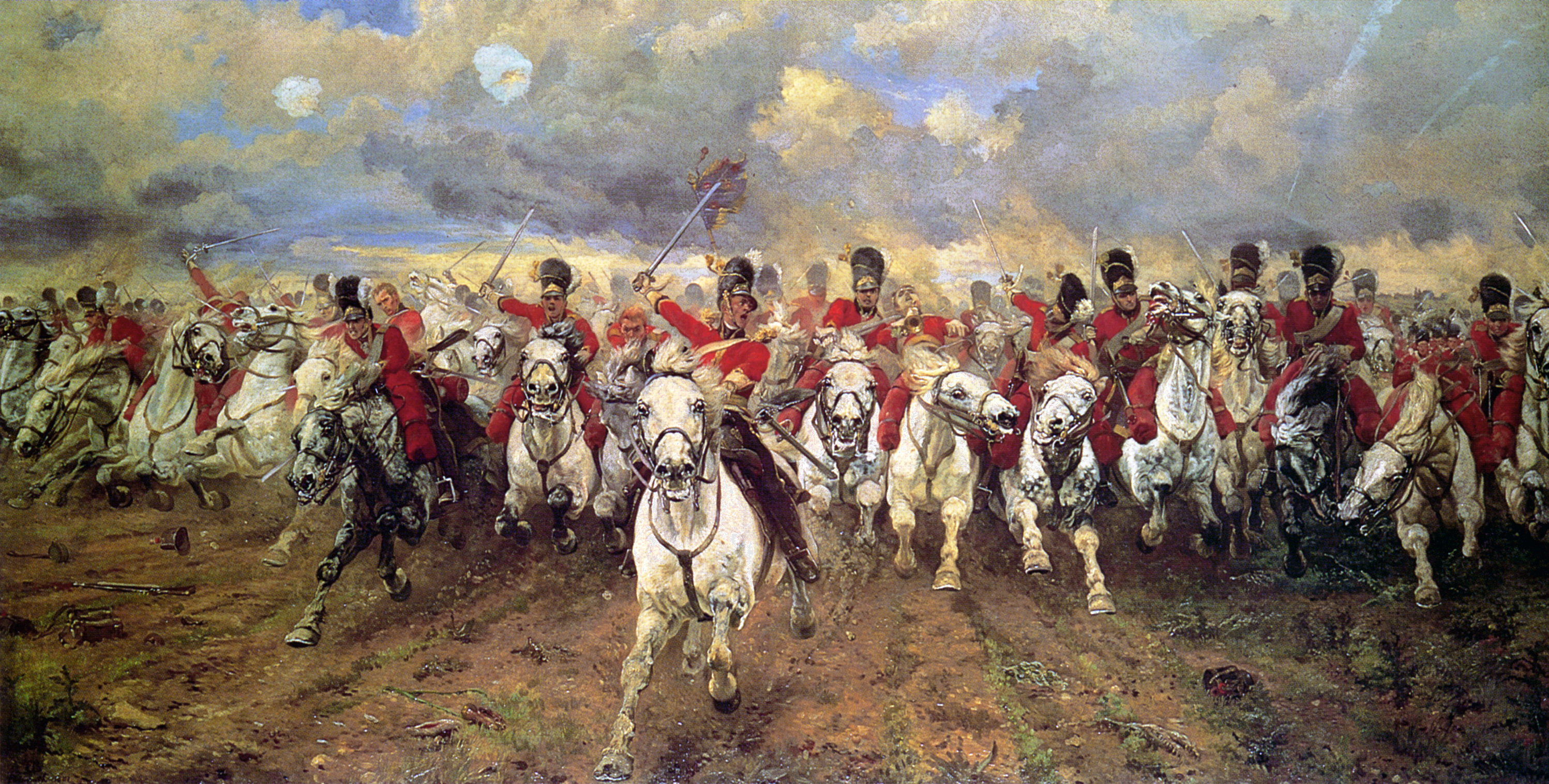
Scotland Forever! by Lady Butler with Hamilton thought to be the central figure leading the charge.

By the time of the Battle of Waterloo on 18 June 1815 he was a Lieutenant-Colonel in command of the Royal Scots Greys.

On that fateful day Hamilton reported to Maj Gen. Sir William Ponsonby in the so-called Union Brigade, because it consisted of regiments from England (Royal Dragoons), Scotland (Greys) and Ireland (6th Dragoons).

Just after 1:30pm, with the French infantry advancing and threatening to break the British centre, overall cavalry commander, Earl of Uxbridge ordered the Household Brigade and the Union Brigades to attack the French infantry of D'Erlon's I Corps.

Although held in reserve, Lt Col Hamilton witnessed the 92nd Highlanders Regiment beginning to falter and on his own initiative, ordered the Scots Greys forward at the walk because the ground was broken and uneven. The arrival of the Scots Greys helped to rally the 92nd Highlanders, who turned to attack the French.

While leading a charge on horseback, he lost his left arm. Hamilton put the reins in his mouth and continued the charge, even after his right arm was severed by a French lancer. Moments later he was shot and killed in action. Hamilton's second in command

The Royal Scots Greys continued to fight and suffered heavy losses but are generally credited with saving the British center for collapse in that section of the immense Battle of Waterloo. Hamilton was later found with a bullet wound through his heart, as well as other injuries. His scabbard and silken sash were sent to his brother, Lieutenant Jno. Anderson, who died in Glasgow on 3 December 1816 from wounds received at the Battle of Salamanca.

== Personal life ==
Hamilton married Mary Inglis Payne. Upon Hamilton's death, Payne was compensated £200.

He inherited Murdostoun Castle from his father on 18 August 1803.
