= Newby Hall =

Grade I listed house in North Yorkshire, England

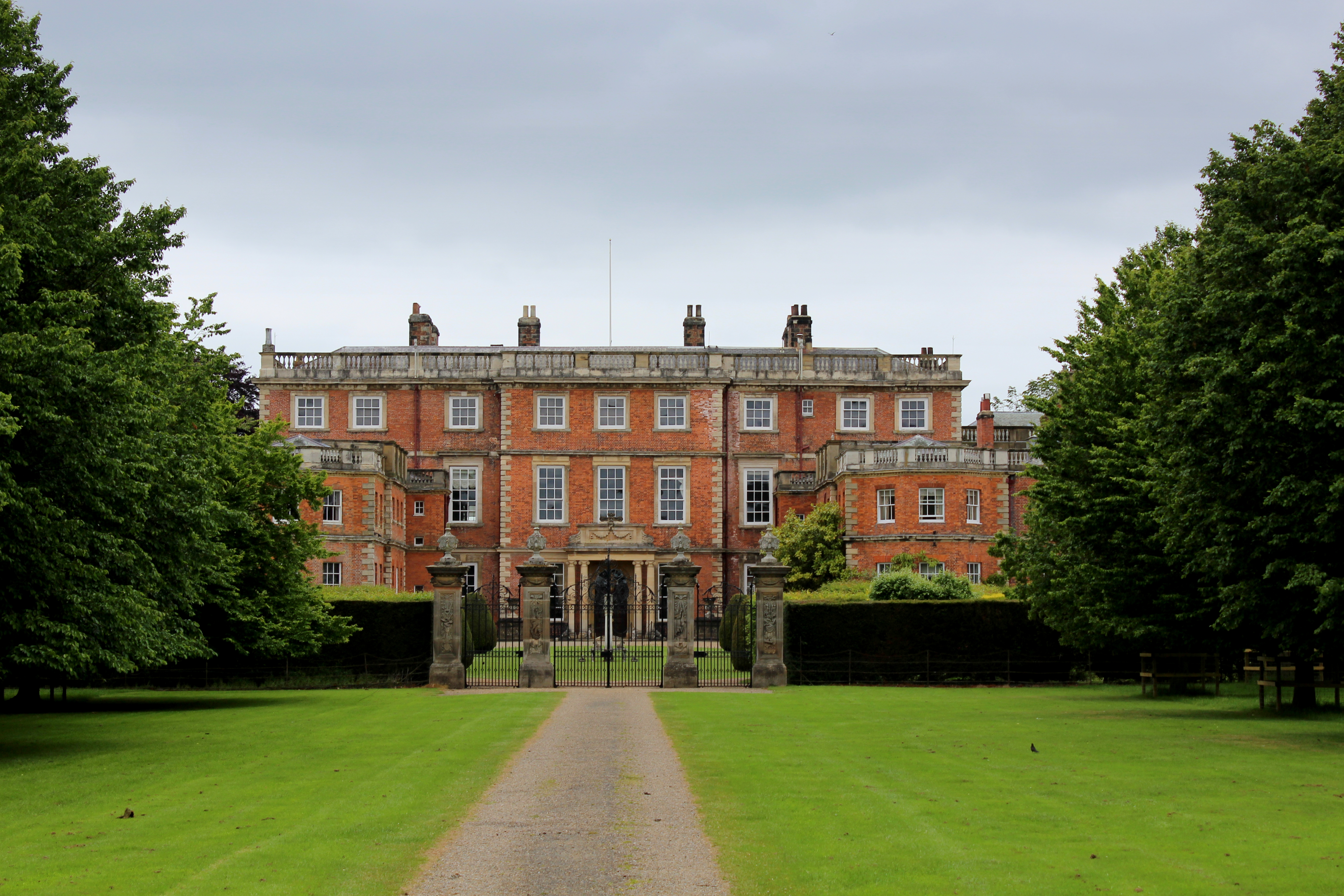
- "The finest house I saw in Yorkshire"

- Location within North Yorkshire
- 54.1017°N 1.4695°W
- Type: House
- Location: Skelton-on-Ure, North Yorkshire

History
- Built: 1695–1705, with later additions

Site notes
- Architect(s): Sir Christopher Wren (attributed), John Carr and Robert Adam
- Owner: Richard Compton

Listed Building – Grade I
- Official name: Newby Hall
- Designated: 23 April 1952
- Reference no.: 1150307

Listed Building – Grade I
- Official name: Stables 150M north of Newby Hall
- Designated: 23 April 1952
- Reference no.: 1150308

Listed Building – Grade II
- Official name: Inner and outer pairs of gate piers, with gates, 50M east of Newby Hall
- Designated: 29 October 1987
- Reference no.: 1289313

Listed Building – Grade II
- Official name: Equestrian statue 150M east of Newby Hall
- Designated: 6 March 1967
- Reference no.: 1289184

Listed Building – Grade I
- Official name: Skelton Lodges to Newby Hall
- Designated: 6 March 1967
- Reference no.: 1289365

Newby Hall is a country house beside the River Ure in the parish of Skelton-on-Ure in North Yorkshire, England. It is 3 miles (4.8 km) south-east of Ripon and 6 miles (9.7 km) south of Topcliffe Castle, by which the manor of Newby was originally held. A Grade I listed building, the hall contains a collection of furniture and paintings and is surrounded by extensive gardens. Newby Hall is open to the public.

== History ==
The manor of Newby was originally held by the lords of Topcliffe Castle. In St Columba's Church at Topcliffe are several monuments to the Robinson family of Newby and Rainton. After the death of Sir John Crosland in 1670, the Crosland family sold the manor of Newby in the 1690s to Sir Edward Blackett, an MP for the constituency of Ripon. He demolished the existing manor house and in 1697 built a new mansion, reputedly with the assistance of Sir Christopher Wren. In 1697, when visiting Newby, Celia Fiennes described it as "the finest house I saw in Yorkshire". Blackett was succeeded in 1718 by his son Edward, who, in turn, was succeeded by his nephew also called Edward, who in 1748 sold the estate to Richard Elcock (later Richard Elcock Weddell), to whose young son William Weddell it passed in 1762.

William Weddell (1736–1792), an MP for the constituency of Malton, benefited from his great-uncle's South Sea Company fortune and improved and enlarged the house during the 1760s. The interior was remodelled, to the designs of several architects, including John Carr and Robert Adam. The building housed William Weddell's collection of Roman antiquities which he had brought back from Italy during 1764–5. Robert Adam died in 1792. William died in 1792, leaving the estate to Thomas Philip Robinson, Lord Grantham, who later changed his name to Thomas Weddell and was subsequently also known as Thomas de Grey, 2nd Earl de Grey. When he died in 1859, his titles passed to his nephew, George Robinson, 1st Marquess of Ripon, 2nd Earl of Ripon, but Newby Hall went to his daughter, Lady Mary Gertrude Robinson, who married Henry Vyner (1805–1861).

Lady Mary commissioned William Burges to build the Church of Christ the Consoler in the grounds in 1871–76 as a memorial to her son, who was killed by bandits in Greece in 1870. An equestrian statue brought to England by the Vyners and erected in London after the 1660 Restoration of the Monarchy, modified to depict Charles II trampling Cromwell, was re-erected at Newby in 1883. Another son, Henry Frederick Clare Vyner (1836–1883), inherited Newby, followed by his brother, Robert Charles de Grey Vyner (1842–1915), who was succeeded by his daughter Mary Evelyn Vyner, who inherited Newby herself in 1915 and had married Lord Alwyne Compton in 1886. She died in 1957.

== 20th and 21st centuries ==
The present owners, the Compton family, are matrilineal descendants of William Weddell. They have restored the property. The gardens, which have extensive herbaceous borders and woodland walks, were developed in their present form by Major Edward Compton, who took over Newby in 1921. His son, Major Robert Edward John (Robin) Compton (1922–2009) was chairman of Time-Life International for many years. He took over the running of Newby Hall in 1960, was appointed High Sheriff of North Yorkshire in 1978 and Deputy Lieutenant from 1981. In 1997, Robin Compton handed over the property to his younger son, Richard, his elder son James having inherited the Invercauld estate near Balmoral in Scotland. His father, Major Edward (Robin) Compton, had married Sylvia Farquharson of Invercauld.

In 1973, a miniature railway was constructed; it was enlarged in 1985. Running along the bank of the river, a train is pulled by a Battison-built 1/5-scale model of the Royal Scot (6100) on Sundays and bank holidays. (Note: The text on a buff ticket for the train ride, found as a bookmark in a 1987 paperback, reads on the front "The Royal Scot Newby Hall" with a line drawing of the original Royal Scot locomotive, and on the reverse: "The Newby Royal Scot, built in 1950, is an exact model one-fifth the size of its illustrious forebear and is able to pull a load of 2 1/2 tons. It is one of the finest working models in the country giving visitors to Newby Hall memorable rides through the orchards, bamboo groves and over rock pools alongside the river Ure...." Then follow details of when the train runs.) At other times the train is pulled by the Countess De Grey or Lady Mary Vyner, LPG-powered diesel-hydraulic locomotives designed by David Curwen and built by Severn Lamb.

The 2007 ITV/PBS film of Jane Austen's Mansfield Park was filmed at Newby Hall. It was also the location for Hundreds Hall in the 2018 film The Little Stranger. It was featured on an episode of An American Aristocrat's Guide to Great Estates on the Smithsonian Channel and Amazon Prime Video which first aired in 2020. Newby Hall was the venue for two episodes of BBC One’s Antiques Roadshow filmed in 2020 and transmitted in January and April 2021.

In 2016, Gyles Brandreth moved his Teddy bear museum to Newby Hall.

The hall holds the UK national collection of the genus Cornus (dogwoods). The collection was started in 1990 by the late Robin Compton, although some specimens date back as far as the 1930s. The oldest example is a fine Cornus kousa planted by Robin Compton's father.

== Architecture ==
The house is built of red brick with stone dressings, quoins, balustraded parapets, and grey slate roofs. The original building has three storeys and fronts of nine and five bays; the original central entrance has been converted into a window. The current entrance is from the east, this front has projecting wings of two storeys and seven bays. The added north dining room has two storeys and fronts of three and two bays. The main entrance has a porch with paired Ionic columns, an entablature, a cornice, and a carved blocking course. Most of the windows in the house are sashes.

== Other buildings ==
=== Skelton Lodges ===
At the eastern entrance to the grounds is a long symmetrical range of buildings. In the centre are double wrought iron gates flanked by inner stone piers, outside which are railings, outer piers and ramped walls. These lead to two-storey square lodges with one bay and grey slate roofs, then screen walls containing gateways, leading to single-storey three-bay lodges. Outside these are screen walls with gateways ramped up to massive end piers. The wall, gates and lodges are collectively grade I listed.

=== Stables ===
North of the hall is a grade I-listed stable range. It is built of brick, faced in stone on two sides, with rusticated quoins, stone dressings and hipped grey slate roofs. They form a quadrangular plan, with ranges of seven and nine bays. The eastern front has a central pedimented bay containing a round arch with a rusticated surround, and a triple keystone, flanked by round-headed niches, above which is a plaque and an oculus. The flanking bays have round-arched recesses with keystones and Diocletian windows above. On the roof is an octagonal cupola with a dome and an elaborate weathervane.

=== Nidd Ferry Disaster Memorial ===
The grade II-listed memorial, which has been moved from its original site, commemorates those lost in an accident. It is in gritstone, and about 3 metres (9.8 ft) high. It has a square base, and a round-arched recess on each side. Above are clustered Corinthian columns, some with grape decoration. Around the columns are four mushroom-shaped finials, and on the top are ball and cushion finials.

== See also ==
- Grade I listed buildings in North Yorkshire (district)
- Listed buildings in Newby with Mulwith

== Gallery ==
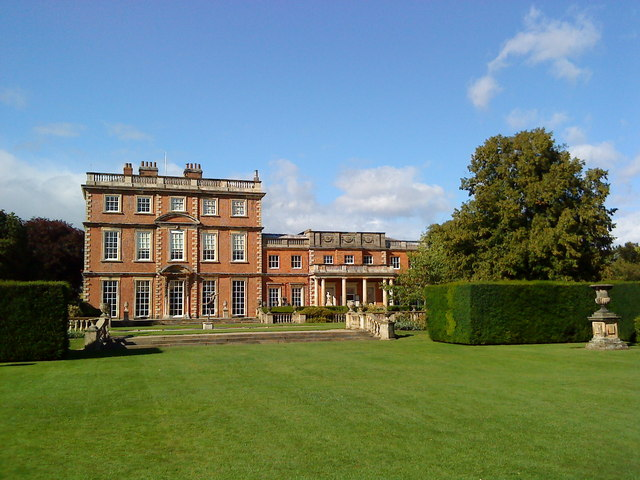
The house viewed from the garden

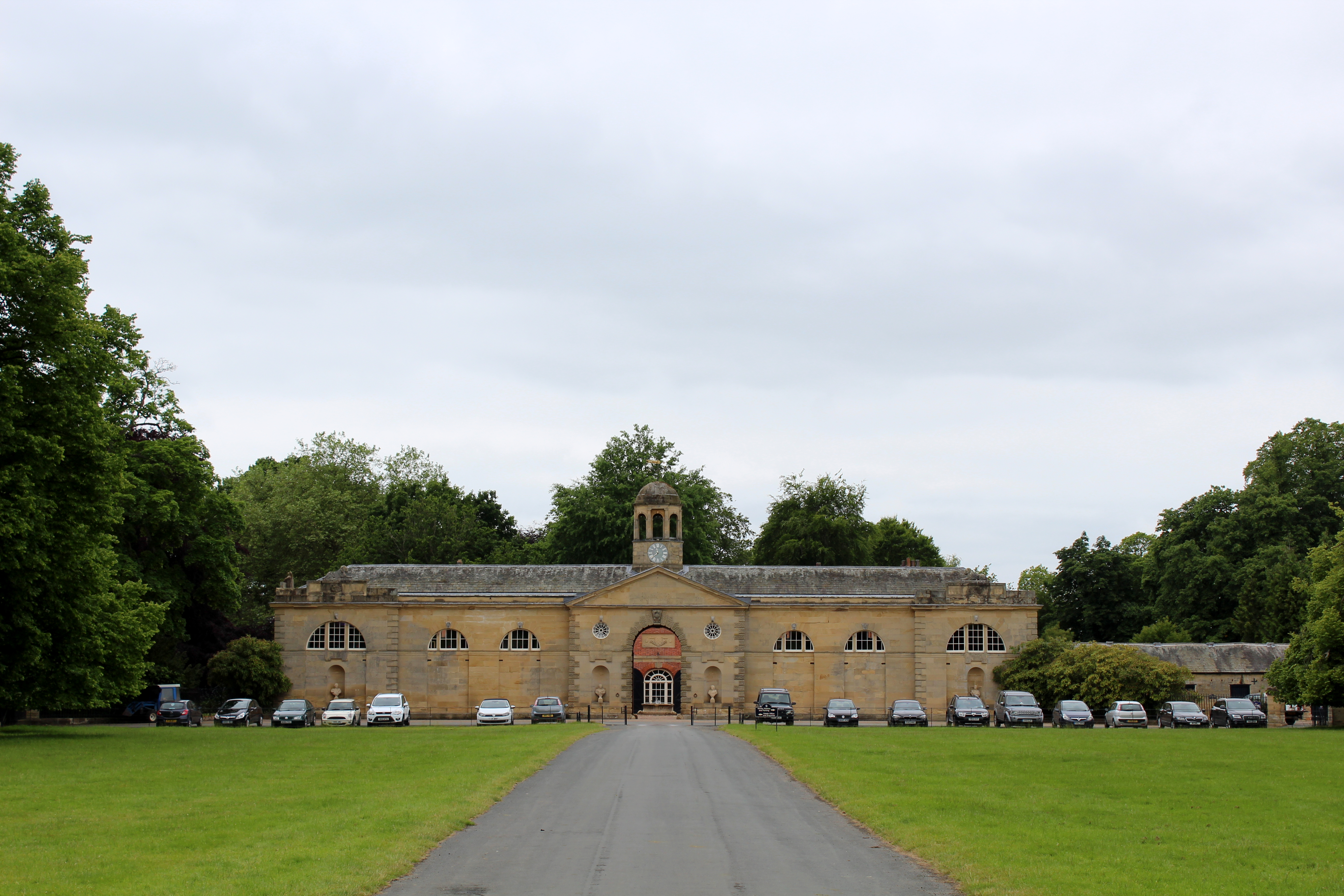
Stable block

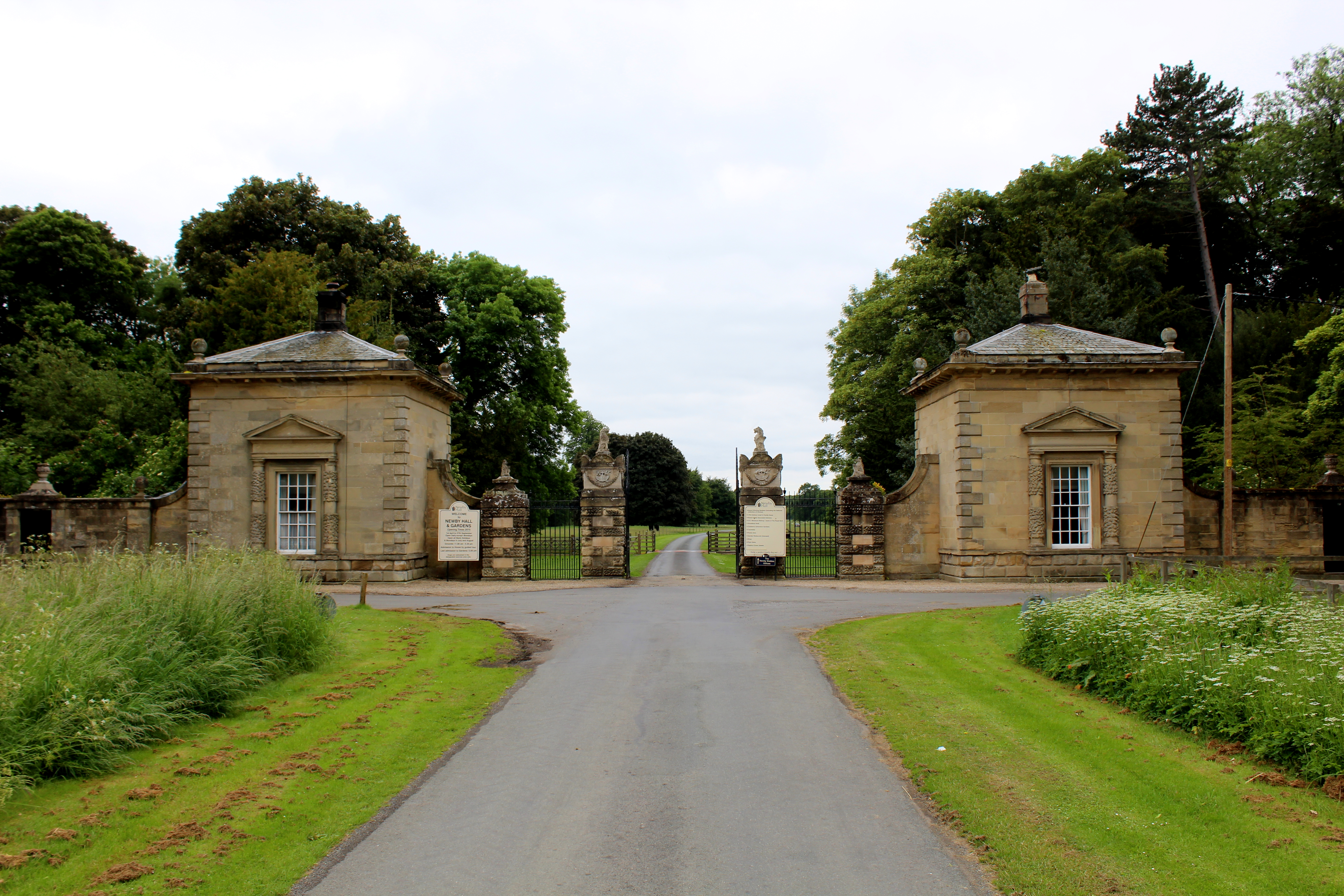
Gateway to the grounds

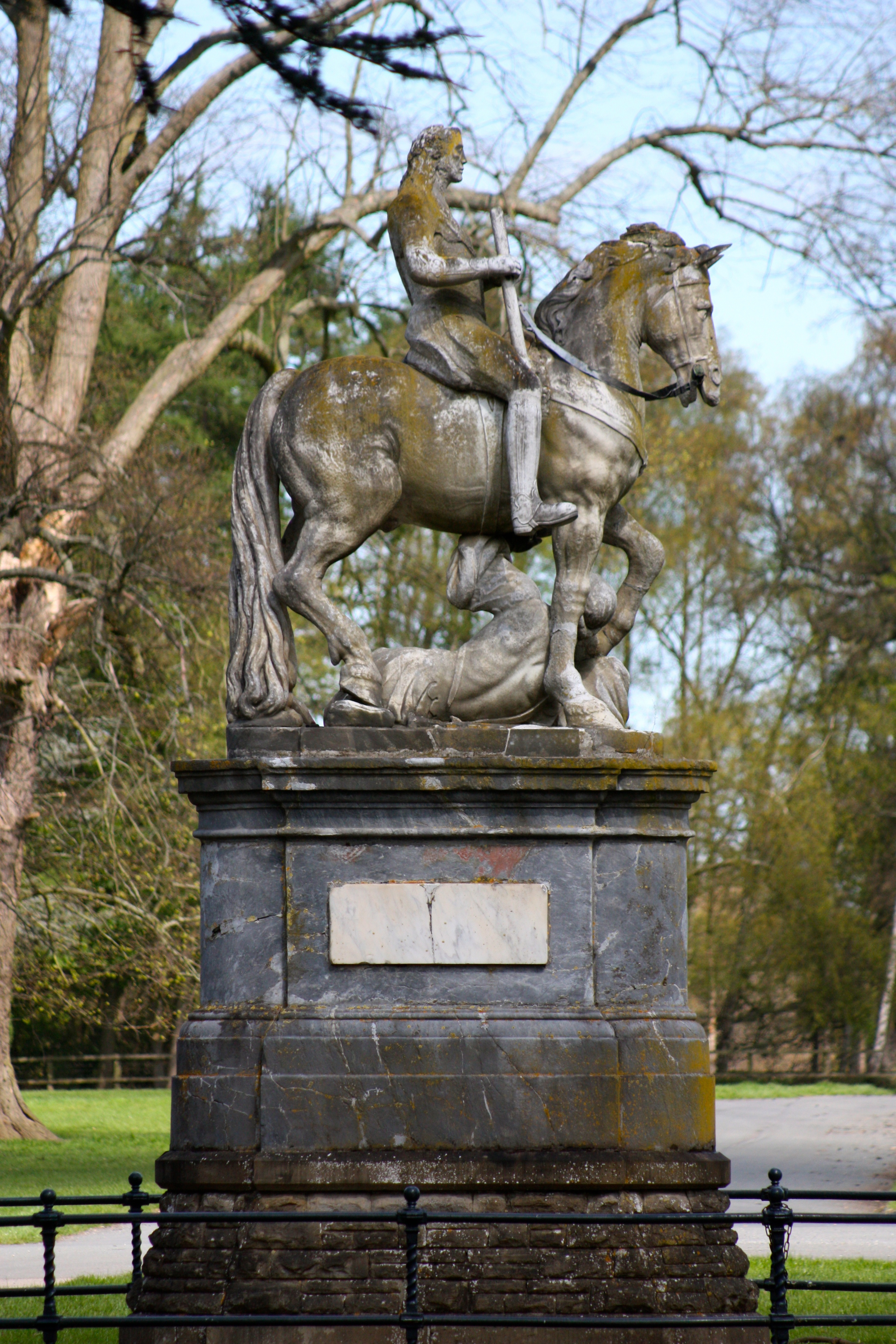
Equestrian statue of Charles II

== Sources ==
- Bignamini, I; Hornsby, C (2010). Digging And Dealing In Eighteenth-Century Rome. Yale University Press. ISBN 9780300160437. OCLC 757839951.
- Compton, Richard (2004). Newby Hall. Heritage House Group Ltd. ISBN 9780851013947. OCLC 351704003.
- Leach, Peter; Pevsner, Nikolaus (2009). Yorkshire West Riding: Leeds, Bradford and the North. The Buildings of England. Yale University Press. ISBN 978-0-300-12665-5.
- Drawing from the Past: William Weddell and the Transformation of Newby Hall. Leeds Museums & Galleries. 2004.
