= Skelton-on-Ure =

Village and civil parish in North Yorkshire, England

Coordinates: 54°06′34″N 1°26′57″W

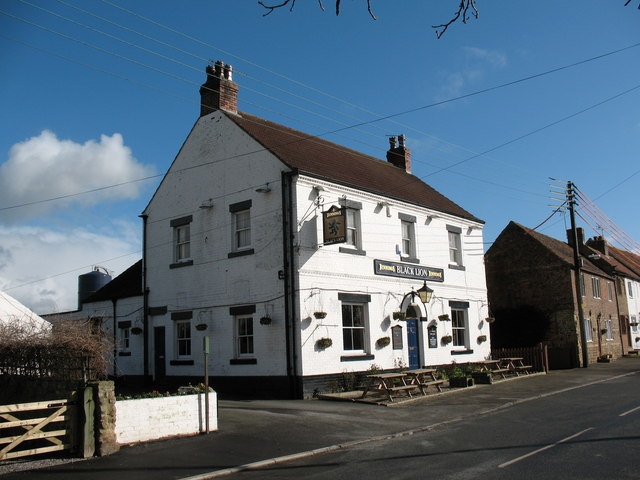
- The Black Lion

- Location within North Yorkshire
- Population: 361 (Including Westwick. 2011 census)
- OS grid reference: SE360683
- Civil parish: Skelton-on-Ure
- Unitary authority: North Yorkshire
- Ceremonial county: North Yorkshire
- Region: Yorkshire and the Humber
- Country: England
- Sovereign state: United Kingdom
- Post town: RIPON
- Postcode district: HG4
- Police: North Yorkshire
- Fire: North Yorkshire
- Ambulance: Yorkshire

Skelton-on-Ure or Skelton is a village and civil parish in the district and county of North Yorkshire, England. It is situated 1.9 miles (3 km) west of Boroughbridge, near the A1(M) motorway. There is one village pub called The Black Lion, a primary school, and one Village Store including a Post Office counter.

Until 1974 it was part of the West Riding of Yorkshire. From 1974 to 2023 it was part of the Borough of Harrogate, it is now administered by the unitary North Yorkshire Council.

The name Skelton derives from the Old English scelftūn meaning 'settlement on a shelf of land'.

The main entrance to Newby Hall Estate is situated at the south end of the village. It was used as a location in Jane Austen's Mansfield Park (2007) broadcast by PBS in its Complete Jane Austen series.

North-east of the village is Skelton Windmill, a Georgian windmill that was owned by the Newby Hall estate. Completed in 1822, the grade II listed building was used to grind corn and other cereals and is the best example of such a windmill left in North Yorkshire.

== Notable residents ==
- Frederick John Robinson (The Viscount Goderich), Prime Minister of the United Kingdom, 1827–28, was born in Newby Hall
- George Dawson (1821–1889), self-made man and property developer.

== See also ==
- Listed buildings in Skelton-on-Ure
