= Tudor food and drink =

Overview of food in 16th century England

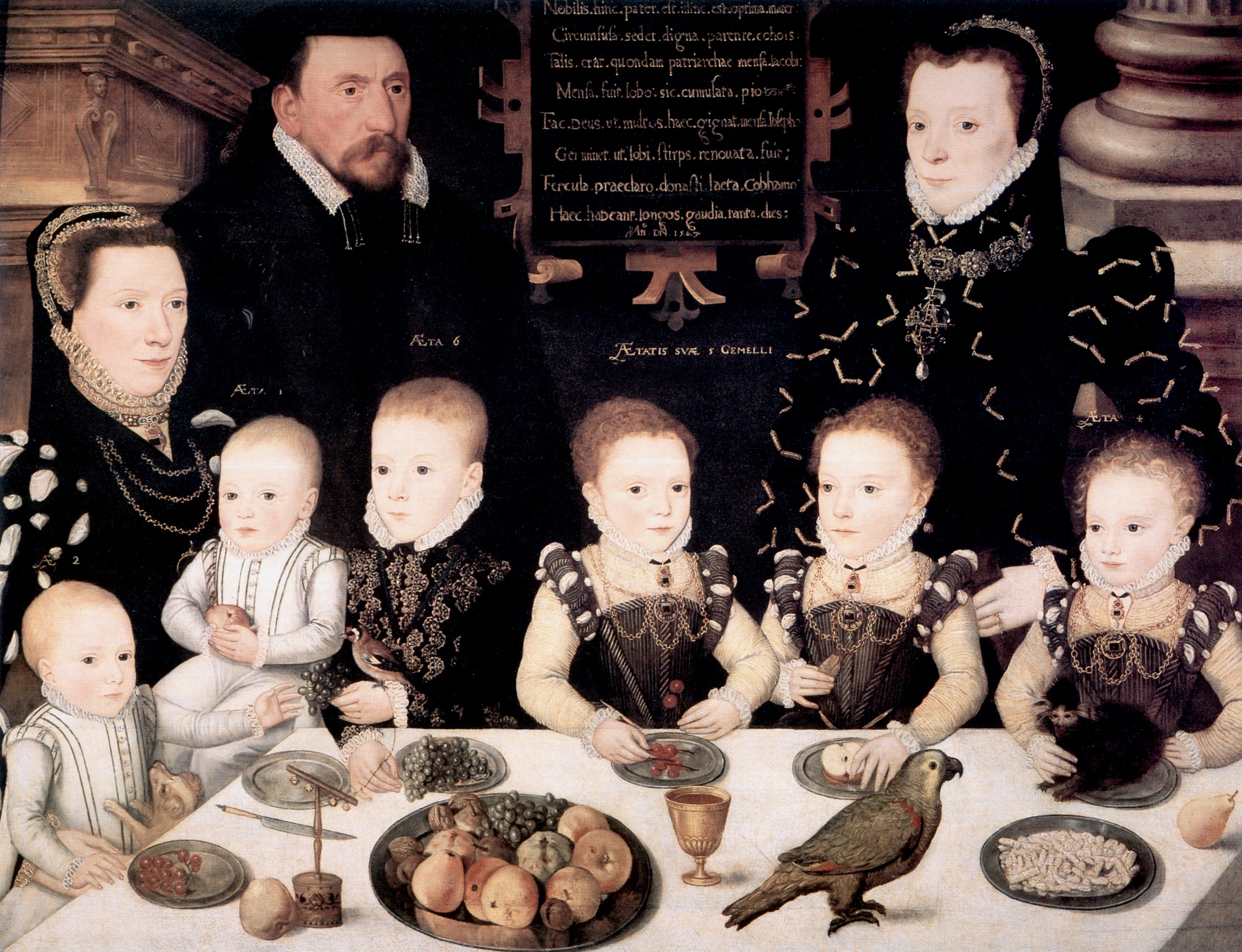
William Brooke and his sister, wife and children seated at a dining table, by the Master of the Countess of Warwick, 1567

Tudor food is the food consumed during the Tudor period of English history, from 1485 through to 1603. A common source of food during the Tudor period was bread, which was sourced from a mixture of rye and wheat. New foods were being brought from the newly discovered Americas, such as tomatoes and potatoes. The rich commonly held banquets that consisted of a large variety of courses. There were religious and legal restrictions on certain types of food that was not to be eaten on certain days. Ale and wine were the common drinks of the time. Meals were commonly eaten at 11am (dinner) and 5pm (supper), with some starting to eat breakfast in the early morning. Cookbooks had by now started to appear such as the highly influential Castel of Health (1595) and Herbal (1597).

== Food ==
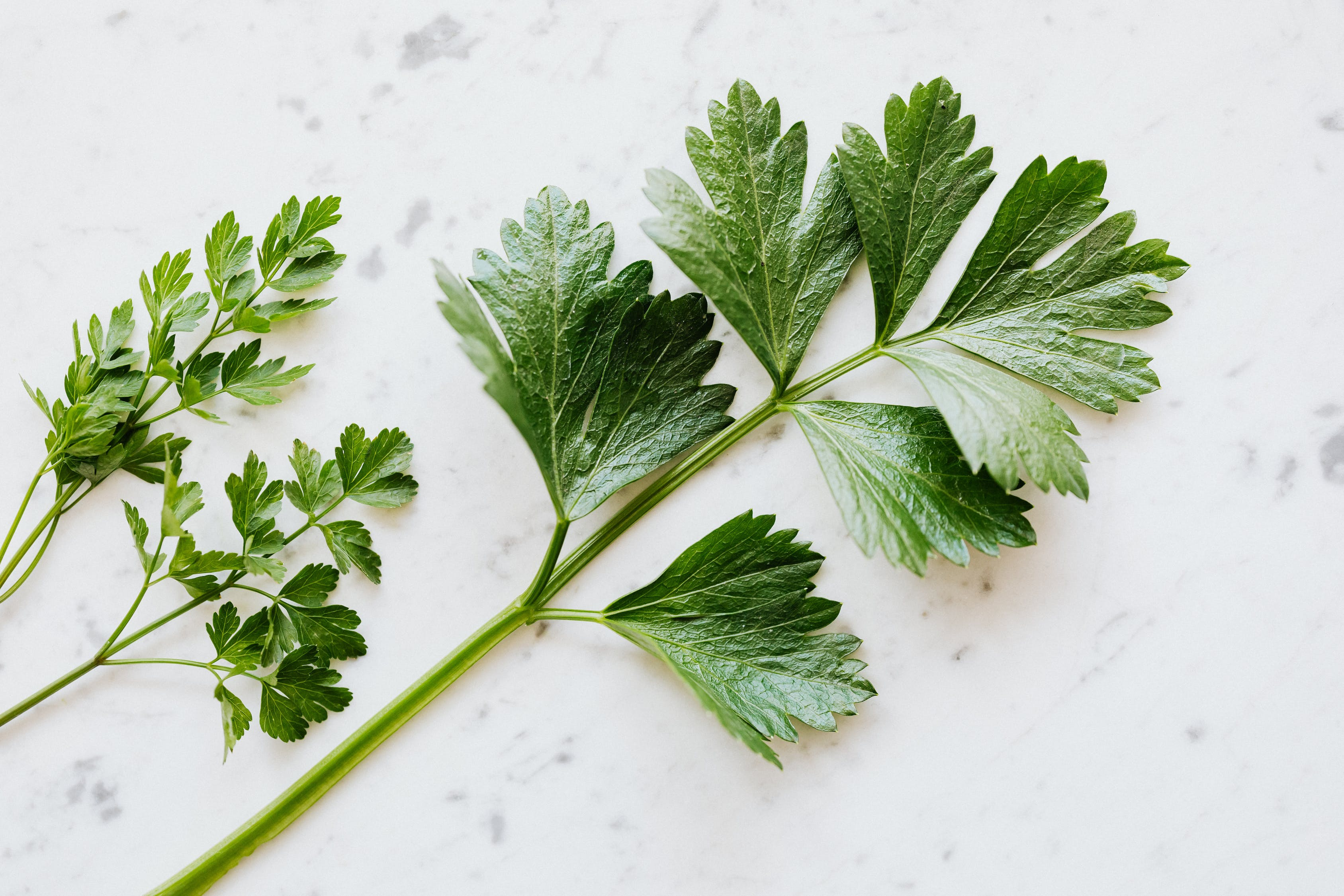
Parsley is one of the herbs the rich used to add flavor to their meals.

The common vegetables used in the Tudor period were onions and cabbages. However, nearer the end of the Tudor period, new foods were brought over from the Americas; these included tomatoes and potatoes. Herbs were often used by rich Tudors to flavour their meals. While faraway fruits are now imported (for the rich) such as oranges, lemons, dates, figs and marmalade from the Continent. They created separate herb gardens to grow what they needed, such as parsley, mint, rosemary, thyme, and sage.

Fruit was also eaten as part of the meal as ingredients or eaten separately. Some of the fruit eaten were apples, gooseberries, grapes and plums. However, dietaries of the time believed that eating too much unprocessed fruit was bad for the humors.

Tudors of all classes consumed bread in all of their meals as the main source of carbohydrates; however, its quality varied. The cheapest bread available was Carter's bread, which was a mixture of rye and wheat. The middle class or prosperous tenants ate ravel—also known as yeoman's bread—made of wholemeal. The most expensive bread was manchet, made of white wheat flour. It was often telling what social status one belonged to by what type of bread they ate.

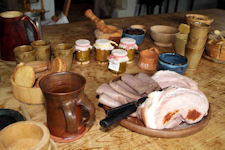
Tudor foods laid during a re-enactment

The common folk ate whatever they could catch from the rivers and the sea, like haddock and sole. The rich had more of a variety with sturgeon, seal, crab, lobster, and shrimp. The poor ate whatever meat they could find, such as rabbits, blackbirds, pheasants, partridges, hens, ducks, and pigeons. Meanwhile, the rich people also ate more costly varieties of meat, such as swan, peafowl, geese, boar, and deer (venison). Frumenty was also eaten in Tudor times.

The poor ate off wooden plates, merchants and yeomen ate from pewter plates while the rich ate off silver or gold plates, as Thomas Wolsey had done in Hampton Court. Knives were a common household item, so were spoons (new ostentatiously-designed silver spoons became a display of wealth) but forks were not common, even in palaces; meat was cut with a knife and eaten with the fingers.

Meat was eaten from Sundays to Thursdays, and fish was eaten on Fridays and Saturdays and during Lent. In 1549, Edward VI decreed Fridays and Saturdays as non-meat eating days after the Church had by long established meat-eating restrictions on Wednesdays, Fridays and Saturdays. Elizabeth I introduced a prohibition on animal slaughter for Wednesdays in 1563, three months imprisonment was the fine for breaking the law. To avoid fines, one was able to buy a license to eat meat any day of the week, the cost of the license depending on the social status of the purchaser.

== Banquets and feasts ==
The aristocrats held banquets and feasts consisting of different courses where each course had a variety of dishes brought out at the same time. People then could choose what they wanted to eat.

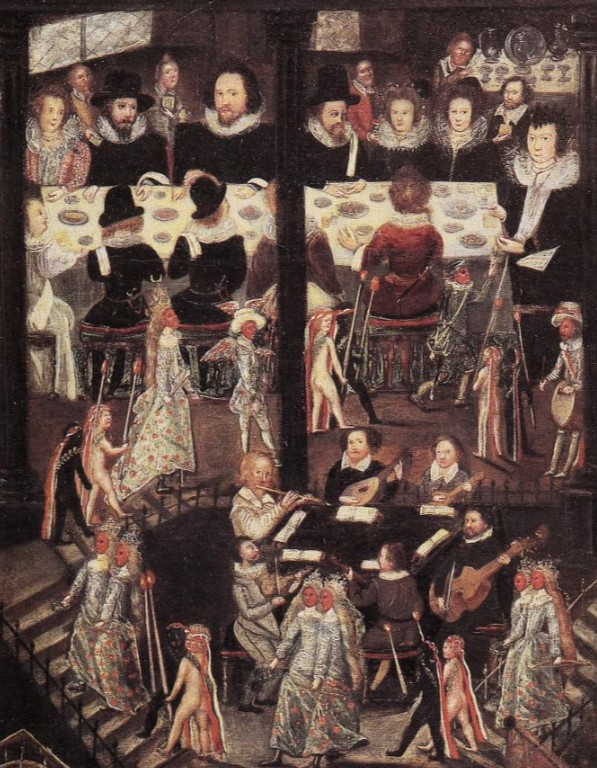
Henry Unton in a banquet with chamber orchestra and masques dressed in classical garb

=== Meat and poultry ===
- beef
- mutton
- veal
- lamb
- heron
- pigeon
- chicken
- venison pasty and haunch
- pheasant
- partridge
- quail
- sparrow
- goose

=== Fish ===
- lamprey
- haddock
- pike
- salmon
- chub
- sturgeon
- trout
- perch
- crayfish
- bass
- crab
- lobster
- shrimp
- herring

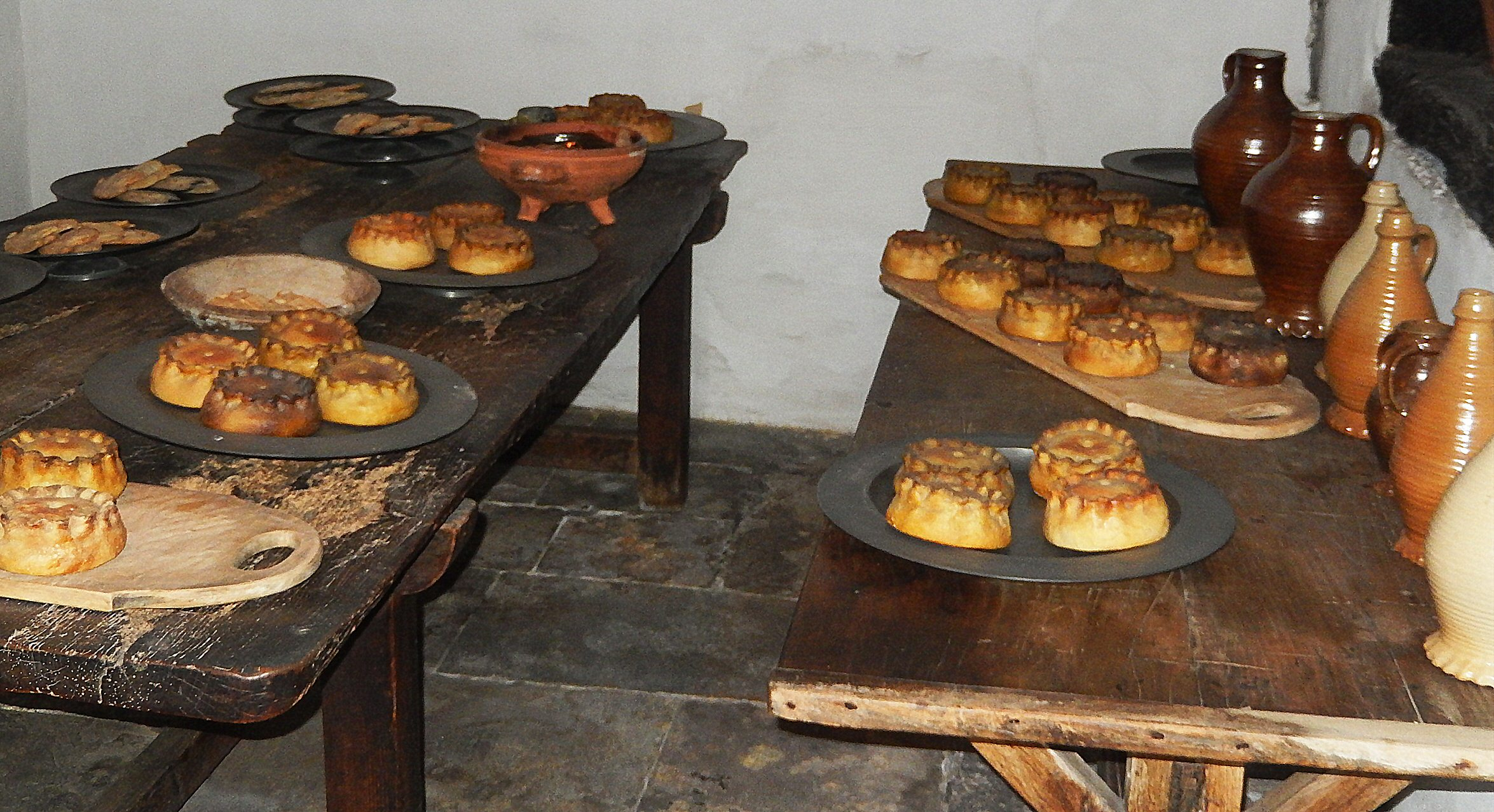
Tudor pies on pewter plates at Hampton Court

=== Sweet dishes ===
- tarts
- doucets (sweet flans)
- fritters
- eggs
- custards
- jelly
- cream of almonds
- fruit, baked and unbaked

== Beverages ==
Everyone drank ale during the Tudor period, as water was considered unhealthy. Ale at the time was brewed without hops, and was not particularly alcoholic. The rich also drank wine, which was mostly imported from Europe, though some wine was produced by vineyards in Southern England. In the early 16th century, wine was expensive for most commoners; an Act from 1536 therefore decreed that wine imported from France would have a price ceiling, with those imported from Greece and especially Spain with an even higher maximum selling price.

The rich drank from wine glasses imported from Italy, which were very expensive, while the poor drank from wooden goblets and cups.

== Eating out ==
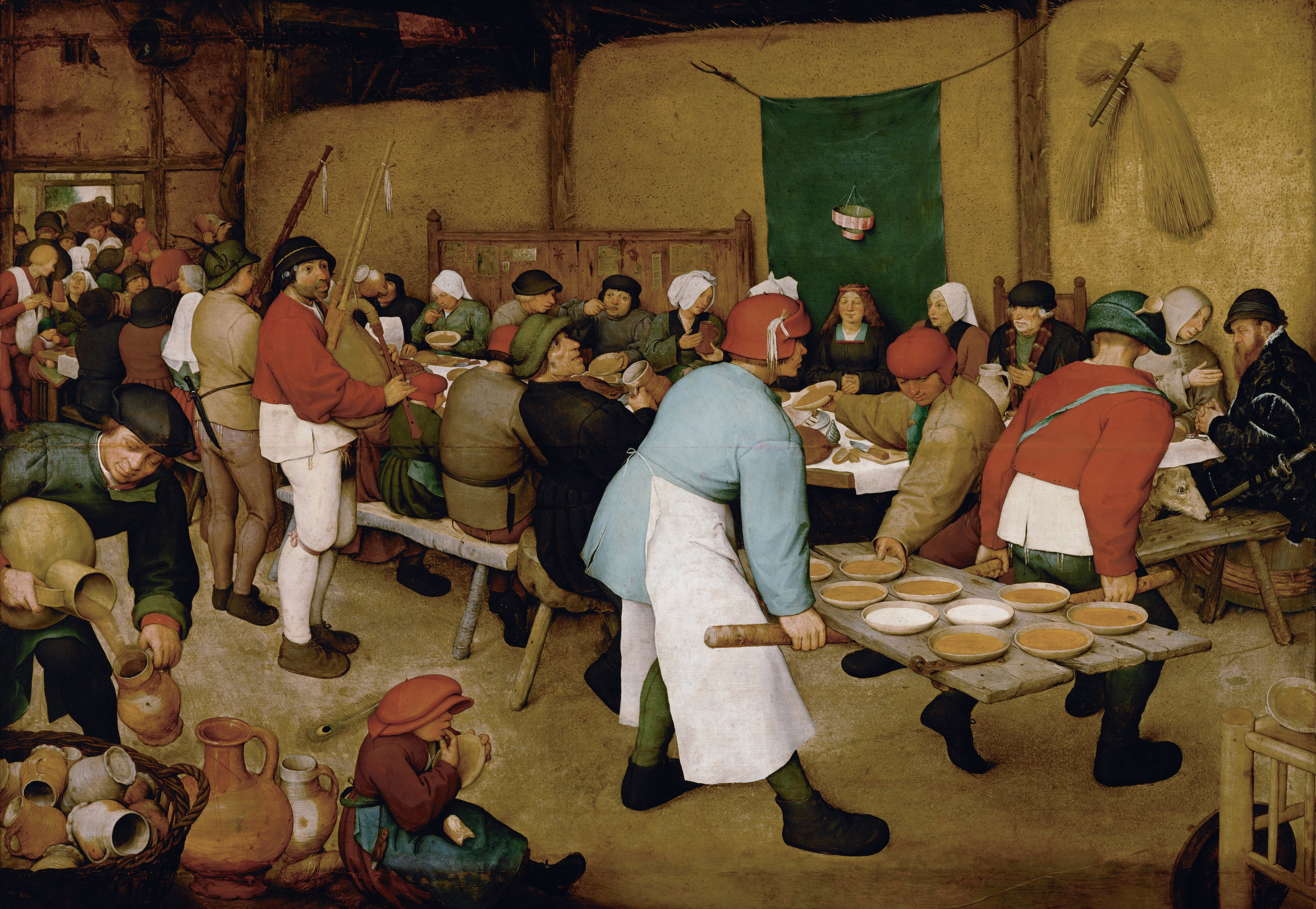
View of mid-16th century indoor eating, Pieter Brughel Peasant Wedding

By the time Shakespeare was producing his plays, eating or dining out was commonplace. Before the 1400s, there were no public eating-houses in the City of London. Before this, there were cookshops that acted as the fast food of the times. Martha Carlin stated, "It was meant to be eaten immediately, like a hamburger and fries today, but no seats or tables were provided, since fast-food cooks generally worked from cramped storefronts or from movable stalls."

By the 1370s, there were pavement cafes in the Westminster suburbs but no eating-houses proper. Inns and taverns were the first to do restaurant-like business as these establishments already had rooms with tables and chairs set aside for dining. The earliest evidence for this change is from the 1420s. Eating-houses appear around the 1550s.

== Table manners ==
Having clean hands was very important, as several people would dig into a common dish with their fingers. Therefore, they were advised to wash their hands out in the open where everyone could see, to make sure that they were clean. Besides that, manuals for manners from the Renaissance and Middle Ages listed some activities that were frowned upon at the dinner table, including:

- Putting fingers in the ears
- Putting hands on the heads
- Blowing nose with the hands
- Men were told to refrain from scratching
- Blowing noses off or wiping off sweat with napkins
- Poking around on a plate, possibly looking for a better piece of food
- Throwing bones on the floor. The proper place for bones was a platter
- The release of wind
