= Tudor period =

Period of English history (1485–1603) under the Tudor dynasty

- 1485–1603
Late Middle Ages	Stuart era
- The red and white rose of the House of Tudor
- Including: Elizabethan era
- Monarchs: Henry VII; Henry VIII; Edward VI; Lady Jane Grey (disputed); Mary I; Elizabeth I
- Leaders: Regents: Catherine of Aragon; Catherine Parr; Edward Seymour, 1st Duke of Somerset; John Dudley, 1st Duke of Northumberland

In England and Wales, the Tudor period occurred between 1485 and 1603, including the Elizabethan era. The Tudor period coincides with the reign of the House of Tudor, which began with the accession of Henry VII and ended with the death of Elizabeth I. Under the Tudor dynasty, art, architecture, trade, exploration, and commerce flourished. Historian John Guy (1988) argued that "England was economically healthier, more expensive, and more optimistic under the Tudors" than at any time since the ancient Roman occupation.

== Population and economy ==
Following the Black Death (1348) and the agricultural depression of the late 15th century, the population of England began to increase. In 1520, it was around 2.3 million. By 1600, it had almost doubled to 4 million. Prior to the Black Death the population had been much larger with numbers estimated at 4 to 6 million people The growing population stimulated economic growth, accelerated the commercialization of agriculture, increased the production and export of wool, encouraged trade, and promoted the growth of London.

The high wages and abundance of available land seen in the late 15th and early 16th centuries were replaced with low wages and a land shortage. Various inflationary pressures, perhaps due to an influx of New World gold and a rising population, set the stage for social upheaval, with the gap between the rich and poor widening. This was a period of significant change for the majority of the rural population, with manorial lords beginning the process of enclosure of village lands that previously had been open to everyone.

== English Reformation ==
The Reformation transformed English religion during the Tudor period. The five sovereigns, Henry VII, Henry VIII, Edward VI, Mary I, and Elizabeth I, had entirely different approaches, with Henry VIII replacing the pope as the head of the Church of England but maintaining Catholic doctrines, Edward imposing a very strict Protestantism, Mary attempting to reinstate Catholicism, and Elizabeth arriving at a compromise position that defined the not-quite-Protestant Church of England. It began with the insistent demands of Henry VIII for an annulment of his marriage that Pope Clement VII refused to grant.

Historians agree that the great theme of Tudor history was the Reformation, the transformation of England from Catholicism to Protestantism. The main events, constitutional changes, and players at the national level have long been known, and the major controversies about them largely resolved. Historians until the late 20th century thought that the causes were a widespread dissatisfaction or even disgust with the evils, corruptions, failures, and contradictions of the established religion, setting up an undertone of anti-clericalism that indicated a rightness for reform. A secondary influence was the intellectual impact of certain English reformers, such as the long-term impact of John Wycliffe (1328–1384) and his "Lollardy" reform movement, together with a stream of Reformation treatises and pamphlets from Martin Luther, John Calvin, and other reformers on the continent. The interpretation by Geoffrey Elton in 1960 is representative of the orthodox interpretation. He argued that:

The existing situation proved untenable because the laity feared, resented, and despised much about the Church, its officers, its courts and its wealth. ... A poverty-stricken and ignorant lower clergy, wealthy bishops and abbots, a wide ramification of jurisdiction, a mixture of high claims and low deeds did not make for respect or love among the laity.

Social historians after 1960 investigated English religion at the local level, and discovered the dissatisfaction had not been so widespread. The Lollardy movement had largely expired, and the pamphleteering of continental reformers hardly reached beyond a few scholars at the University of Cambridge—King Henry VIII had vigorously and publicly denounced Luther's heresies. More important, the Catholic Church was in a strong condition in 1500. England was devoutly Catholic, it was loyal to the pope, local parishes attracted strong local financial support, religious services were quite popular both at Sunday Mass and at family devotions. Complaints about the monasteries and the bishops were uncommon. The kings backed the popes and by the time Luther appeared on the scene, England was among the strongest supporters of orthodox Catholicism, and seemed a most unlikely place for a religious revolution.

== Tudor government ==
=== Henry VII: 1485–1509 ===
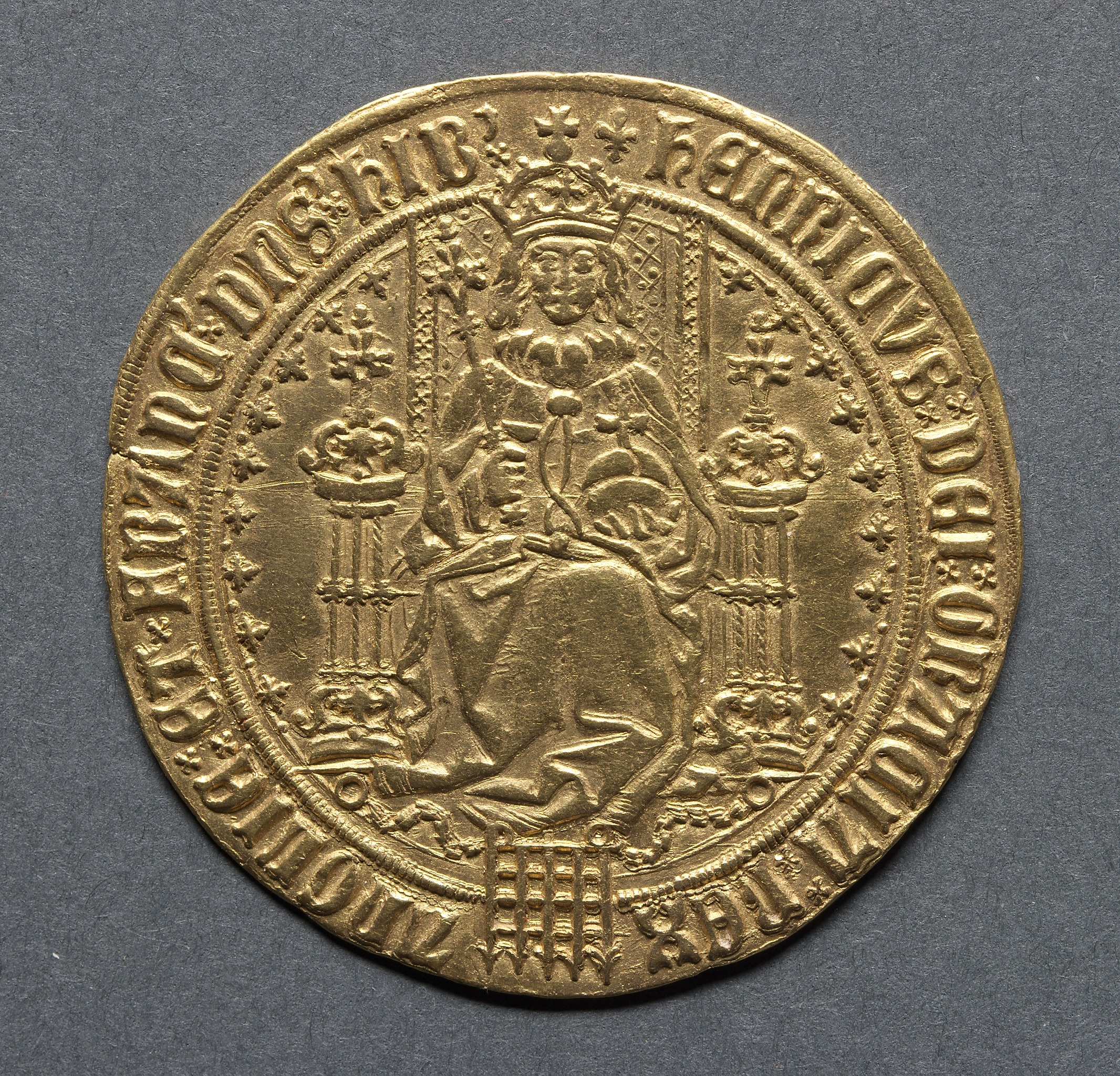
Coin minted under Henry VII

Henry VII, founder of the House of Tudor, became King of England by defeating King Richard III at the Battle of Bosworth Field, the culmination of the Wars of the Roses. Henry engaged in a number of administrative, economic and diplomatic initiatives. He spent a significant part of his reign dedicated to stabilizing the economy of England. He created a new system of royal finance that served as the foundation of the modern English revenue system. Henry's fiscal policies were viewed as oppressive by the wealthy and focused on the enforcement of the existing laws against noblemen and religious leaders, not the poor. The wealthy were forced to abide by decisions of his special royal council, the Court of Star Chamber. Through the Court of Star Chamber, English laws could be manipulated to the king's advantage as a way to avoid feudal anarchy. He returned lands that had been distributed to the nobility during the prior reigns and brought the Duchies of Cornwall and Lancaster under royal control. Such actions generated significant funds for the crown. Under the reign of Henry VII, the crown's income tripled and a balanced budget was achieved, paving the way for an emerging middle class in England. He paid very close attention to detail and, instead of spending lavishly, concentrated on raising new revenues. His new taxes were unpopular, and when Henry VIII succeeded him, he executed Henry VII's two most hated tax collectors Edmund Dudley and Richard Empson.

Henry VII engaged in a number of administrative and diplomatic initiatives. He transitioned from the Plantagenets policy of acquiring and holding French territories to a more strategic, defensive anglocentric approach. He established an alliance with Spain through the marriage of his son Arthur to Catherine of Aragon. This marriage propelled England to the forefront of European politics and played a role in the success of the Protestant Reformation.

=== Henry VIII: 1509–1547 ===
Henry VIII, energetic, militaristic and headstrong, remains one of the most visible kings of England, primarily because of his six marriages, all of which were designed to produce a male heir, and his heavy retribution in executing many top officials and aristocrats. In foreign-policy, he focused on fighting France—with minimal success—and had to deal with Scotland, Spain, and the Holy Roman Empire, often with military mobilisation or actual highly expensive warfare that led to high taxes. The chief military success came over Scotland.

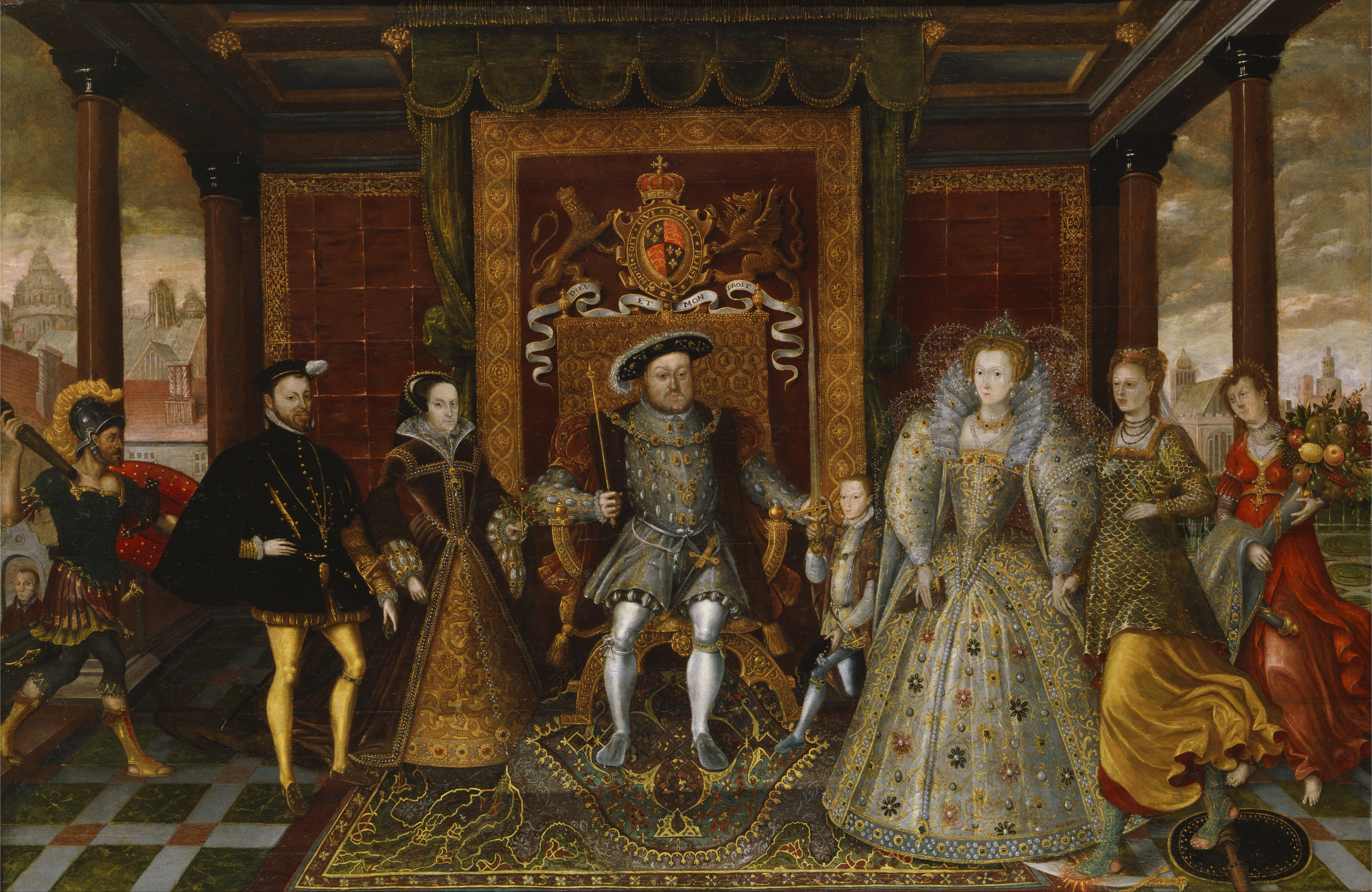
An allegory of the Tudor succession.

The main policy development was Henry's taking full control of the Church of England. This followed from his break from Rome, which was caused by the refusal of the Pope to annul his original marriage. Henry thereby introduced a very mild variation of the Protestant Reformation. There were two main aspects. First Henry rejected the Pope as the head of the Church in England, insisting that national sovereignty required the Absolute supremacy of the king. Henry worked closely with Parliament in passing a series of laws that implemented the break. Englishmen could no longer appeal to Rome. All the decisions were to be made in England, ultimately by the King himself, and in practice by top aides such as Cardinal Wolsey and Thomas Cromwell. Parliament proved highly supportive, with little dissent. The decisive moves came with the Act of Supremacy in 1534 that made the king the protector and only supreme head of the church and clergy of England.

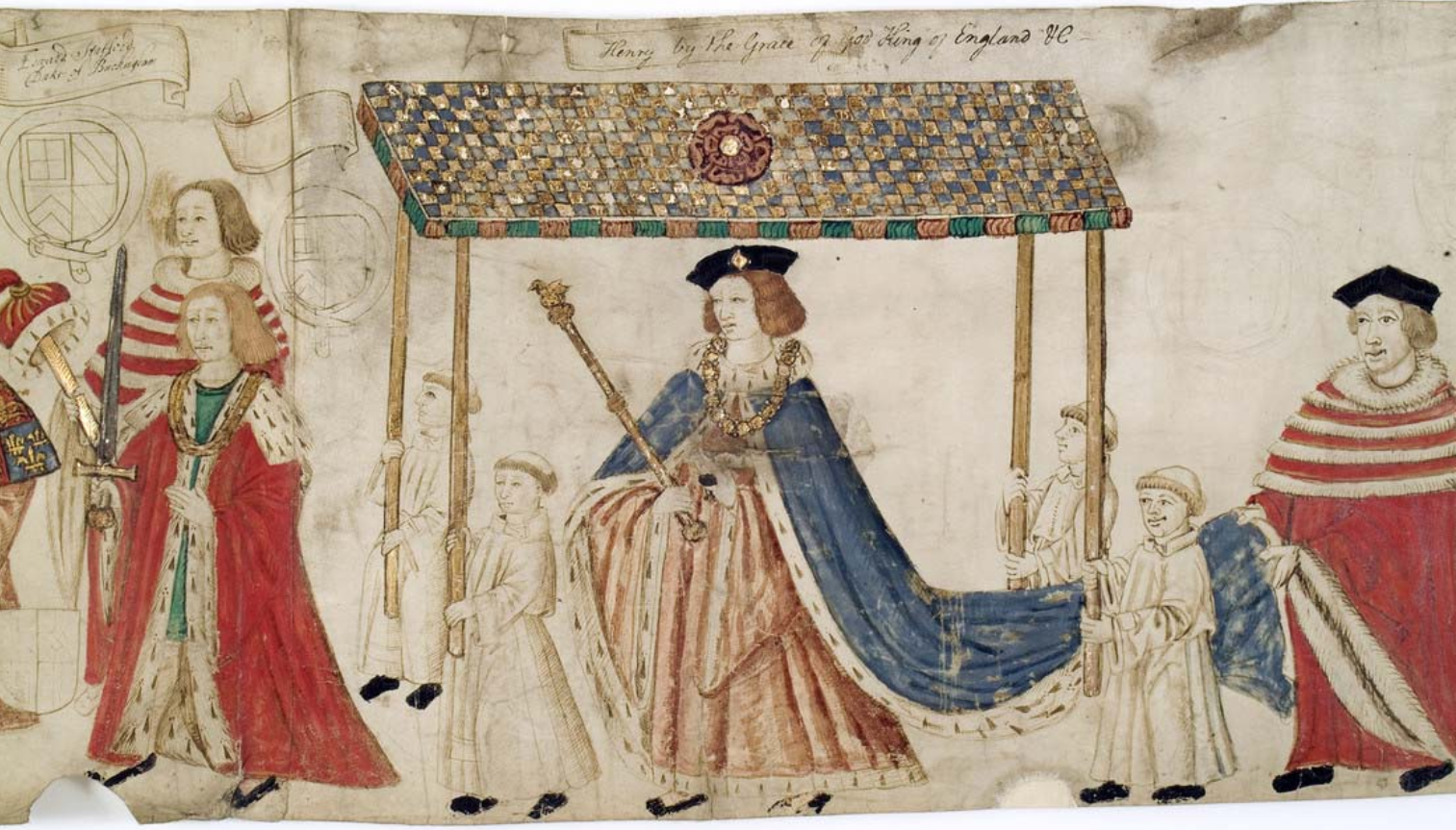
King Henry VIII aged 21, on his way to open Parliament on 4 February 1512

After Henry imposed a heavy fine on the bishops, they nearly all complied. The laws of treason were greatly strengthened so that verbal dissent alone was treasonous. There were some short-lived popular rebellions that were quickly suppressed. The league level in terms of the aristocracy and the Church was supportive. The highly visible main refusals came from Bishop Fisher and Chancellor Thomas More; they were both executed. Among the senior aristocrats, trouble came from the Pole family, which supported Reginald Pole who was in exile in continental Europe. Henry destroyed the rest of the family, executing its leaders, and seizing all its property. The second stage involved the seizure of the monasteries. The monasteries operating religious and charitable institutions were closed, the monks and nuns were pensioned off, and the valuable lands were sold to friends of the King, thereby producing a large, wealthy, gentry class that supported Henry. In terms of theology and ritual there was little change, as Henry wanted to keep most elements of Catholicism and detested the "heresies" of Martin Luther and the other reformers.

==== Father of the Royal Navy ====
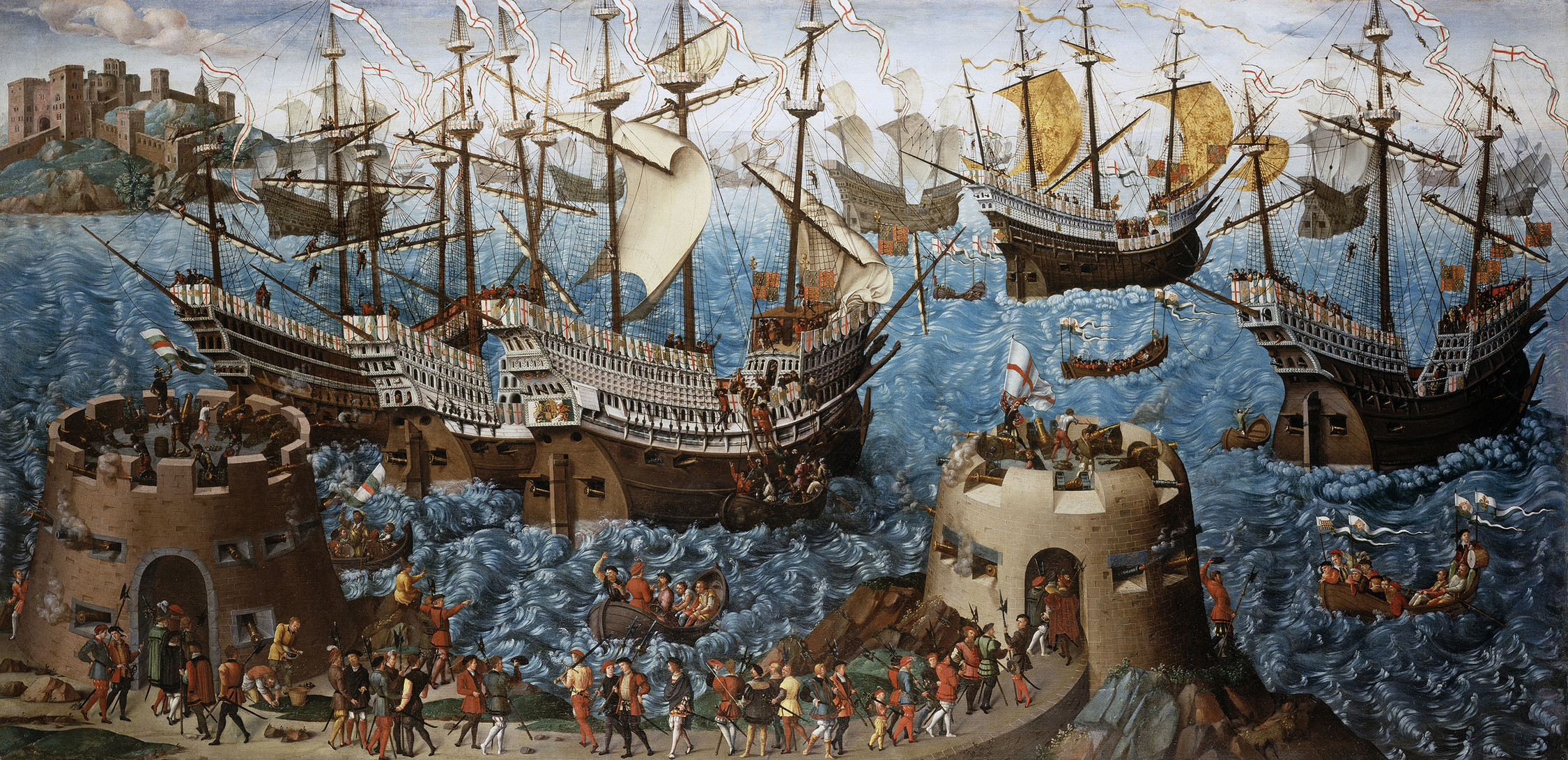
Henry VIII embarking at Dover. Dover Castle is depicted at top left.

Biographer J.J. Scarisbrick says that Henry deserved his traditional title of "Father of the English navy." It became his personal weapon. He inherited seven small warships from his father, and added two dozen more by 1514. In addition to those built in England, he bought up Italian and Hanseatic warships. By March 1513, he proudly watched his fleet sail down the Thames under command of Sir Edmund Howard. It was the most powerful naval force to date in English history: 24 ships led by the 1600 ton "Henry Imperial"; the fleet carried 5000 combat marines and 3000 sailors. It forced the outnumbered French fleet back to its ports, took control of the English Channel, and blockaded Brest.

Henry was the first king to organise the navy as a permanent force, with a permanent administrative and logistical structure, funded by tax revenue. His personal attention was concentrated on land, where he founded the royal dockyards, planted trees for shipbuilding, enacted laws for in land navigation, guarded the coastline with fortifications, set up a school for navigation and designated the roles of officers and sailors. He closely supervised the construction of all his warships and their guns, knowing their designs, speed, tonnage, armaments and battle tactics. He encouraged his naval architects, who perfected the Italian technique of mounting guns in the waist of the ship, thus lowering the centre of gravity and making it a better platform. He supervised the smallest details and enjoyed nothing more than presiding over the launching of a new ship. He drained his treasury on military and naval affairs, diverting the revenues from new taxes and the sales of monastery lands.

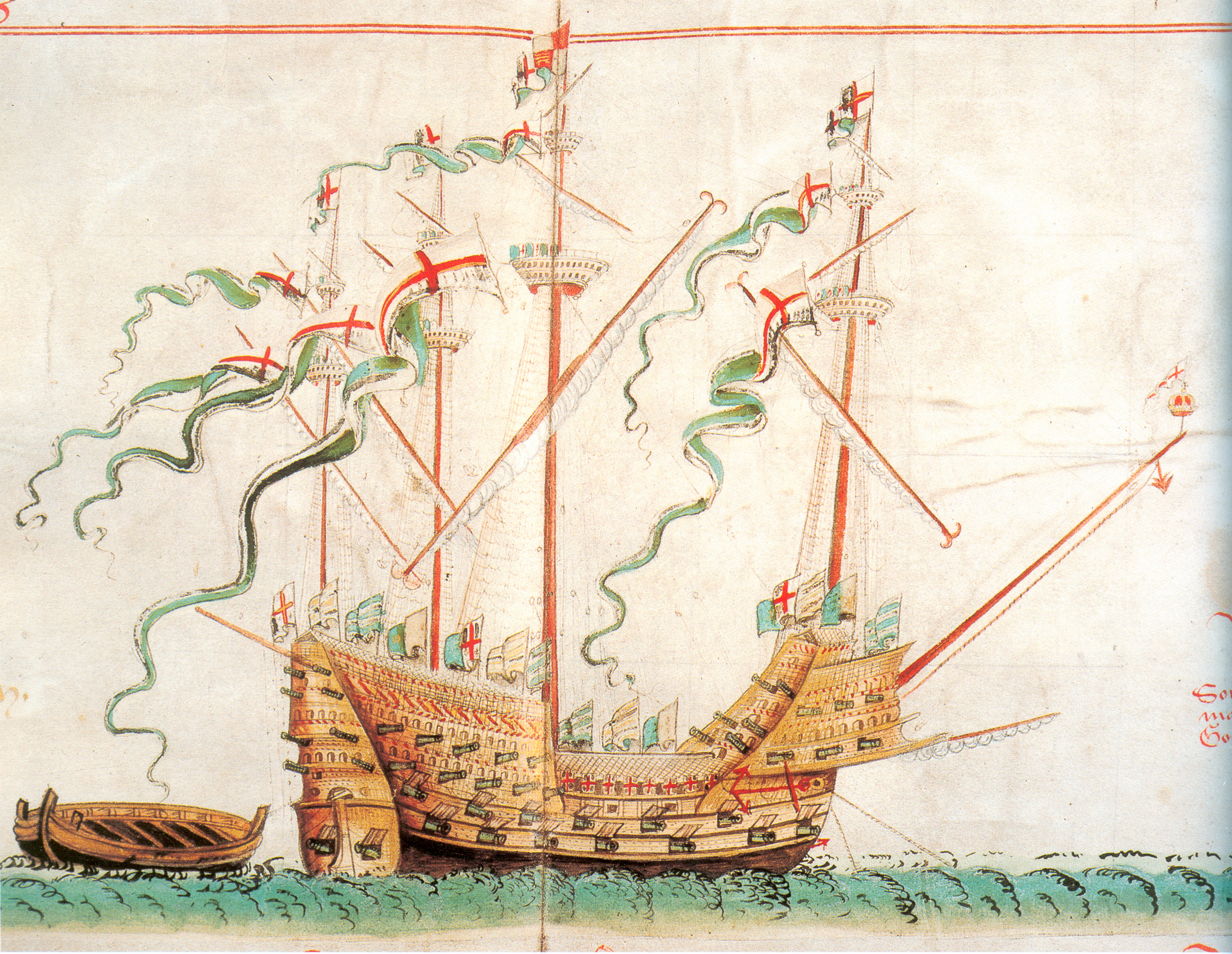
The Tudor navy carrack Henry Grace à Dieu. In her day she was the largest warship in the world.

Elton argues that Henry indeed built up the organisation and infrastructure of the Navy, but it was not a useful weapon for his style of warfare. It lacked a useful strategy. It did serve for defence against invasion, and for enhancing England's international prestige.

==== Cardinal Wolsey ====
Professor Sara Nair James says that between 1515 and 1529, Cardinal Thomas Wolsey, "would be the most powerful man in England except, possibly, for the king." Historian John Guy explains Wolsey's methods:

Only in the broadest respects was he [the king] taking independent decisions. ... It was Wolsey who almost invariably calculated the available options and ranked them for royal consideration; who established the parameters of each successive debate; who controlled the flow of official information; who selected the king's secretaries, middle-ranked officials, and JPs; and who promulgated decisions himself had largely shaped, if not strictly taken.

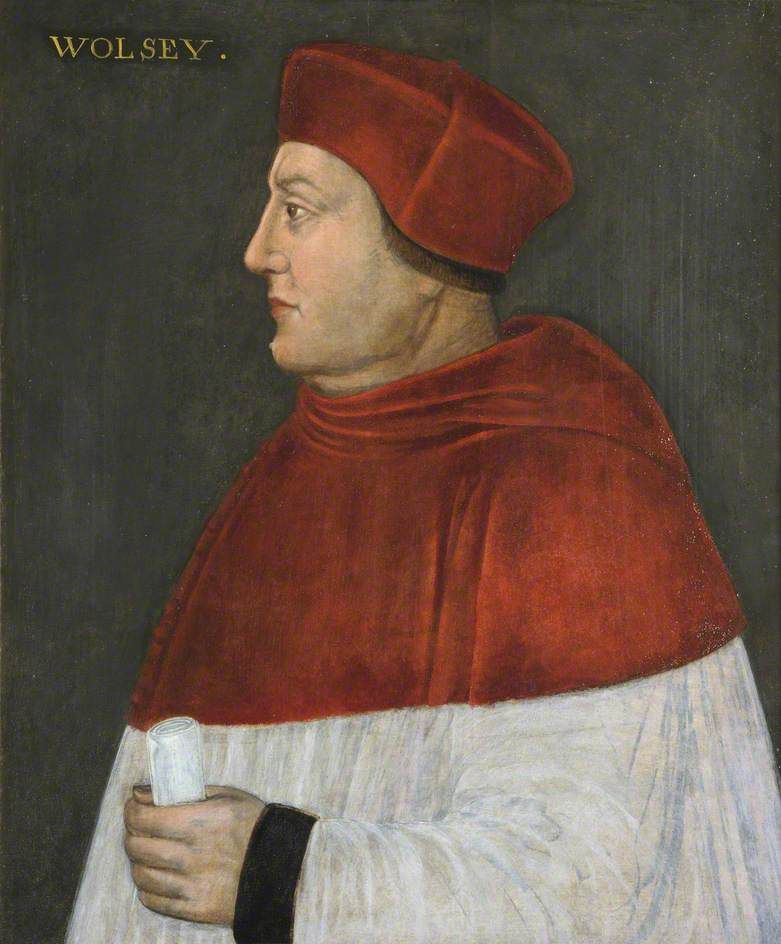
Cardinal Thomas Wolsey.

Operating with the firm support of the king, and with special powers over the church given by the Pope, Wolsey dominated civic affairs, administration, the law, the church, and foreign-policy. He was amazingly energetic and far-reaching. In terms of achievements, he built a great fortune for himself, and was a major benefactor of arts, humanities and education. Wolsey loved to display his wealth: he ate well, dressed magnificently, processed through the streets of London pompously, and built two great palaces, York Place in London and Hampton Court up the Thames Valley, which outshone anything in the King's possession. He projected numerous reforms, but in the end English government had not changed much. For all the promise, there was very little achievement of note. From the king's perspective, his greatest failure was an inability to get a divorce when Henry VIII needed a new wife to give him a son who would be the undisputed heir to the throne. Historians agree that Wolsey was a disappointment. In the end, he conspired with Henry's enemies, and died of natural causes before he could be beheaded.

==== Thomas Cromwell ====
Historian Geoffrey Elton argued that Thomas Cromwell, who was Henry VIII's chief minister from 1532 to 1540, not only removed control of the Church of England from the hands of the Pope, but transformed England with an unprecedented modern, bureaucratic government. Cromwell (1485–1540) replaced medieval government-as-household-management. Cromwell introduced reforms into the administration that delineated the King's household from the state and created a modern administration. He injected Tudor power into the darker corners of the realm and radically altered the role of the Parliament of England. This transition happened in the 1530s, Elton argued, and must be regarded as part of a planned revolution. Elton's point was that before Cromwell the realm could be viewed as the King's private estate writ large, where most administration was done by the King's household servants rather than separate state offices. By masterminding these reforms, Cromwell laid the foundations of England's future stability and success. Cromwell's luck ran out when he picked the wrong bride for the King; he was beheaded for treason. More recently historians have emphasised that the king and others played powerful roles as well.

==== Dissolution of the monasteries: 1536–1545 ====
The king had an annual income of about £100,000, but he needed much more in order to suppress rebellions and finance his foreign adventures. In 1533, for example, military expenditures on the northern border cost £25,000, while the 1534 rebellion in Ireland cost £38,000. Suppressing the Pilgrimage of Grace cost £50,000, and the king's new palaces were expensive. Meanwhile, customs revenue was slipping. The Church had an annual revenue of about £300,000; a new tax of 10% was imposed which brought in about £30,000. To get even larger sums it was proposed to seize the lands owned by monasteries, some of which the monks farmed and most of which was leased to local gentry. Taking ownership meant the rents went to the king. Selling the land to the gentry at a bargain price brought in £1 million in one-time revenue and gave the gentry a stake in the administration. The clerical payments from First Fruits and Tenths, which previously went to the pope, now went to the king. Altogether, between 1536 and Henry's death, his government collected £1.3 million; this huge influx of money caused Cromwell to change the Crown's financial system to manage the money. He created a new department of state and a new official to collect the proceeds of the dissolution and the First Fruits and Tenths. The Court of Augmentations and number of departments meant a growing number of officials, which made the management of revenue a major activity. Cromwell's new system was highly efficient with far less corruption or secret payoffs or bribery than before. Its drawback was the multiplication of departments whose sole unifying agent was Cromwell; his fall caused confusion and uncertainty; the solution was even greater reliance on bureaucratic institutions and the new Privy Council.

==== Role of Winchester ====
In dramatic contrast to his father, Henry VIII spent heavily, in terms of military operations in Britain and in France, and in building a great network of palaces. How to pay for it remained a serious issue. The growing number of departments meant many new salaried bureaucrats. There were further financial and administrative difficulties in 1540–1558, aggravated by war, debasement, corruption and inefficiency, which were mainly caused by Somerset. After Cromwell's fall, William Paulet, 1st Marquess of Winchester, the Lord Treasurer, produced further reforms to simplify the arrangements, reforms which united most of the crown's finance under the exchequer. The courts of general surveyors and augmentations were fused into a new Court of Augmentations, and this was later absorbed into the exchequer along with the First Fruits and Tenths.

==== Impact of war ====
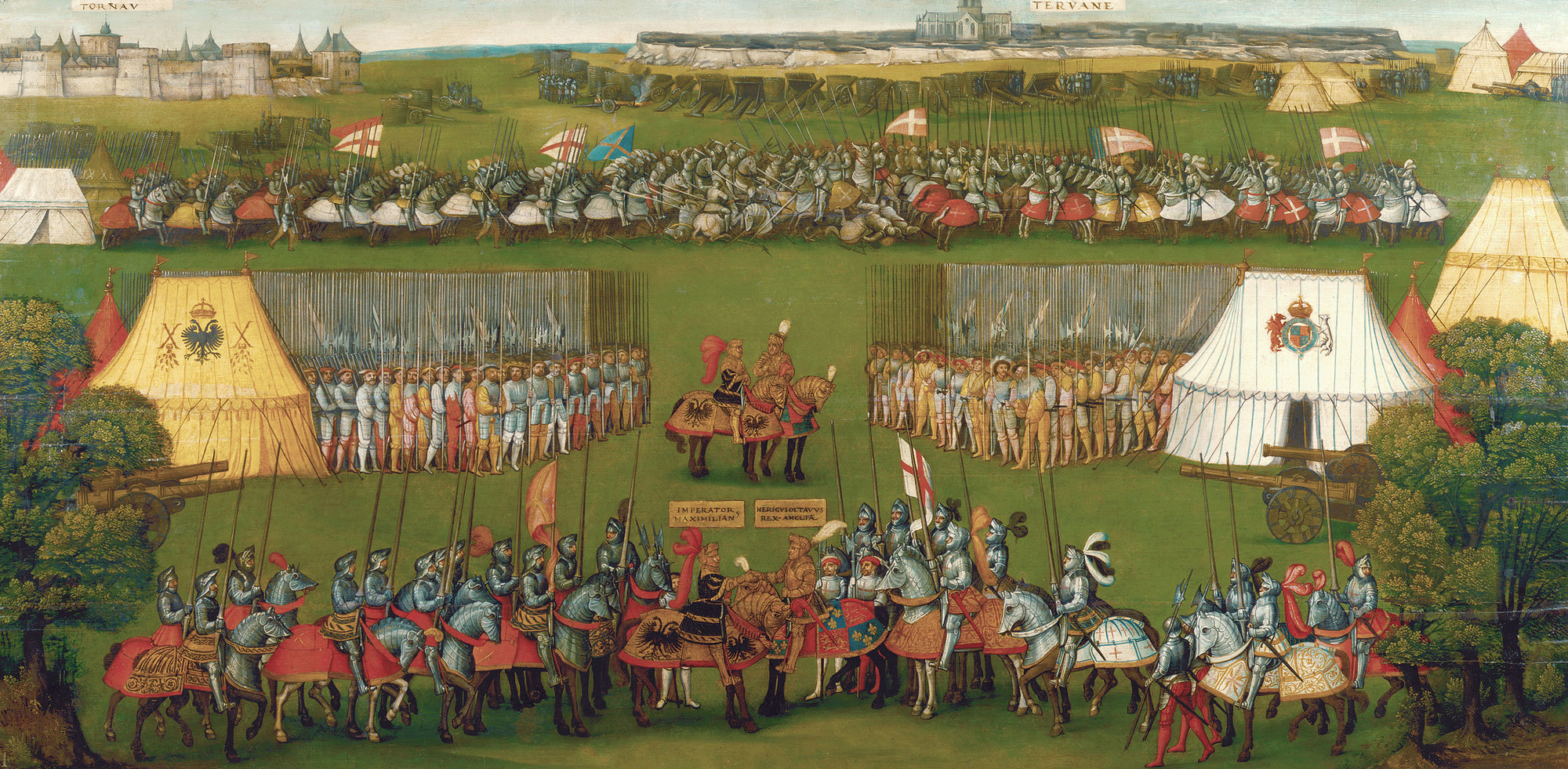
Flemish painting showing the encounter between Maximilian I, Holy Roman Emperor and Henry VIII. In the background is depicted the Battle of the Spurs against Louis XII of France.

At the end of his reign, Henry VII's peacetime income was about £113,000, of which customs on imports amounted to about £40,000. There was little debt, and he left his son a large treasury. Henry VIII spent heavily on luxuries, such as tapestries and palaces, but his peacetime budget was generally satisfactory. The heavy strain came from warfare, including building defences, building a Navy, suppressing insurrections, warring with Scotland, and engaging in very expensive continental warfare. Henry's Continental wars won him little glory or diplomatic influence, and no territory. Nevertheless, warfare 1511 to 1514 with three large expeditions and two smaller ones cost £912,000. The Boulogne campaign of 1544 cost £1,342,000 and the wars against Scotland £954,000; the naval wars cost £149,000 and large sums were spent to build and maintain inland and coastal fortifications. The total cost of war and defence between 1539 and 1547 was well over £2,000,000, although the accounting procedures were too primitive to give an accurate total. Adding it all up, approximately 35% came from taxes, 32% from selling land and monastery holdings, and 30% from debasing the coinage. The cost of war in the short reign of Edward VI was another £1,387,000.

After 1540, the Privy Coffers were responsible for 'secret affairs', in particular for the financing of war. The Royal Mint was used to generate revenue by debasing the coinage; the government's profit in 1547–1551 was £1.2 million. However, under the direction of regent Northumberland, Edward's wars were brought to an end. The mint no longer generated extra revenue after debasement was stopped in 1551.

=== Edward VI: 1547–1553 ===
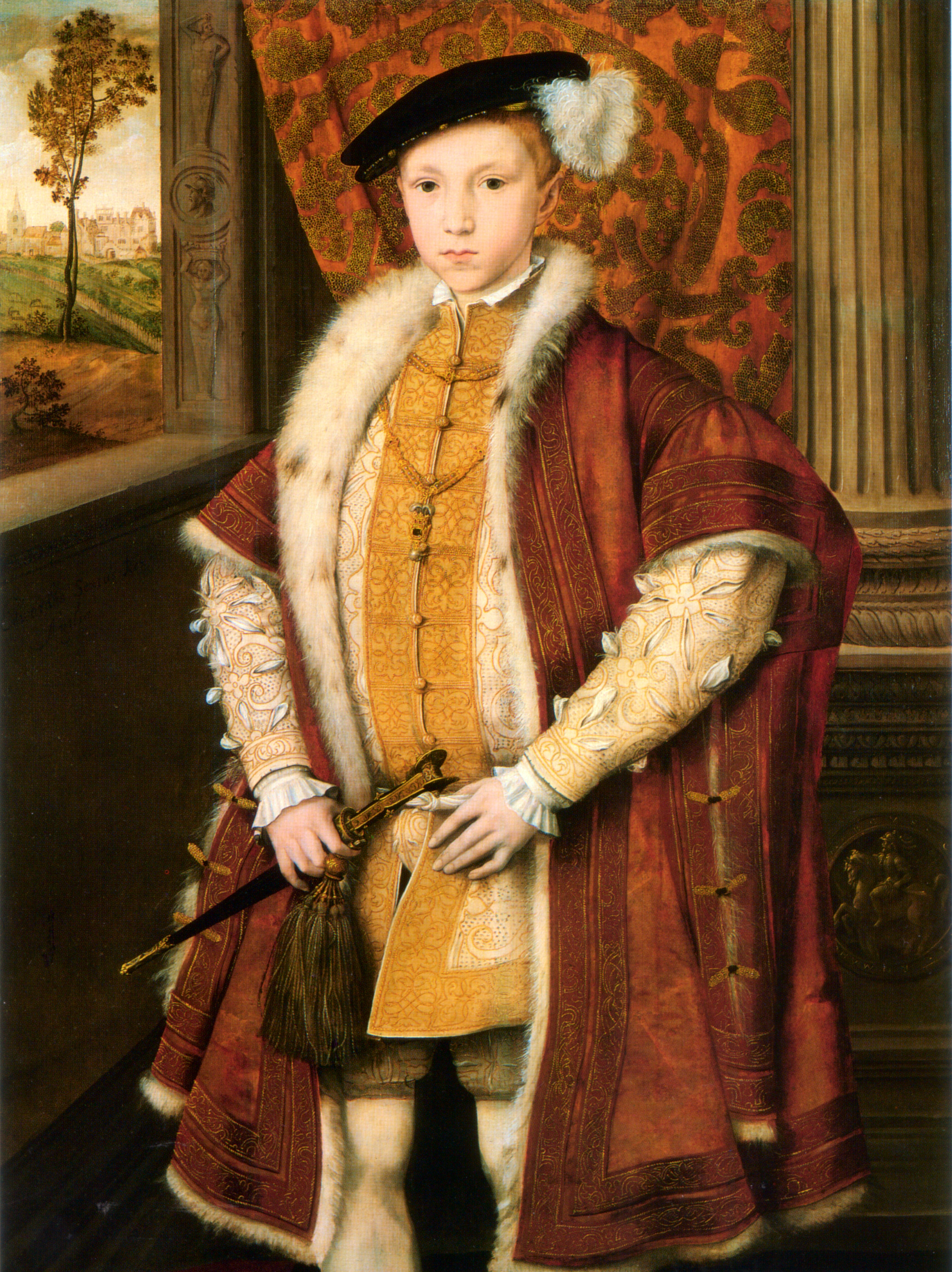
Edward VI in the Queen's Drawing Room, Windsor Castle.

Although Henry was only in his mid-50s, his health deteriorated rapidly in 1546. At the time the conservative faction, led by Bishop Stephen Gardiner and Thomas Howard, 3rd Duke of Norfolk that was oppose to religious reformation seemed to be in power, and was poised to take control of the regency of the nine-year-old boy who was heir to the throne. However, when the king died, the pro-reformation factions suddenly seized control of the new king, and of the Regency Council, under the leadership of Edward Seymour. Bishop Gardiner was discredited, and the Duke of Norfolk was imprisoned for all of the new king's reign.

The short reign of Edward VI marked the triumph of Protestantism in England. Somerset, the elder brother of the late Queen Jane Seymour (married to Henry VIII) and uncle to King Edward VI had a successful military career. When the boy king was crowned, Somerset became Lord Protector of the realm and in effect ruled England from 1547 to 1549. Seymour led expensive, inconclusive wars with Scotland. His religious policies angered Catholics. Purgatory was rejected so there was no more need for prayers to saints, relics, and statues, nor for masses for the dead. Some 2400 permanent endowments called chantries had been established that supported thousands of priests who celebrated masses for the dead, or operated schools or hospitals in order to earn grace for the soul in purgatory. The endowments were seized (by the king? Somerset?) in 1547. Historians have contrasted the efficiency of Somerset's takeover of power in 1547 with the subsequent ineptitude of his rule. By autumn 1549, his costly wars had lost momentum, the crown faced financial ruin, and riots and rebellions had broken out around the country. He was overthrown by his former ally John Dudley, 1st Duke of Northumberland.

Until recent decades, Somerset's reputation with historians was high, in view of his many proclamations that appeared to back the common people against a rapacious landowning class. In the early 20th century this line was taken by the influential A. F. Pollard, to be echoed by Edward VI's leading biographer W. K. Jordan. A more critical approach was initiated by M. L. Bush and Dale Hoak in the mid-1970s. Since then, Somerset has often been portrayed as an arrogant ruler, devoid of the political and administrative skills necessary for governing the Tudor state.

Dudley by contrast moved quickly after taking over an almost bankrupt administration in 1549. Working with his top aide William Cecil, Dudley ended the costly wars with France and Scotland and tackled finances in ways that led to some economic recovery. To prevent further uprisings he introduced countrywide policing, appointed Lords Lieutenants who were in close contact with London, and set up what amounted to a standing national army. Working closely with Thomas Cramner, the Archbishop of Canterbury, Dudley pursued an aggressively Protestant religious policy. They promoted radical reformers to high Church positions, with the Catholic bishops under attack. The use of the Book of Common Prayer became law in 1549; prayers were to be in English not Latin. The Mass was no longer to be celebrated, and preaching became the centerpiece of church services.

Purgatory, Protestantism declared, was a Catholic superstition that falsified the Scriptures. Prayers for the dead were useless because no one was actually in Purgatory. It followed that prayers to saints, veneration of relics, and adoration of statues were all useless superstitions that had to end. For centuries devout Englishman had created endowments called chantries designed as good works that generated grace to help them get out of purgatory after they died. Many chantries were altars or chapels inside churches, or endowments that supported thousands of priests who said Masses for the dead. In addition there were many schools and hospitals established as good works. In 1547 a new law closed down 2,374 chantries and seized their assets. Although the Act required the money to go to "charitable" ends and the "public good", most of it appears to have gone to friends of the Court. Historian A. G. Dickens has concluded:

To Catholic opinion, the problem set by these legal confiscations ... [was] the disappearance of a large clerical society from their midst, the silencing of masses, the rupture of both visible and spiritual ties, which over so many centuries have linked rude provincial man with a great world of the Faith. ... The Edwardian dissolution exerted its profounder effects in the field of religion. In large part it proved destructive, for while it helped to debar a revival of Catholic devotion it clearly contain elements which injured the reputation of Protestantism.

The new Protestant orthodoxy for the Church of England was expressed in the Forty-Two Articles of Faith in 1553. But when the king suddenly died, Dudley's last-minute efforts to make his daughter-in-law Lady Jane Grey the new sovereign failed after only nine days of her reign. Queen Mary took over and had him beheaded and had Jane Grey beheaded after Thomas Wyatt's Protestant rebellion against the marriage of the queen and Philip II of Spain less than a year later.

=== Mary I: 1553–1558 ===
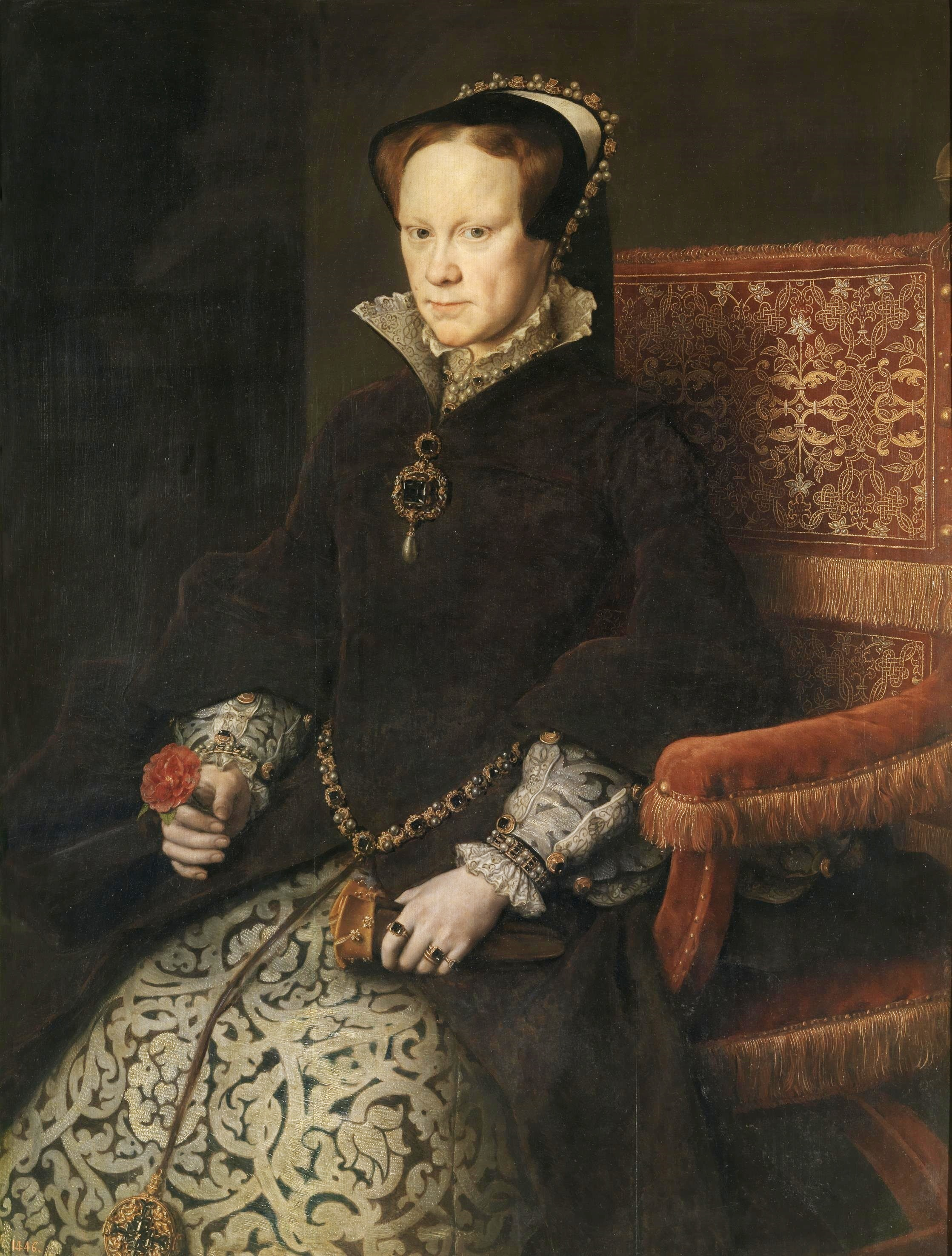
Mary I – Prado Museum, Madrid, Spain

Mary was the daughter of Henry VIII by Catherine of Aragon (the first wife); she closely identified with her Catholic, Spanish heritage. She was next in line for the throne. However, in 1553 as Edward VI lay dying, he and the Duke of Northumberland plotted to make his first cousin once removed, Lady Jane Grey, the new monarch. Northumberland wanted to keep control of the government, and promote Protestantism. Edward signed a devise to alter the succession, but that was not legal, for only Parliament could amend its own acts. Edward's Privy Council kept his death secret for three days to install Lady Jane, but Northumberland had neglected to take control of Princess Mary. She fled and organised a band of supporters, who proclaimed her Queen across the country. The Privy Council abandoned Northumberland, and proclaimed Mary to be the sovereign after nine days of the pretended Jane Grey. Queen Mary imprisoned Lady Jane and executed Northumberland.

Mary is remembered for her vigorous efforts to restore Roman Catholicism after Edward's short-lived crusade to minimise Catholicism in England. Protestant historians have long denigrated her reign, emphasising that in just five years she burned several hundred Protestants at the stake in the Marian persecutions. However, a historiographical revisionism since the 1980s has to some degree improved her reputation among scholars. Christopher Haigh's bold reappraisal of the religious history of Mary's reign painted the revival of religious festivities and a general satisfaction, if not enthusiasm, at the return of the old Catholic practices. Her re-establishment of Roman Catholicism was reversed by her younger half-sister and successor Elizabeth I.

Protestant writers at the time took a highly negative view, blasting her as "Bloody Mary". John Knox attacked her in his First Blast of the Trumpet against the Monstrous Regiment of Women (1558), and she was prominently vilified in Actes and Monuments (1563), by John Foxe. Foxe's book taught Protestants for centuries that Mary was a bloodthirsty tyrant. In the mid-20th century, H. F. M. Prescott attempted to redress the tradition that Mary was intolerant and authoritarian by writing more objectively, and scholarship since then has tended to view the older, simpler, partisan assessments of Mary with greater scepticism.

Haigh concluded that the "last years of Mary's reign were not a gruesome preparation for Protestant victory, but a continuing consolidation of Catholic strength." Catholic historians, such as John Lingard, argued Mary's policies failed not because they were wrong but because she had too short a reign to establish them. In other countries, the Catholic Counter-Reformation was spearheaded by Jesuit missionaries; Mary's chief religious advisor, Cardinal Pole, refused to allow the Jesuits in England. Spain was widely seen as the enemy, and her marriage to King Philip II of Spain was deeply unpopular, even though he had practically no role in English government and they had no children. The military loss of Calais to France was a bitter humiliation to English pride. Failed harvests increased public discontent. Although Mary's rule was ultimately ineffectual and unpopular, her innovations regarding fiscal reform, naval expansion, and colonial exploration were later lauded as Elizabethan accomplishments.

=== Elizabeth I: 1558–1603 ===
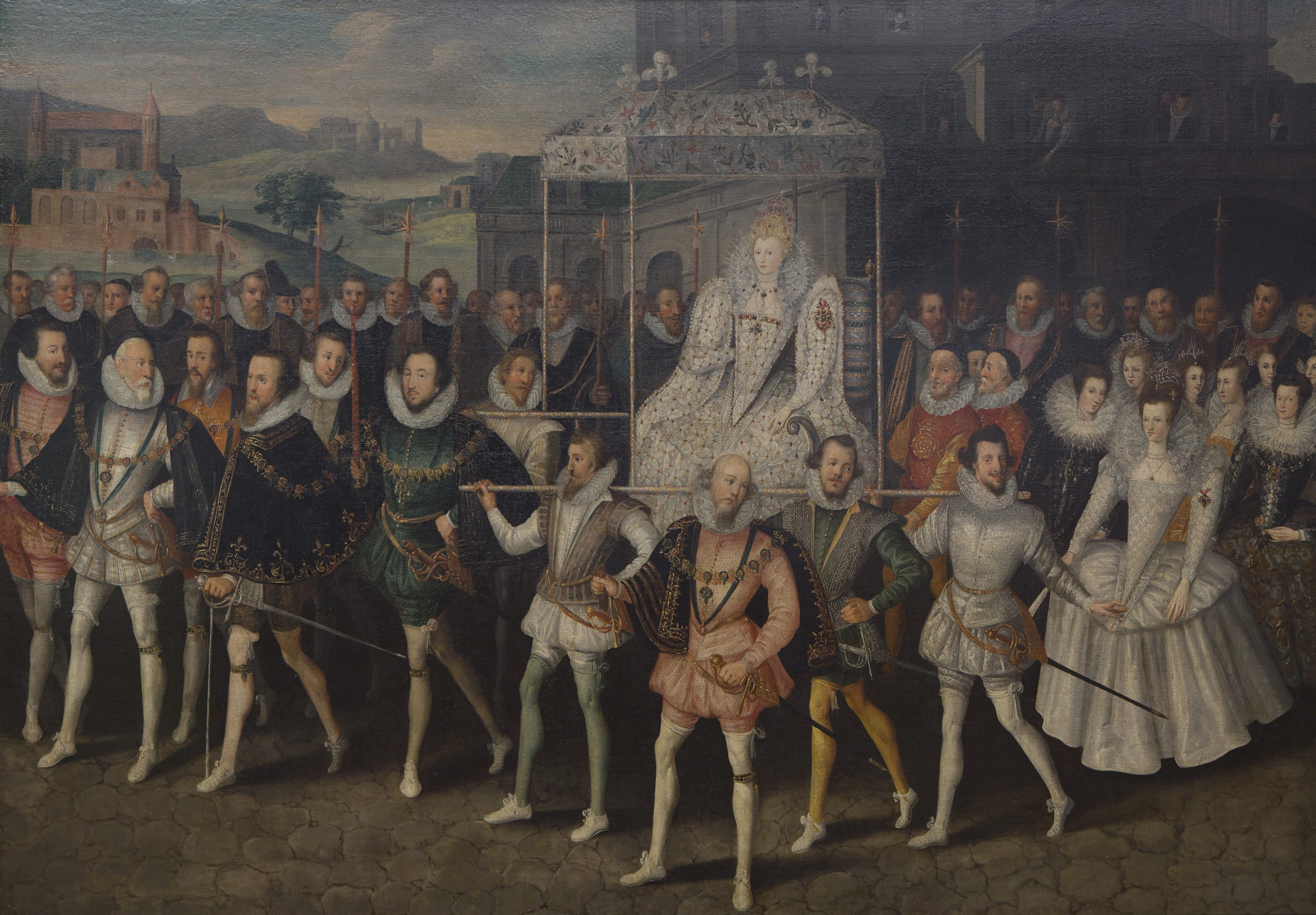
The Procession Picture, c. 1600, showing Elizabeth I borne along by her courtiers

Historians often depict Elizabeth's reign as the golden age in English history in terms of political, social and cultural development, and in comparison with Continental Europe. Calling her "Gloriana" and using the symbol of Britannia starting in 1572, marked the Elizabethan age as a renaissance that inspired national pride through classical ideals, international expansion, and naval triumph over the hated and feared Spanish.

Elizabeth's reign marks the decisive turning point in English religious history, as a predominantly Catholic nation at the beginning of her reign was predominantly Protestant by the end. Although Elizabeth executed 250 Catholic priests, she also executed some extreme Puritans, and on the whole she sought a moderately conservative position that mixed Royal control of the church (with no people role), combined with predominantly Catholic ritual, and a predominantly Calvinist theology.

==== Scotland and Mary, Queen of Scots ====
Mary, Queen of Scots (1542–1587) was a devout Catholic and next in line for the throne of England after Elizabeth. Her status became a major domestic and international issue for England. especially after the death of King James IV at the Battle of Flodden in 1513. The upshot was years of struggle for control of the throne, nominally held by the infant King James V (1512–1542, r. 1513–1542), until he came of age in 1528.

Mary of Guise (1515–1560) was a French woman close to the French throne. She ruled as the regent for her teenaged daughter Queen Mary, 1554–1560. The regent and her daughter were both strong proponents of Catholicism and attempted to suppress the rapid growth of Protestantism in Scotland. Mary of Guise was a strong opponent of Protestantism, and worked to maintain a close alliance between Scotland and France, called the Auld Alliance. In 1559 the Regent became alarmed that widespread Scottish hostility against French rule was strengthening the partisan cause, so she banned unauthorised preaching. But the fiery preacher John Knox sent Scotland aflame with his preaching, leading the coalition of powerful Scottish nobles, calling themselves the Lords of the Congregation raised the rebellion to overthrow the Catholic Church and seize its lands. The Lords appealed to Elizabeth for English help, but she played a very cautious hand. The 1559 treaty with France called for peace and she was unwilling to violate it, especially since England had no allies at the time. Supporting rebels against the lawful ruler violated Elizabeth's deeply held claims to the legitimacy of all royalty. On the other hand, a French victory in Scotland would establish a Catholic state on the northern border supported by a powerful French enemy. Elizabeth first sent money, then sent artillery, then sent a fleet that destroyed the French fleet in Scotland. Finally she sent 8,000 troops north. The death of Mary of Guise allowed England, France and Scotland to come to terms in the Treaty of Edinburgh in 1560, which had a far-reaching impact. France permanently withdrew all its forces from Scotland. It ensured the success of the Reformation in Scotland; it began a century of peace with France; it ended any threat of a Scottish invasion; and it paved the way for a union of the two kingdoms in 1603 when the Scottish king James VI inherited the English throne as James I and launched the Stuart era.

When the treaty was signed, Mary was in Paris as the wife of the French King Francis II. When he died in December 1560, she returned to Scotland the following year as Queen of Scotland. However, when Elizabeth refused to recognise her as the heir to the English throne, Mary rejected the Treaty of Edinburgh. She made an unfortunate marriage to Lord Darnley who mistreated her and murdered her Italian favourite David Rizzio. Darnley in turn was murdered by the Earl of Bothwell. He was acquitted of murder; she quickly married Bothwell. Most people at the time thought she was deeply involved in adultery or murder; historians have argued at length and are undecided. However rebellion broke out and the Protestant nobles defeated the Queen's forces in 1567. She was forced to abdicate in favour of her infant son James VI; she fled to England, where Elizabeth confined her in house arrest for 19 years. Mary engaged in numerous complex plots to assassinate Elizabeth and become queen herself. Finally Elizabeth caught her plotting the Babington Plot and had her executed in 1587.

==== Troubled later years: 1585–1603 ====
Elizabeth's final two decades saw mounting problems that were left for the Stuarts to solve after 1603. John Cramsie, in reviewing the recent scholarship in 2003, argues:

the period 1585–1603 is now recognised by scholars as distinctly more troubled than the first half of Elizabeth's long reign. Costly wars against Spain and the Irish, involvement in the Netherlands, socio-economic distress, and an authoritarian turn by the regime all cast a pall over Gloriana's final years, underpinning a weariness with the queen's rule and open criticism of her government and its failures.

Just three years into this period, England faced an attack by a formidable adversary, the Spanish Armada. Despite being greatly outnumbered, the English Navy was able to successfully defeat the Spanish, causing them to retreat. The result was a boost at home. As put in The Image of Elizabeth I in Early Modern Spain:

In England, the threat of an invasion fomented both English patriotism and hatred against Spain and Rome, demonstrated by at least twenty-four popular songs about "the Invincible" and other anti-Spanish ballads. The failed invasion of 1588 would strengthen English determination and although there was another Armada in 1596 and a third the following year, along with more support for the Catholics in Ireland, all these failed

Elizabeth remained a strong leader, but almost all of her earlier advisers had died or retired. Robert Cecil (1563–1612) took over the role of leading advisor long held by his father Lord Burghley. Robert Devereux, 2nd Earl of Essex (1567–1601) was her most prominent general, a role previously held by his stepfather Robert Dudley, who was the love of Elizabeth's life; and the adventurer/historian Sir Walter Raleigh (1552–1618) was a new face on the scene. The three new men formed a triangle of interlocking and opposing forces that was hard to break into. The first vacancy came in 1601, when Devereux was executed for attempting to take the Queen prisoner and seize power. After Elizabeth died the new king kept on Cecil as his chief advisor, and beheaded Raleigh.

== Popular uprisings ==
Numerous popular uprisings occurred; all suppressed by royal authorities. The largest were:

- The largest and most serious was the Pilgrimage of Grace. It disrupted the North of England in 1536 protesting the religious reforms of Henry VIII, his dissolution of the monasteries and the policies of the King's chief minister, Thomas Cromwell, as well as other specific political, social and economic grievances.
- The Prayer Book Rebellion or "Western Rising" was a popular revolt in Devon and Cornwall in 1549. The Royal Court introduced the Book of Common Prayer, which was based on Protestant theology and the exclusive use of English. The change was widely unpopular – particularly in areas of still firmly Catholic religious loyalty, and in Cornwall where standard English was not popular.
- Kett's Rebellion began in 1549 in Norfolk; it started as a demonstration against enclosures of common land. The instigator, Robert Kett, was executed for treason.
- Wyatt's rebellion in 1554 against Queen Mary I's determination to marry Philip of Spain and named after Thomas Wyatt, one of its leaders.
- The Rising of the North or "Northern Rebellion" of 1569–70 was a failed attempt by Catholic nobles from Northern England to depose Queen Elizabeth I of England and replace her with Mary, Queen of Scots. It originated from bitter political factionalism in the royal Privy Council. The extension of Tudor authority in northern England caused discontent among the aristocracy and gentry, as the new Protestant bishop tried to recover former church lands and alienated their new owners. Local Catholic elements were a large fraction of the population and resented the destruction of the rituals and practices. When the Royal army approached, the leadership disbanded their forces and fled to Scotland. A few leaders were executed, but many of the gentry saved their lives by handing over their lands to Queen Elizabeth.

== Local government ==
The main officials of the local government operated at the county level (also called "shire") were the sheriff and the Lord Lieutenant. The power of the sheriff had declined since medieval days, but the position was still very prestigious. A sheriff was appointed for a one-year term, with no renewal, by the Privy Council. He was paid many small fees, but they probably did not meet the sheriff's expenses in terms of hospitality and hiring his under-sheriffs and bailiffs. The sheriff held court every month to deal with civil and criminal cases. He supervised elections, ran the local jail and meted out punishments. His subordinates provided staffing for the county's justices of the peace.

The Lord Lieutenant was a new office created by Henry VIII to represent the royal power in each county. He was a person with good enough connections at court to be selected by the sovereign and served at the monarch's pleasure, often for decades. He had limited powers of direct control, so successful Lords Lieutenant worked with deputy lieutenants and dealt with the gentry through compromise, consensus, and the inclusion of opposing factions. He was in charge of mobilising the militia if necessary for defence, or to assist the monarch in military operations. In Yorkshire in 1588, the Lord Lieutenant was the Earl of Huntington, who urgently needed to prepare defences in the face of the threatened invasion from the Spanish Armada. The Queen's Privy Council urgently called upon him to mobilise the militia, and report on the availability of men and horses. Huntington's challenge was to overcome the reluctance of many militia men, the shortages of arms, training mishaps, and jealousy among the gentry as to who would command which unit. Despite Huntingdon's last-minute efforts, the mobilisation of 1588 revealed a reluctant society that only grudgingly answered the call to arms. The Armada never landed troops, and the militia were not actually used. During the civil wars of the mid-17th century, the Lord Lieutenant played an even more important role in mobilising his county either for King Charles I or for Parliament.

The day-to-day business of local government was in the hands of several dozen justices of the peace (JPs) in each county. They handled routine police administrative functions, and were paid through a modest level of fees. A JP's duties involved a great deal of paperwork – primarily in Latin – and attracted a surprisingly strong cast of candidates. For example, The 55 JPs in Devonshire holding office in 1592 included:

Sir Francis Drake, Sir Ferdinando Gorges, Gilberts, Carews, Seymours, Courtenays, and other names prominent among the men who laid the foundations of the maritime greatness of England and of the existence of America. Of the fifty-five, twenty-eight were at one time or another high-sheriffs of the county, twenty more were then, or became afterwards, knights, six sat in the House of Commons, and three in the House of Lords.

Other local officials included constables, church-wardens, mayors, and city aldermen.

== Social history ==
The cultural achievements of the Elizabethan era have long attracted scholars, and since the 1960s they have conducted intensive research on the social history of England. Main subjects within Tudor social history includes courtship and marriage, the food they consumed and the clothes they wore. Such research has debunked the common misconception that Tudor elites were unclean. While Elizabethans still adhered to Humorism, people were aware of taking care of their cleanliness, numerous writers of the period penned daily cleaning regimes and medical texts. Baths were taken to purify the body, and oral hygiene was practiced. While plague was relatively common, no fewer than 23 medical treatises were written on the subject, along with hundreds of recipes for medicines.

British historian Miranda Kaufmann researched the lives of 10 of the around 360 recorded persons of Black African heritage, the majority of whom lived out their lives as free persons, living in England or otherwise a part of Tudor English society between 1500 and 1640, showing some of the first recorded evidence of Black British people after the Roman period.

Jews, mainly Marranos from Portugal or Spain fleeing persecution from the Inquisition began developing a small community in London during this time period. Notably, this was not the first written record of Jews in England which begins around the 1070s, but it was a new wave of migration and community development in England. Hector Nunez and Roderigo Lopez were both Jews and leading physicians during 1570s and 1580s Elizabethan England. Lopez's believed involvement in a plot to poison Elizabeth I may have had a long-running effect on shaping antisemitic views in the United Kingdom.

The first written records of the Romani people in Scotland begin in 1505 and in England around 1513 or 1514. First believed to come from 'little Egypt', an English exonym given to an area around part of the Peloponnese peninsula in what is now modern-day Greece, the people were first called "Egyptians" in literature and from which the word "Gypsy" is derived. Discriminatory laws were passed in response to their arrival, including the Egyptians Act 1530 and the Egyptians Act 1554.

== Cultural and scientific history ==
In music, William Byrd (1539–1623) was an influential Elizabethan composer, mainly known for religious music. John Bull (1562–1628) was a leading organist and John Dowland (1563–1626) excelled in lute compositions. The English Madrigal School flourished, influenced by Italian models, producing popular a cappella compositions.

Many foreign-trained artists contributed to Tudor Art while working for the court, such as Marcus Gheeraerts the Younger and John de Critz the Elder. While Lucas Horenbout and his sister Susannah worked for Henry VIII, Lucas would go on to influence Hans Holbein the Younger, the era's greatest portraitist. Also Levina Teerlinc, a miniaturist who worked in the court later taught Nicholas Hilliard, who became the top limner of the period.

Scientific progress was driven not only by universities or royal patronage, but also by craftsmen, merchants and adventurers, marking a shift toward practical knowledge and exploration, exemplified by Francis Drake's circumnavigation around the world or Frobisher and Gilbert's attempt to cross the Northwest Passage. Major figures of the period who advanced practical knowledge include Francis Bacon, John Dee, Thomas Digges and Thomas Harriot.

== Tudor myth ==
The Tudor myth is a particular tradition in English history, historiography, and literature that presents the period of the 15th century, including the Wars of the Roses, as a dark age of anarchy and bloodshed, and sees the Tudor period of the 16th century as a golden age of peace, law, order, and prosperity.

== Monarchs ==
The House of Tudor produced five monarchs who ruled during this reign. Occasionally listed is Lady Jane Grey, sometimes known as the 'Nine Days' Queen' for the shortness of her de facto reign.

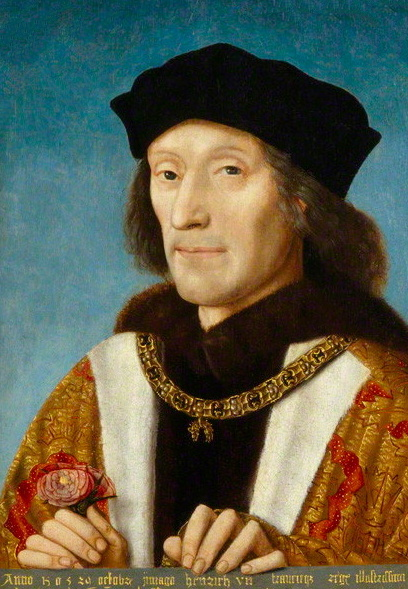
Henry VII
(1485–1509)

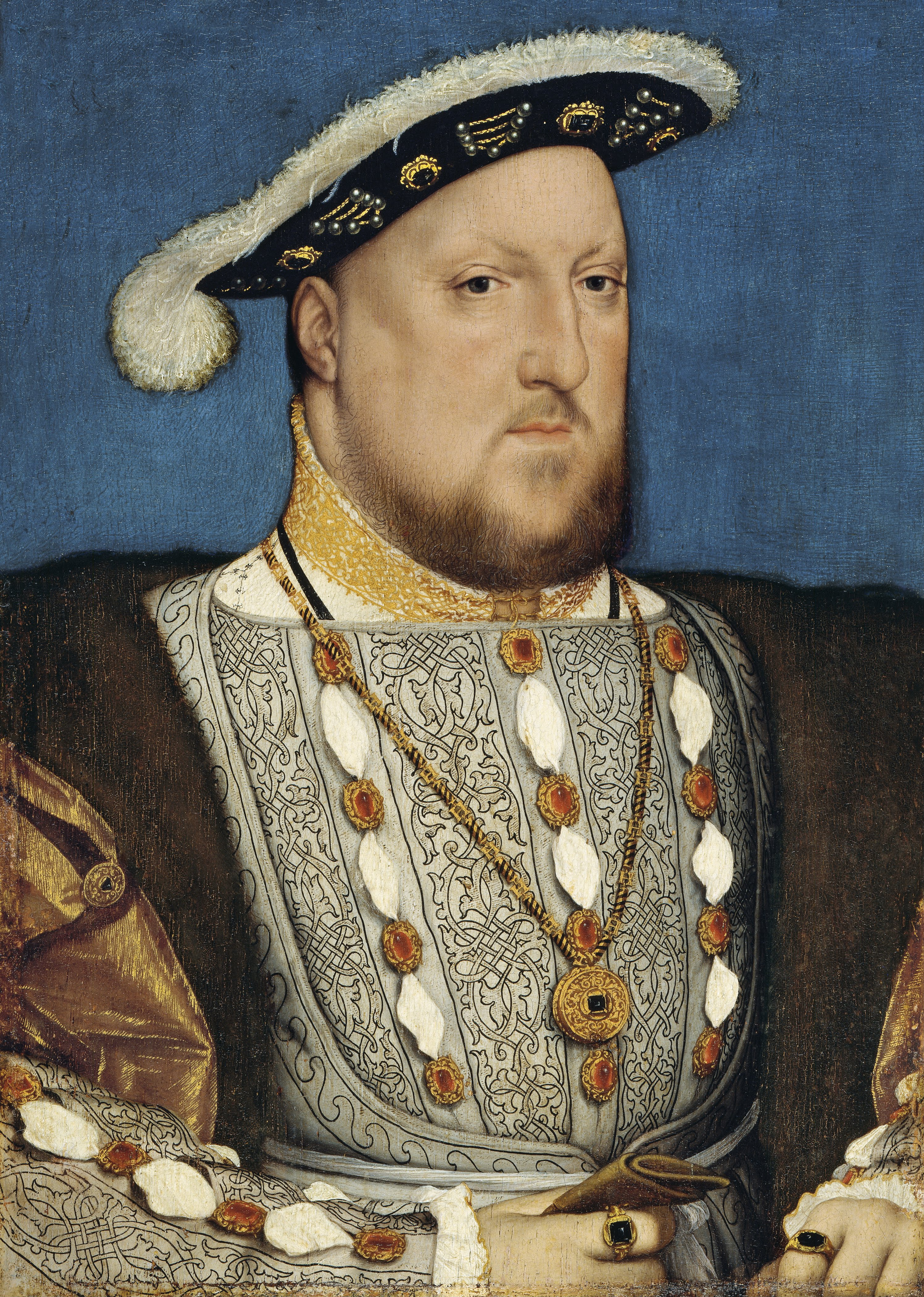
Henry VIII
(1509–1547)

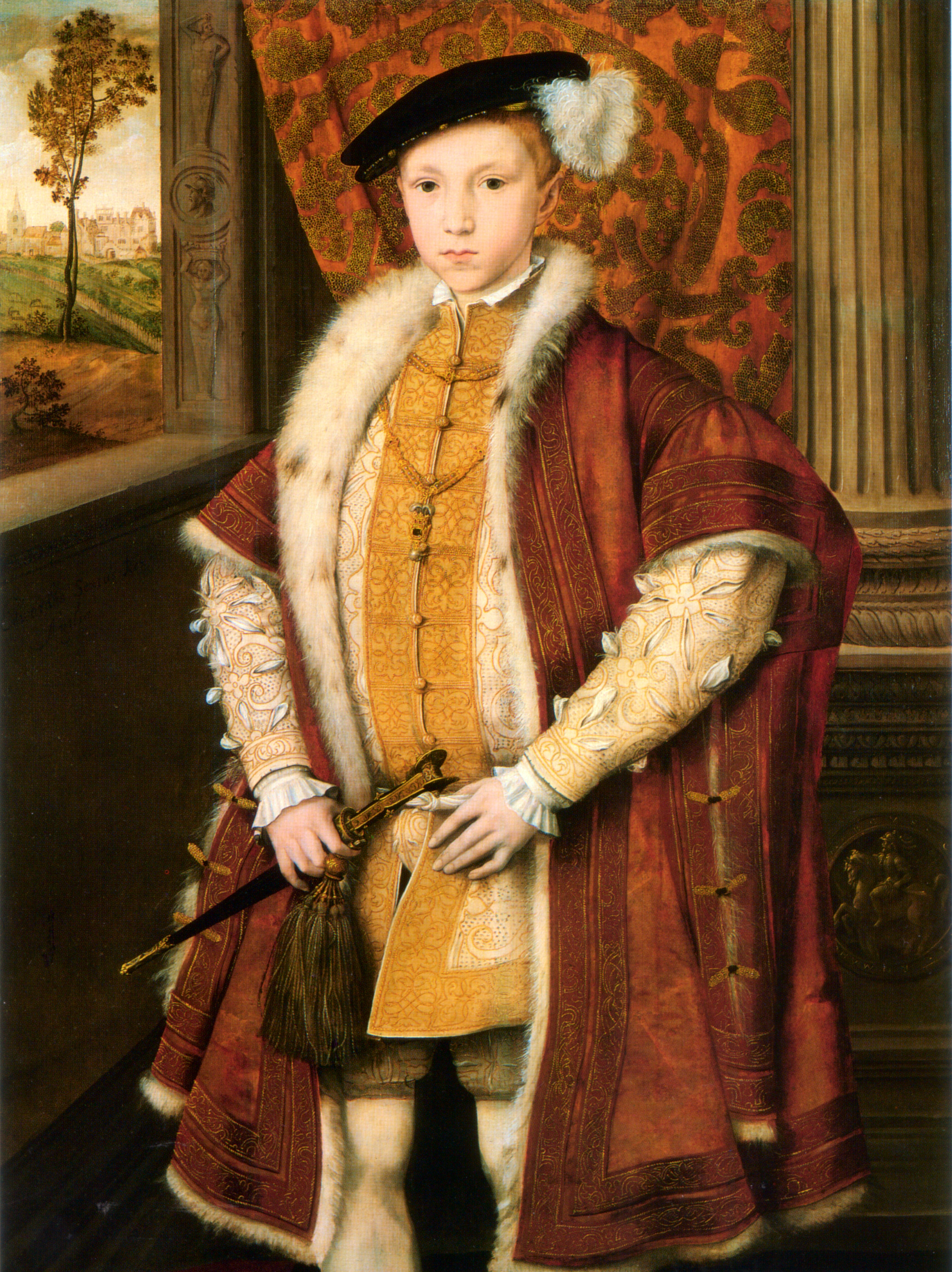
Edward VI
(1547–1553)

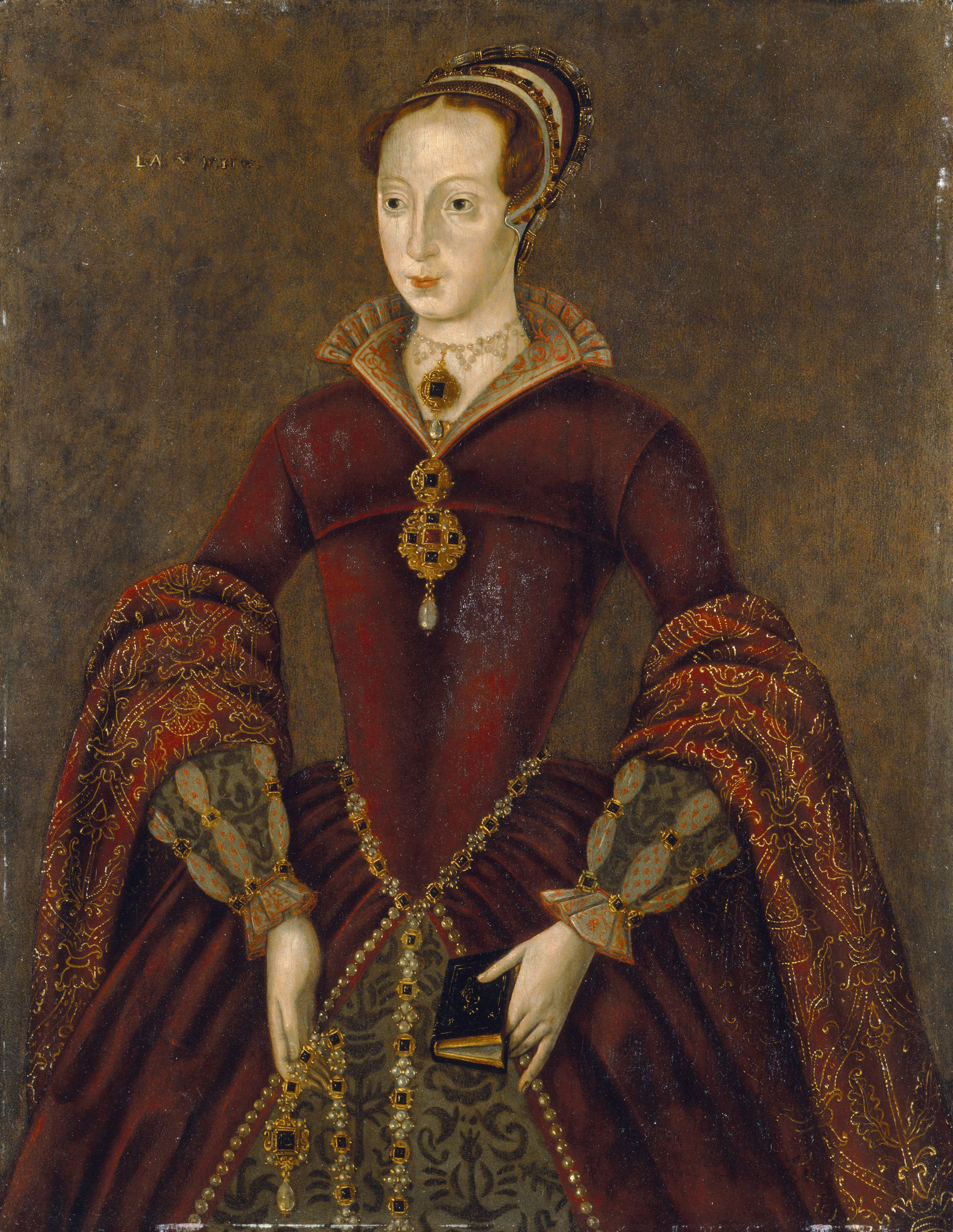
Lady Jane Grey (1553)

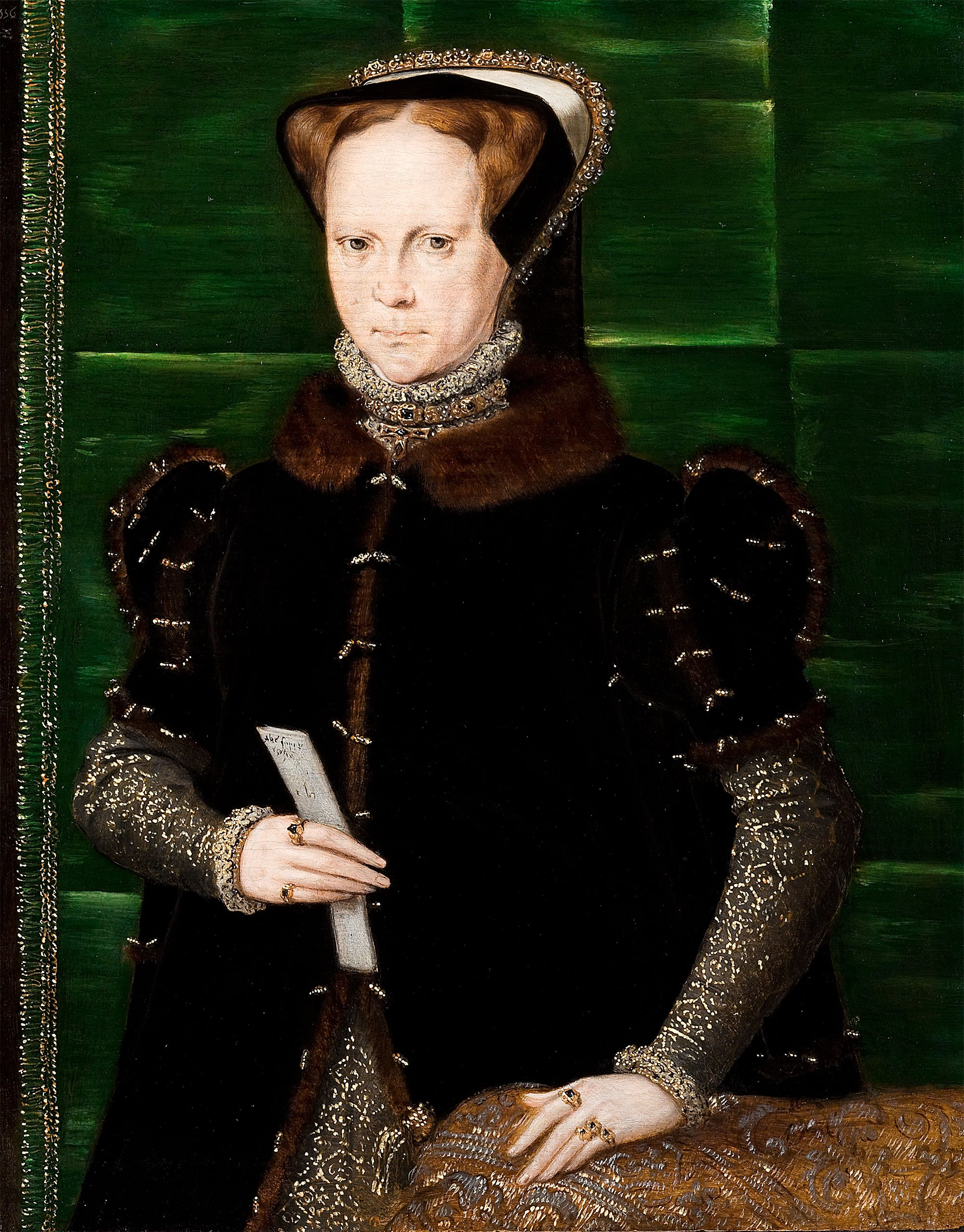
Mary I
(1553–1558)

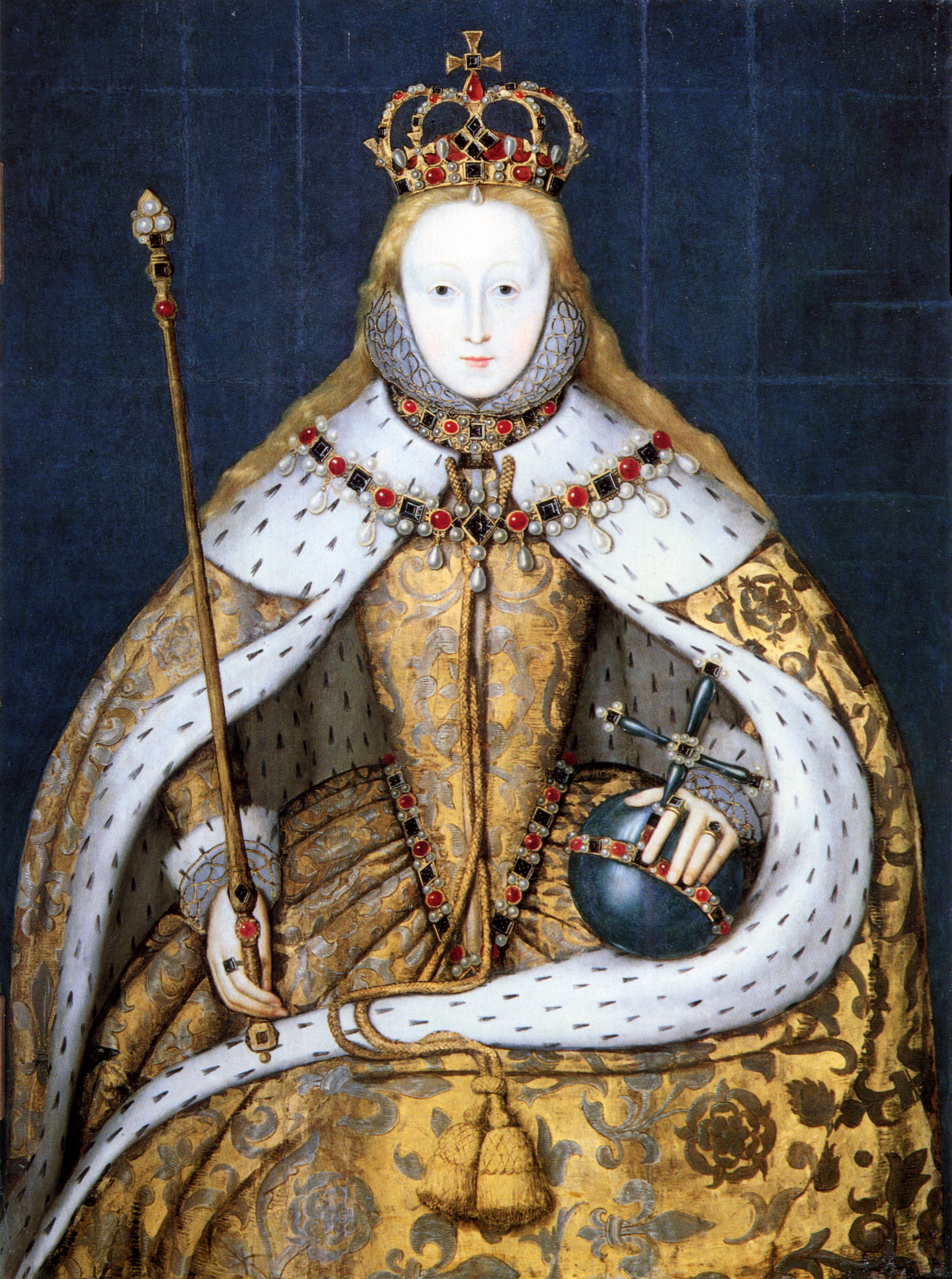
Elizabeth I
(1558–1603)

== See also ==
- Early modern Britain including the Stuart period from 1603 to 1714
- English Reformation
- Tudor architecture
- Tudor navy
- Tudor Revival architecture
- Tudor rose

Royal house House of Tudor
Preceded by House of York	Royal house of the Kingdom of England; 1485–1603	Succeeded by House of Stuart
