= Courtship and marriage in Tudor England =

Courtship and marriage in Tudor England (1485–1603) marked the legal rite of passage for individuals as it was considered the transition from youth to adulthood. It was an affair that often involved not only the man and woman in courtship but their parents and families as well. While the lower class had more freedom to choose their spouse, the middle and higher classes often searched for ways to build upon a family's wealth, to elevate a family's position within society, or to secure an alliance between families.

== Social and economic considerations ==
=== Higher classes ===
The financial and political facets marriage pertained were the key considerations in choosing a spouse for higher classes. It was a customary practice for noble families to sign contracts which betrothed their children in advance. This ensures a suitable match, which allowed for strategic advancements in society. However, these negotiations for marriage were not done in isolation. It was a matter of wider concern that involved the collective decisions of the family, kin and community. This was due to the concept of lineage and preservation of status, which emphasized increasing and transmitting inheritance from one generation to another. These central considerations of marriage formed the basis of endogamy, where individuals only married within their social group. Such example includes the case of Sir William Locke, where he would only allow a prospective suitor to marry his daughter after providing his account books, that indicated his economic was worth of value

The announcement of a marriage was preceded by negotiations regarding the practice of dowry. This concerned the contribution of cash and goods provided by the father of the bride. It also involved an exchange by the groom’s father of a jointure, which acted as a pension guaranteeing money, property and goods that would secure the maintenance of the bride if she were to become widowed. This financial security was in addition to what the husband would leave his wife in the will.

In a society that followed primogeniture, the marriage among sons displayed different patterns. A clear distinction was made between the first-born sons and their younger brothers. This was because the eldest son was the heir apparent and had the responsibility of ensuring the continuum of the lineage. It meant first-born sons married in their early twenties and saw them inherit the family’s wealth. On some occasions, the inheritance would be divided among the children; however, the younger siblings would receive a significantly less proportion. This often resulted in a considerably late marriage for the younger brothers, as they were required to accumulate income through individual efforts. Early marriages for them could lead to economic hardships and a lifestyle far from their upbringing. However, if they decided to remain unmarried, the luxurious of their household would satisfy the rest of their lives as a gentleman. For a woman, it was essential to maintain or progress her position within society. Despite their rank, women were seen as the submissive sex and were treated as second class citizens. Women were expected to marry and perform their primary roles of being obedient wives and child bearers. As they were restricted to marriage and motherhood, women relied heavily on their husband for financial support and economic security was deeply sought. Such an example includes Elizabeth Howard, whose father-in-law agreed to settle several manors as her jointure.

The fifth commandment “Honour thy father and mother”, reiterated this social value which saw children accepting marriage arrangements by their parents without much objection. Even in the case of parental death, instructions were left to advisers which described the conditions under which the children were permitted to marry. In a period where there were high mortality rates among adults, this was often specified in wills. According to a primary account in 1558, the will of Michael Wentworth detailed that a significantly lower dowry would be provided to disobedient daughter who were not “advised by my executors, but of their own fantastical brain bestow themselves lightly upon a light person”. Despite children being required to obey their parents and remain loyal to the family, evidence suggestion that there were cases where disobedience would occur. Such as in the example of Thomas Thynne of Longleat and Maria Tuchet, who in 1594 married in secret.

=== Middle classes ===
The arrangements for marriage among the middle class varied according to the means of capital and property families had owned. Those of which had owned land followed similar pressure as the nobility, although to a lesser extent. The strategy of planning marriages ensured however much wealth the family possessed was preserved and would be passed through the inheritance. The custom of dowries and jointures was still prevalent; however, the economic resources exchanged were less in value. Although the children had some say in their choice of spouse for marriage, the custom of endogamy would rarely see one marry below their social standing. According to an account form Harrington regarding arranged marriages, he thought the method was not “so heavy on the lower sort, being better able to shift for themselves, as upon the nobility and gentry”. Evidence suggests that in 1514 a Lancashire girl married a man she disliked, stating “but only for the fear of loss of my land I would never be with him an hour”. Similar to the higher classes, younger sons would have to make their own living before acquiring the means to get married and establish a family. This would be achieved through migrating to new towns or lands in search for employment opportunities. However, the eldest son would have stayed in the household of his upbringing and received an inheritance upon the death of the father.

=== Lower classes ===
The children of those who were at the bottom of society enjoyed considerable freedom in choosing their spouse. Between the ages of seven and fourteen, the children of the poor often left home in order to find employment. This was usually in the form of domestic servants, living-in laborers or apprenticeships, in which individuals would serve a master within a specific trade. After having accumulated sufficient funds that would maintain a family, they were able to make their own decisions regarding their choice of spouse. However, this resulted in the prospect of marriage being delayed, as it prolonged the necessity to stay within a trade and complete a term of apprenticeship. This saw the average age for marriage among the poor to be during their middle to late twenties. It allowed couples to be financially equipped to establish a household. Women were required to support their husbands with their occupation and some even continued to work themselves as servants or wet nurses. The expectation was that the woman would run the household in the absence of the husband and bear his children. It was also vital for women to be equipped with domestic skills, as that saw them fulfilling the duties of an obedient wife

Although interest in marriage among the wealthy was of great importance to family and kin, the incentive to interfere was limited among the lower classes. This was because the crucial component in controlling and arranging marriages required some form of exchange in property or other means of wealth. It meant that lower classes were not concerned with the custom of providing dowries and jointures, since contributions would be limited. Consequently, this lack of economic leverages allowed marriages among the poor to reflect a more personal affair, rather than a socially concentrated decision involving family and kin.

== Courtship ==
Courtship describes a period intended for couples to get to know each other and develop personal affection, before deciding if a marriage should be pursued. The structure of courtship is surrounded by the economic possessions that could be brought into a potential marriage, whether that be of property, dowry, jointures or other settlements.

The practice of exchanging gifts and tokens throughout the period of courting demonstrates the social importance of the stages leading towards marriage. Gifts accompanied courtship in the form of a man proving coins, trinkets or clothing to the woman he is trying to woo. These items represented not only personal matters but defined socially public relations, as these gifts of tokens were often brought by intermediaries who acted as witnesses to the ordeal. This is displayed in the case of William Hanwell, who assigned two pennies to an intermediary that would hand the gift over to his partner. It ensured if any form of contract (see Law section) were to take place, there would be a reliable witness that could properly testify. It was common for couples to express a form of acceptance towards each other; however, this could often lead to unintentional marriages arriving from courtship. According to the Records of Matrimonial Contract Litigation, in 1519 William Hanwell and his partner exchanged present consent. This was a form of contract that made the couple married instantaneously. It is evident from the records that the woman later challenged this marriage. However, two witnesses which were present during the consent were able to testify, which made the marriage legally binding.

Gift giving could continue into marriage as in the example of "Robert Mindum, who between 1593 and 1612, produced and engraved objects made from animal horn and bone. He then gave these to his friends, and also to his wife, Jane Mindum."

== Marriage ==
=== Crying the banns ===
A couple wishing to conduct a church ceremony would have to announce their intention to marry by ‘crying the banns’ on three consecutive Sundays. This process allowed anyone with objections to come forth and declare reasons why the union should not proceed. A common reason involved a ‘pre-contract’, where one of the partners was already promised to another person. If there were no obstacles, the Church provided its blessing, allowing the couple to pursue the wedding.

=== Procession ===
The wedding day proceeded with the arrival of the couple outside the church door, where the priest would initiate the service. During the ceremony, the couple took each other in marriage and promised to hold their vows until death do them part in both sickness and health. The woman additionally undertook an oath to obey her husband. Then the man would place the ring on the Bible, where it was blessed, before putting it on the woman’s right hand, on the fourth finger. After the couple received a blessing from the priest, they are pronounced husband and wife. Following this, the couple enter the church for nuptial mass to be performed. The couple would be kneeling before an altar, with a veil placed over their heads. The priest would then recite prayers over them and after finishing, would remove the veil. This meant the couple were officially married. The day would continue with celebrations, which included a wedding dinner and festive dancing. For couples that derived from lower classes, guests made gifts and could contribute to the ‘bride ale’ and entertainment. In order for a marriage to be considered legally binding, it had to be consummated. This could involve the couple being accompanied to bed by the priest and other witnesses. It ensure a testimony could be provided. They would then be left alone and have their privacy.

== Law ==
=== Age of marriage ===
When a growing population of poverty caused by "over-hasting marriages and over-soon setting up of households by the youth", the decree of the Common Council of London in 1556 raised the age of consent to twenty-one. This aligned with the contemporary views that condemned those who had no means to establish and maintain their own household. The Poor Relief Act 1601 (43 Eliz. 1. c. 2) also contributed to an increase in the average age of first marriage. It allowed overseers to apprentice children of the parish poor from the age of ten to twenty-four, essentially delaying the prospects of marriage. Although it was possible with parental permission for girls to marry at twelve and boys at fourteen, it was not usual for such marriages to occur.

=== Contracts ===
There were two ways a marriage could be entered based on a contract. The first type of contract was "per verba de prasenti". This involved the mutual exchange of present consent between a man and woman (“I take thee as wife/ husband”). It was an indissoluble commitment, as regarded under ecclesiastical law. The second type of contract that made a marriage legally binding was per "verba de futuro". This was based on the mutual exchange of future consent made by two capable parties (“I promise to take thee as wife/ husband”). If this promise was then followed by consummation, that marriage would become legitimate. However, if this consent was not followed by consummation, the marriage could be considered null and void. For this contract to be broken, both individuals must mutually agree to dissolve the marriage. It was essential for contracts to be witnessed, in order for the courts and civil lawyers to recognize a couple as legally married. A witness had to be present during the oral commitment, and in the case of ‘future consent’, must be able provide a testimony that sexual intercourse had taken place.
