= Master of the Countess of Warwick =

The Master of the Countess of Warwick is a painter who worked in Tudor England, producing dated work during the 1560s. The artist, who is not known by name, was given this moniker by Roy Strong, a specialist in Elizabethan portraiture, who attributed works to him or her on stylistic grounds. The painter is named after a portrait of Anne Russell, Countess of Warwick, which is in the collection of Woburn Abbey. The paintings have an affinity with the style of Elizabethan miniaturists. For example, in Four children making music it is possible to read the printed music of one of the partbooks.

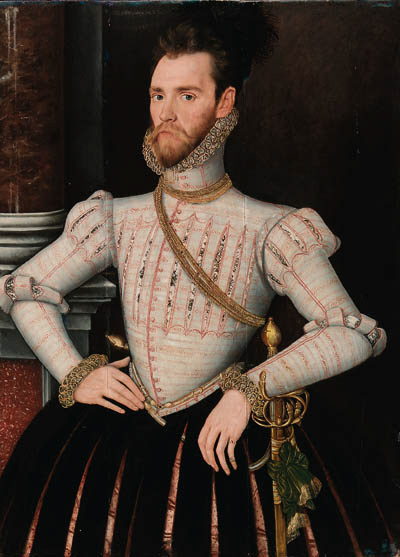
Sir Thomas Knyvett.

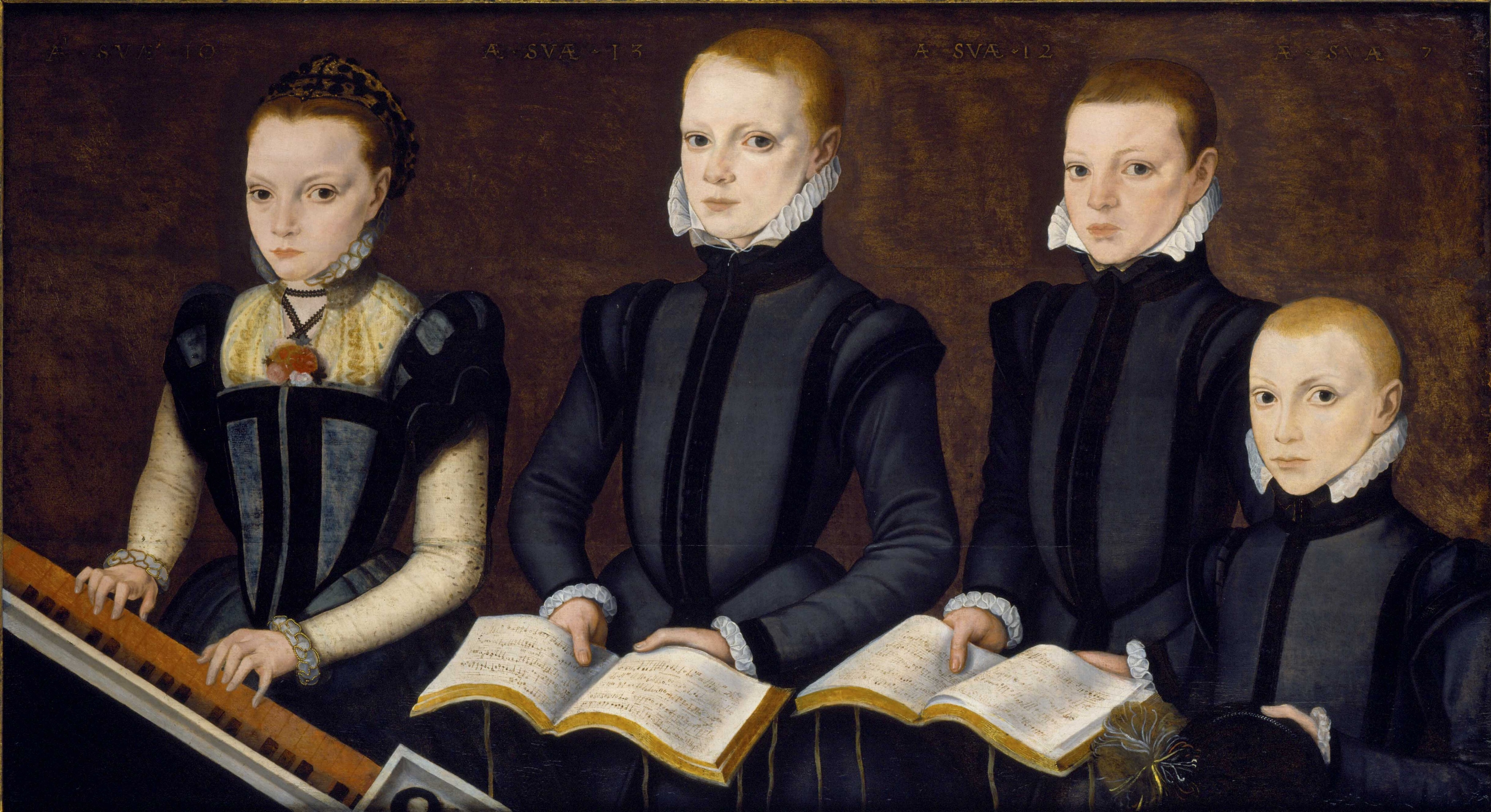
Four children making music

In 1969 Roy Strong identified eight portraits by the Master of the Countess of Warwick, but over the years the number of attributions has grown. For example, Compton Verney Art Gallery has a painting, not on the original list, which was auctioned as "English school" in 1999. It is now attributed to the Master. Interest in the work of the Master and his/her identity was increased by a 2023 exhibition at Compton Verney 'Tudor Mystery: A Master Painter Revealed', which the gallery mounted in collaboration with Philip Mould & Company. The curators suggested that about 40 works could be attributed to the artist.

== Bibliography ==
- Strong, Roy. The English Icon
- Strong, Roy. Tudor & Jacobean Portraits in the National Portrait Gallery (Her Majesty's Stationery Office, London, 1969)
