= Timeline of World War II (1944) =

1944 in the Second World War

← 1943 1945 →
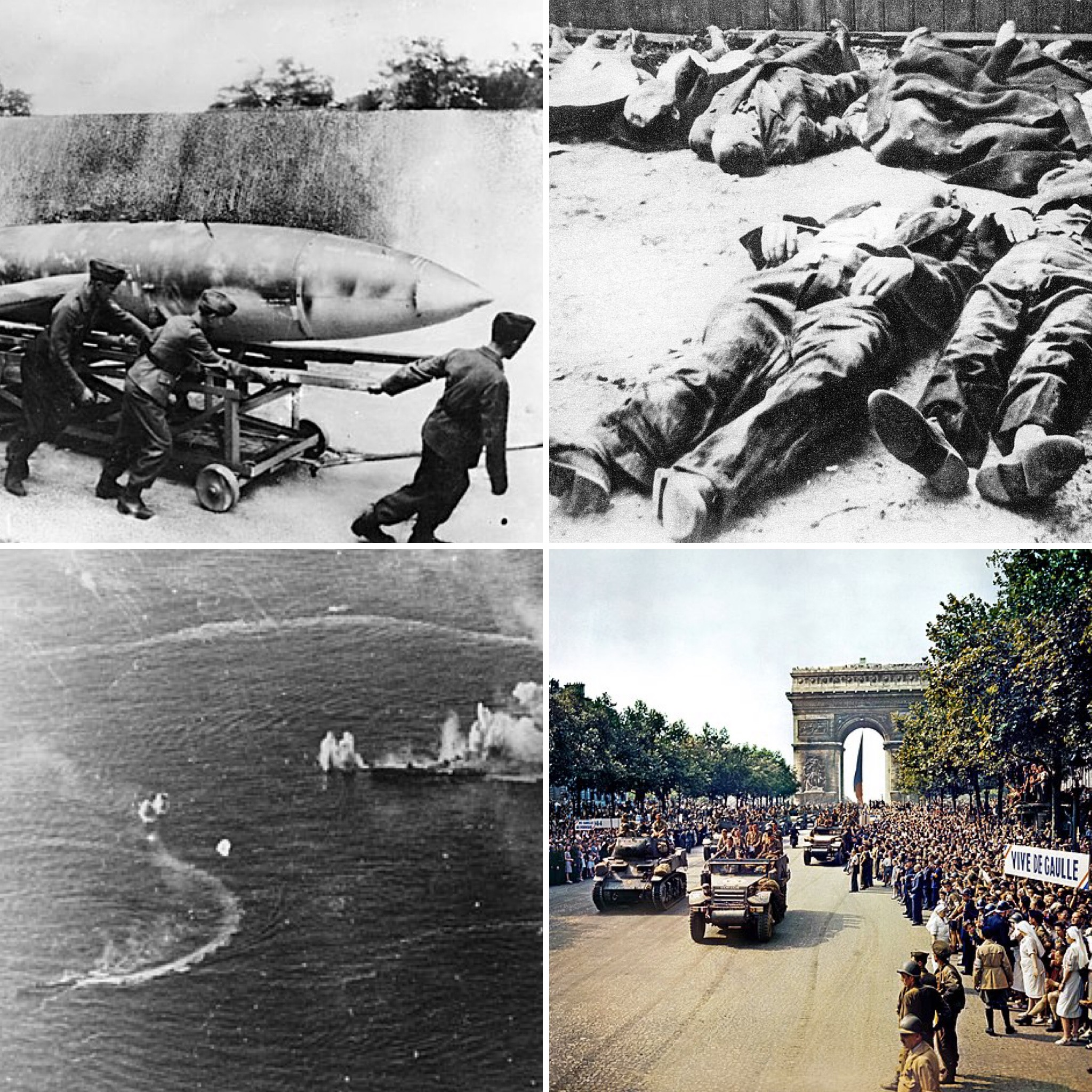
- Clockwise from top left: Germany's V-1 flying bomb, aftermath of the Wola massacre in Poland, liberation of Paris, battle of the Philippine Sea
Location	Global

Belligerents
Allies: Soviet Union; Poland (PGRP); United States; Philippines; United Kingdom; India; New Zealand; Burma; China; Nationalists; Communists; Free France; France; Poland (exiled government); Czechoslovakia; South Africa; Canada; Australia; Norway; Luxembourg (exiled government); Luxembourg; Netherlands; Dutch East Indies; Belgium (exiled government); Belgium; Greece (exiled government); Greece; Yugoslavia (exiled government); Yugoslavia; Ethiopia; Mexico; Brazil; Albania; Iraq; Iran; Italy; Romania; Bulgaria; Finland	Axis: Germany; General Government; Serbia (surrendered); Vichy France (surrendered); Italian Social Republic; Albania (surrendered); Slovakia; GONU; Japan; Burma; Azad Hind; Hungary (surrendered); Romania (surrendered); Bulgaria (surrendered); Thailand; Croatia; Manchukuo; Co-belligerents; Finland (surrendered)

This is a timeline of events that occurred during 1944 in World War II.

== January ==
January 1944

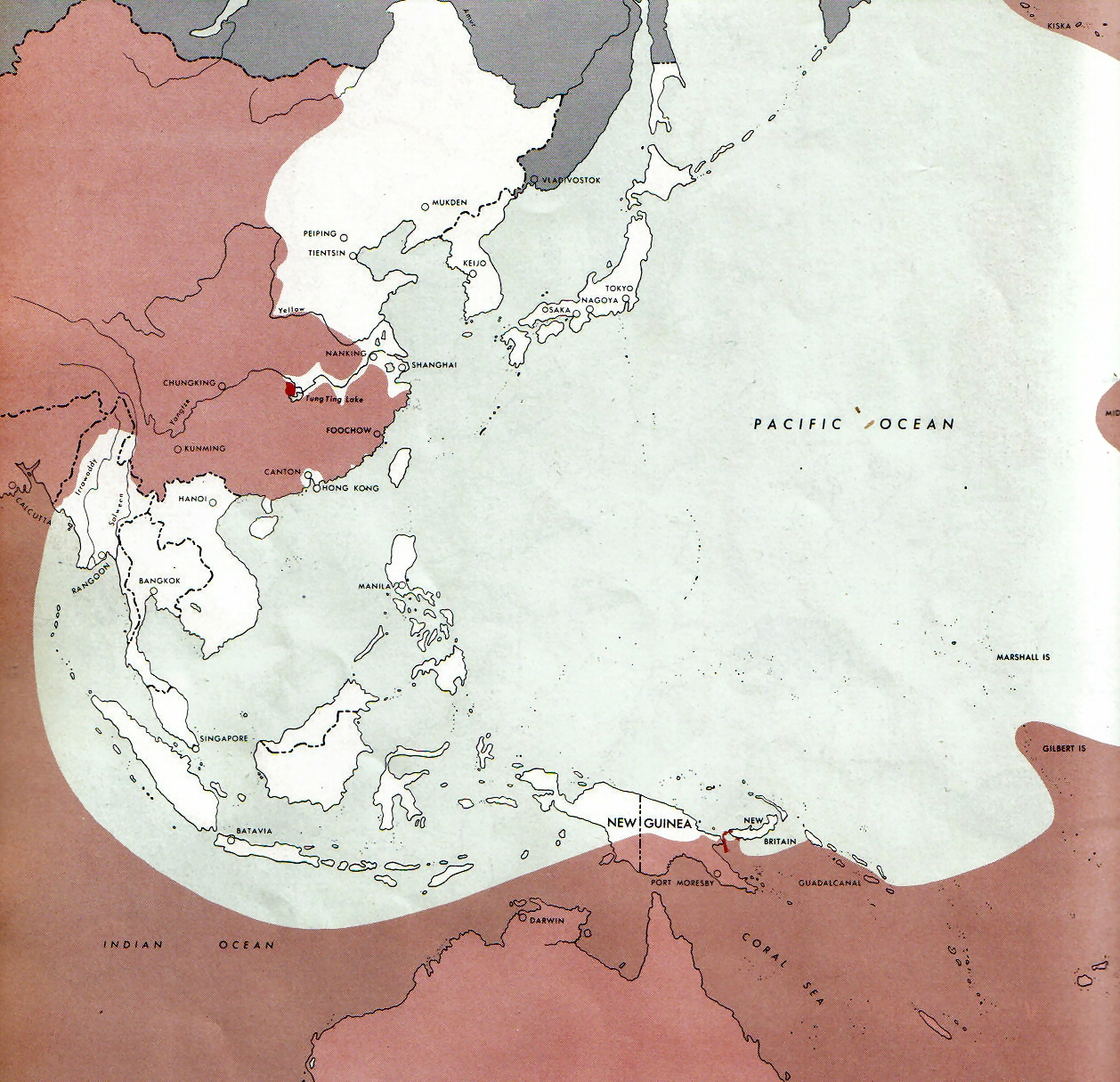
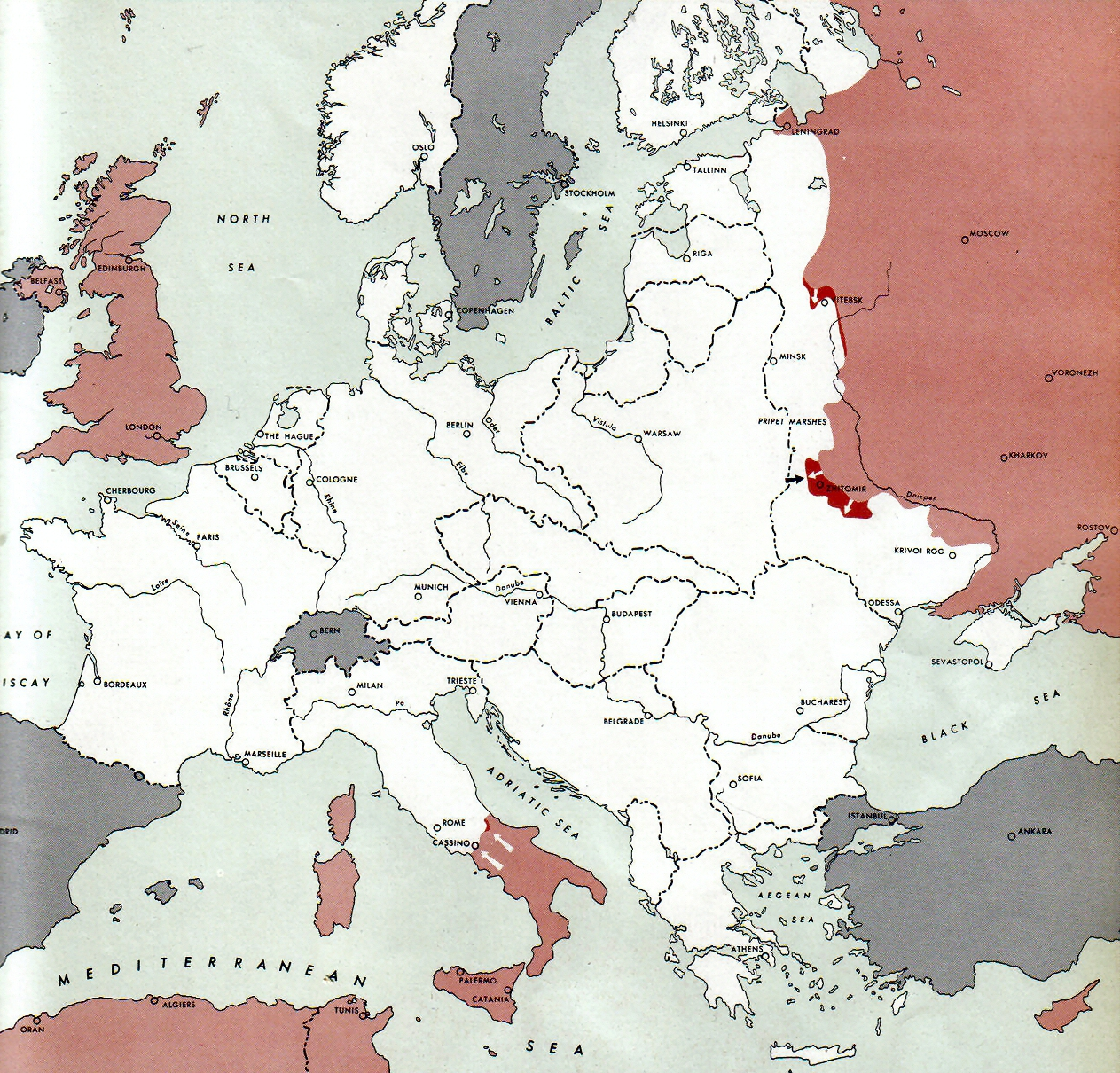
1st

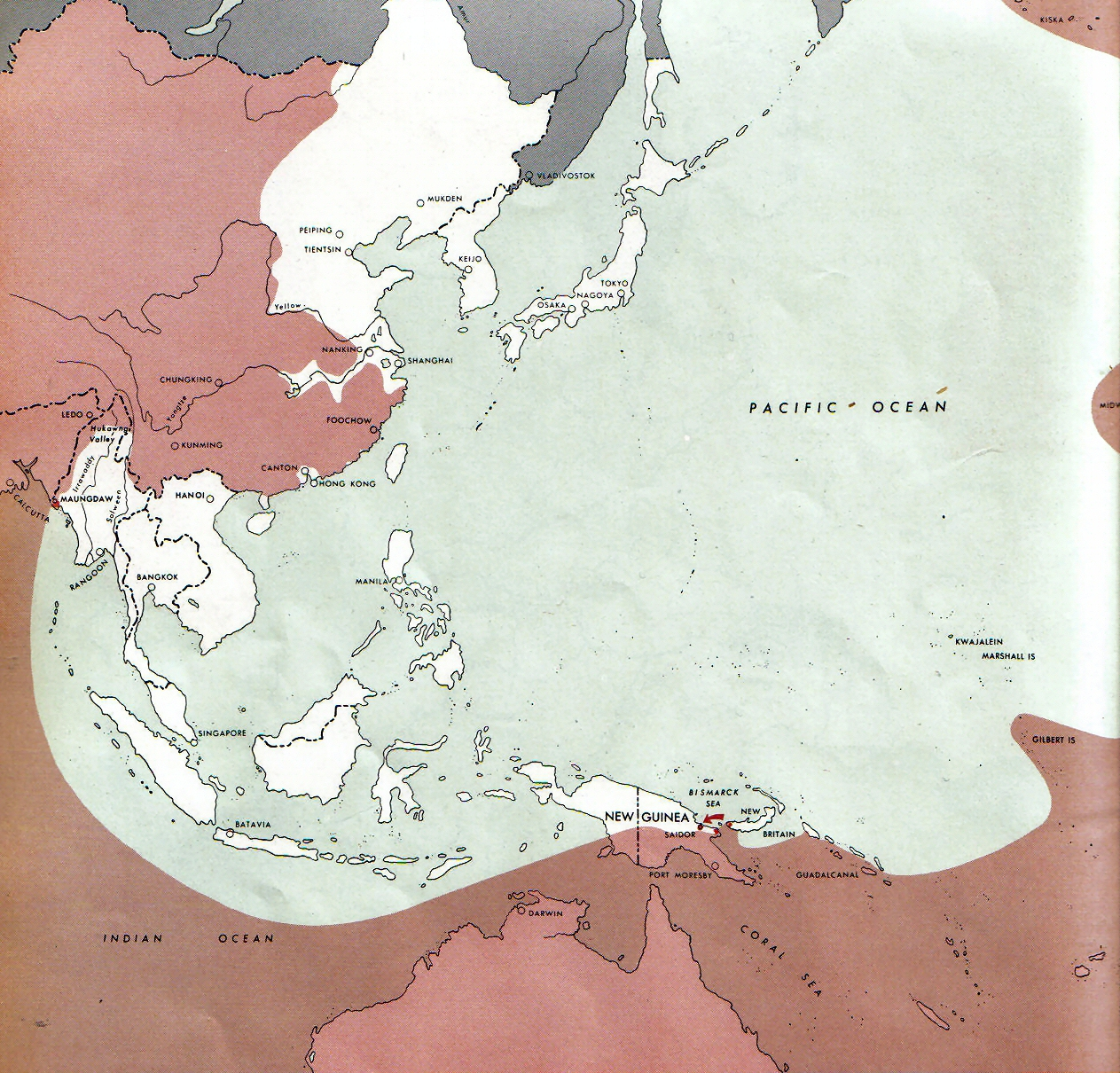
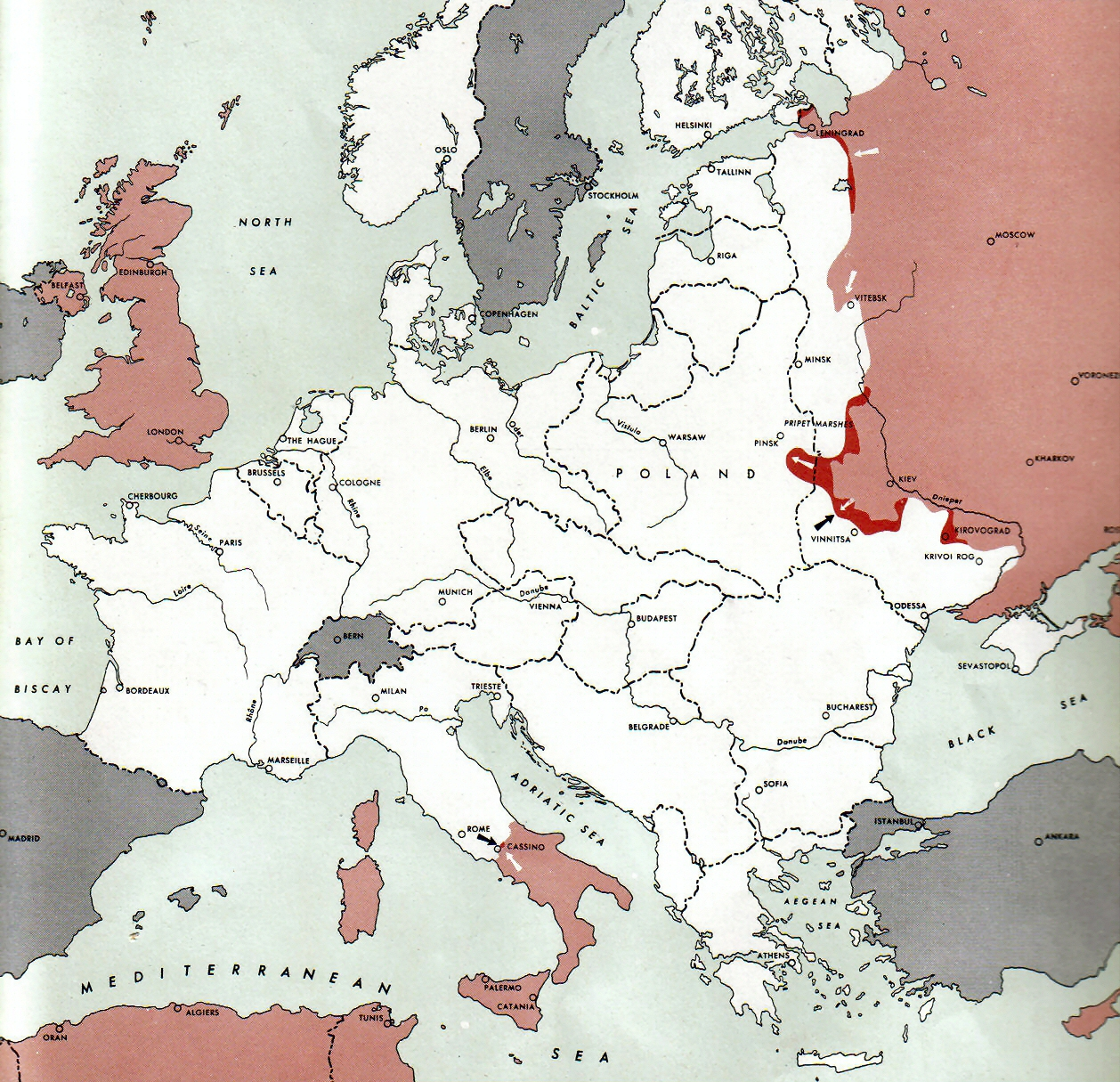
15th

3: Major Gregory Pappy Boyington, the USMC fighter ace, was shot down after downing the last 3 of his 26 victories, and would spend the next 20 months in Japanese POW Camps.

4: The 1st Ukrainian Front of the Red Army enters Poland.

9: British forces take Maungdaw, Burma, a critical port for Allied supplies.

11: Count Ciano, the Italian Foreign Minister and Mussolini's son-in-law, is executed by Mussolini's revived Fascist government sympathizers.

12: The SS United Victory, the first Victory ship, is launched; this class of transport will prove to be crucial in hauling men and supplies across the oceans.

16: General Dwight D. Eisenhower arrived in London, returning from a week of rest and planning in Washington, D. C., and assumed command of the European Theater by General Orders No. 4. His new title was Commanding General, U.S. Forces, European Theater of Operations.

17: The first Battle of Monte Cassino begins when the British X Corps attacks along the Garigliano river at the western end of the German Gustav Line.

19: Red Army troops push westward toward the Baltic countries.
: British Operation Outward accidentally claims lives in Sweden by knocking out lighting and causing a train crash.

20: The Royal Air Force drops 2,300 tons of bombs on Berlin.
: The U.S. Army 36th Infantry Division, in Italy, attempts to cross the Gari River but suffers heavy losses.

22: Allies begin Operation Shingle, the landing at Anzio, Italy, commanded by American Major General John P. Lucas. The Allies hope to break the stalemate in south Italy, but they are unable to break out of the beachhead and the line holds until late May. The minesweeper USS Portent (AM-106), commanded by Lt. H.C. Plummer, hit a mine and sank southeast of Anzio, Italy.

23: The British destroyer HMS Janus is sunk off Anzio.

24: The Allied forces have a major setback on the Gari River in Italy.

24: In German-occupied Belgium, the Social Pact, detailing plans for post-war social reform, is secretly signed.

27: The Siege of Leningrad ended after 872 days, as Soviet forces finally forced the Germans to withdraw. Some 2 million died, mostly of starvation and disease.

28: The Soviet Army completes encirclement of two German Army corps at the Korsun pocket, south of Kiev. Two-thirds of the Germans escape in the breakout next month with the loss of most heavy equipment.

30: The Japanese kill 44 suspected spies in the Homfreyganj massacre.
: At Anzio, Italy the disastrous Battle of Cisterna took place, as MG John P. Lucas sent Darby's Rangers to begin the breakout from the beachhead. One of the four battalions in the action returned with only 6 of 767 men, the rest killed, wounded or captured.
: The Brazzaville Conference begins in French Equatorial Africa. During the conference (which lasts until 8 February), the French Committee of National Liberation (CFLN) agrees to major reforms to the French colonial empire.
: U.S. Navy shelling and carrier bombing began in the Marshall Islands, preliminary to invasions the following day.

31: Operation Flintlock began, as American forces land on Kwajalein Atoll and other islands in the Japanese-held Marshall Islands. United States troops also invade Majuro, Marshall Islands.

== February ==
February 1944

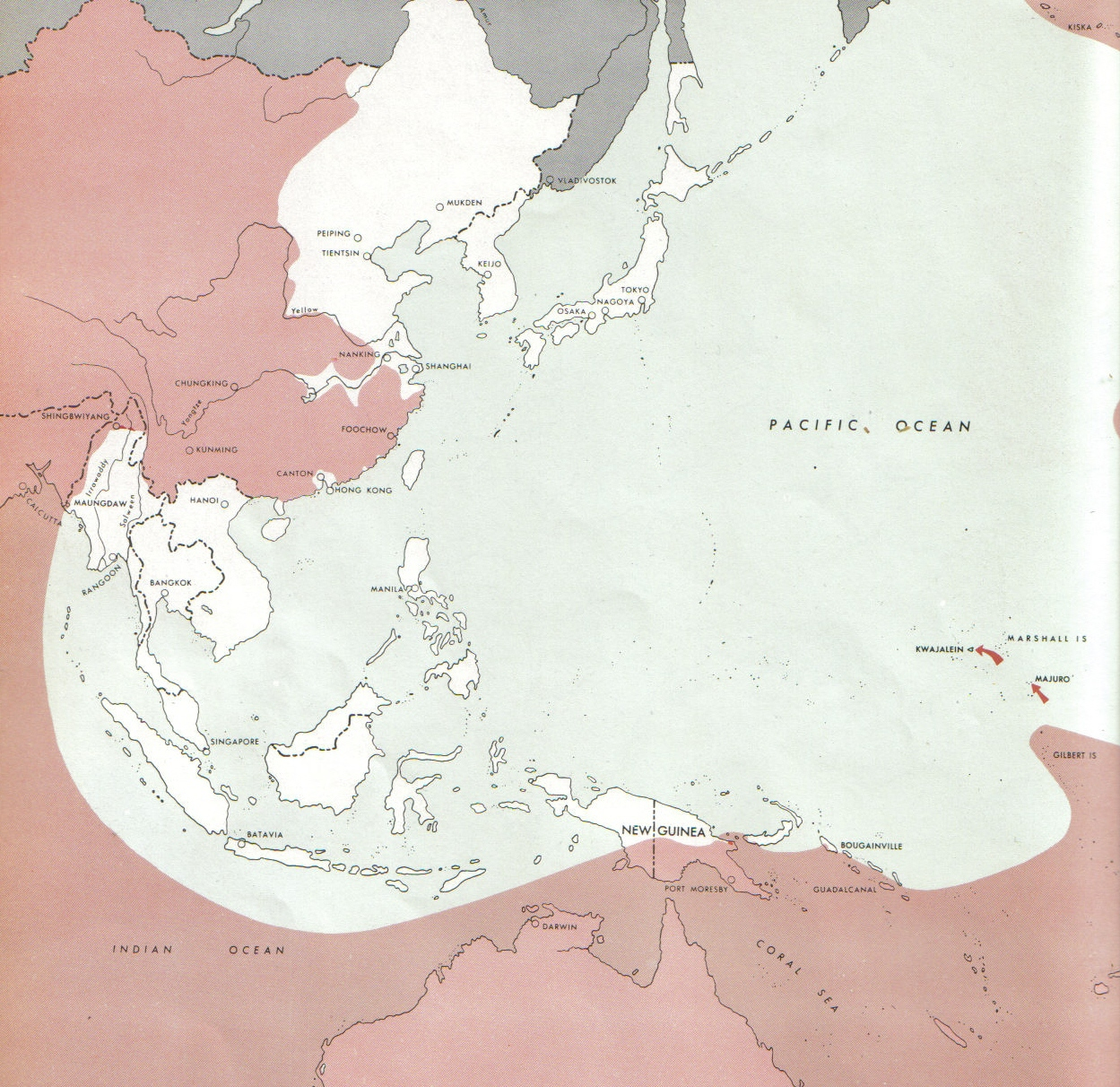
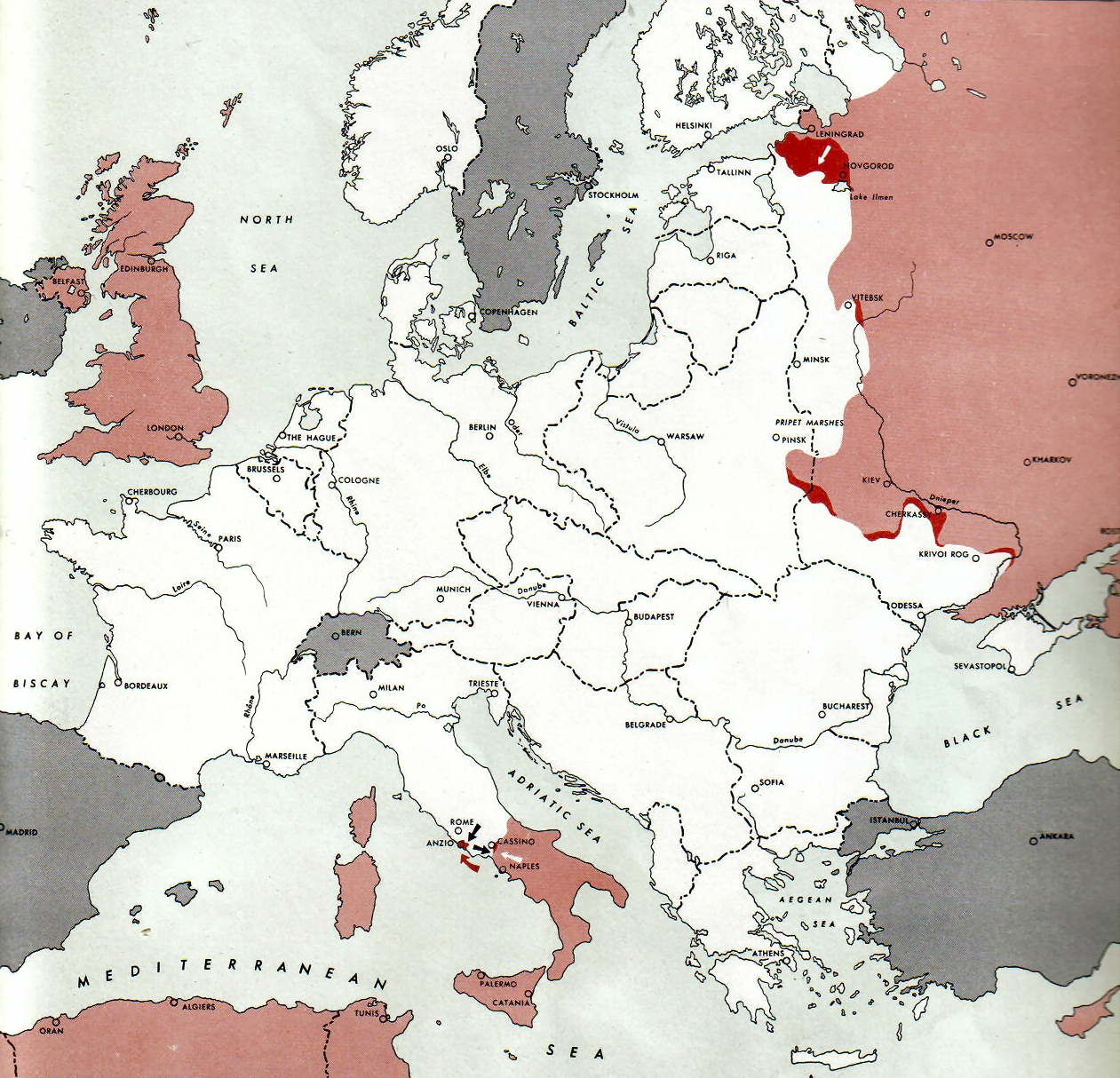
1st

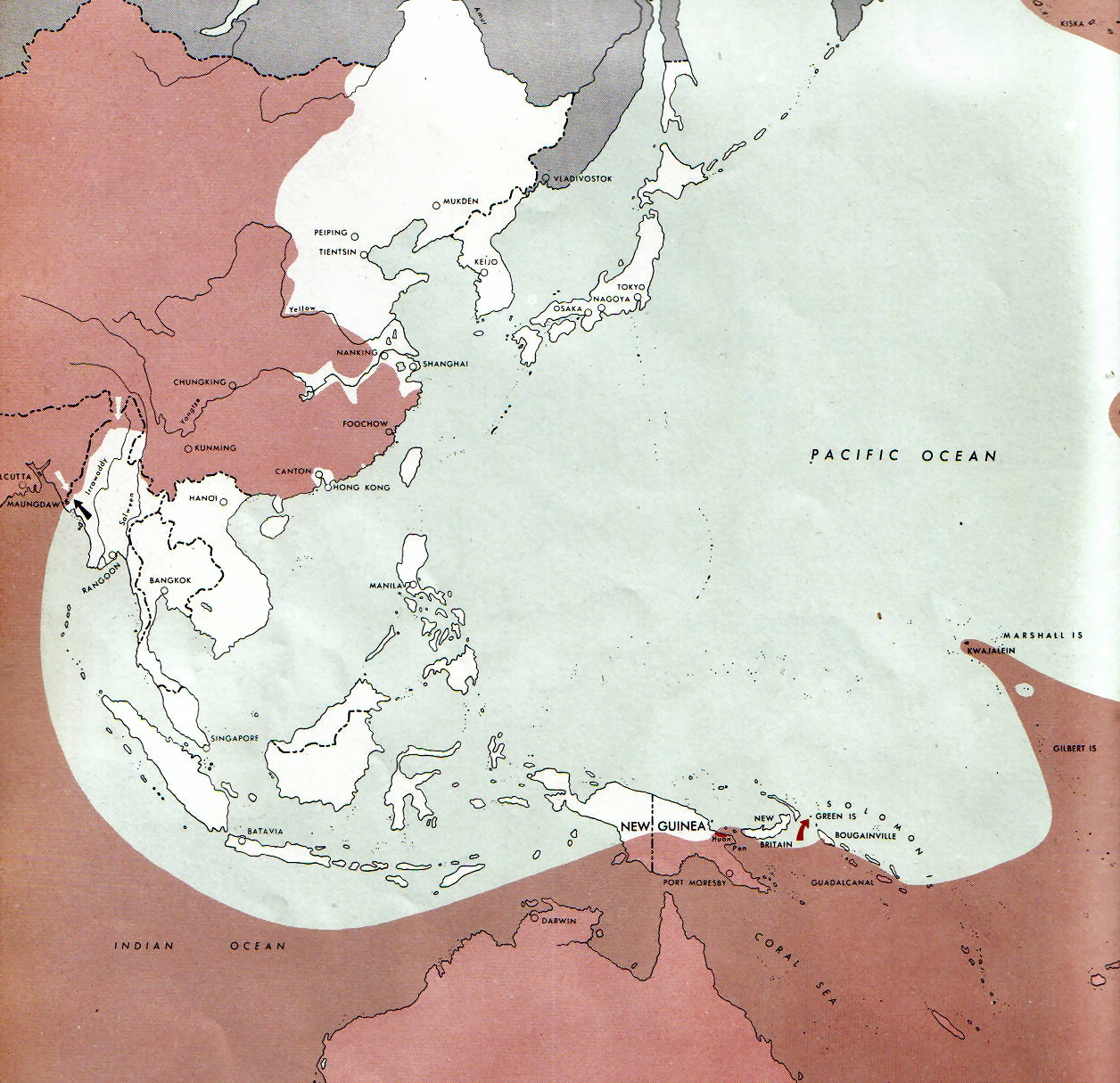
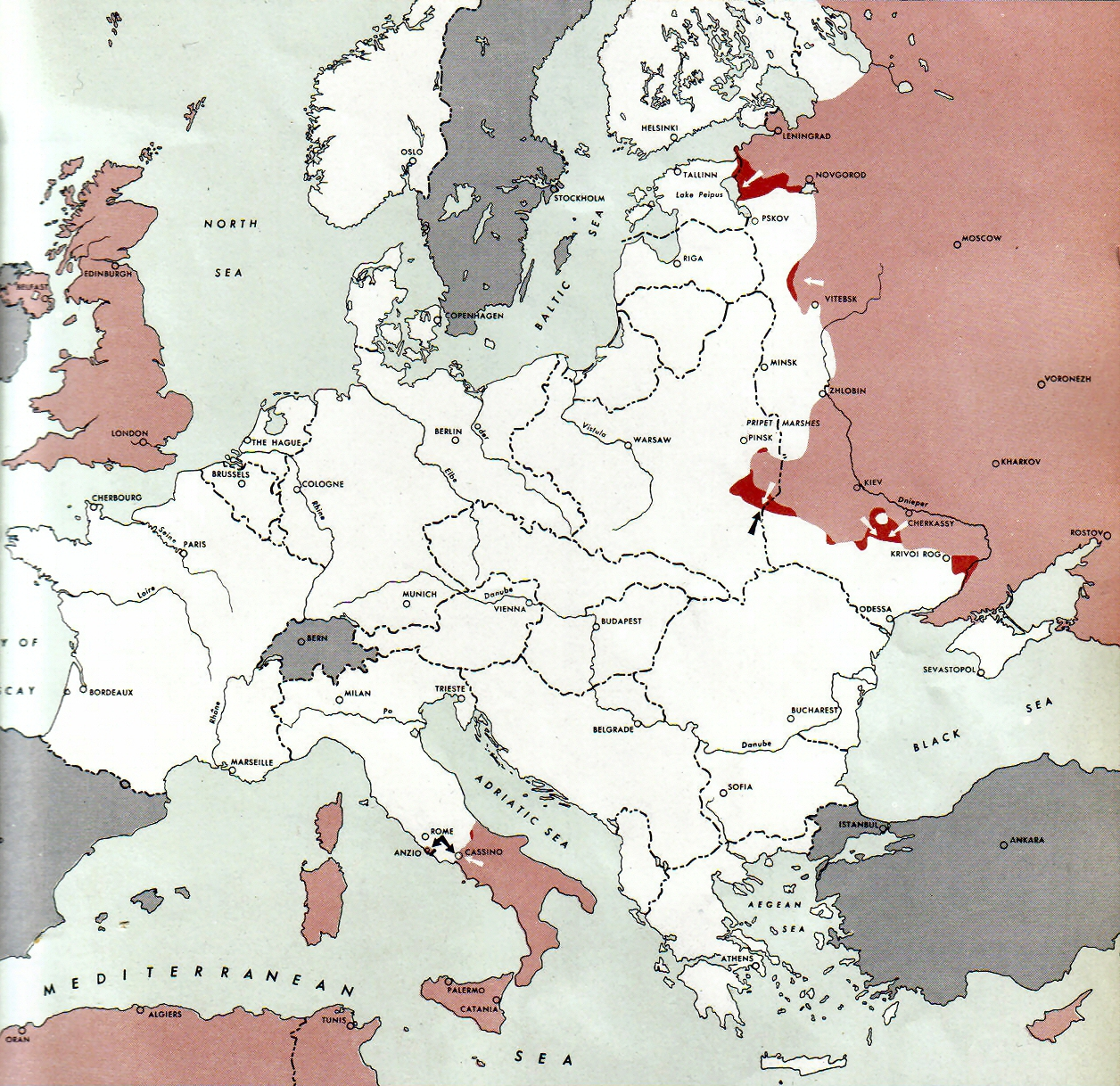
15th

1: U.S. Marines mop up on Roi and Namur in the northern part of the Kwajalein atoll in the Marshall Islands.

2: The Narva front near the east border of Estonia is formed between the Soviet and German forces.
: Germans defeat American troops in the Battle of Cisterna near Anzio.

3: American planes bomb Eniwetok in the Marshalls, later to be a major B-29 base.

4: Kwajalein, the world's largest atoll and a major Japanese naval base, is secured.

5: The American Navy bombards the Kuril Islands, northernmost in the Japanese homelands.

7: In a radio interview, the last Estonian Prime Minister Jüri Uluots, as acting Head of State, supports mobilisation.

8: The plan for the invasion of France, Operation Overlord, is confirmed.

10: Winston Churchill urges Harold Alexander to order the Anzio generals to show more aggression.

11: In the battle of Korsun–Cherkassy, German forces sent to relieve the Korsun pocket in Ukraine are now only 10 miles away.

14: The Russian 374th Rifle Regiment forms a bridgehead on the western shore of Lake Peipus. The Mereküla Landing Operation of the special unit of the Soviet Baltic Sea Fleet in the rear of the Germans at the Narva front at Mereküla is resisted.
: The underground organisation, the National Committee of the Republic of Estonia, is formed in Tallinn.
: Supreme Headquarters Allied Expeditionary Force (SHAEF) headquarters are established in Britain by U.S. General Dwight D. Eisenhower.

15: The second Battle of Monte Cassino begins with the destruction of the historic Benedictine monastery on Monte Cassino by Allied bombing. The Allies believed the grounds were used as an observation post by the Germans.
: The Soviet bridgehead on the west coast of Lake Peipus is annihilated.
: Soviet Leningrad Front initiates the Narva Offensive, February 15–28.

16: Germans launch a major counter-attack at Anzio, threatening the American beachhead.
: Germans, with Panzer forces leading, fail to break out of the Korsun pocket.
: Diplomats from the USSR and Finland meet to sign an armistice.

17: American Marines land on Eniwetok.

18: The light cruiser HMS Penelope is torpedoed and sunk off the coast of Anzio with a loss of 415 crew.
: American naval air raid takes place on the Truk islands, a major Japanese naval base, but they will be one of the bypassed fortresses of the Japanese outer defence ring.

19: Leipzig, Germany is bombed for two straight nights. This marks the beginning of a "Big Week" bombing campaign against German industrial cities by Allied bombers.

20: A colonial military garrison in Luluabourg in the Belgian Congo mutinies, killing three.

22: John P. Lucas is replaced as commander of the U.S. VI Corps by Major General Lucian Truscott at Anzio.

23: US Navy planes attack the Mariana Islands of Saipan, Guam and Tinian.

26: The "Big Week" bombing campaign comes to a successful conclusion; the American P-51 Mustang fighter with its long range proves invaluable in protecting American bombers over Germany.
: Red Air Force continues to bomb Helsinki, as Finland continues peace talks.

27: USS Cod sinks a Japanese merchant ship by torpedo.

28: Belgian industrialist Alexandre Galopin is assassinated in occupied Belgium by Flemish paramilitaries.

29: The Admiralty Islands are invaded by U.S. forces, marked by the Battle of Los Negros and Operation Brewer. The struggle for this important fleet anchorage will continue until May. Rabaul is now completely isolated.

== March ==
March 1944

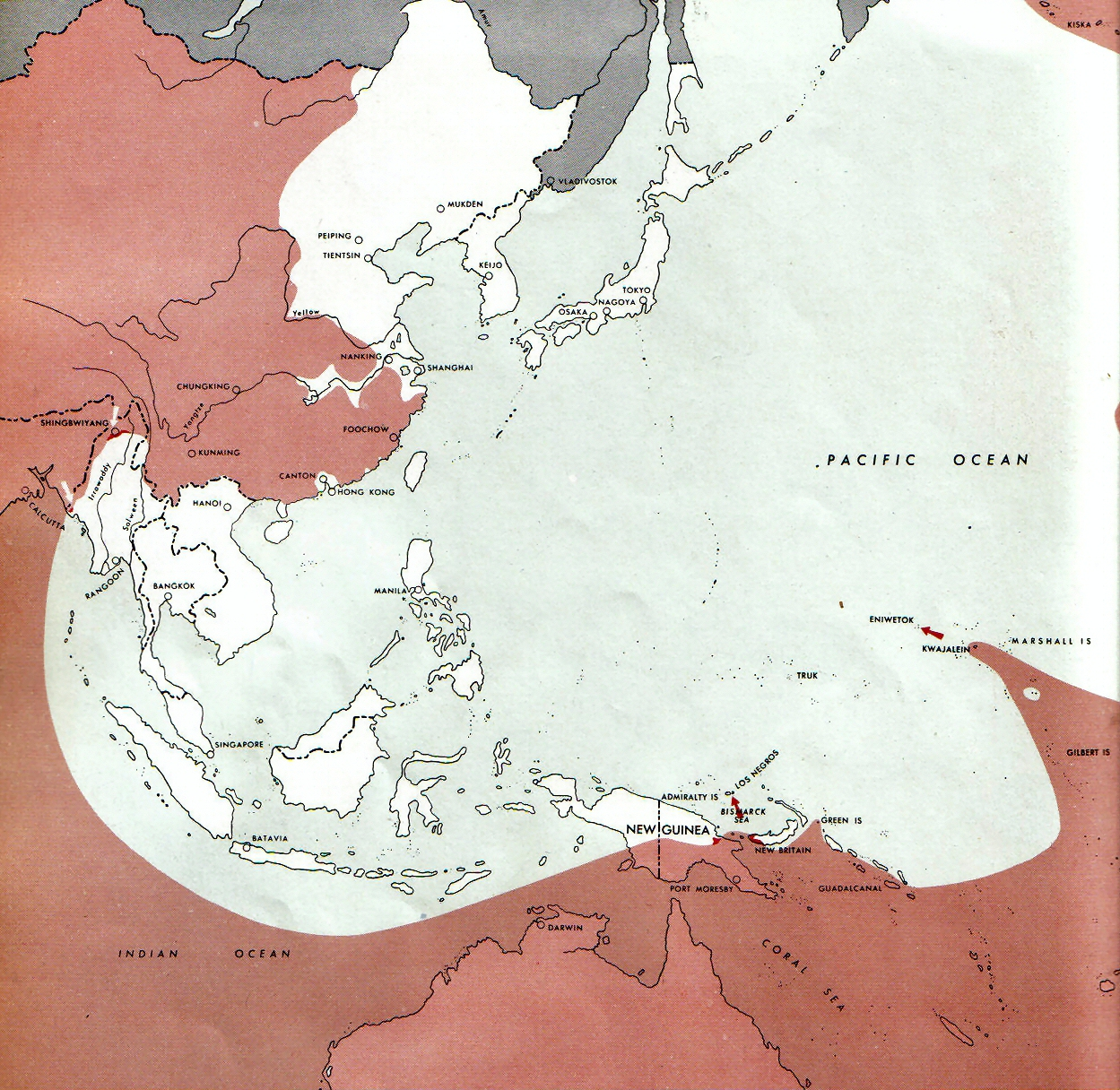
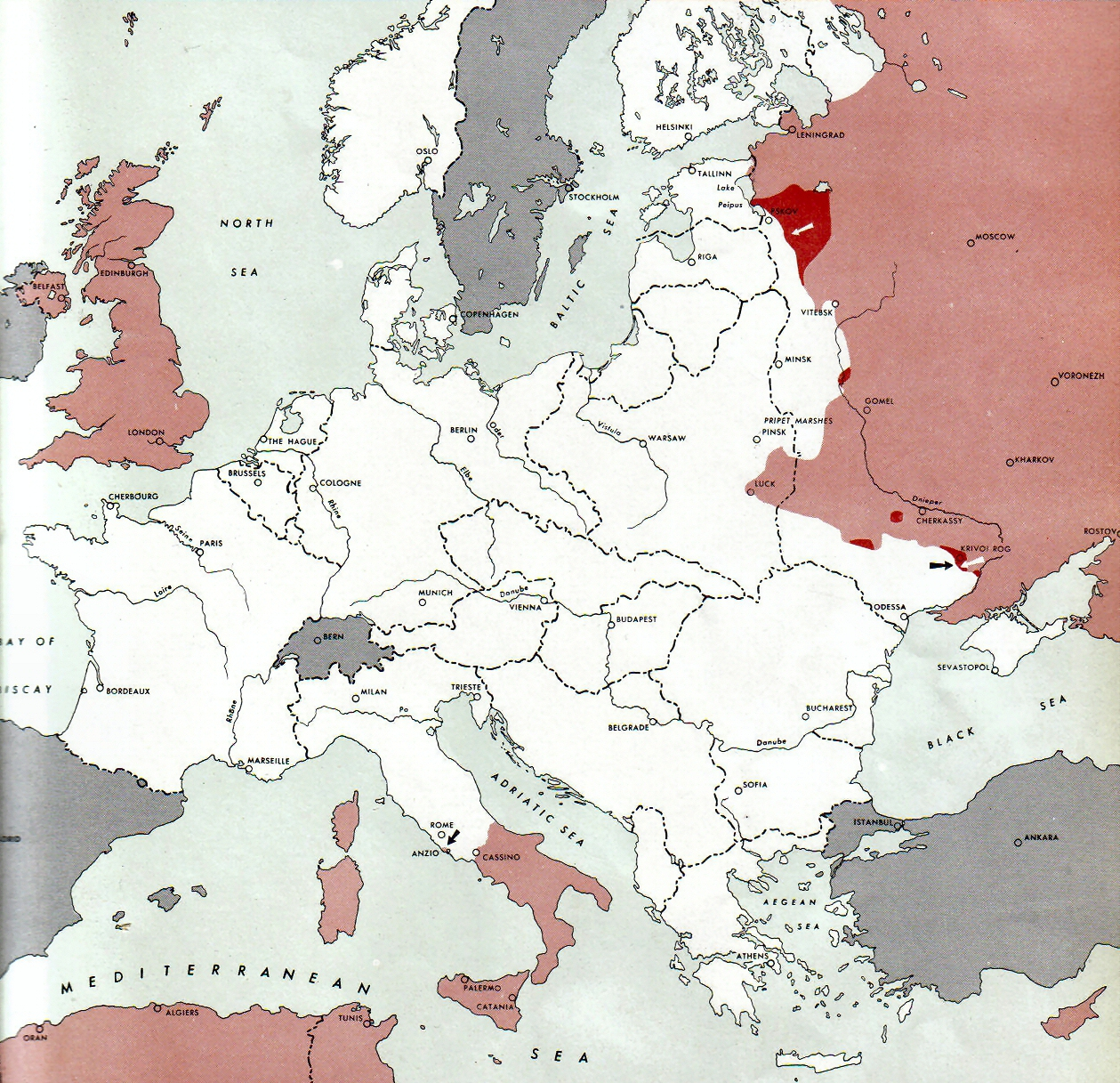
1st

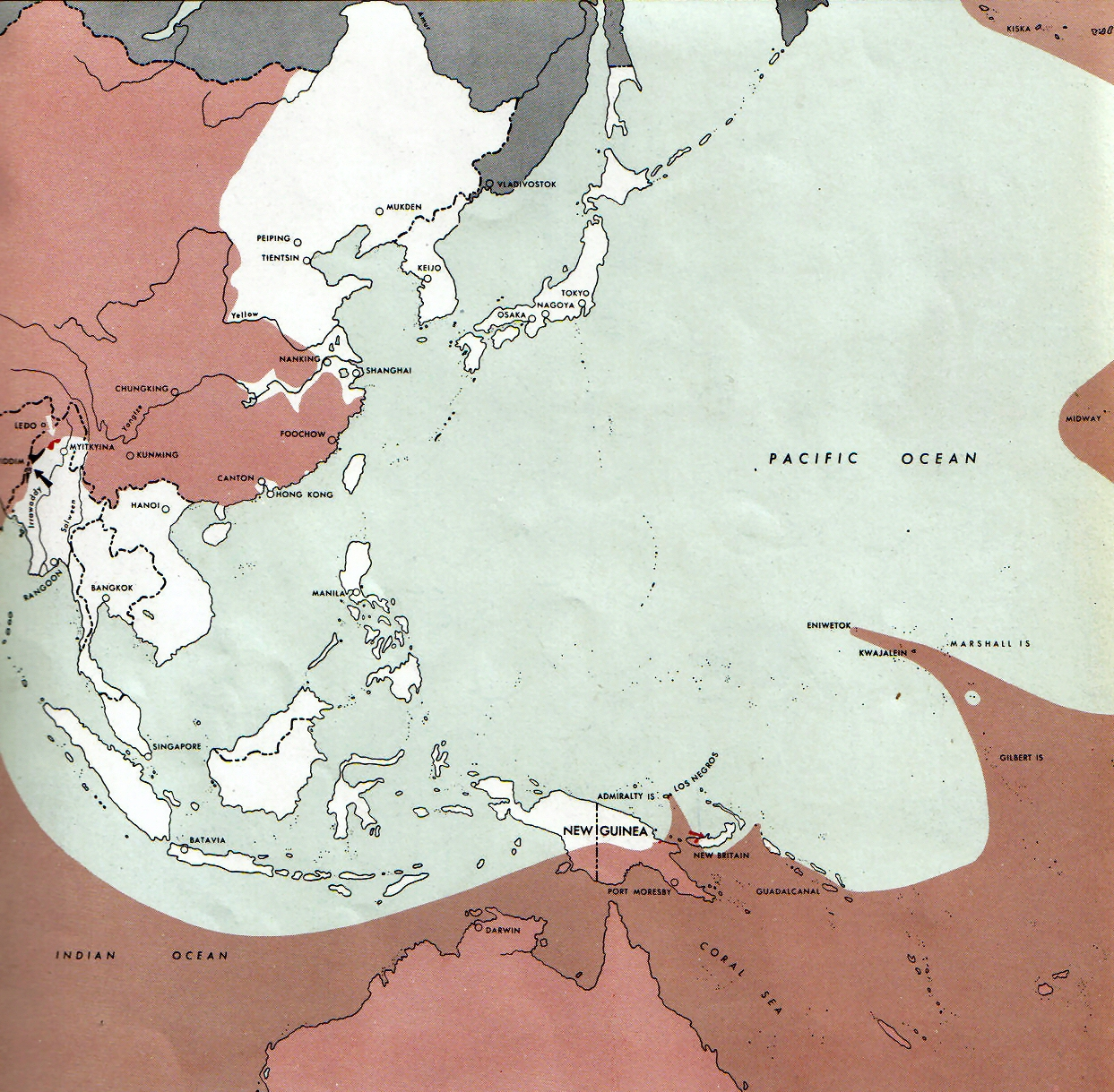
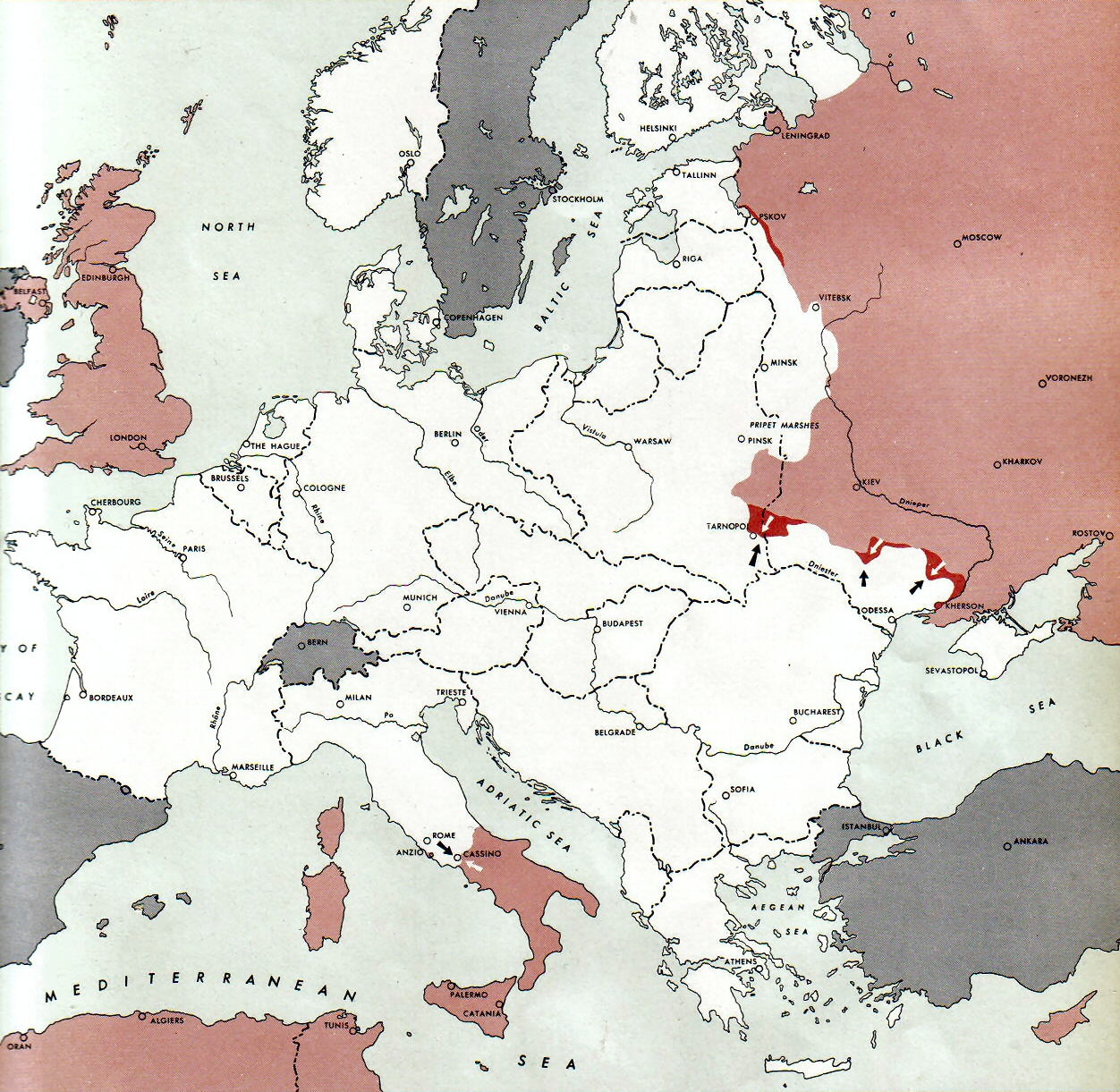
15th

1: The keels of USS Tarawa and USS Kearsarge are laid down.
: Anti-fascist strikes occur in northern Italy.
: Leningrad Front initiate the Narva Offensive, March 1–4.
: The Allies bomb the Vatican for the 2nd time

3: German forces around Anzio, having failed to drive the Allies from the beachhead, go over to a defensive posture.

4: Winston Churchill told the House of Commons the Allies intended to completely isolate Ireland to prevent military secrets from leaking to the Axis, hinting the border with Northern Ireland would soon be closed. 30 Royal Air Force planes were sent to attack Düsseldorf overnight.

6: Wingate's Chindits make several successful forays in Burma.
: The Soviet Air Force bombs Narva, the city is destroyed. The Leningrad Front initiates the Narva Offensive, March 6–24.
: The Allies receive intelligence that the Japanese may be about to attack Western Australia, causing them to greatly bolster defenses there. When no attack comes, forces return to their regular stations on the 20th.

7: Japanese begin an invasion attempt on India, starting a four-month battle around Imphal.

8: American forces are attacked by Japanese troops on Hill 700 in Bougainville; the battle will last five days.
: A Red Army offensive on a wide front west of the Dnieper in Ukraine forces the Germans into a major retreat.

9: The Soviet Long Range Aviation carries out an air raid on Tallinn, Estonia. The military targets are almost untouched. Approx. 800 civilians die and 20,000 people are left without shelter.

10: The creation of the Political Committee of National Liberation in Greece.

13: On Bougainville, Japanese troops end their failed assault on American forces at Hill 700.

15: The third Battle of Monte Cassino begins. The small town of Cassino is destroyed by Allied bombers.
: Americans take Manus Island in the Admiralty chain.
: The National Council of the French Resistance approves the Resistance programme.

16: United States XI Corps arrives in Pacific Theater.

17: Heavy bombing of Vienna, Austria.

18: The Red Army approaches the Romanian border.

19: German forces occupy Hungary in Operation Margarethe.
: Yugoslav partisans attack Trieste, on the border of Italy and Slovenia.

20: Red Army advances in Ukraine continue with great success.

21: Finland rejects Soviet peace terms.

22: Japanese forces cross the Indian border all along the Imphal front.
: Frankfurt is bombed with heavy civilian losses.

24: The Fosse Ardeatine massacre in Rome, Italy. 335 Italians are killed, including 75 Jews and over 200 members of various groups in the Italian Resistance; this is a German response to a bomb blast that killed German troops.
: Orde Wingate is killed in a plane crash.
: Heavy bombings of German cities at various strategic locations last for 24 hours.

25: Soviet air force bombs the city of Tartu, Estonia.

26: On Narva front, Strachwitz Offensive destroys part of the Soviet bridgehead.

28: Japanese troops are in retreat in Burma.

30: RAF suffers grievous losses in a huge air raid on Nuremberg.

== April ==
April 1944

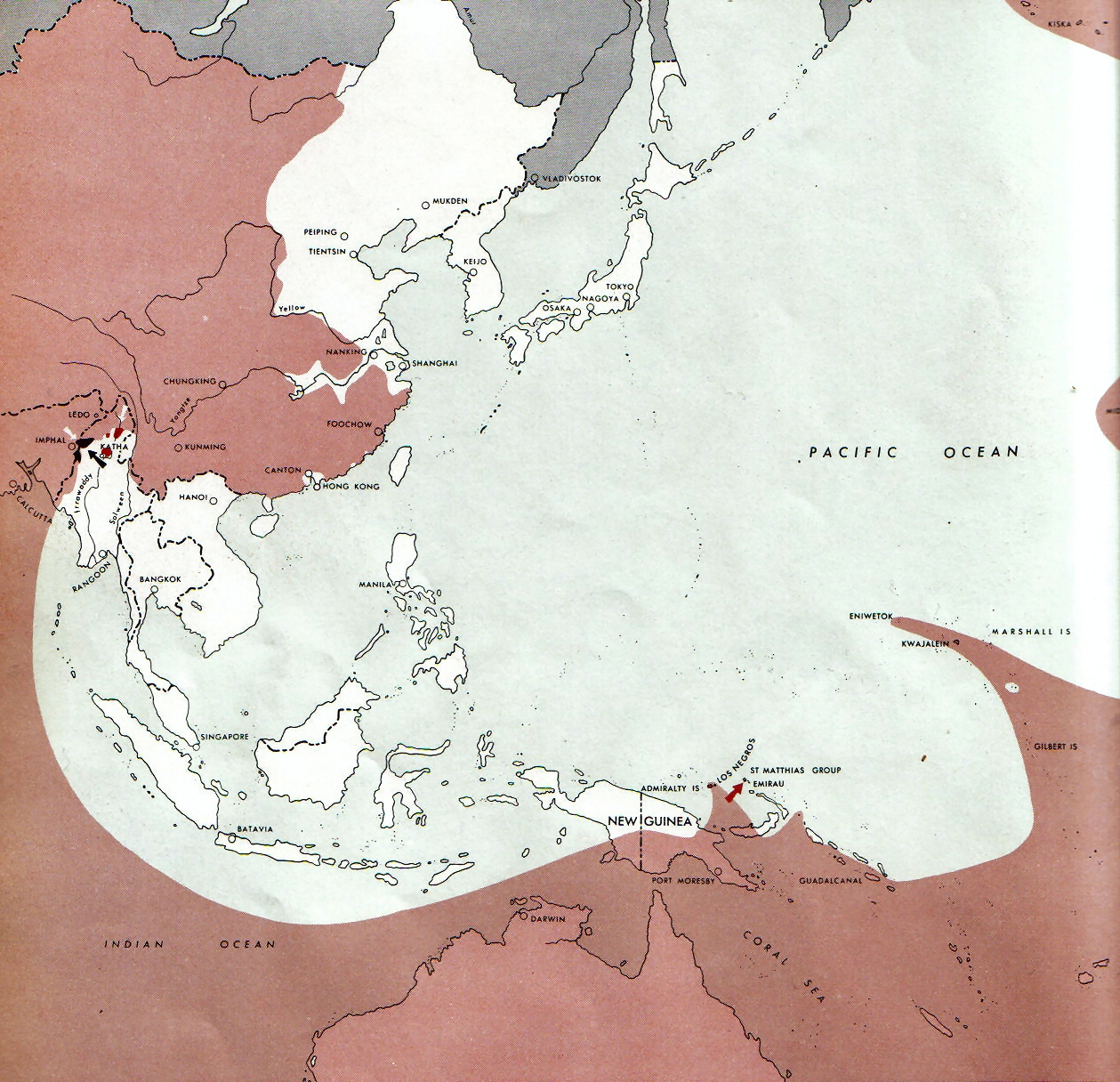
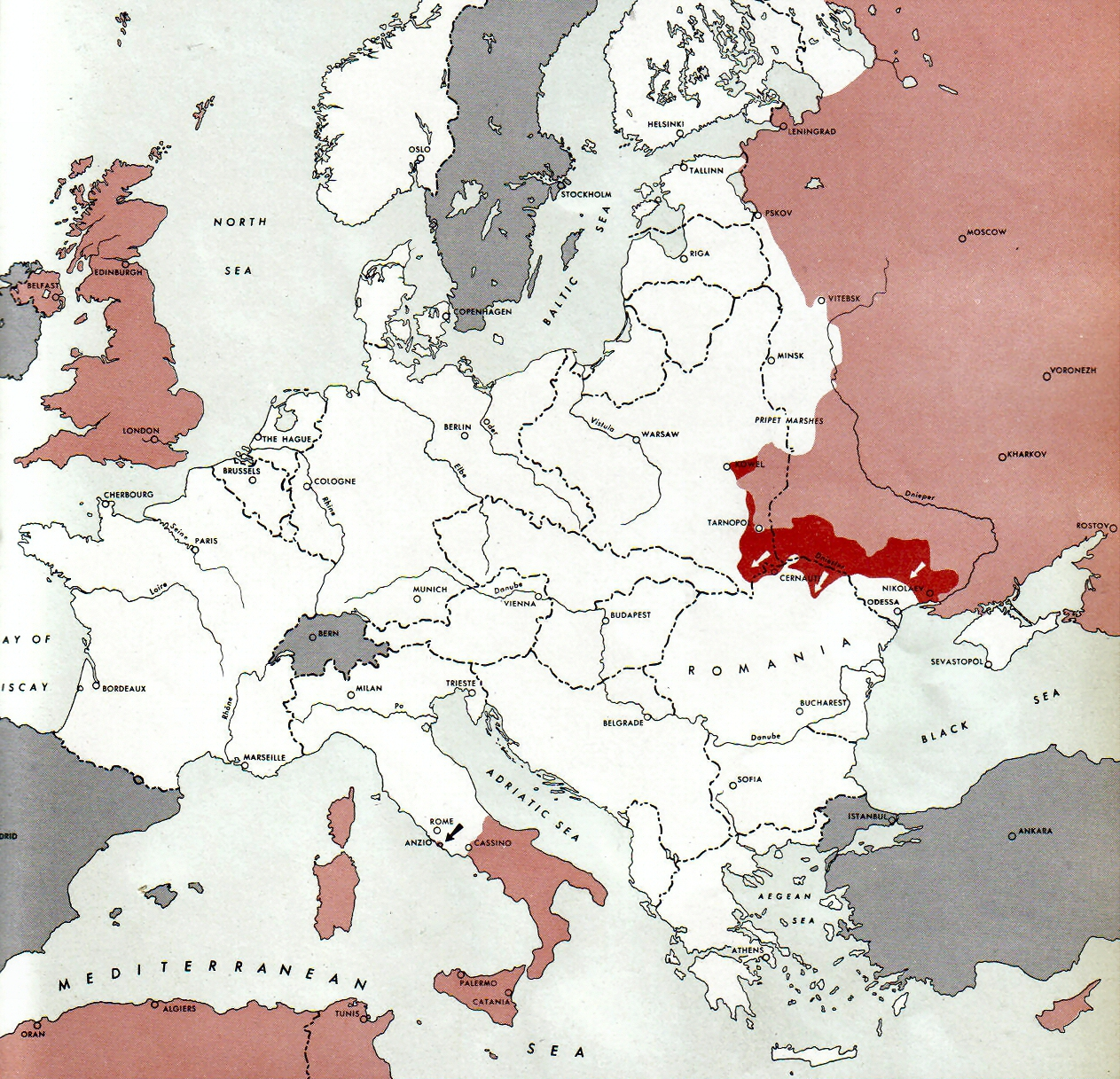
1st

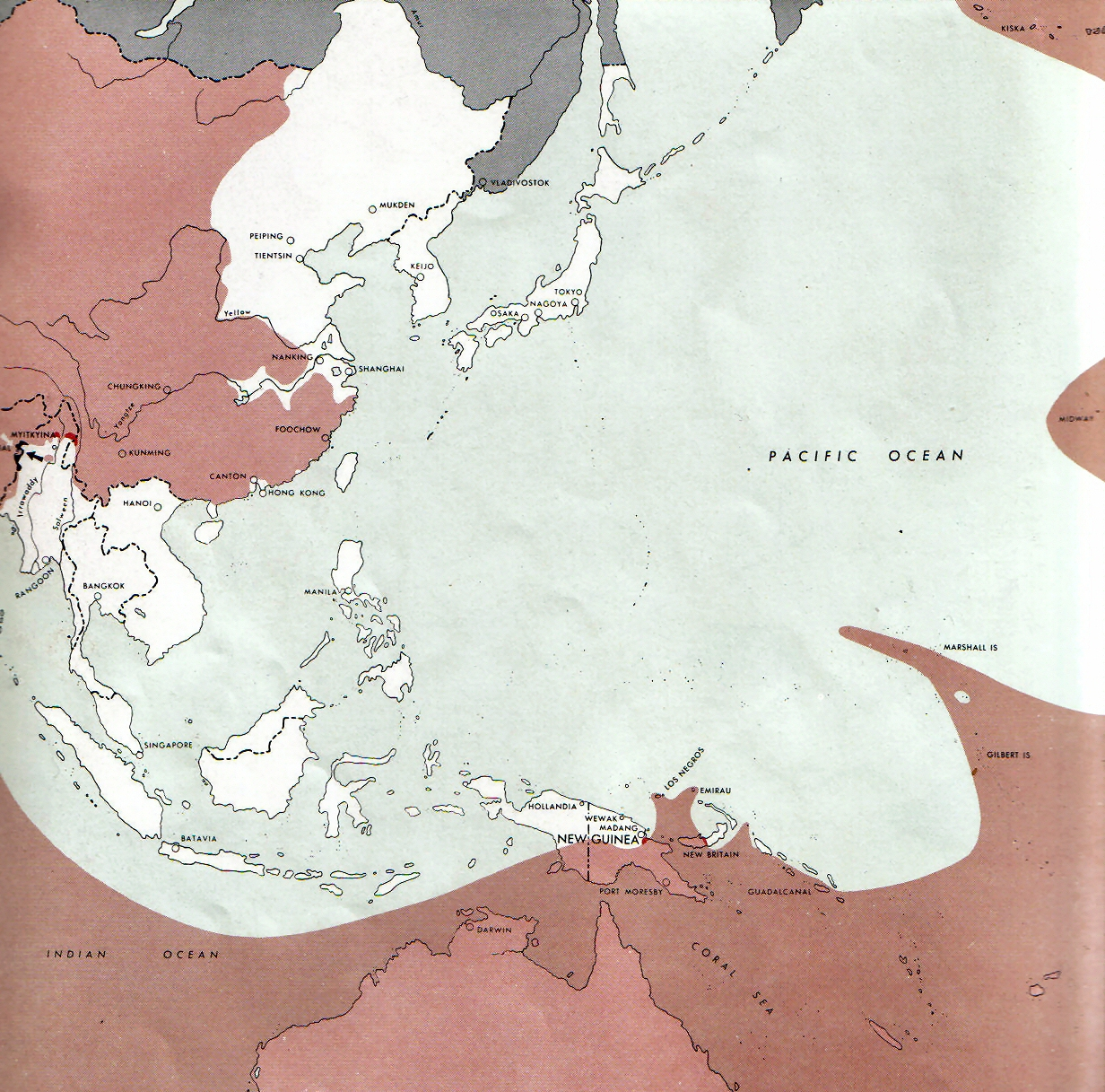
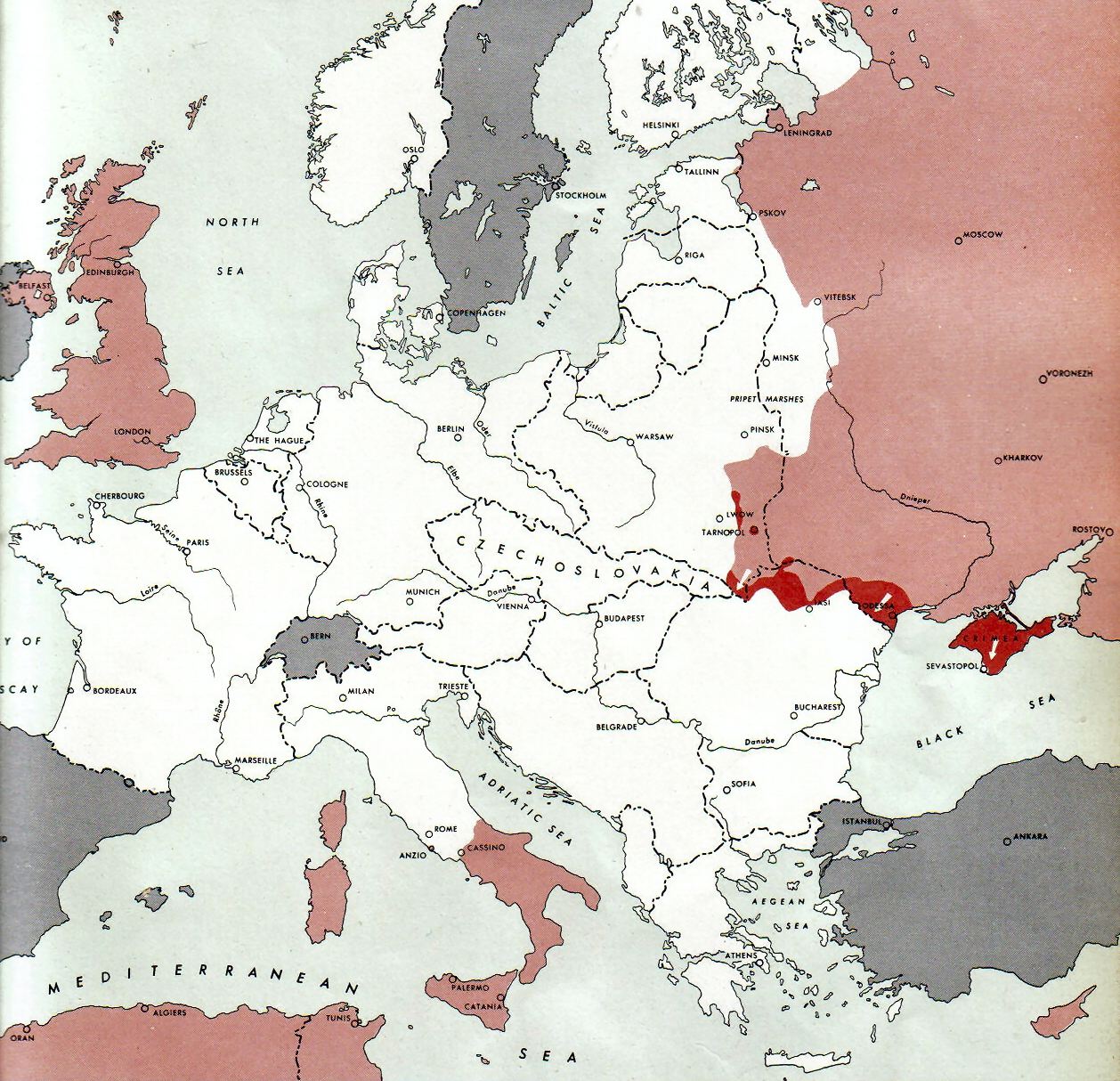
15th

3: Allied bombers hit Budapest in Hungary, now occupied by the Germans, and Bucharest in Romania, ahead of the advancing Red Army.

4: General Charles de Gaulle takes command of all Free French forces.

5: US Air Force bombs Ploiești oil fields in Romania, with heavy losses.

6: The Japanese drive on the Plain of Imphal, supposedly halted, proves strong enough to surround British forces at Imphal and Kohima, in India.

8: The Red Army attacks in an attempt to retake all of the Crimea, the Germans retreat westward to Sevastopol.

10: Soviet forces enter Odessa, Ukraine.

11: Soviet forces take Kerch, beginning the reconquest of Crimea.

15: Heavy air raids on Ploiești oil fields (Romania) by both the RAF and the US Air Force.

16: Soviet forces take Yalta; most of Crimea has been liberated.

17: Japanese launch Operation Ichi-Go with over 600,000 men in central China. The objective is to conquer areas where American bombers are located. The first phase is the Battle of Central Henan.

21: The Badoglio government in Italy falls and he is quickly asked to form another.
: An Allied air raid on Paris kills a large number of civilians.

22: Operations Reckless and Persecution: US troops land at Hollandia and Aitape in northern New Guinea to cut off Japanese forces in Wewak.

24: British troops force open the road from Imphal to Kohima in India.

25: LTG George Patton suffered yet another controversy setback, when giving a speech at the welcome Center in Knutsford, England. He opined that "the United States, Britain and the Soviet Union" were destined to rule the post-war world. A reporter's story the next day left out Soviet Union, and the Kremlin was offended; Patton was reprimanded by Eisenhower.

27: The Slapton Sands tragedy: hundreds of American soldiers and sailors are killed over two days in a training exercise in preparation for D-Day at Slapton in Devon.

30: Vast preparations for D-Day are going on all over southern England.
: American navy air raids continue in the Caroline Islands, including Truk.

== May ==
May 1944

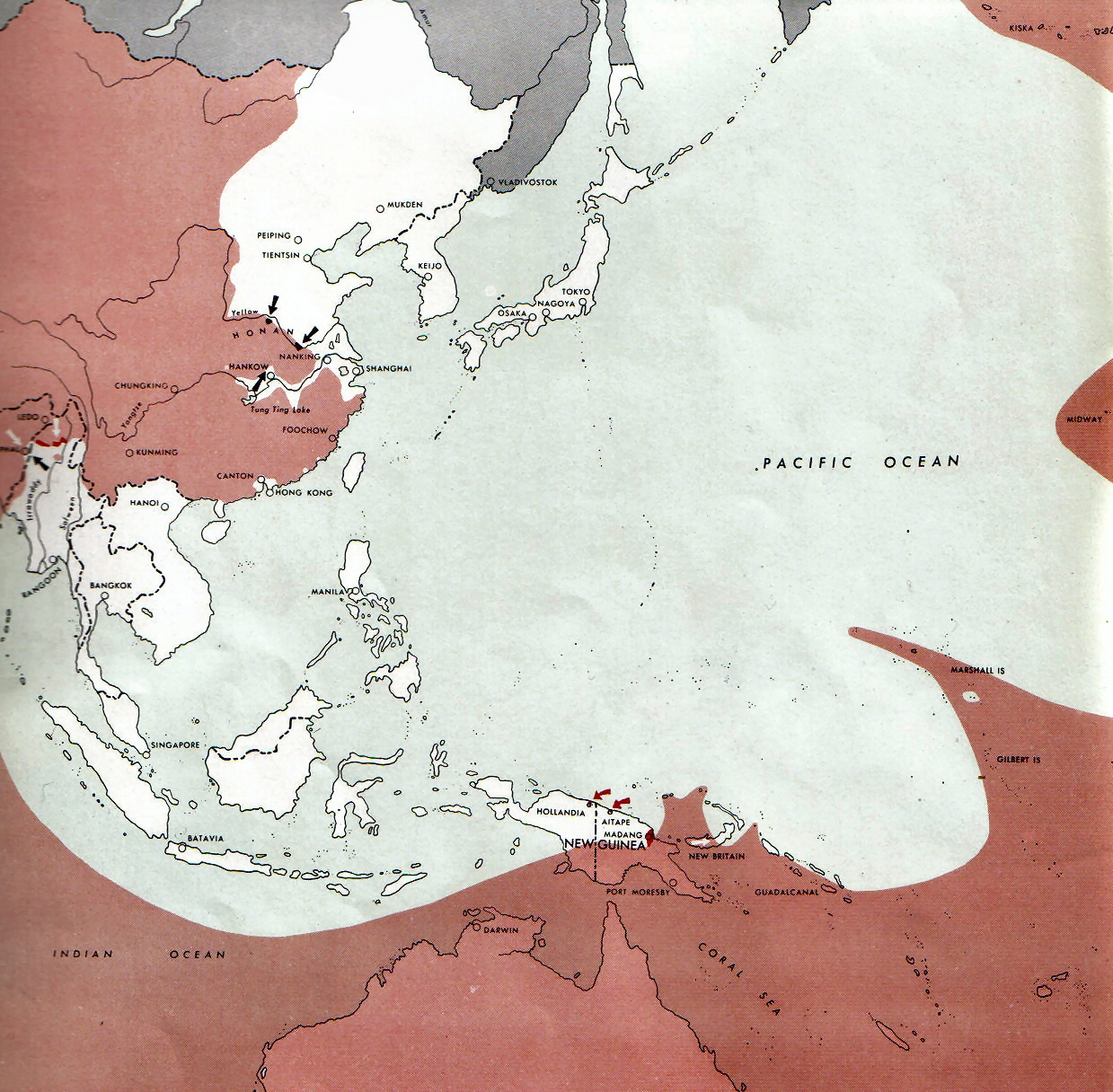
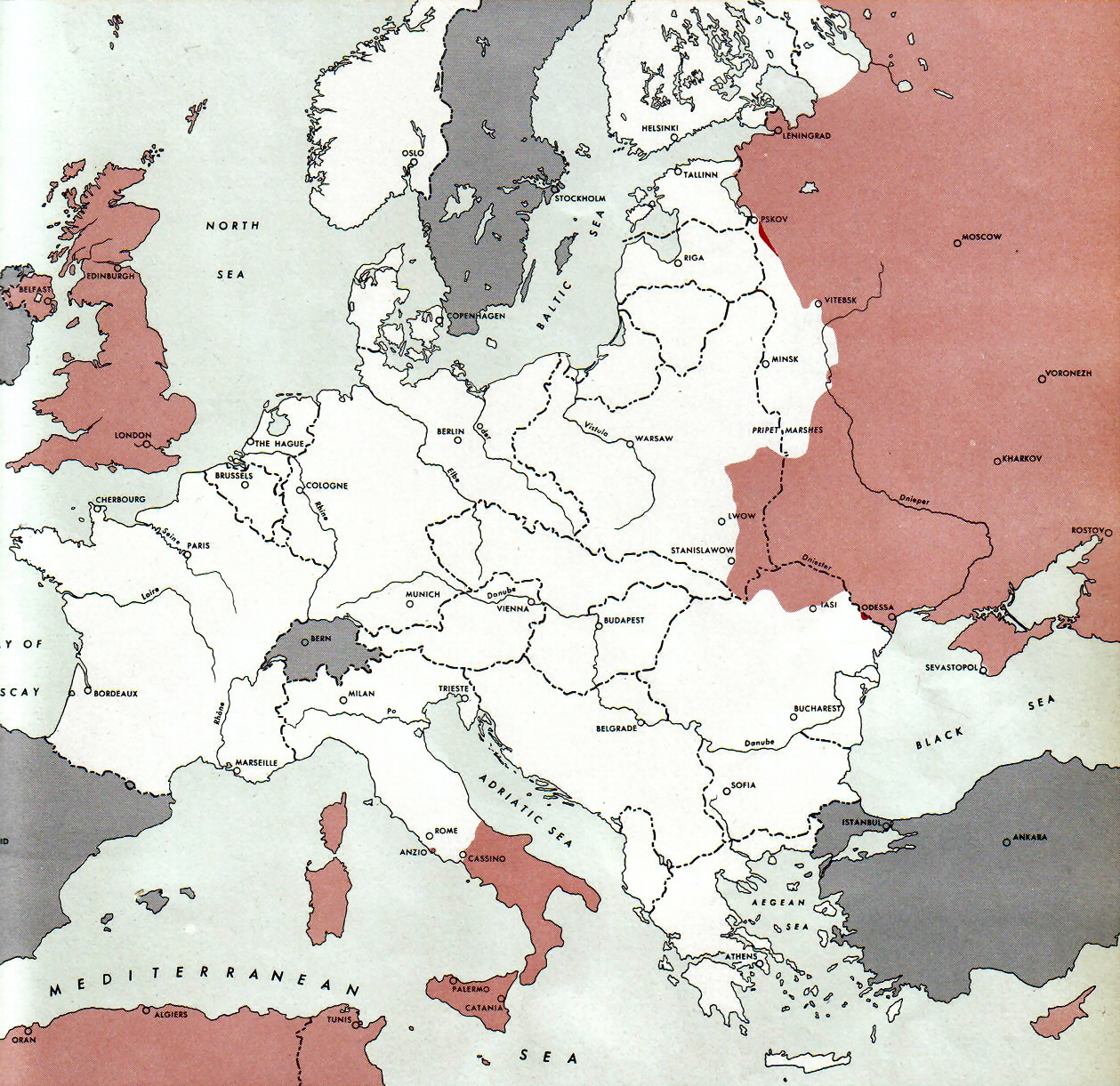
1st

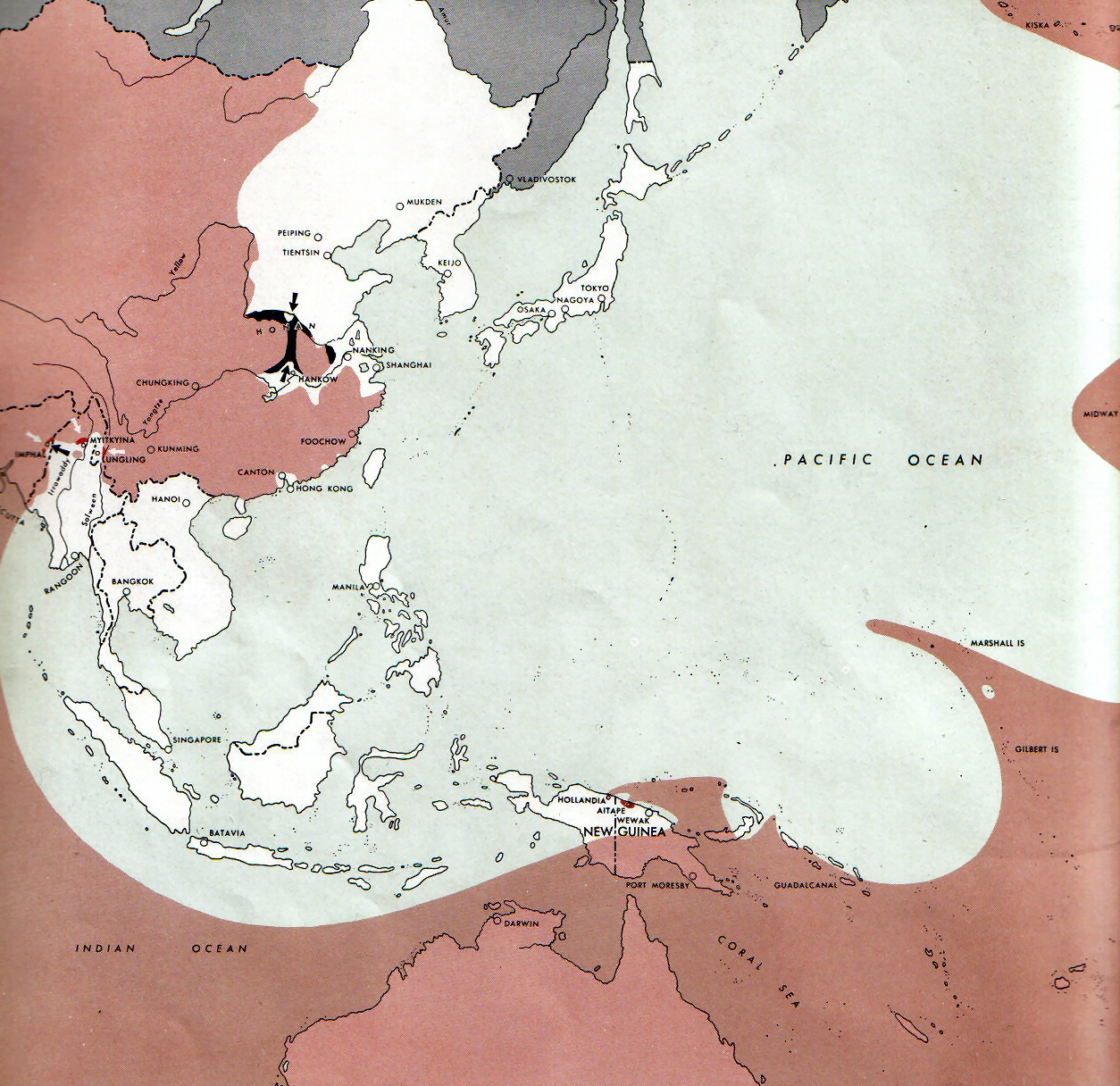
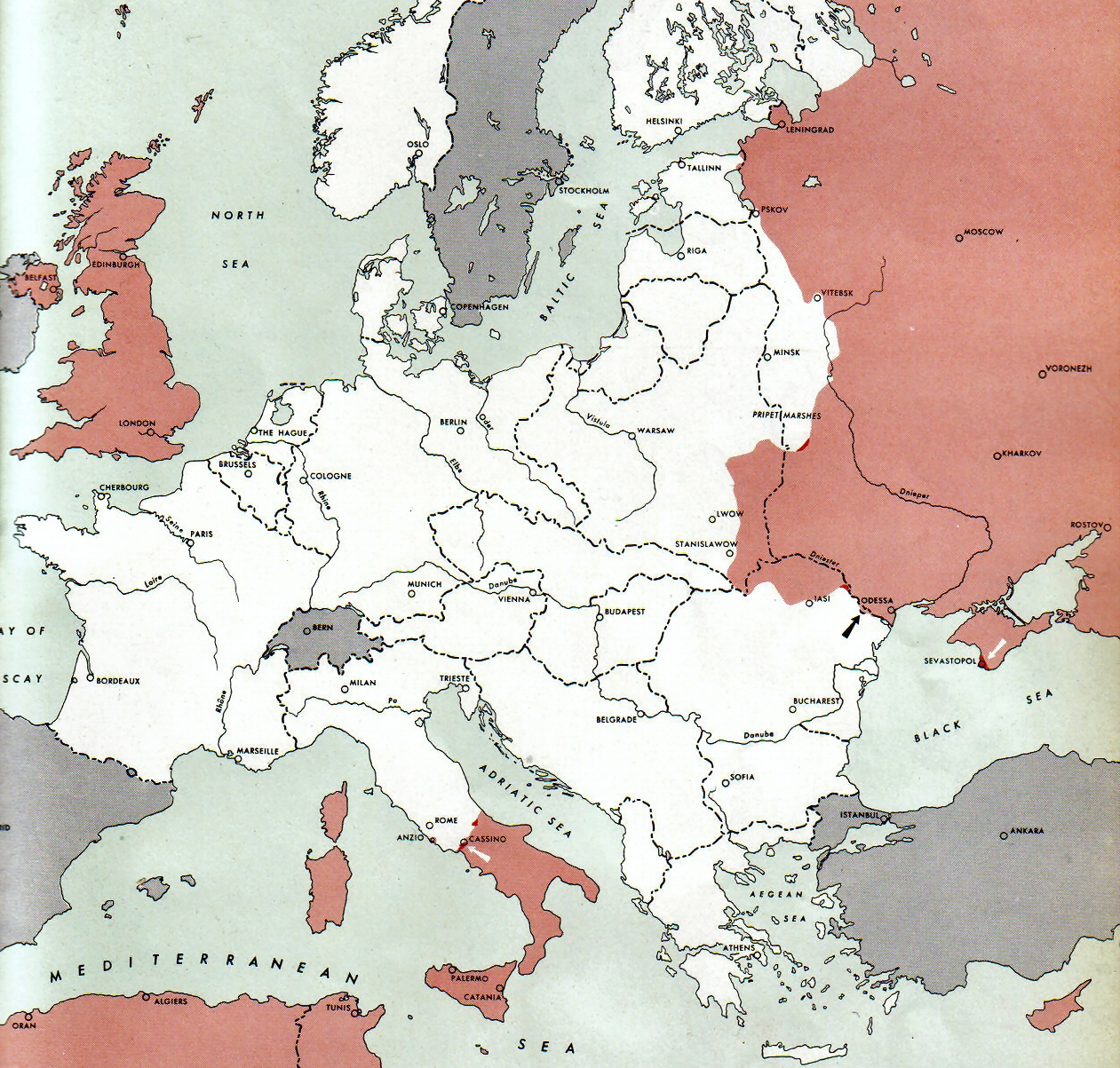
15th

6: Heavy Allied bombings of the Continent in preparation for D-Day.

8: D-Day for Operation Overlord set for 5 June.

9: Sevastopol in the Crimea is retaken by Soviet forces.

11: The fourth battle of Monte Cassino begins led by general Anders of the 2nd Polish Corps.

12: Large numbers of Chinese troops invade northern Burma.

13: The entirety of Crimea is under Soviet control. Many thousands of German and Romanian soldiers have been captured, but many thousands have been evacuated.
: The bridgehead over the Gari River is reinforced.

15: More than 130 Allied political leaders and military officers, including King George VI, British Prime Minister Winston Churchill, GEN Dwight D. Eisenhower, LTG George S. Patton, GEN Bernard L. Montgomery, and LTG John C. H. Lee met for the final joint briefing for D-Day at St. Paul's School in Hammersmith, west of London, England.

18: The Battle of Monte Cassino ends in Allied victory. Polish troops of the 2nd Polish Corps led by general Władysław Anders capture Monte Cassino. German troops in west Italy have withdrawn to the Hitler Line.
: Allied troops take airfields at Myitkyina, Burma, an important air base; the struggle over the city itself will continue for nearly three months.
: The last Japanese resistance in the Admiralty Islands, off New Guinea comes to an end.

21: Increased Allied bombing of targets in France in preparation for D-Day.

23: Allies start a new breakout from Anzio.

25: Allies at Anzio link up with Allies from south Italy. Though Harold Alexander wishes to trap the German Tenth Army, American Fifth Army commander Mark W. Clark orders Truscott to turn north toward Rome. The Germans in Italy form a new defensive position on the Caesar C line.

27: Operation Horlicks starts, as Americans land on Biak, Dutch New Guinea, a key Japanese air base; stubborn Japanese resistance until August.

31: The Japanese retreat from Imphal (India) with heavy losses; their invasion of India is over.

== June ==
June 1944

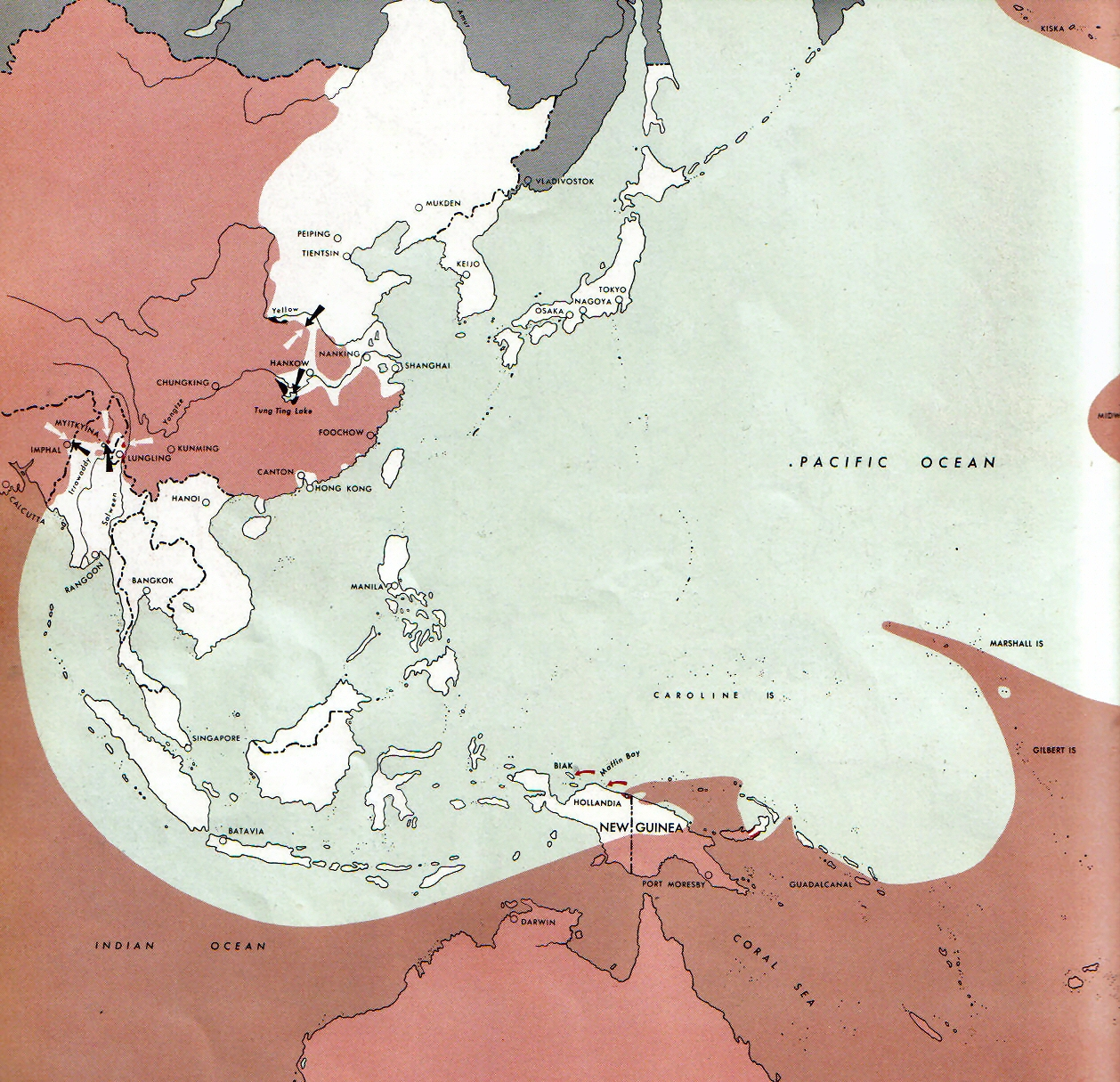
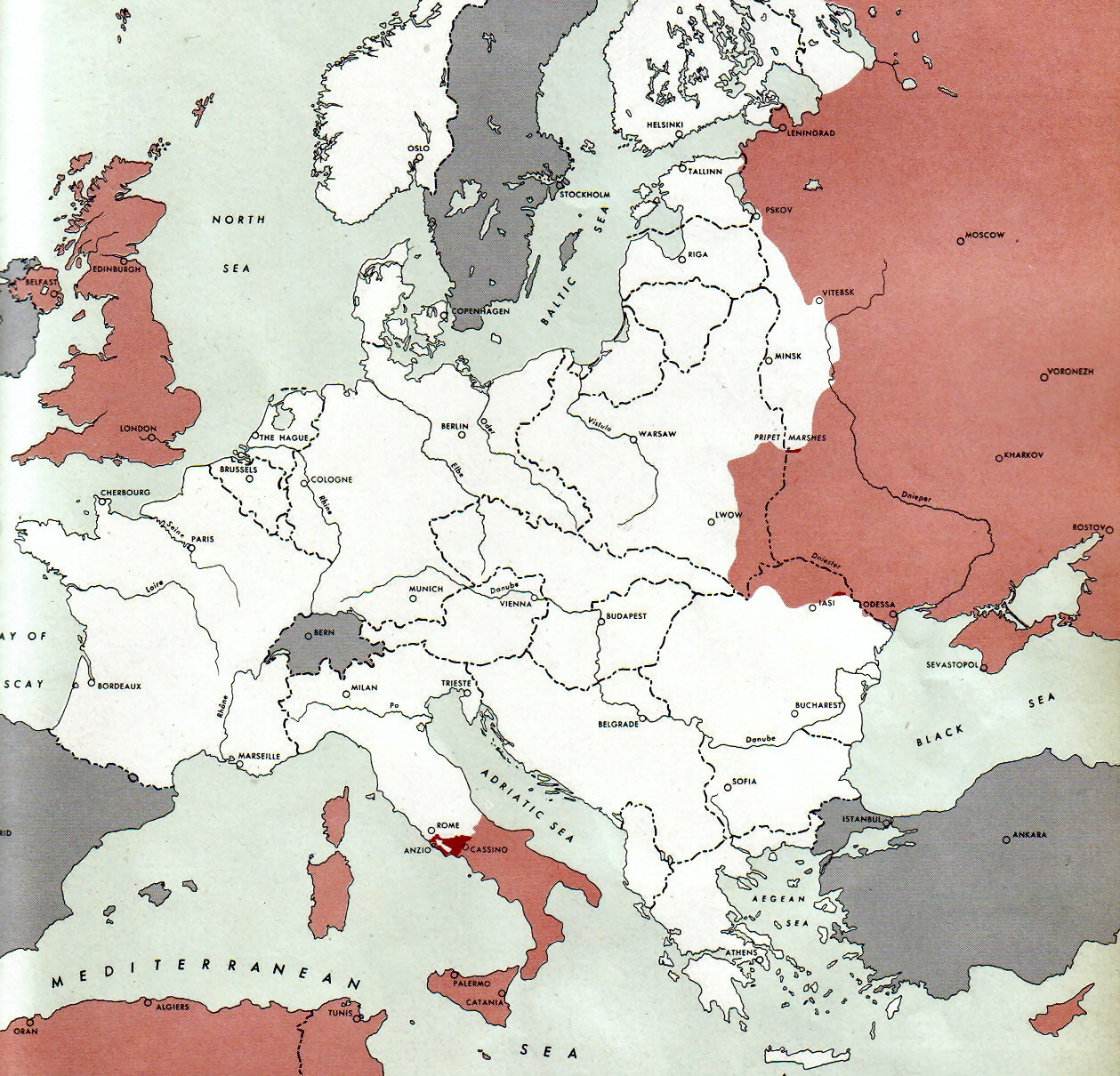
1st

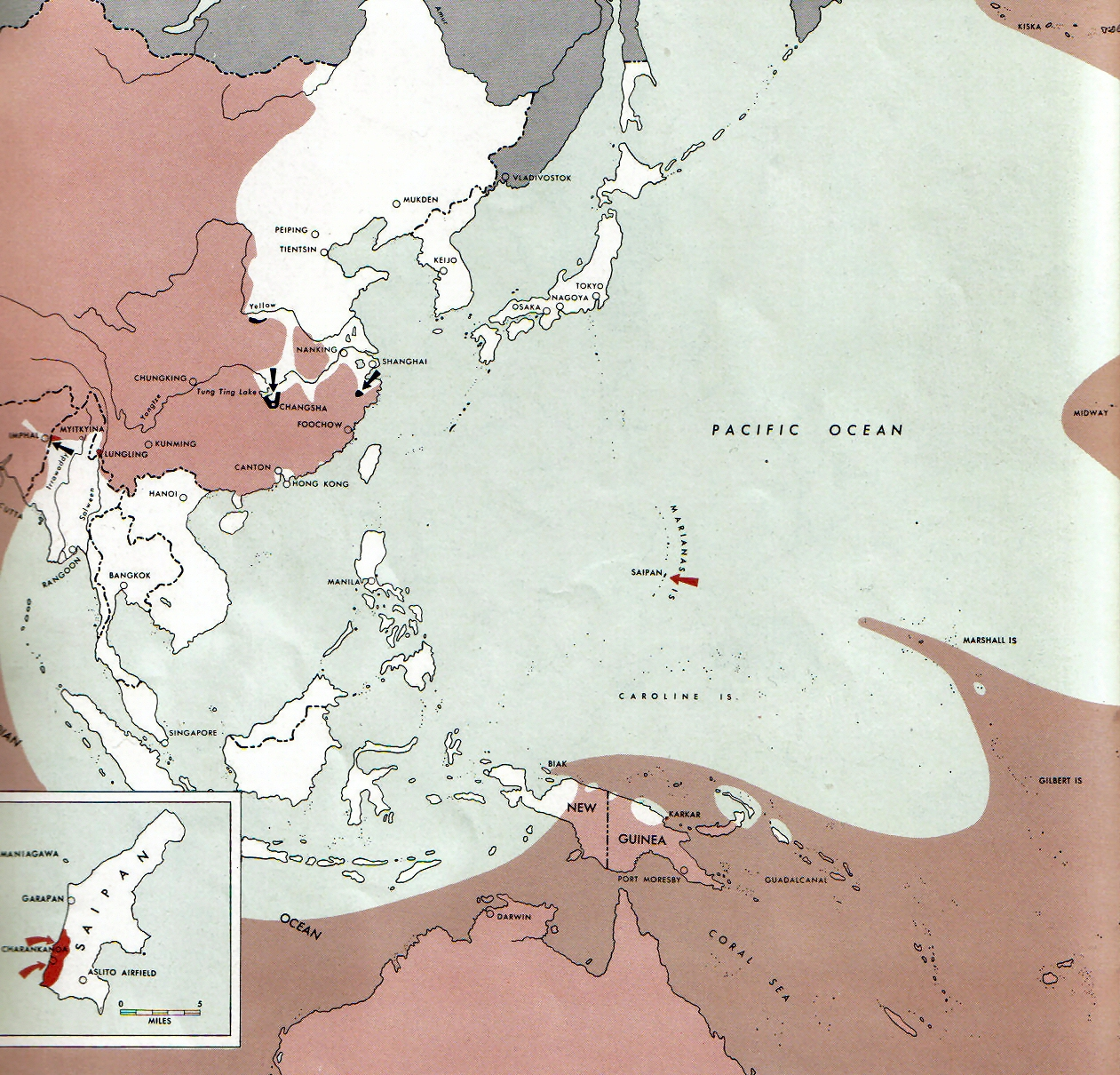
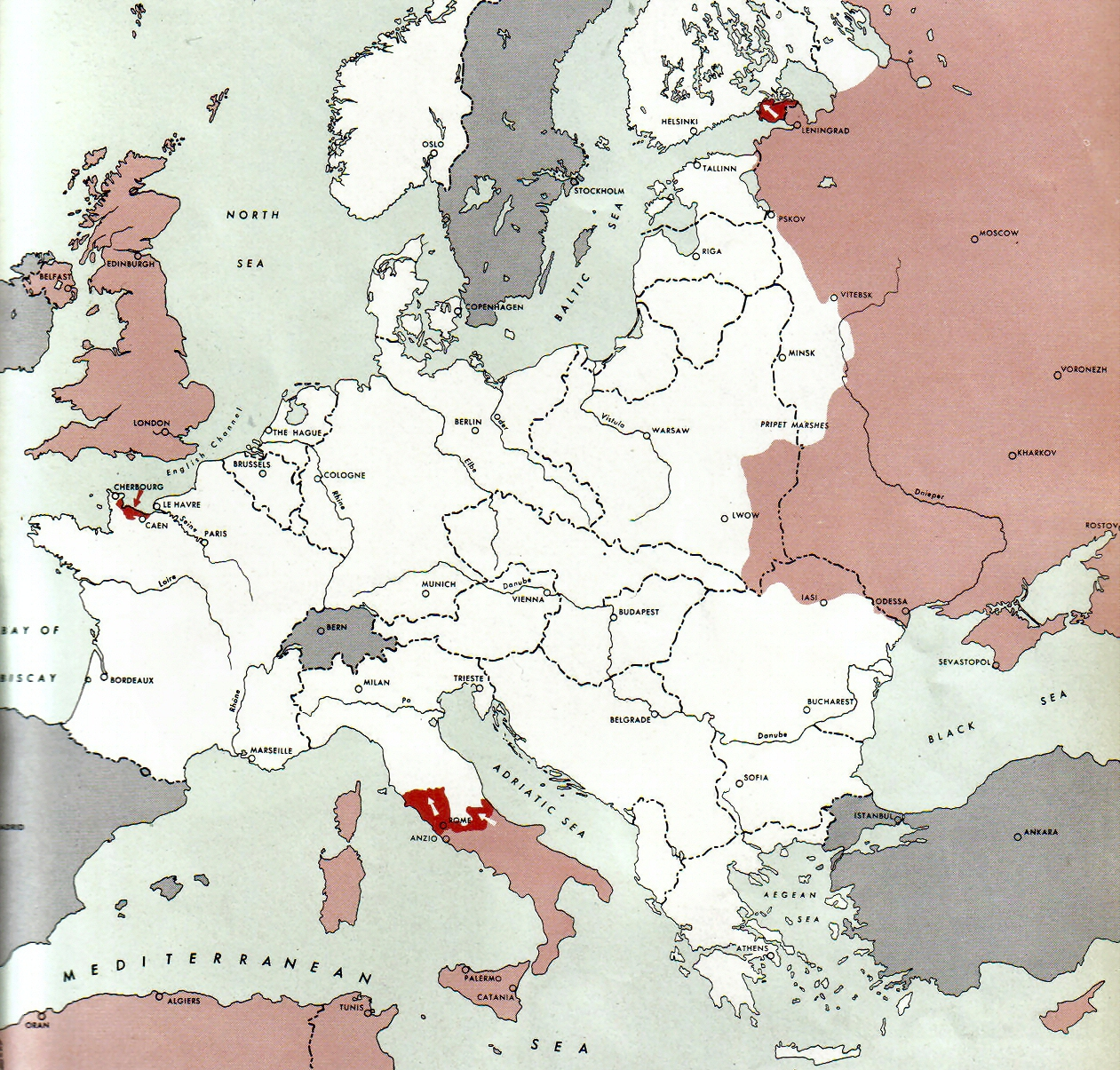
15th

2: The U.S. begins Operation Frantic with a bombing of Debrecen, Hungary.

3: There are daily bombings of the Cherbourg peninsula and the Normandy area.
: The provisional French government is established

4: Allies enter Rome, one day after the Germans declared it an open city. German troops fall back to the Trasimene Line.
: Operation Overlord is postponed 24 hours due to high seas. German U-505 is captured by US forces, and towed to Bermuda.

5: Operation Overlord commences when more than 1,000 British bombers drop 5,000 tons of bombs on German gun batteries on the Normandy coast in preparation for D-Day.
: The first Allied troops land in Normandy; paratroopers are scattered from Caen southward.
: In the Pacific, the U.S. fleet transporting the expeditionary forces for the invasion of Saipan in the Mariana Islands leaves Pearl Harbor.

6: D-Day begins with the landing of 155,000 Allied troops on the beaches of Normandy in France. The Allied soldiers quickly break through the Atlantic Wall and push inland in the largest amphibious military operation in history.

7: Bayeux is liberated by British troops.

9: No agreement having been reached on their mutual borders, Soviet forces launch an offensive against Finland with the intent of defeating Finland before pushing for Berlin.

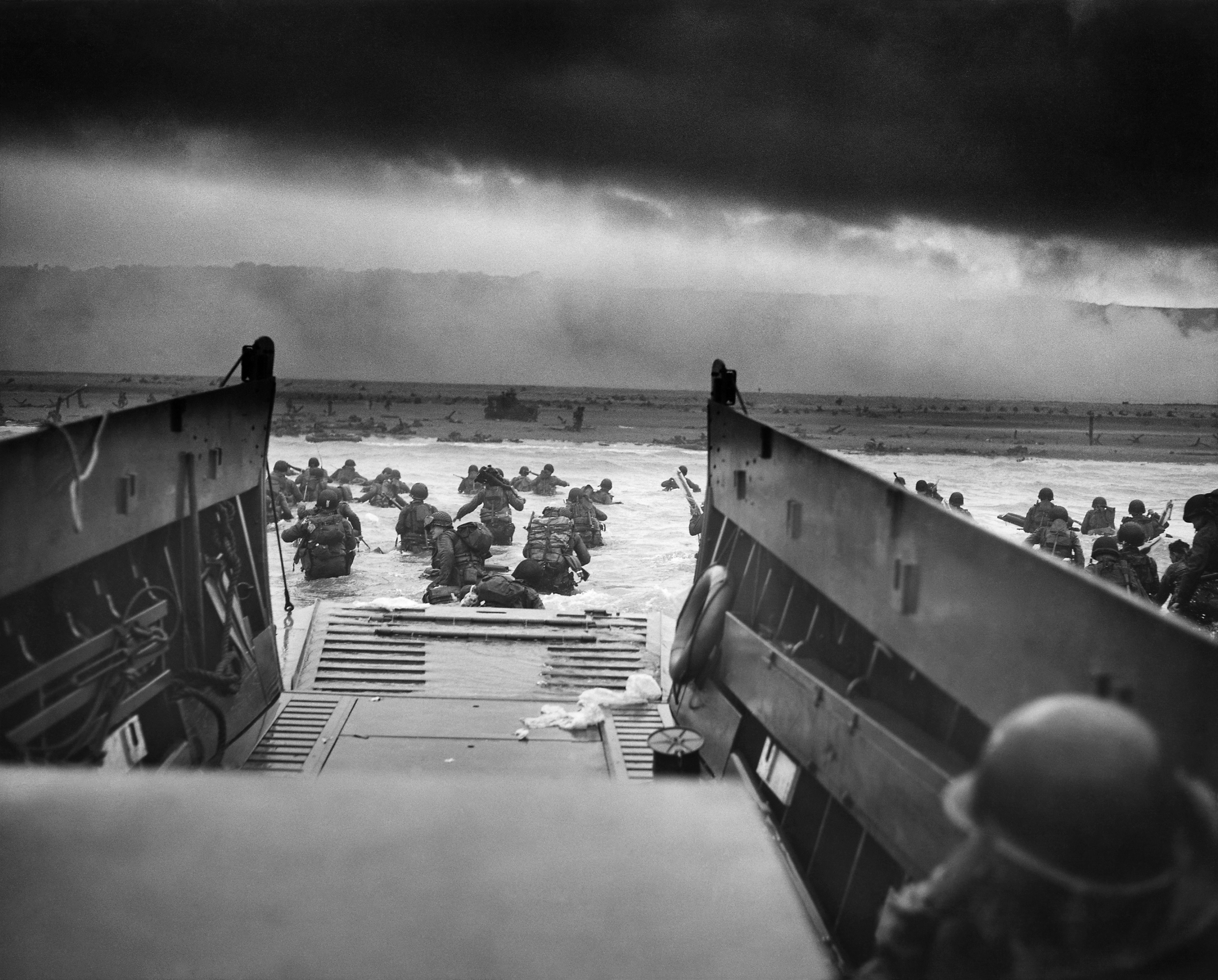
6 June 1944: A Navy LCVP disembarks troops at Omaha Beach.

10: At Oradour-sur-Glane (a town near Limoges), France, 642 men, women, and children are massacred in a German response to local Resistance activities.
: In the Distomo massacre in Greece, 218 civilians are killed.

12: American aircraft carriers commence air strikes on the Marianas, including Saipan, preparing for invasion.

13: Germany launches a V1 Flying Bomb attack on England, in Hitler's view a kind of revenge for the invasion. He believes in Germany's victory with this "secret weapon". The V-1 attacks will continue through October, when the last launch site is taken by Allied forces.
: The U.S. Naval bombardment of Saipan begins. In response, Admiral Toyoda Soemu, commander-in-chief of the Imperial Japanese Navy, orders his fleet to attack U.S. Navy forces around Saipan.

15: U.S. Marine and Army forces invade the island of Saipan. U.S. submarines sight the Japanese fleet en route.

17: Free French troops land on Elba.

18: Elba is declared liberated.
: Allies capture Assisi, Italy.

19-20: The Battle of the Philippine Sea, nicknamed the Great Marianas Turkey Shoot by Americans, takes place. The United States Fifth Fleet wins a decisive naval battle over the Imperial Japanese Navy near the Mariana Islands. Over 200 Japanese planes are shot down while the Americans only lose 29 to enemy action.

19: A severe Channel storm destroys one of the Allies' Mulberry harbours in Normandy.
: The Red Army prepares for "Operation Bagration", a huge offensive in Byelorussia (White Russia).

20: The British take Perugia, Italy.
: The Siege of Imphal is lifted after three months.

21: Allied offensive in Burma.

22: V-1s continue to hit England, especially London, sometimes with horrifying losses.
: Operation Bagration: General attack by Soviet forces to clear the German forces from Belarus This results in the destruction of the German Army Group Centre, possibly the greatest defeat of the Wehrmacht during World War II.
: In the Burma Campaign, the Battle of Kohima ends with a British victory.

23: The National Committee of the Republic of Estonia makes a declaration "to the Estonian People." The declaration was made public to the world press in Stockholm in July 1944 and in Tallinn on 1 August 1944.

25: The Battle of Tali-Ihantala between Finnish and Soviet troops begins. Largest battle ever to be fought in the Nordic countries.

26: Cherbourg is liberated by American troops.

27: San Marino is bombed by the Allies, under the belief that Axis forces had been stationed there

== July ==
July 1944

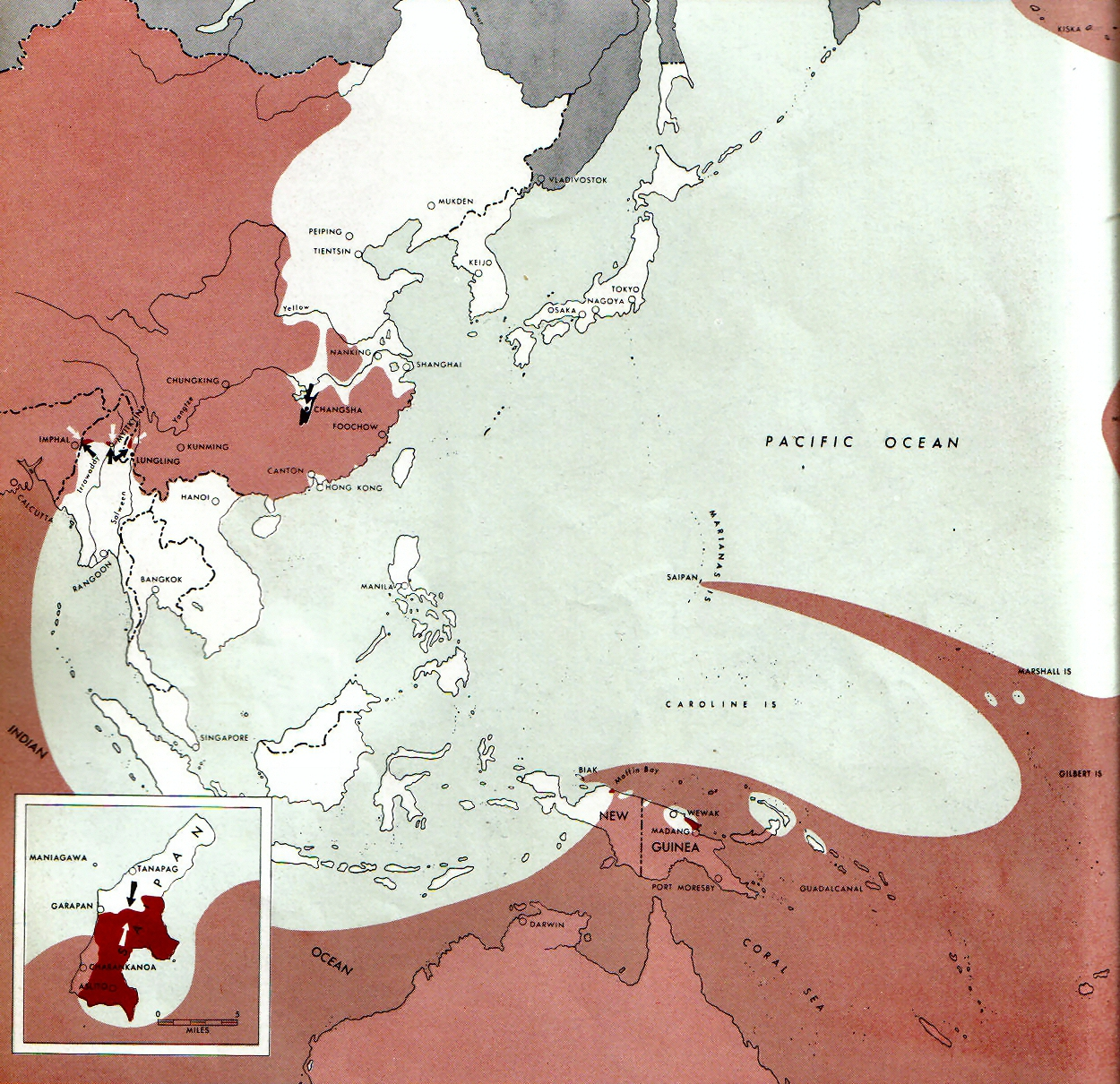
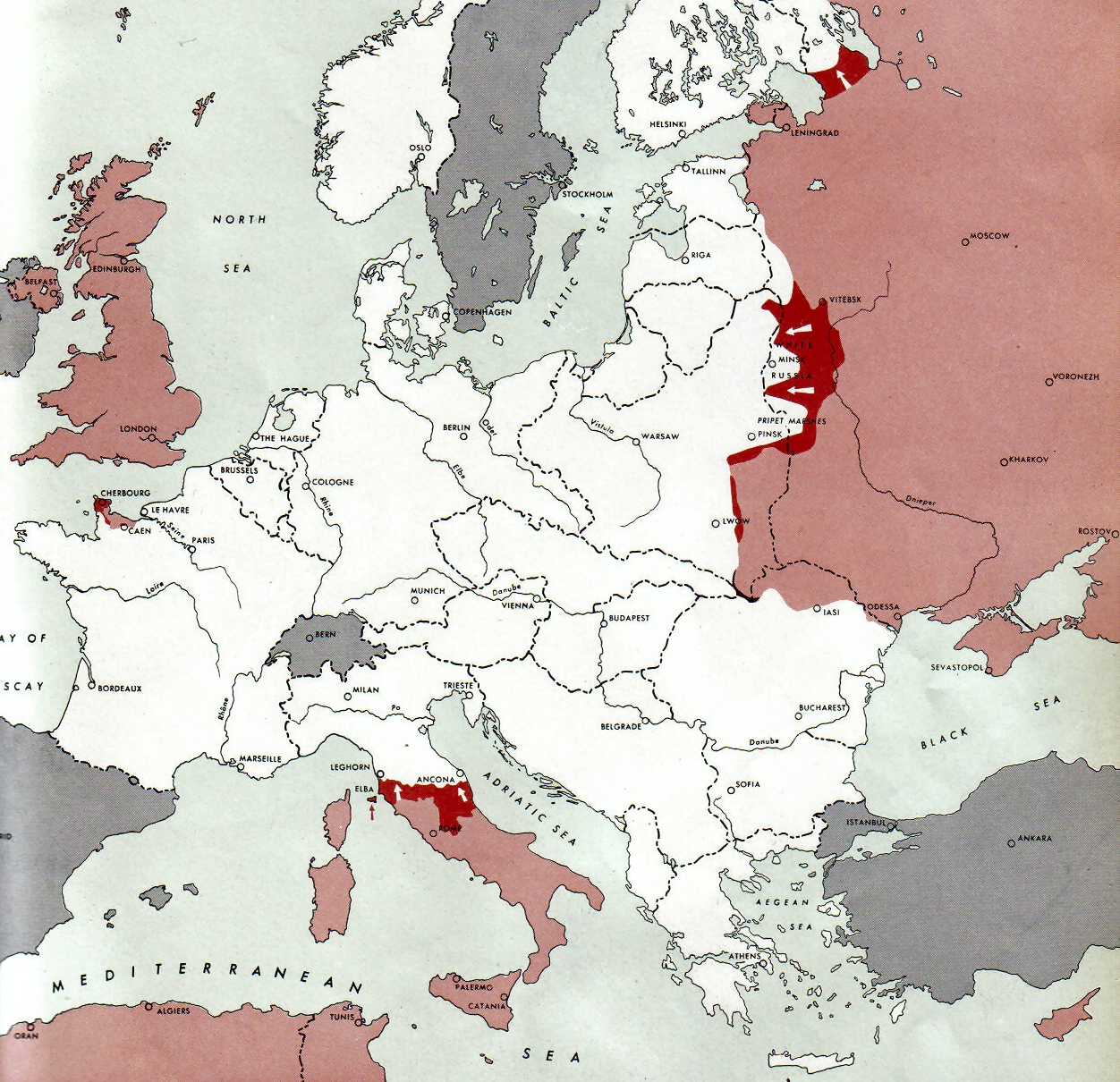
1st

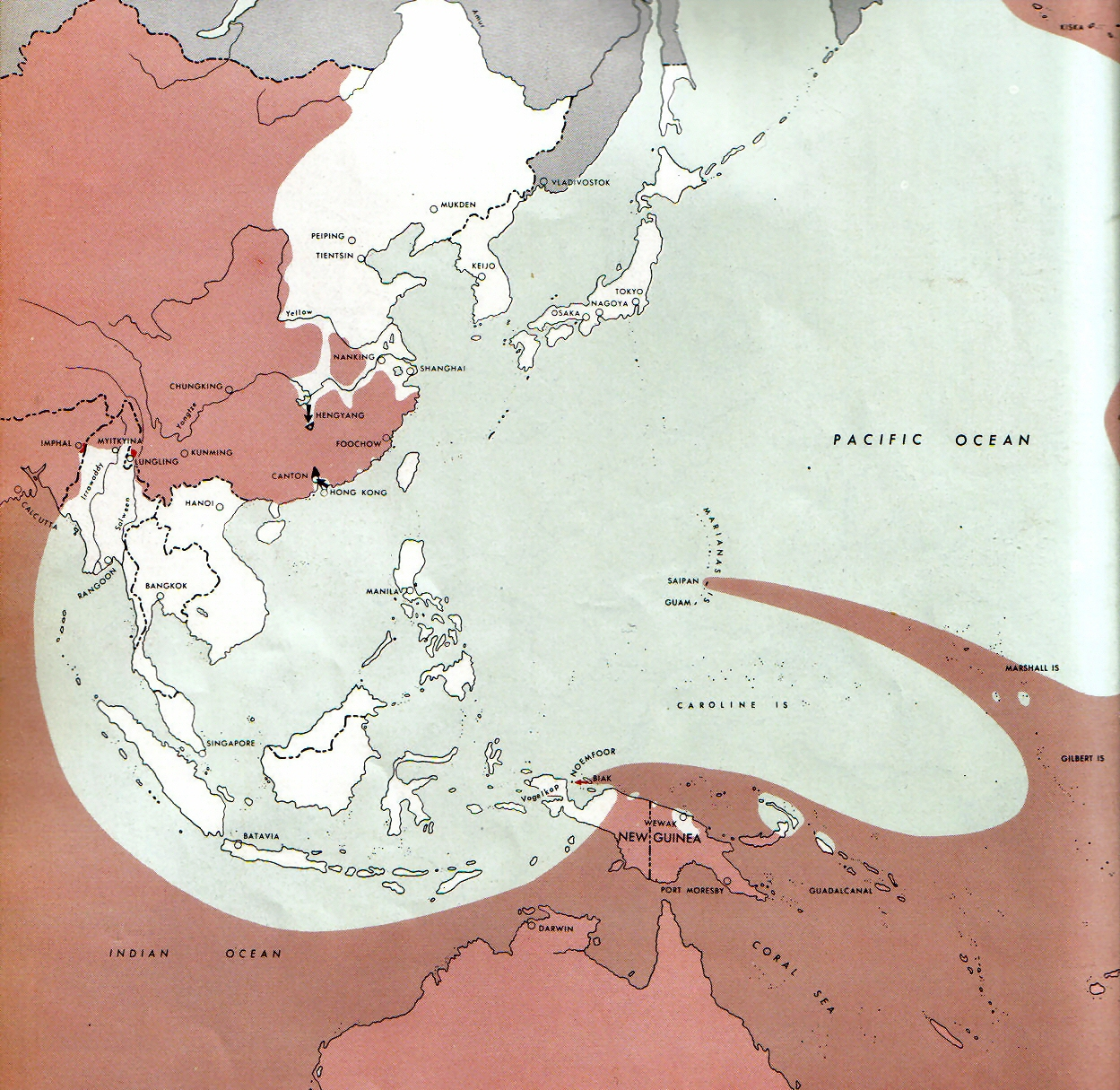
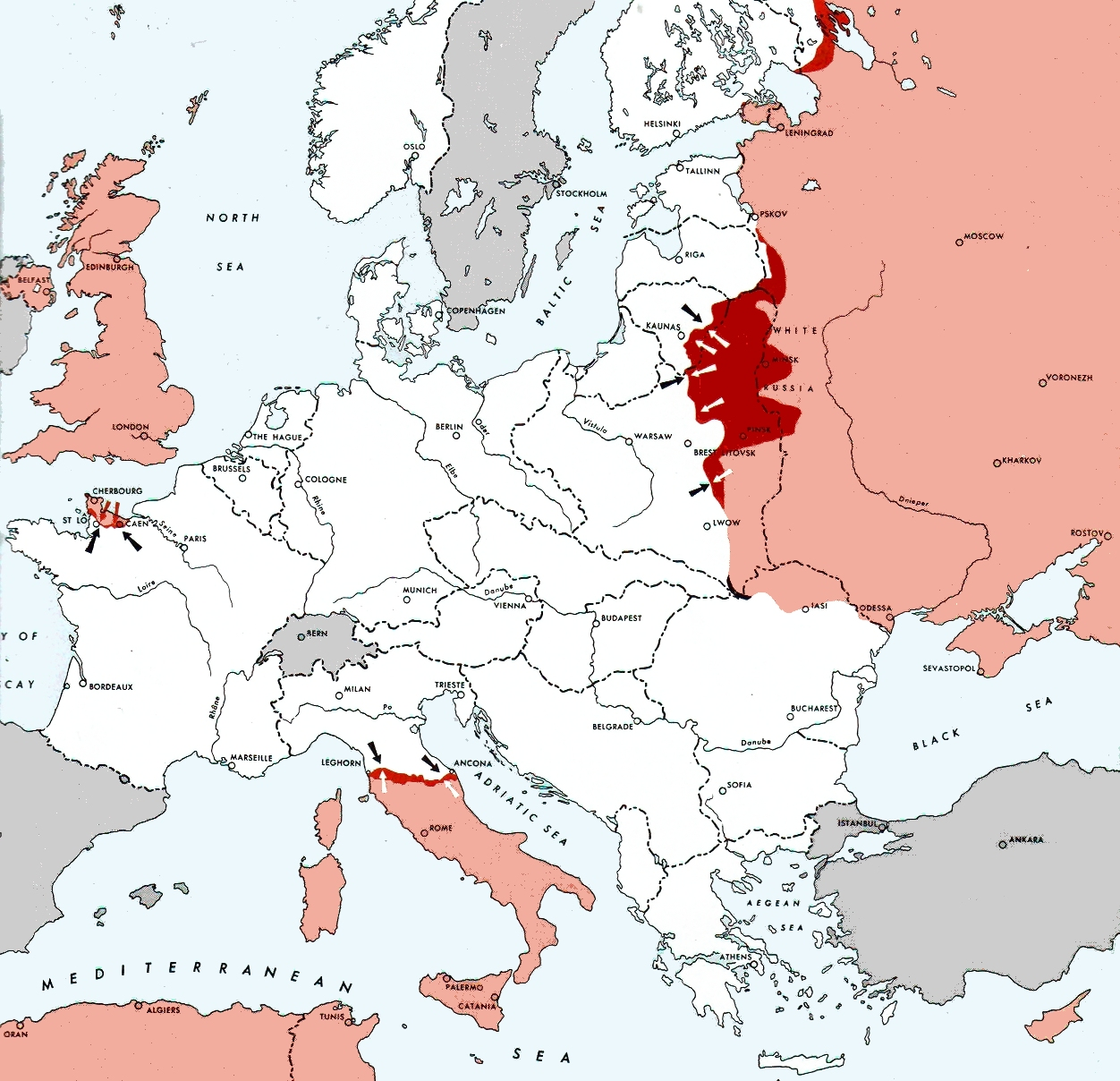
15th

1: The Leningrad diarist Tanya Savicheva dies of starvation at the age of 14. Her diary of her family's death during the siege becomes famous.

2: V-1s continue to have devastating effects in South-East England in terms of material destruction and losses of life.

3: Minsk in Belarus is liberated by Soviet forces.
: The Allies find themselves in the "battle of the hedgerows", as they are stymied by the agricultural hedges in Western France which intelligence had not properly evaluated. Various impromptu devices and inventions, often made out of cut-up German "hedgehog" shore-defense devices and mounted to Allied tanks, are designed and made to successfully deal with the matter.
: Siena, Italy falls to Algerian troops of the French forces.

6: Largest Banzai charge of the war: 4,300 Japanese troops are slaughtered on Saipan.

7: Soviet troops enter Vilnius, Lithuania.

9: After heavy resistance Caen, France, is liberated by the British troops on the left flank of the Allied advance.
: Saipan is declared secure, the Japanese having lost over 30,000 troops; in the last stages numerous civilians commit suicide with the encouragement of Japanese military.

10: Japanese are still resisting on New Guinea.
: Tokyo is bombed for the first time since the Doolittle raid of April 1942.

11: President Roosevelt announces that he will run for an unprecedented fourth term as U.S. President.

12: Hitler rejects General Field Marshal Walther Model's proposal to withdraw the German forces from Estonia and northern Latvia and retreat to the Daugava River.

13: The Soviets take Vilnius, Lithuania.
: The Lvov-Sandomierz Offensive begins.

16: First troops of the Brazilian Expeditionary Force (FEB) arrive in Italy.

17: Field Marshal Rommel is badly wounded when his car is strafed from the air in France.

18: General Hideki Tojo resigns as chief minister of the Japanese government as the defeats of the Japanese military forces continue to mount. Emperor Hirohito asks General Kuniaki Koiso to form a new government.
: Saint-Lô, France is taken, and the Allied breakout from hedgerow country in Normandy begins.

19: American forces take Leghorn (Livorno), Italy far up the Italian boot.

20: The July 20 Plot is carried out by Col. Claus von Stauffenberg in a failed attempt to assassinate Hitler. Hitler was visiting headquarters at Rastenburg, East Prussia. Reprisals follow against the plotters and their families, and even include Rommel.

21: US Marines land on Guam.

22: Hitler gives permission to retreat from the Narva River to the Tannenberg defence line in the Sinimäed Hills 20 km west from Narva.

23: The Poles rise up against the Germans in the Lwow Uprising.

24: Marines land on Tinian Island, last of the Marianas (after Saipan and Guam); Tinian will eventually be a B-29 base, and the base from which the atomic bombers departed.
: Operation Cobra is now in full swing: the breakout at St. Lô in Normandy with American troops taking Coutances.
: At the start of the Soviet Narva Offensive, July 24–30, the Soviet 8th Army is beaten by the Estonian 45th Regiment and East Prussian 44th Regiment. The army detachment "Narwa" begins to retreat to the Tannenberg line.
: Majdanek concentration camp is liberated by Soviet forces, the first among many. The Soviet Union is now in control of several large cities in Poland, including Lublin.
: US bombers mistakenly bomb American troops near St. Lô, France.

26: The first aerial victory for a jet fighter occurs, with an Me 262 of the Luftwaffe's Ekdo 262 damaging a de Havilland Mosquito reconnaissance aircraft of the Royal Air Force's No. 540 Squadron RAF.
: The Leningrad Front's Narva Offensive captures the town.

27 July to 10 August: Battles on the Tannenberg Line. At the start of the battles there are 25 Estonian and 24 Dutch, Danish and Flemish infantry battalions on the German side at the Narva Front. The artillery forces, and the tank, engineer and other special units are composed mainly of Germans. The attack by the Soviet Armed Forces is stopped, tens of thousands of men are killed on both sides.

28: The Red Army take Brest-Litovsk.
: The first operational use of the Me 163B Komet rocket fighter occurs by units of JG 400 in defense of the Leuna synthetic fuel facilities, the Third Reich's largest synthetic fuels complex.

29: A decisive day in the Battle of Narva, allowing the German army detachment "Narwa", including Estonian conscript formations to delay the Soviet Baltic Offensive for another one and a half months.

== August ==
August 1944

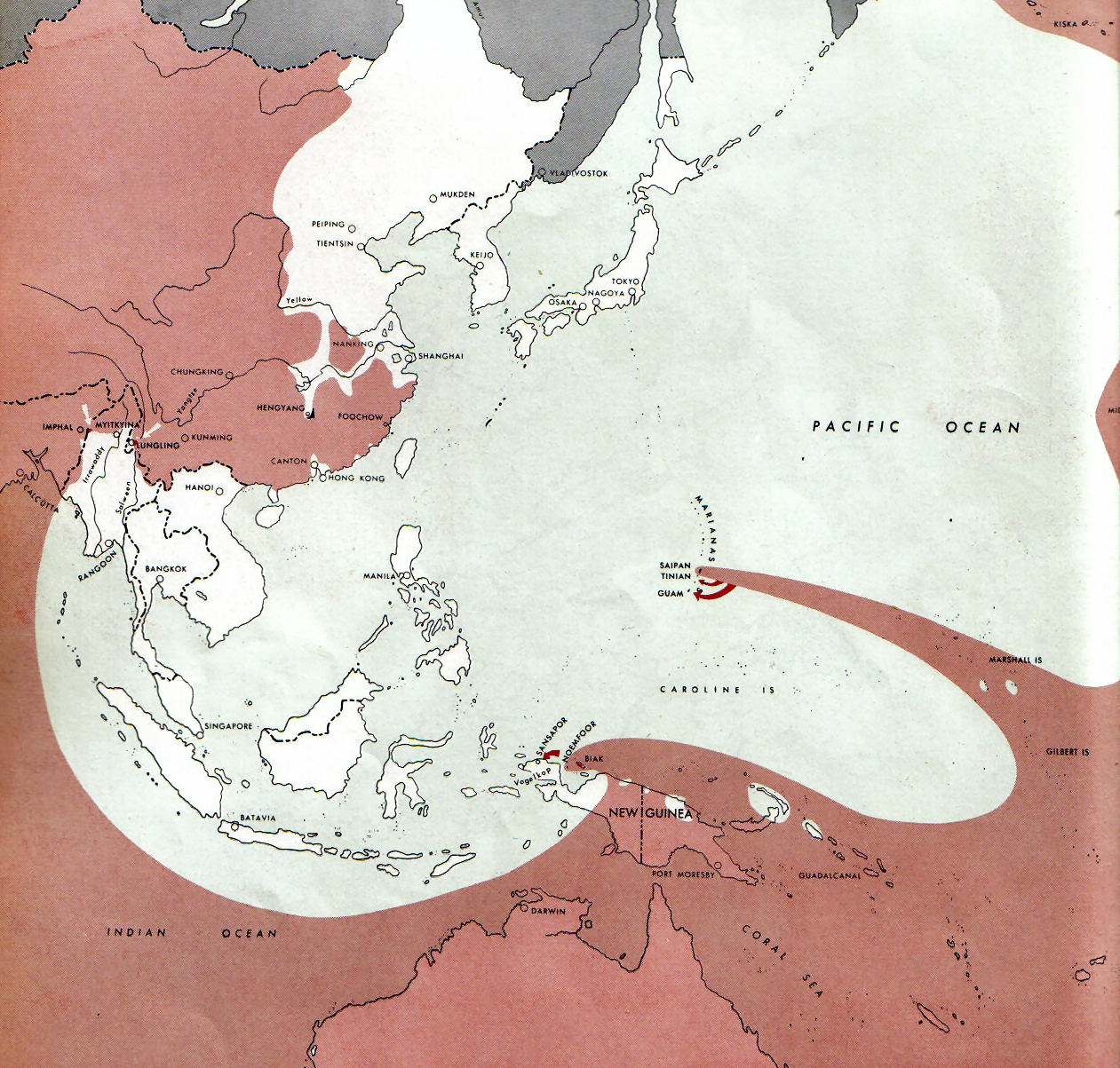
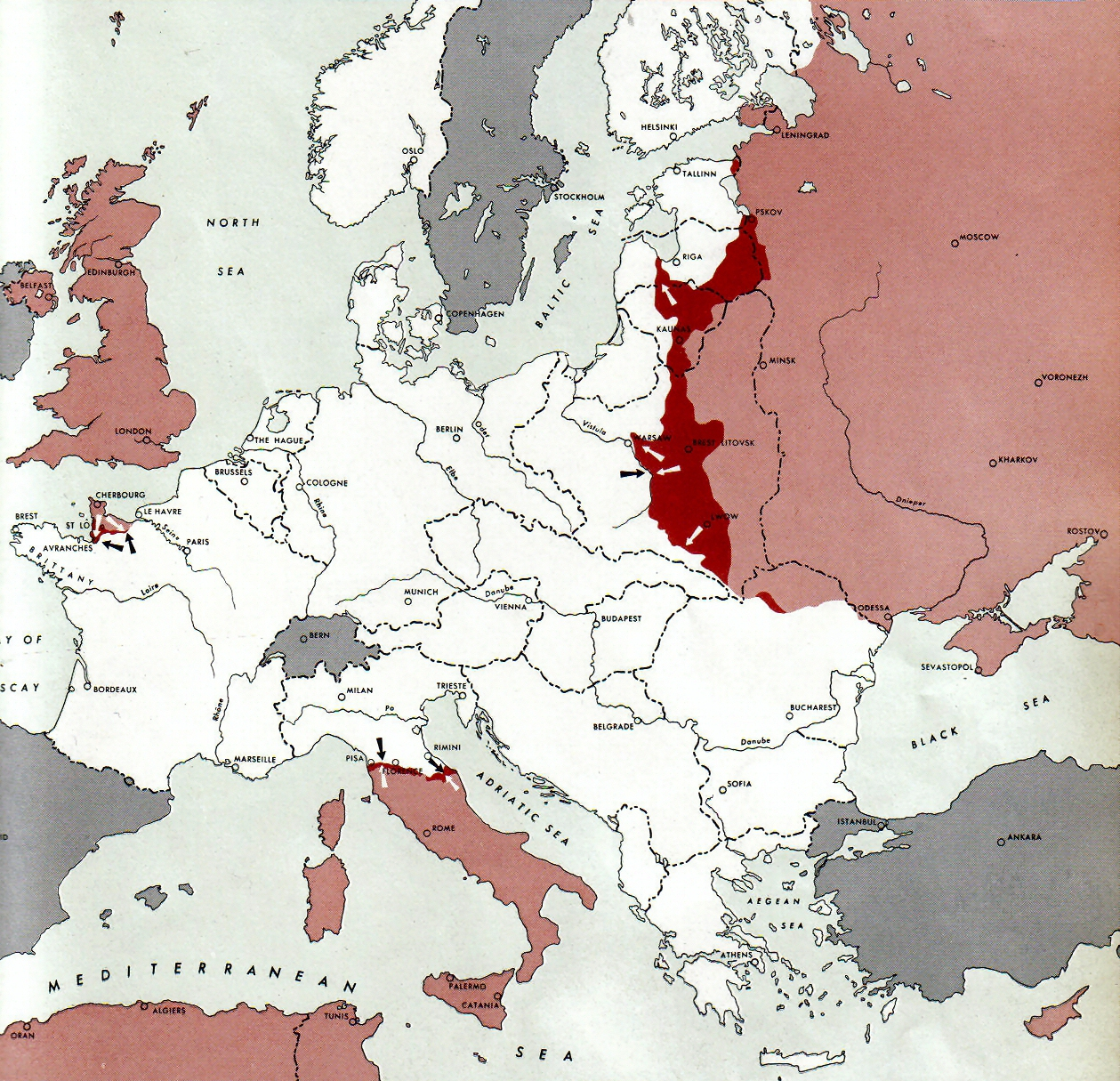
1st

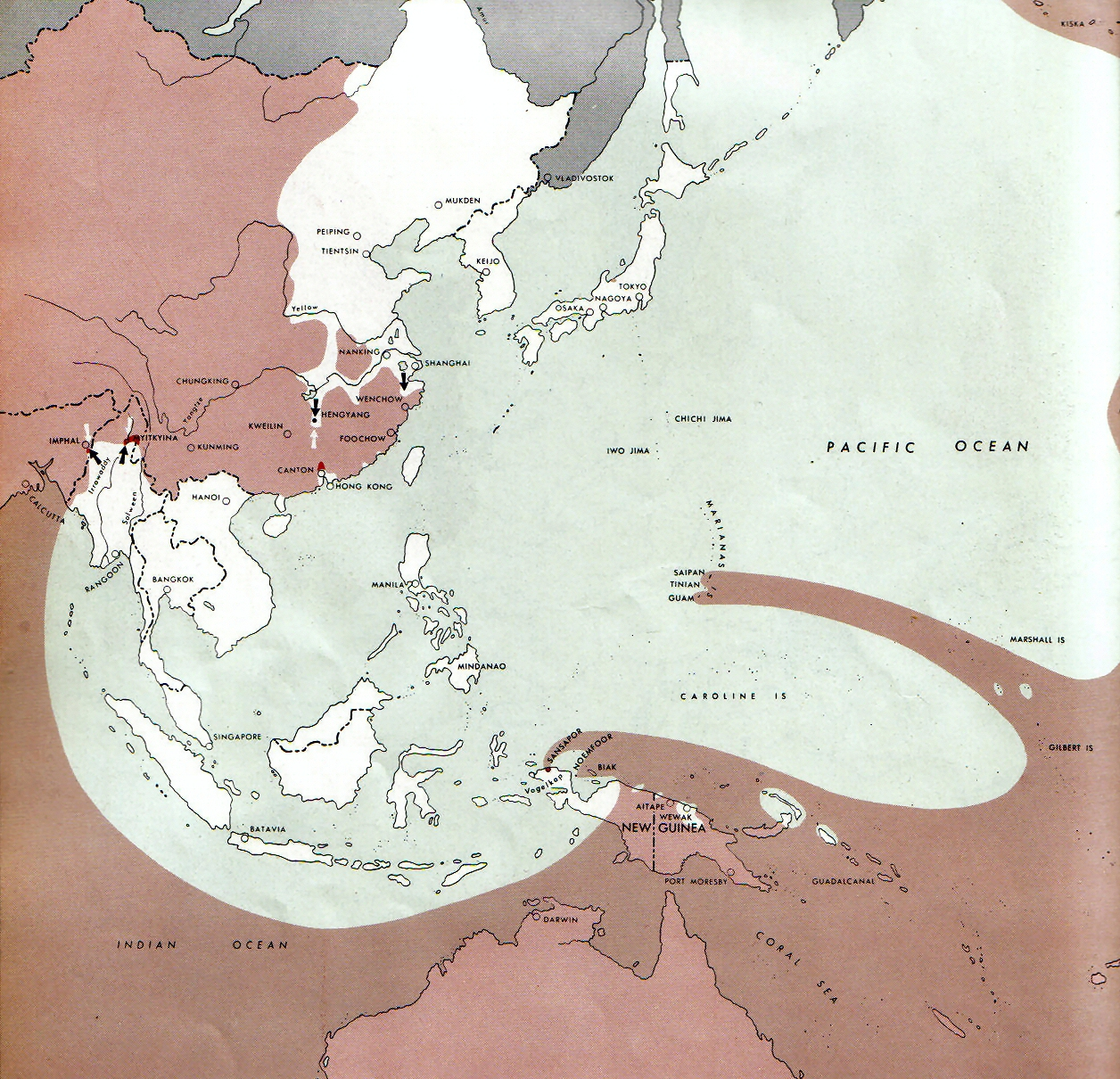
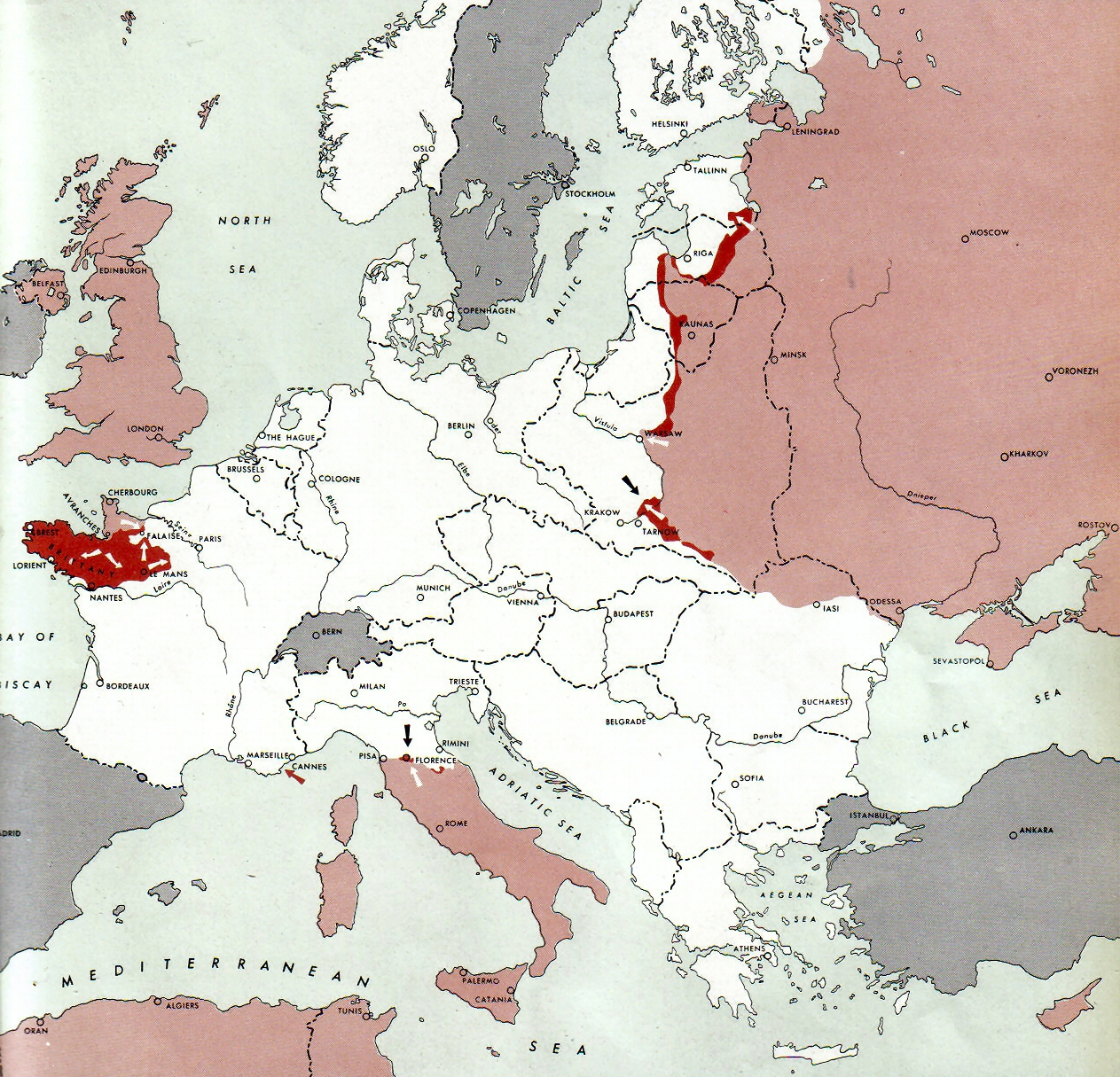
15th

1: The Warsaw Uprising, staged by the Polish Home Army, begins: the Polish people rise up, expecting aid from the approaching Soviet Union armies, but it never comes.
: The Red Army isolates the Baltic States from East Prussia by taking Kaunas.
: The Americans complete the capture of the island of Tinian.

3: Allied U.S. and Chinese troops under Stilwell overcome a vigorous Japanese defense and take Myitkyina, in northern Burma.

4: Florence is liberated by the Allies, particularly British and South African troops. Before exiting, the Germans under General Albert Kesselring destroy some historic bridges and historically valuable buildings.
: Rennes, France, is liberated by American forces.

5: Wola massacre: 40-50 thousand civilians murdered by German and collaborating Russian forces in the Wola district of Warsaw.
:The Cowra breakout: Japanese POWs escape from an Australian prison near Cowra, New South Wales. Two guards are killed and posthumously awarded the George Cross.

6: Germans round up young men in Kraków to stop the potential Kraków Uprising (1944).
: Ukrainian insurgents kill 42 Polish civilians in the Baligród massacre.

7: First trials of the bomb conspirators against Hitler begin in a court presided over by notorious Judge Roland Freisler.

8: Plotters in the bomb plot against Hitler are hanged and their bodies hung on meat hooks. Reprisals against their families continue.

9: President Roosevelt chooses General Douglas MacArthur's plan to invade the Philippines and turns down Admiral Chester W. Nimitz's plan to invade Taiwan.

10: Guam is liberated by American troops; all of the Marianas are now in American hands. They will be turned into a major air and naval centre against the Japanese homeland.
:USAAF bombers attack Palembang in the Dutch East Indies

14: The failure of the Allies to close the Falaise pocket in France proves advantageous to the Germans fleeing to the east who escape the pincer movement of the Allies.
: A clash between Italian POWs and American servicemen ends in the Fort Lawton Riot

15: Operation Dragoon begins, marked by amphibious Allied landings in southern France.
: The Allies reach the "Gothic Line", the last German strategic position in North Italy.

18: Following the assassination of a collaborationist politician in Belgium by the resistance, 20 civilians are massacred in Courcelles by paramilitaries in retaliation.
: The Red Army reaches the East Prussian border.

19: The French Resistance begins an uprising in Paris, partly inspired by the Allied approach to the Seine River.
: In a radio broadcast, Jüri Uluots, the acting Head of State of Estonia, calls the Estonian conscripts to hold the Soviet Armed Forces back until a peace treaty with Germany is signed.

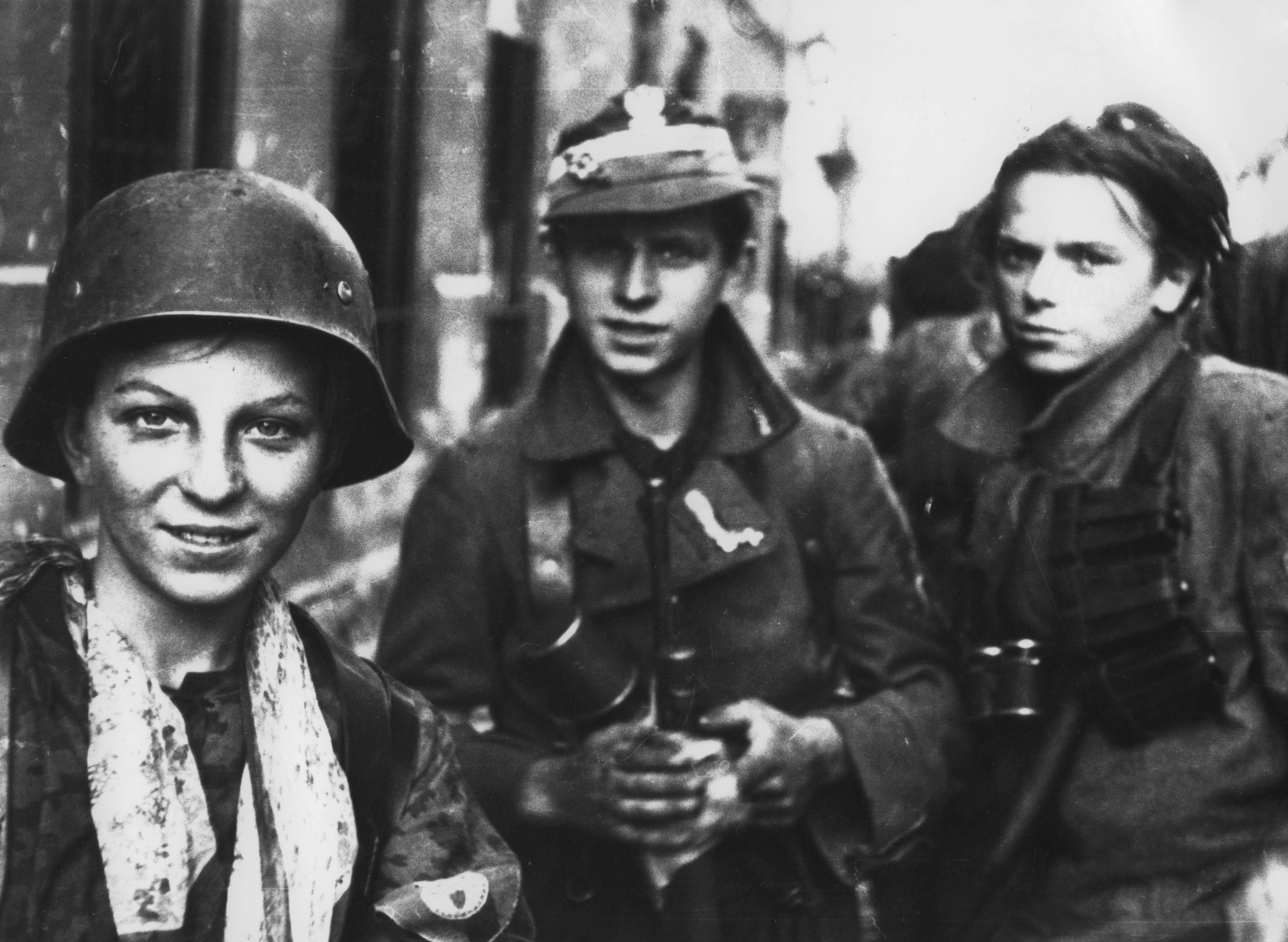
Polish Boy Scouts played an important role in the Warsaw Uprising.

20: The Red Army relaunches its offensive into Romania.
: 168 Allied airmen arrive at Buchenwald concentration camp.

21: The Dumbarton Oaks Conference begins, setting up the basic structure of the United Nations.

22: The Japanese are now in total retreat from India.
: German Chancellor Adolf Hitler issued the first of several orders to the German commander of Paris, General Dietrich von Choltitz, to destroy the city.

23: Romania breaks with the Axis, surrenders to the Soviet Union, and joins the Allies.

25: Paris is liberated; De Gaulle makes a triumphant speech at the Hotel de la Ville, which is also broadcast nationwide. The German military under Lt. Gen. von Choltitz disobeys Hitler's orders to burn the city and destroy all bridges over the Seine. Meanwhile, the southern Allied forces move up from the Riviera, take Grenoble and Avignon.

26: De Gaulle and the Free French parade triumphantly down the Champs-Élysées under some sniper fire.

28: The Germans surrender at Toulon and Marseille in southern France.
: Patton's tanks cross the Marne.

29: The anti-German Slovak National Uprising starts in Slovakia.

30: The Allies enter Rouen, in northwestern France.

31: American forces turn over the government of France to Free French troops.
: The Soviet army enters Bucharest.

== September ==
September 1944

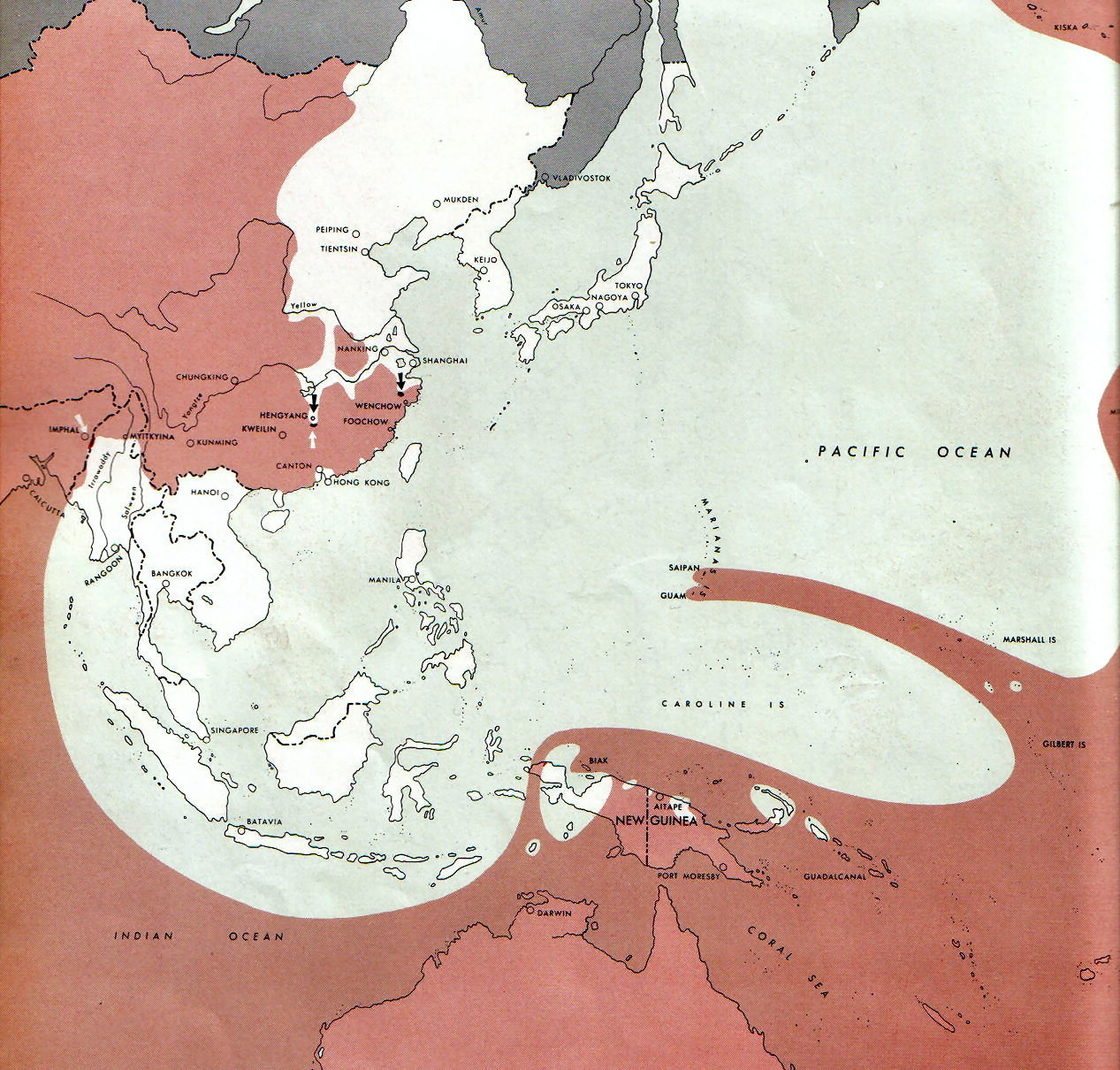
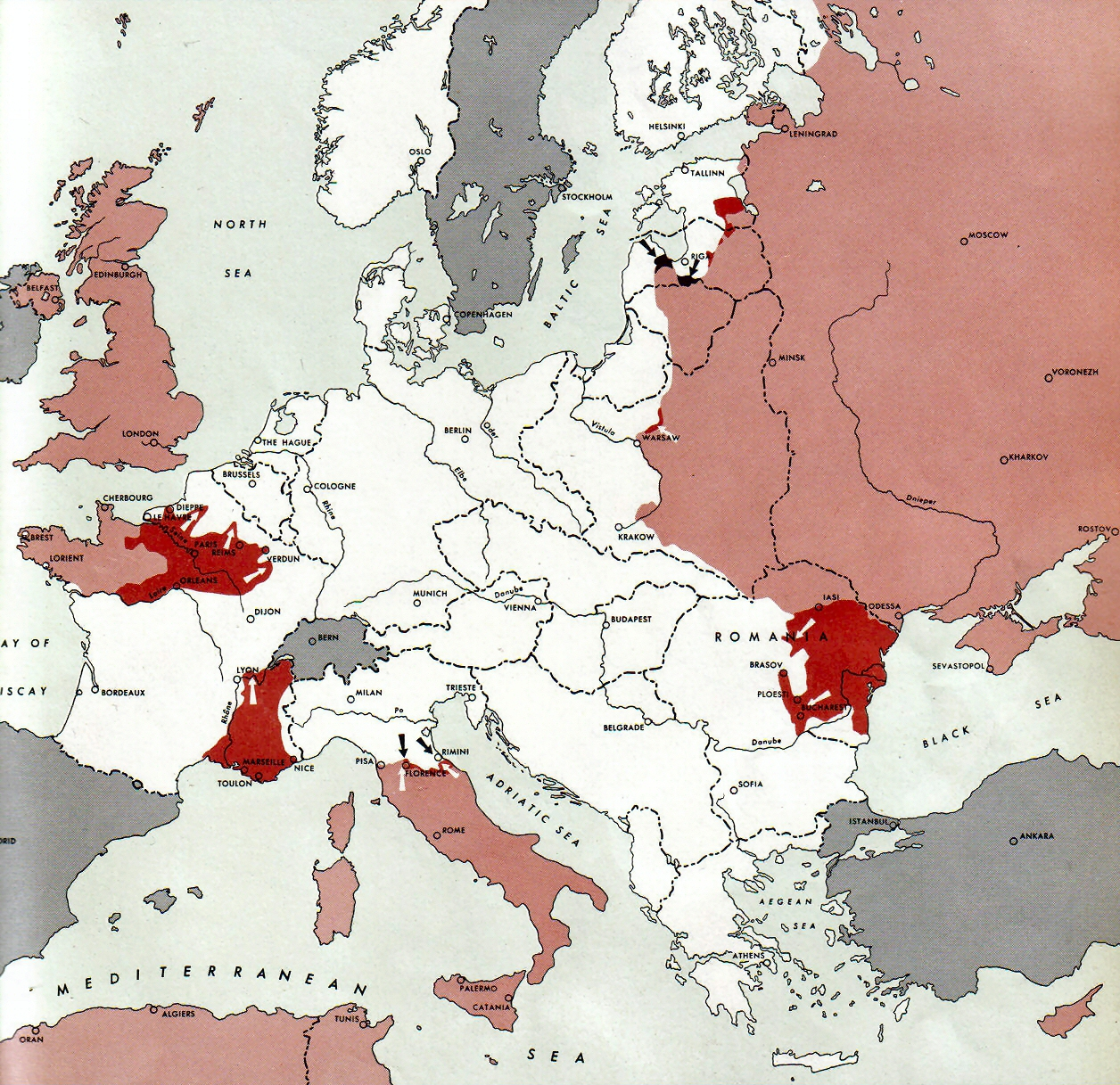
1st

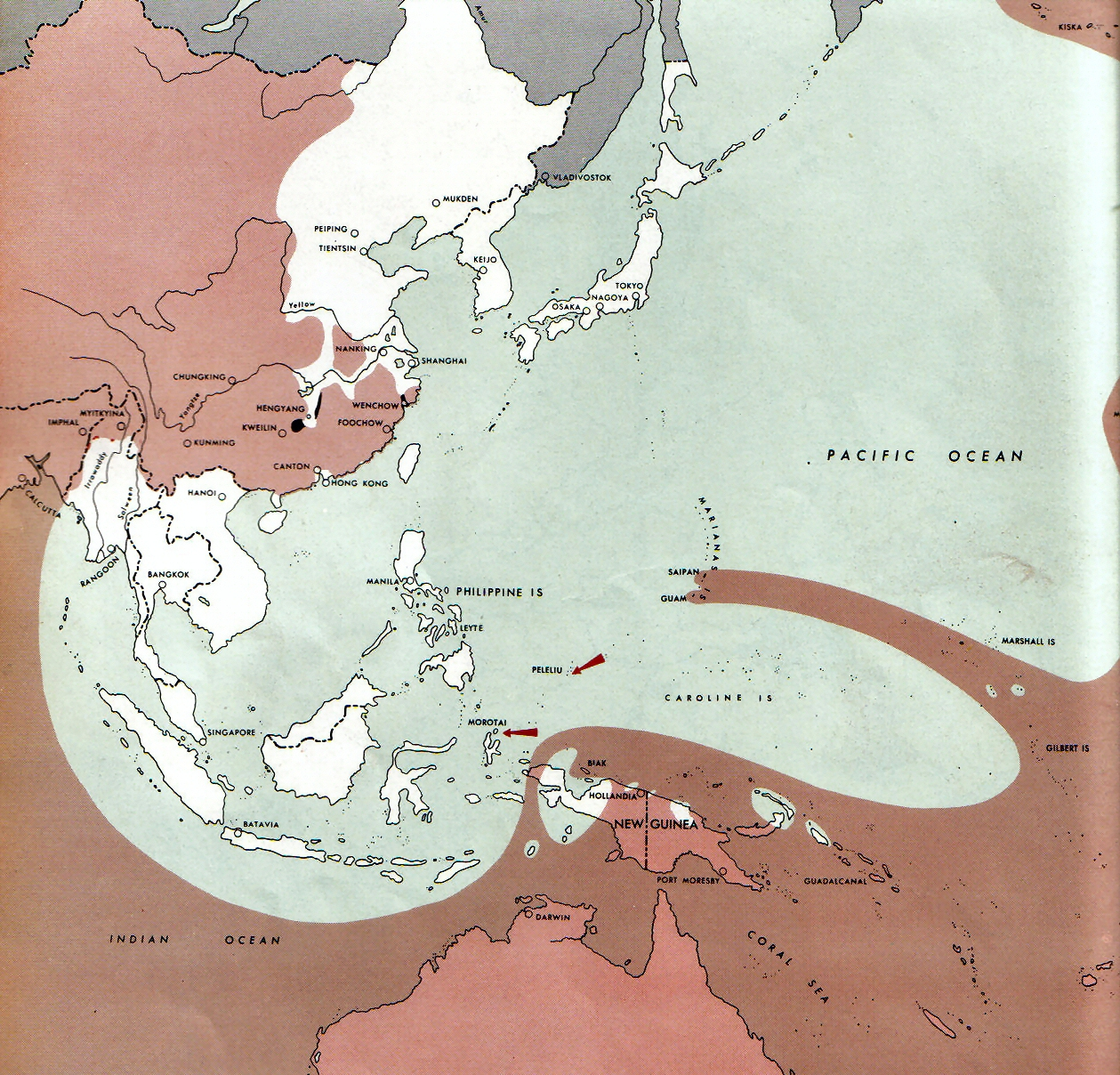
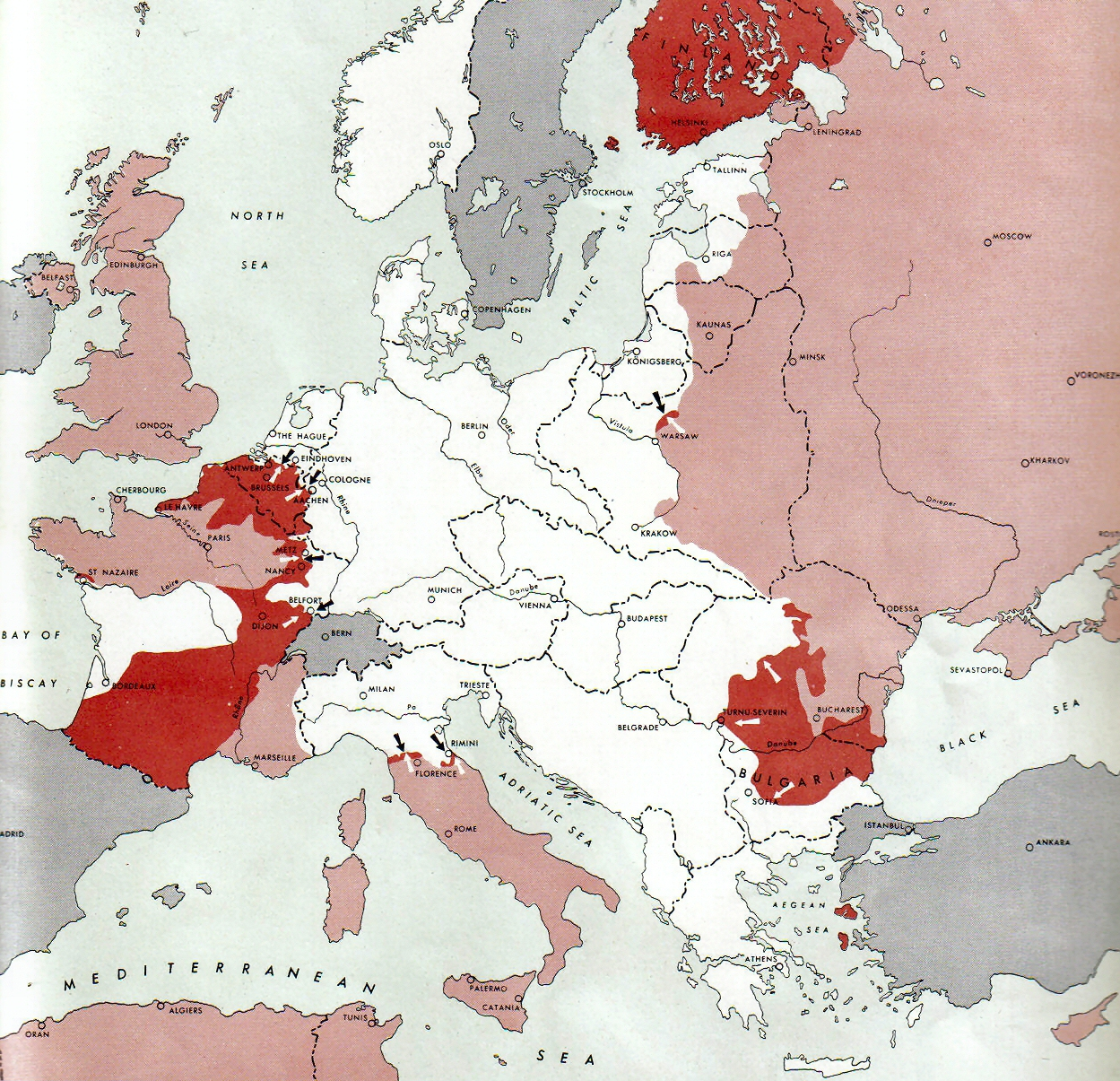
15th

1: Canadian troops capture Dieppe, France.

2: Allied troops enter Belgium.

3: Brussels is liberated by the British Second Army.
: Lyon is liberated by French and American troops.

4: A cease fire takes effect between Finland and the USSR.
: Operation Outward ends.

5: Antwerp is liberated by British 11th Armoured Division and local resistance.
: The uprising in Warsaw continues.
: United States III Corps arrives in European Theater.
: The Belgian, Dutch and Luxembourgish governments in exile sign the London Customs Convention, laying the foundations for the Benelux economic union.

6: The "blackout" is diminished to a "dim-out" as threat of invasion and further bombing seems an unlikely possibility.
: Ghent and Liège are liberated by British troops.

8: Ostend is liberated by Canadian troops.
: Soviet troops enter Bulgaria.
: The Belgian government in exile returns to Belgium from London where it has spent the war.
: The first successful operational use of the German V-2 rocket took place: two were launched at London, and one at Paris. A woman was killed by one that fell on the Chiswick area of London.

9: Charles de Gaulle forms the Provisional Government of the French Republic in France.
: The Fatherland Front of Bulgaria overthrows the national government and declares war on Germany.

10: Luxembourg is liberated by U.S. First Army.
: Two Allied forces meet at Dijon, cutting France in half.
: First Allied troops enter Germany, entering Aachen, a city on the border.
: Dutch railway workers go on strike. The German response results in the Dutch famine of 1944.

11: United States XXI Corps arrives in European Theater.
: the Air battle over the Ore Mountains (after German attacks on the US bomber formation, accompanying US Mustangs engage the German fighters)

12: The Second Quebec Conference (codenamed "Octagon") begins: Roosevelt and Churchill discuss military cooperation in the Pacific and the future of Germany.

13: American troops reach the Siegfried Line, the west wall of Germany's defence system.

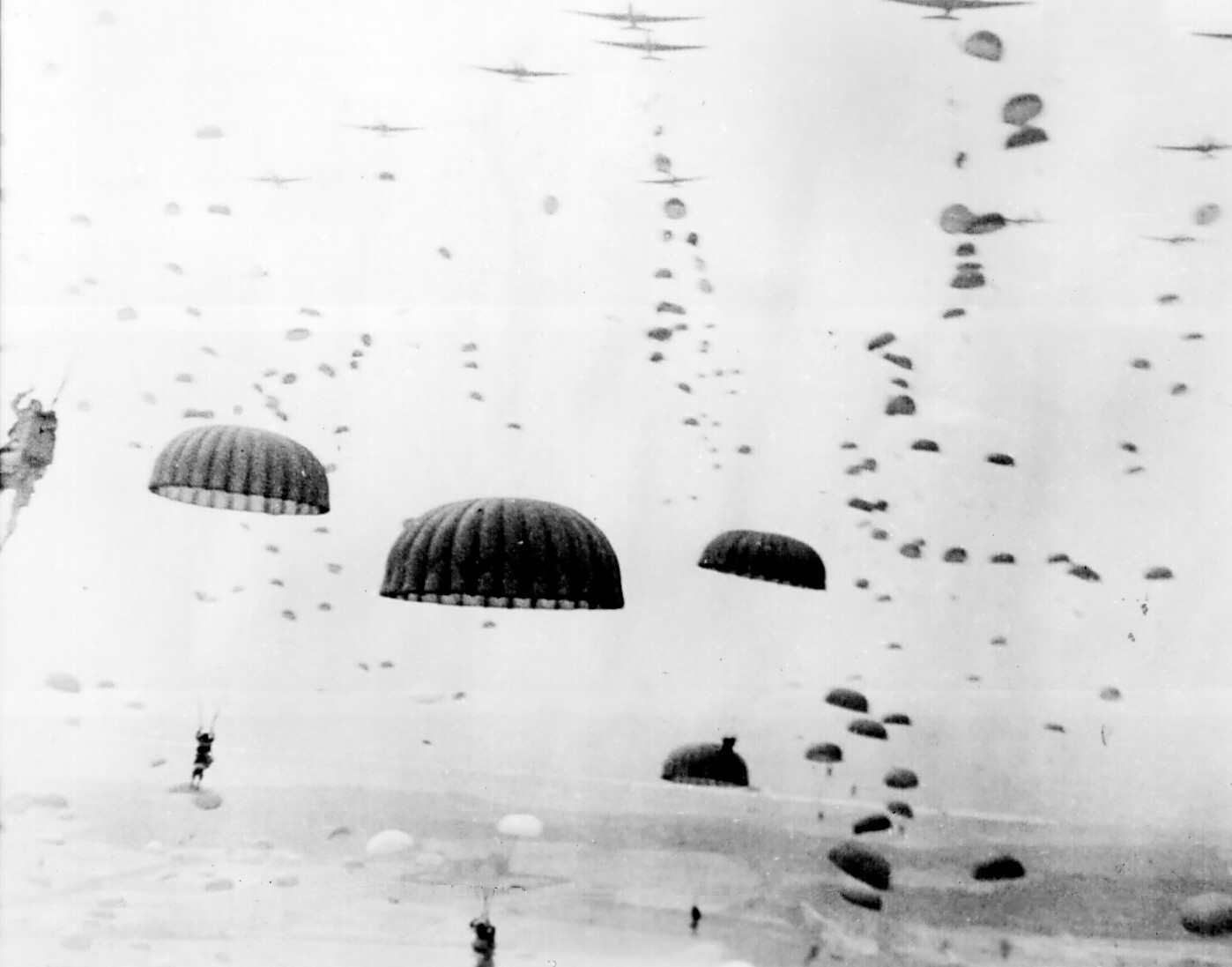
Waves of paratroops land in the Netherlands during Operation Market Garden in September 1944.

14: Soviet Baltic Offensive commences.

15: American Marines land on Peleliu in the Palau Islands; a bloody battle of attrition continues for two and a half months.
: German troops begin their withdrawal from Lapland.

16: The Red Army enters Sofia, Bulgaria.

17: Operation Market Garden, the attempted liberation of Arnhem and turning of the German flank begins.
: British and commonwealth forces enter neutral San Marino and engage German forces in a small-scale conflict which ends 20 September.

18: Brest, France, an important Channel port, falls to the Allies.
: Jüri Uluots proclaims the Government of Estonia headed by Deputy Prime Minister Otto Tief.

19: The Moscow Armistice is signed between the Soviet Union and Finland.
: Nancy liberated by U.S. First Army.

20: The Government of Estonia seizes the government buildings of Toompea from the German forces and appeals to the Soviet Union for the independence of Estonia. The Soviet advance sparks a major Estonian civil evacuation abroad, with ca. 80,000 people (7% of the pre-war population), including almost the entire Coastal Swedish minority, fleeing mostly over the Baltic Sea to Sweden.
: United States XVI Corps arrives in European Theater.

21: British forces take Rimini, Italy.
: The Second Dumbarton Oaks Conference begins: it will set guidelines for the United Nations.
: In Belgium, Charles of Flanders is sworn in as Prince-Regent while a decision is delayed about whether King Leopold III can ever return to his functions after being accused of collaboration.
: San Marino declares war on the Axis.
: The Government of Estonia prints a few hundred copies of the Riigi Teataja (State Gazette) and is forced to flee under Soviet pressure.

22: The Red Army takes Tallinn, the first Baltic harbour outside the minefields of the Gulf of Finland.
: The Germans surrender at Boulogne.

23: Americans take Ulithi atoll in the Caroline Islands; it is a massive atoll that will later become an important naval base.

24: The Red Army is well into Poland at this time.
The Estonian government of Otto Tief fails to evacuate from Western Estonia and disbands, with most members of the government eventually captured by the Soviets.

25: British troops pull out of Arnhem with the failure of Operation Market Garden. Over 6,000 paratroopers are captured; of the British 1st Airborne Division, just under 8,000 of the 10,005 paratroopers are declared casualties, a staggering 80% loss.
: United States IX Corps arrives in Pacific Theater.

26: In Caserta, Italy the Greek government in exile concluded an agreement with various guerrilla leaders who acknowledged its authority. There are signs of civil war in Greece as the Communist-controlled National Liberation Front and the British-backed government seem irreconcilable.

28: Brig. Gen. Theodore Roosevelt Jr., dead of a heart attack on 12 July 1944, is posthumously awarded the Medal of Honor for his leadership and actions on D-Day at Utah Beach.
:The Soviets capture entire mainland Estonia.

29: Soviet forces begin the Moonsund Landing Operation to capture the West Estonian archipelago from German forces.

30: The German garrison in Calais surrenders to Canadian troops. At one time, Hitler thought it would be the focus of the cross-Channel invasion.

== October ==
October 1944

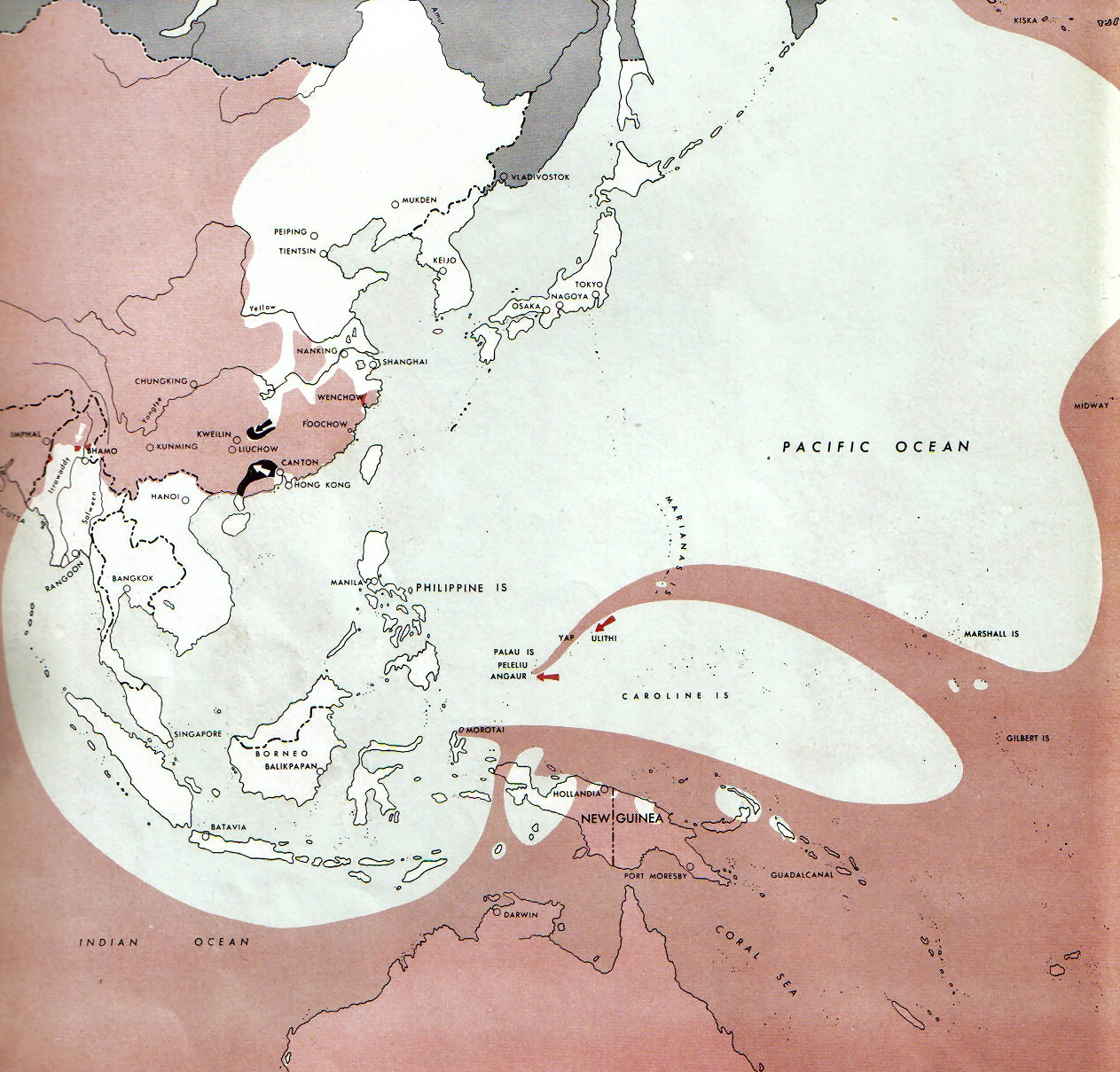
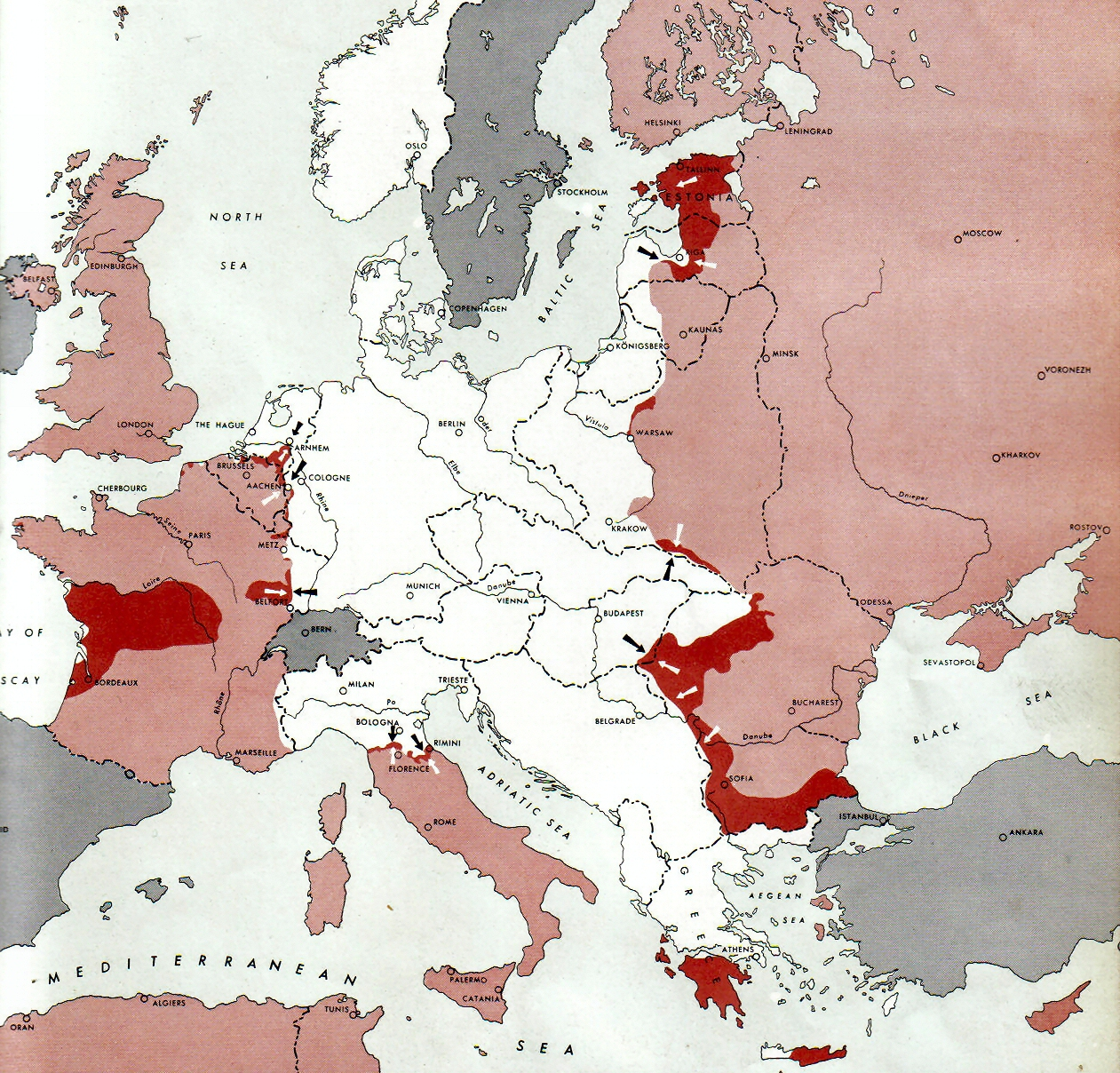
1st

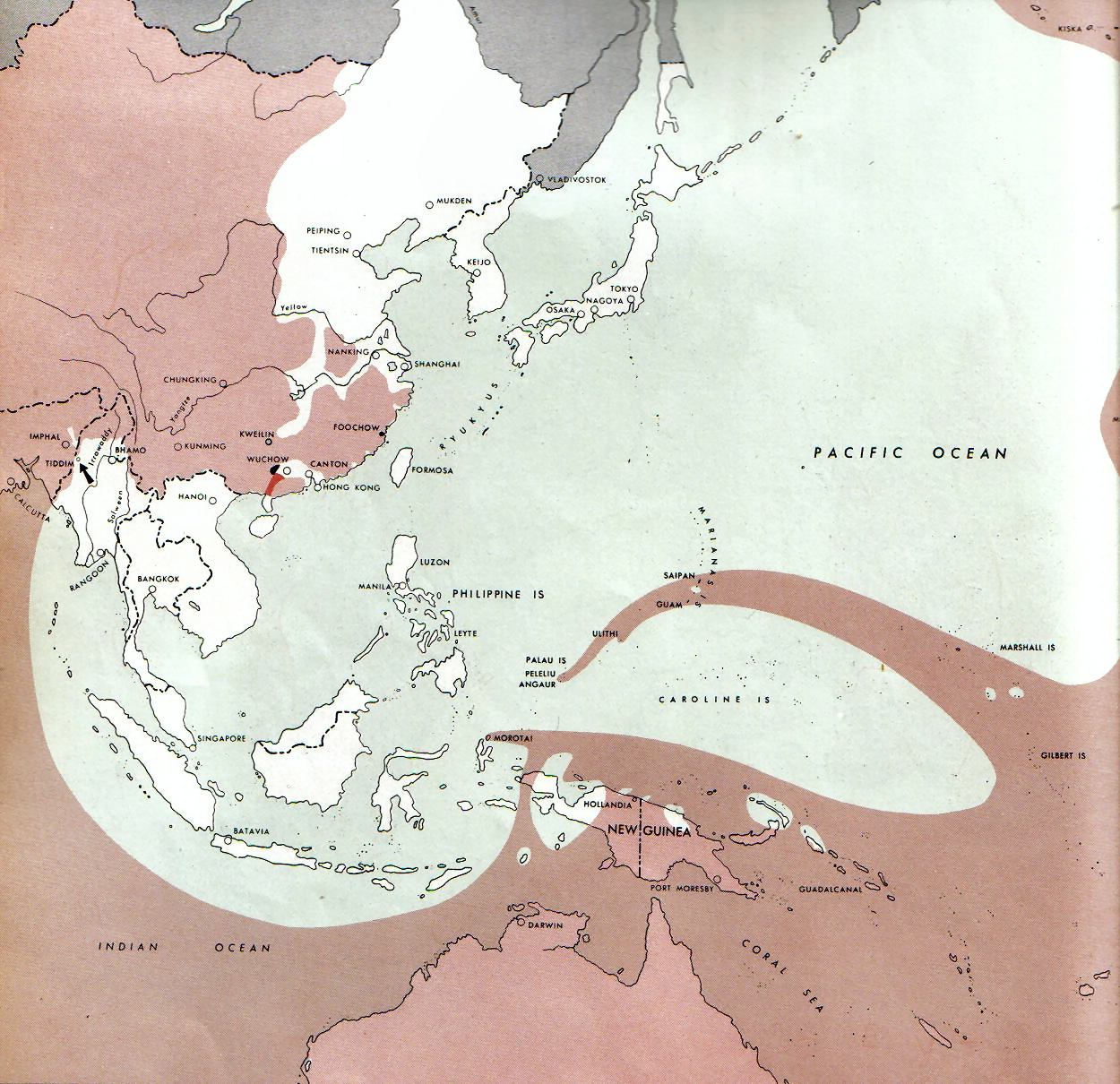
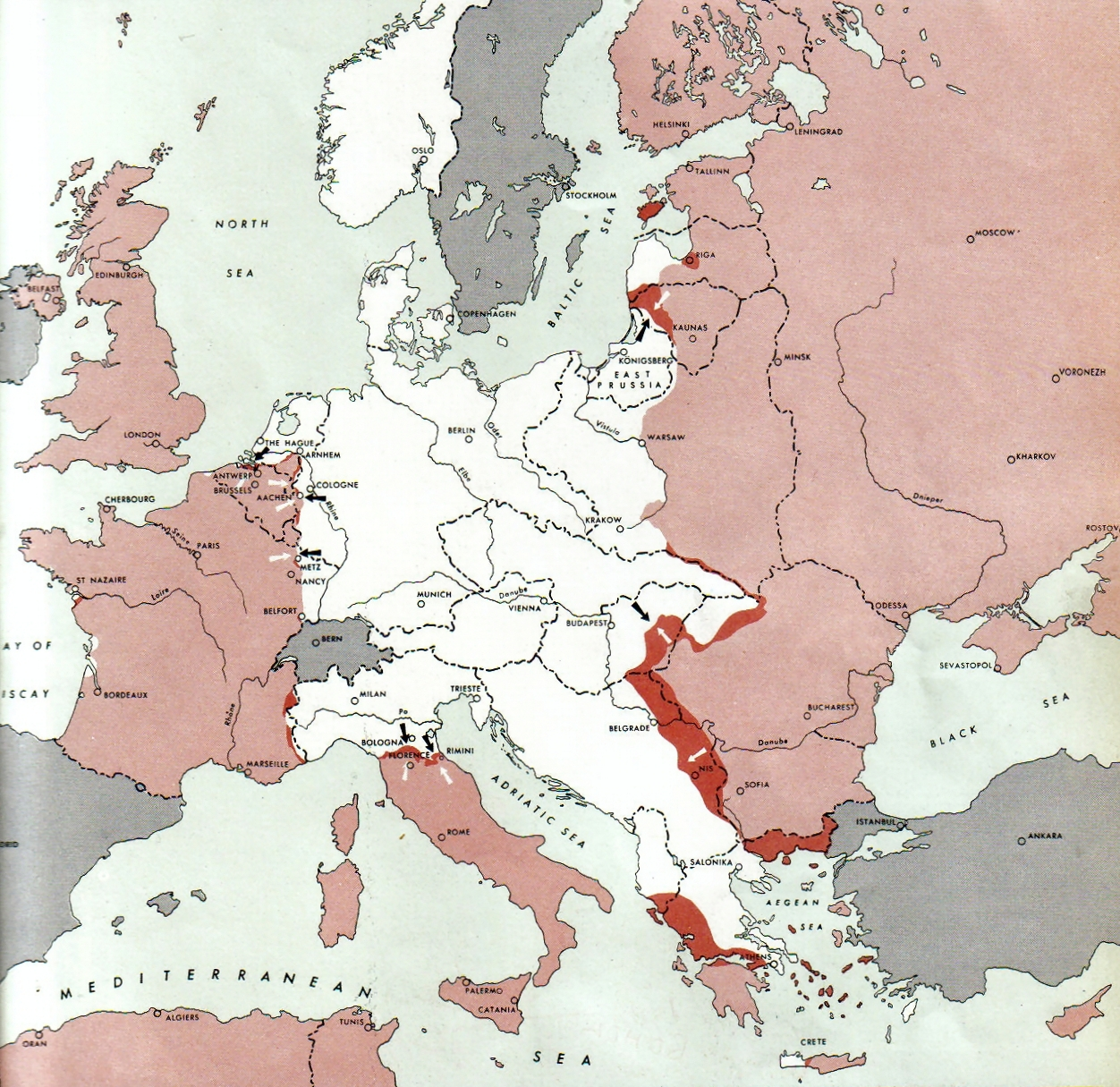
15th

1: A Hungarian delegation arrives in Moscow to negotiate an armistice with the USSR.
: Soviet troops enter Yugoslavia.

2: Germans finally succeed in putting down the Warsaw Uprising by the Polish Home Army.
: American troops are now in a full-scale attack on the German "West Wall".
: Allied forces land on Crete.

3: Soviet forces capture Hiiumaa island in Estonia.

5: Canadian troops cross the border into the Netherlands.
: The Red Army enters Hungary and also launch an offensive to capture Riga, Latvia.

6: Soviet and Czechoslovak troops enter northeastern Slovakia.
: The Battle of Debrecen begins as German and Soviet forces advance against each other in eastern Hungary.

7: A riot took place at Auschwitz concentration camp when the Sonderkommando, Jewish prisoners forced to aid with the disposal of victims of the Holocaust, came to understand that they also were slated for extermination. Over 450 were killed in suppressing the revolt, along with many others who escaped the camp in the melee.

9: The Moscow Conference (1944) begins: Churchill and Stalin discuss spheres of influence in the postwar Balkans.

10: The Red Army reach the Niemen River in Prussia and continue the battle around Riga.
: The Allied combined forces take Corinth, Greece.

12: Athens is liberated by the EAM.
: US Navy carriers attack Formosa (Taiwan).
: United States XXIII Corps Arrives in the European Theater.

14: British troops enter Athens.
: Field Marshal Rommel, under suspicion as one of the "bomb plotters" voluntarily commits suicide to save his family. He is later buried with full military honors.

15: Hungarian regent Miklós Horthy is overthrown by the Germans, who replace him with Ferenc Szálasi.
: Allied bombardment of Aachen continues, the first major battle on German soil.

16: Red Army forces are attacking German forces in East Prussia.

18: Hitler orders a call-up of all remaining men from 16 to 60 for Home Guard duties in the Volkssturm Militia.

20: The Battle of Leyte: U.S. forces land on Leyte, Philippines. MacArthur lands and states: "I have returned".
:The Red Army and Yugoslav partisans under the command of Josip Broz Tito liberate Belgrade.

21: Aachen is occupied by U.S. First Army; it is the first major German city to be captured.

23-26: The Battle of Leyte Gulf: The United States Third Fleet and the United States Seventh Fleet win a decisive naval battle over the Imperial Japanese Navy in the Philippine Islands.

23: The Allies recognise General de Gaulle as the head of a provisional government of France.
: B-29s are now using Tinian Island, in the Marianas, as a base for the systematic bombing of Japan.
: Soviet forces in cooperation with Tito's Partizan forces, liberated Novi Sad in Yugoslavia.

25: Three distinct air engagements in the Battle of Leyte Gulf take place as U.S. Navy carrier-based planes destroy many Japanese ships in the waters off the Philippines.
:Romania is fully liberated by Red Army and Romanian troops.

27: The Battle of Hürtgen Forest is developing. It will continue through October and November and have its last attacks in December.

== November ==
November 1944

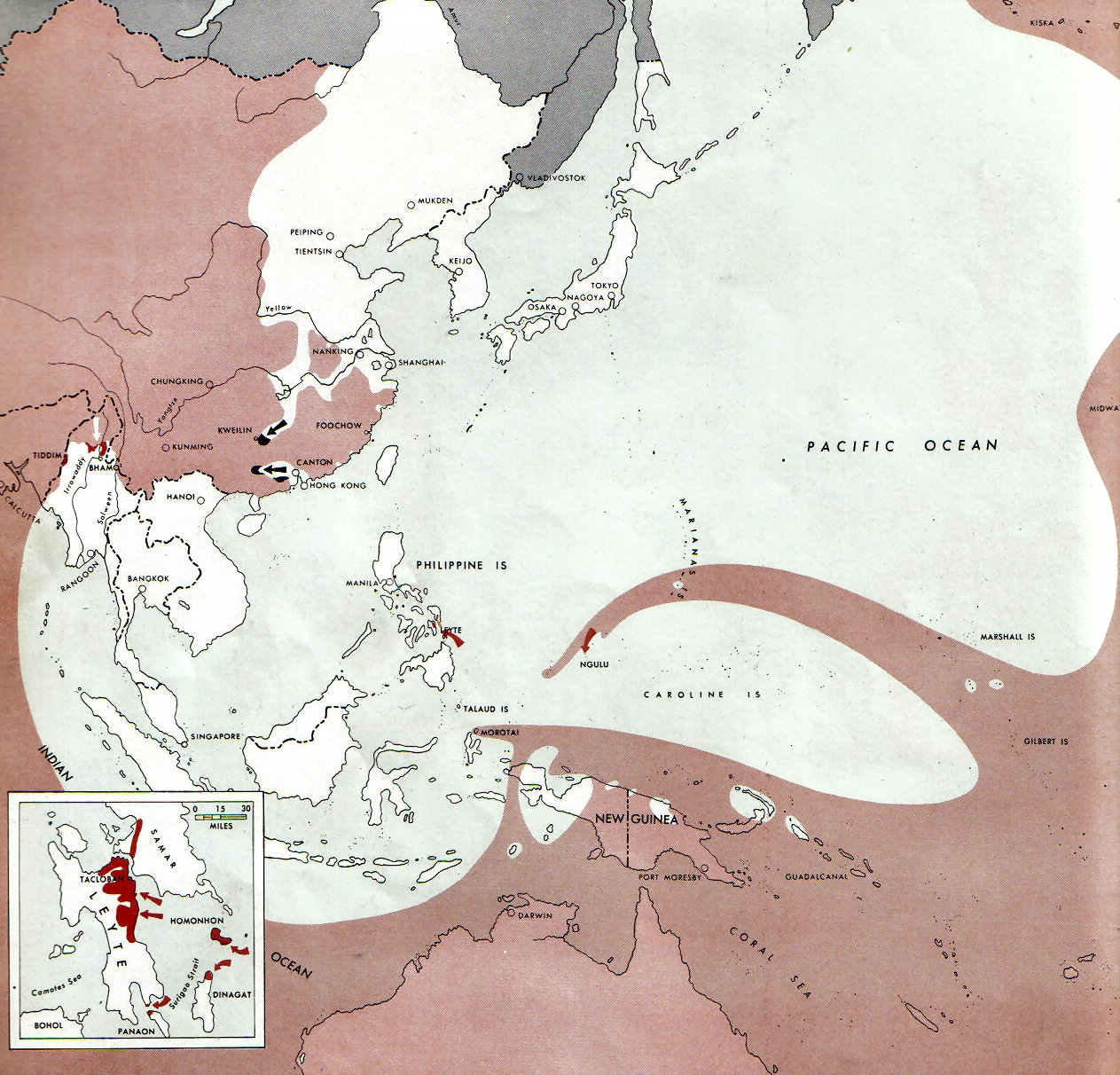
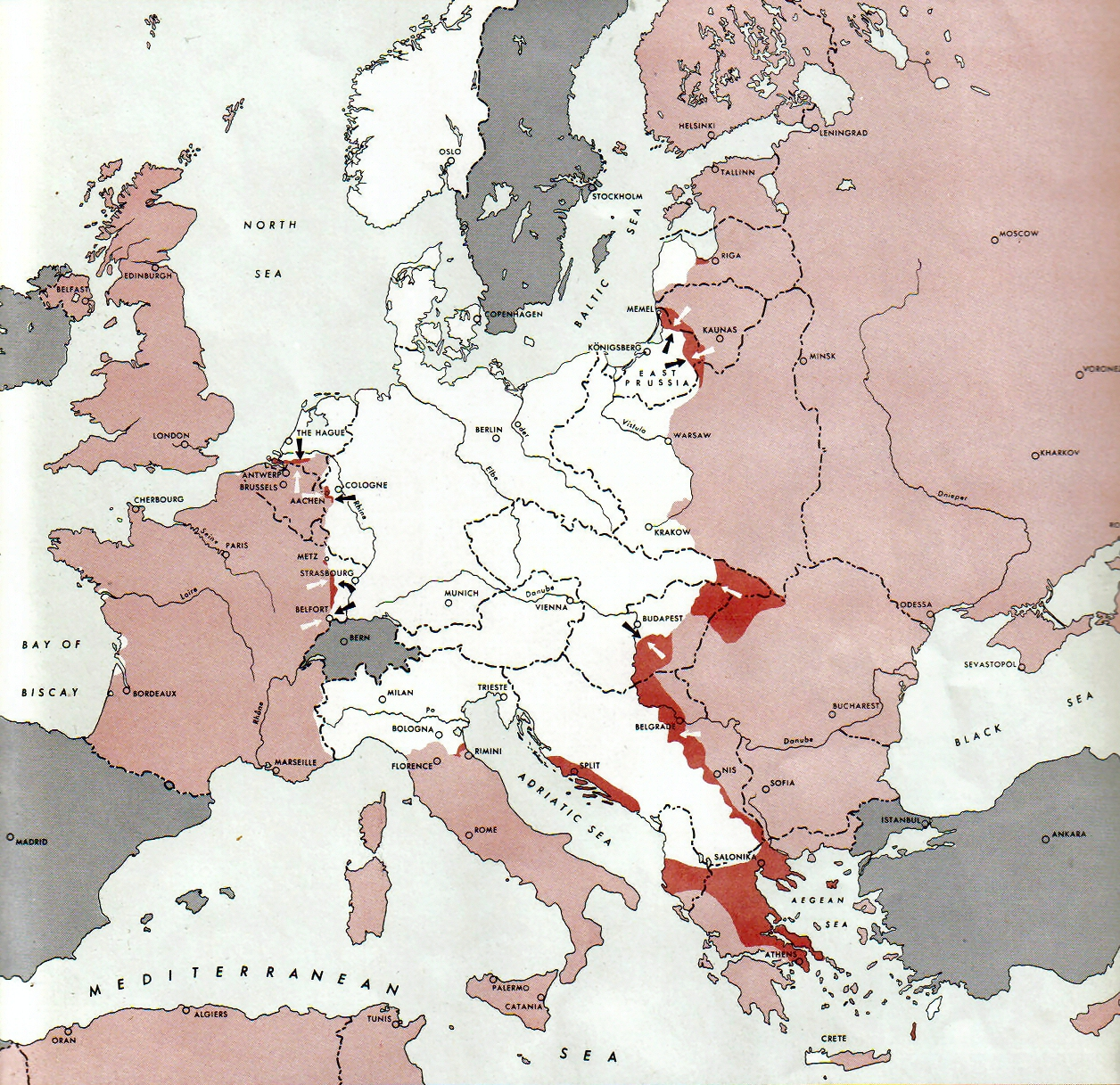
1st

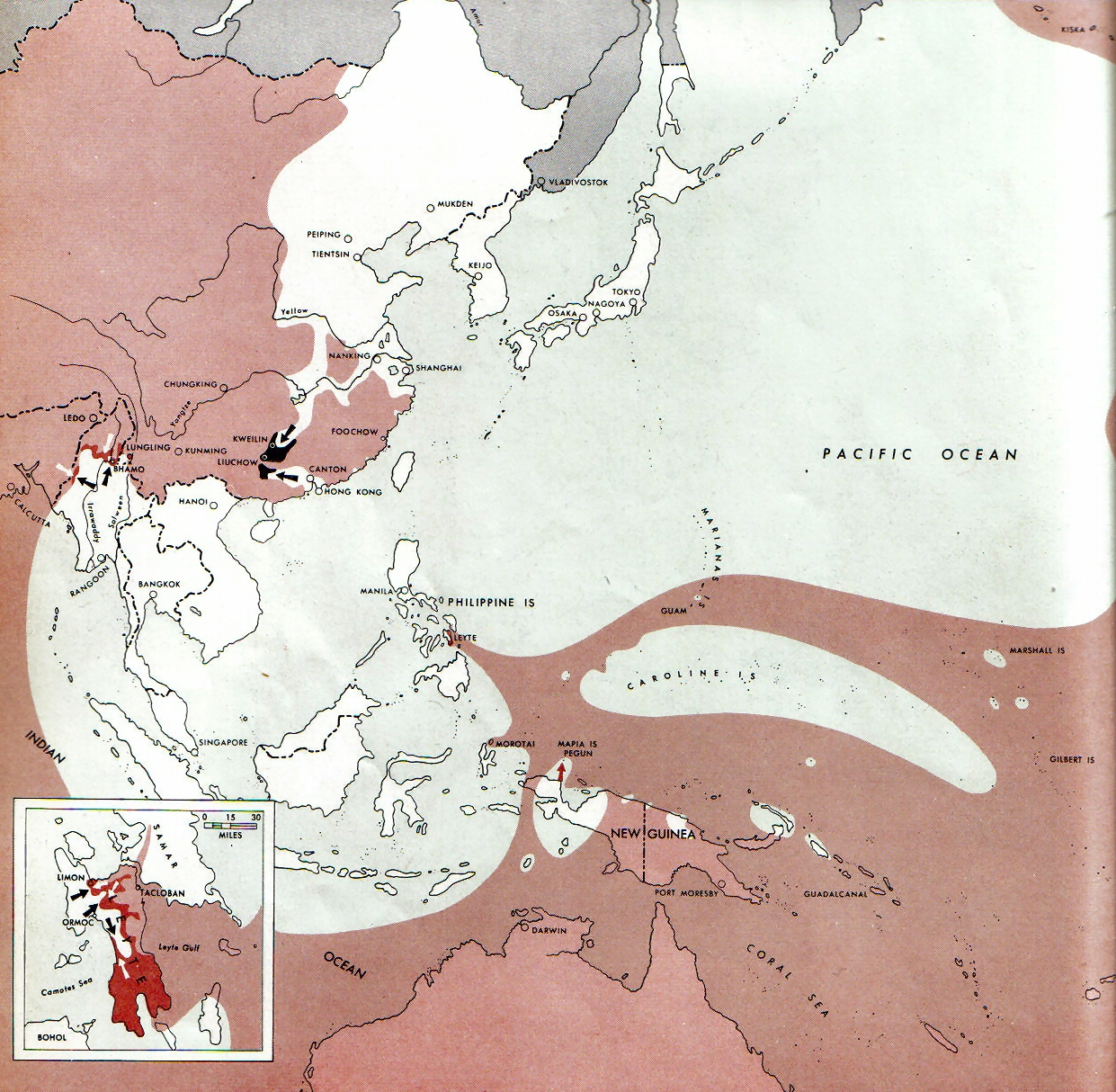
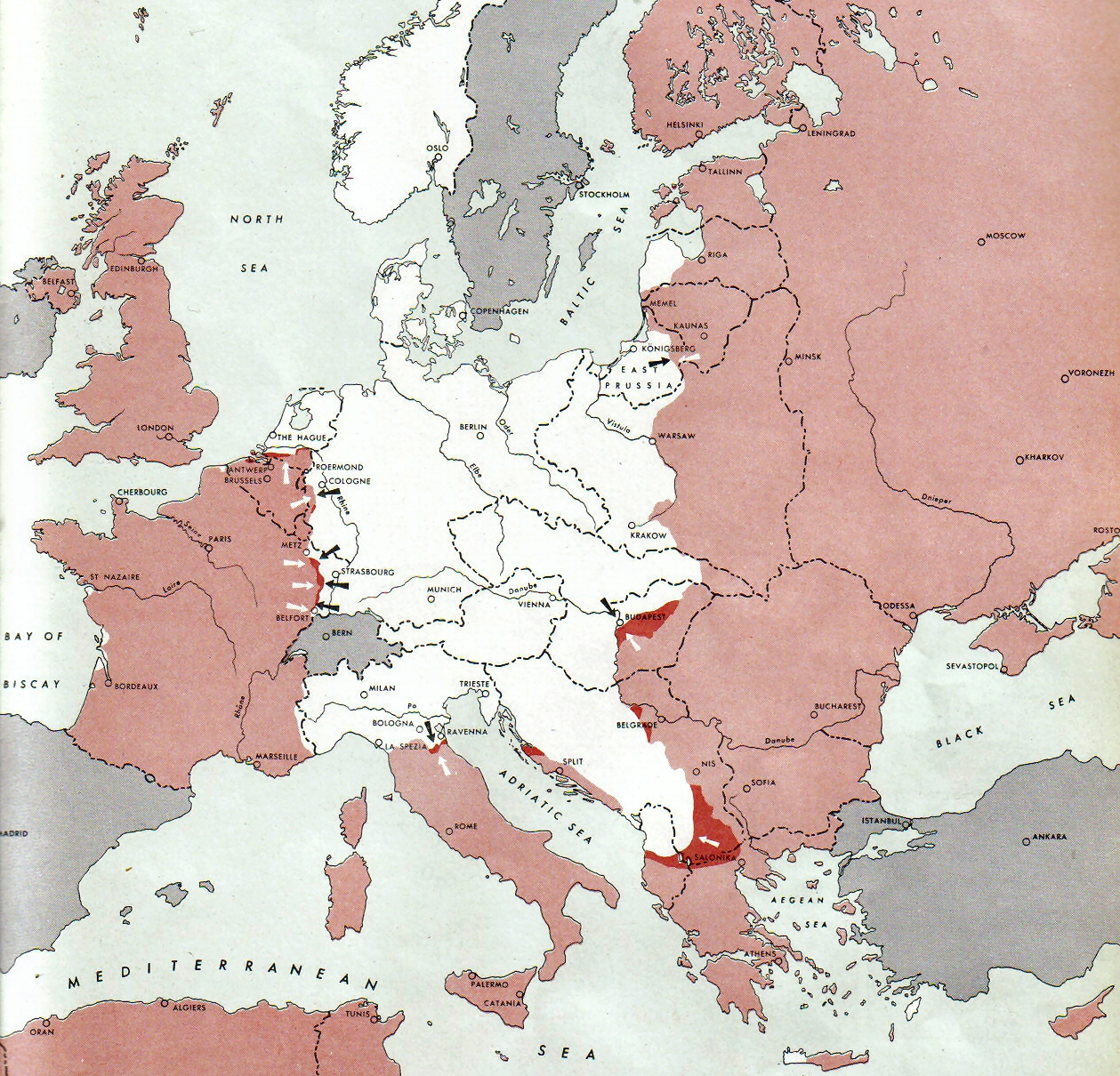
15th

1: British forces occupy Salonika, Greece, and distribute food in Athens, which is experiencing famine.
: "Operation Infatuate", an Allied attempt to free the approaches to Antwerp begins; amphibious landings take place on Walcheren Island.

2: Canadian troops take Zeebrugge in Belgium; Belgium is now entirely liberated.

4: Remaining Axis forces withdraw from the Greek mainland. German occupation forces will remain in several Greek islands until capitulation.

British Gen. John Dill dies in Washington, D.C., and is buried in Arlington National Cemetery, the only foreigner to be so honored at the time.

5: US planes bomb Singapore, the first of 11 such raids between November 1944 and March 1945.
: The aircraft carrier USS Lexington is heavily damaged by kamikaze attacks.

7: Election Day in the U.S.: Roosevelt wins an unprecedented, unrepeated fourth term as U.S. president.

9: General Patton's troops and tanks cross the Moselle River and threaten Metz.

10: V-2 rockets continue to hit Britain, at the rate of about eight a day.

12: After numerous bombings while anchored in a fjord at Tromsø, Norway, the German battleship Tirpitz is sunk.

17: The Germans give up Tirana, Albania which is liberated by local partisans.

20: Hitler leaves his wartime headquarters at Rastenberg, East Prussia, never to return; he goes to Berlin, where he will soon establish himself at the Führerbunker.

23: Metz, France is taken, and Strasbourg, in eastern France, is liberated by French troops.

24: The first B-29 originating from Tinian Naval Base, in the Marianas, raids Tokyo.

25: Japanese take Nanning in south China, as the war in that theatre continues.
: The USS Intrepid is hit by kamikazes for the third time; other American ships are heavily damaged.
: Soviet forces capture Saaremaa island, the last major German outpost in Estonia, culminating the Moonsund Landing Operation.

26: The war in Italy is at a stalemate, partly because of heavy rains.

Heinrich Himmler orders the crematoriums and gas chambers of Auschwitz II-Birkenau dismantled and blown up.

28: Antwerp is now a major supply port for the onward moving Allies.

30: Kunming, China, site of Chengkung Airfield and Kunming Airport, is threatened by Japanese attacks.
: United States XXII Corps arrives in European Theater.
: The Thiaroye Massacre begins in French West Africa.

== December ==
December 1944

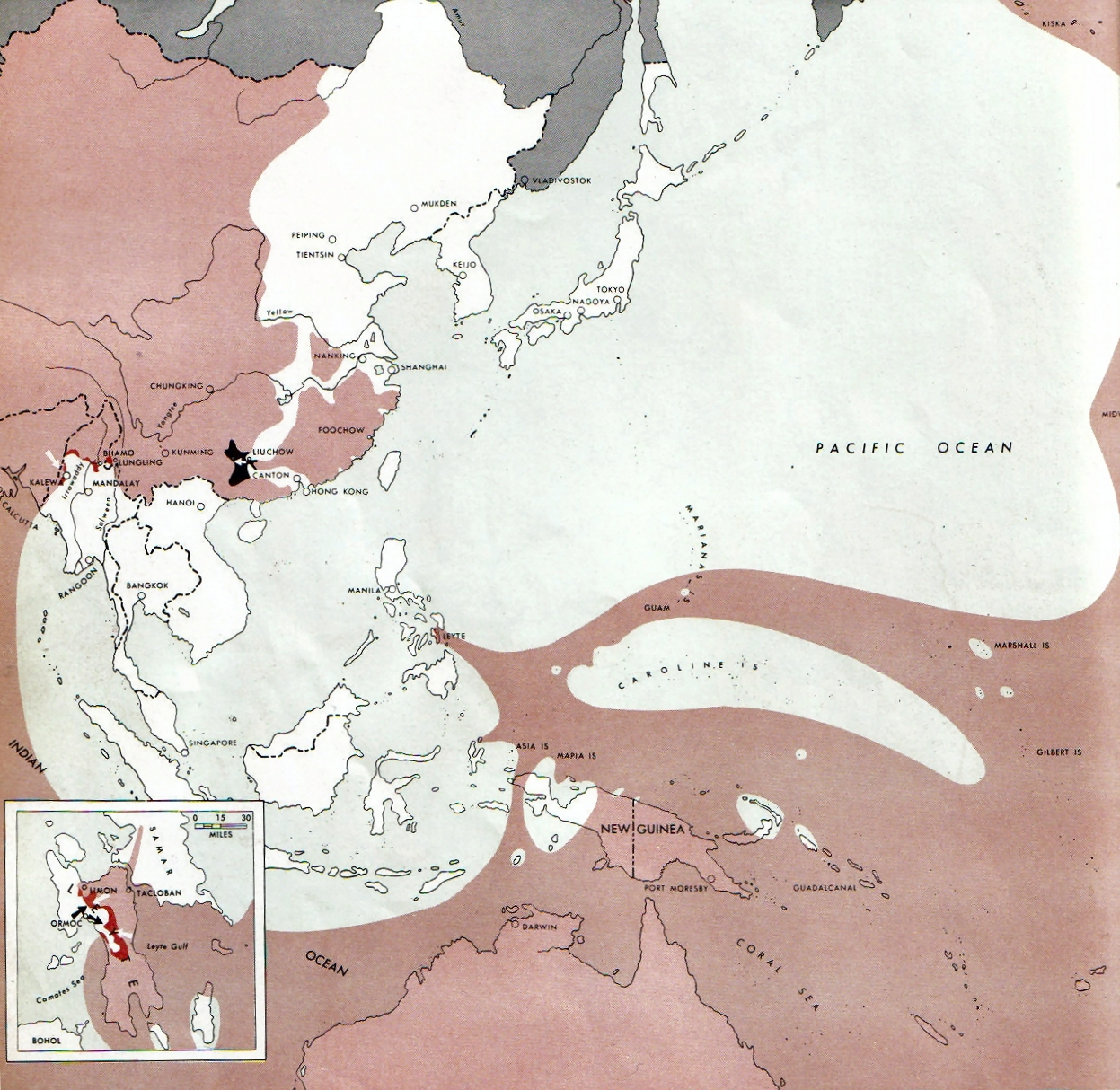
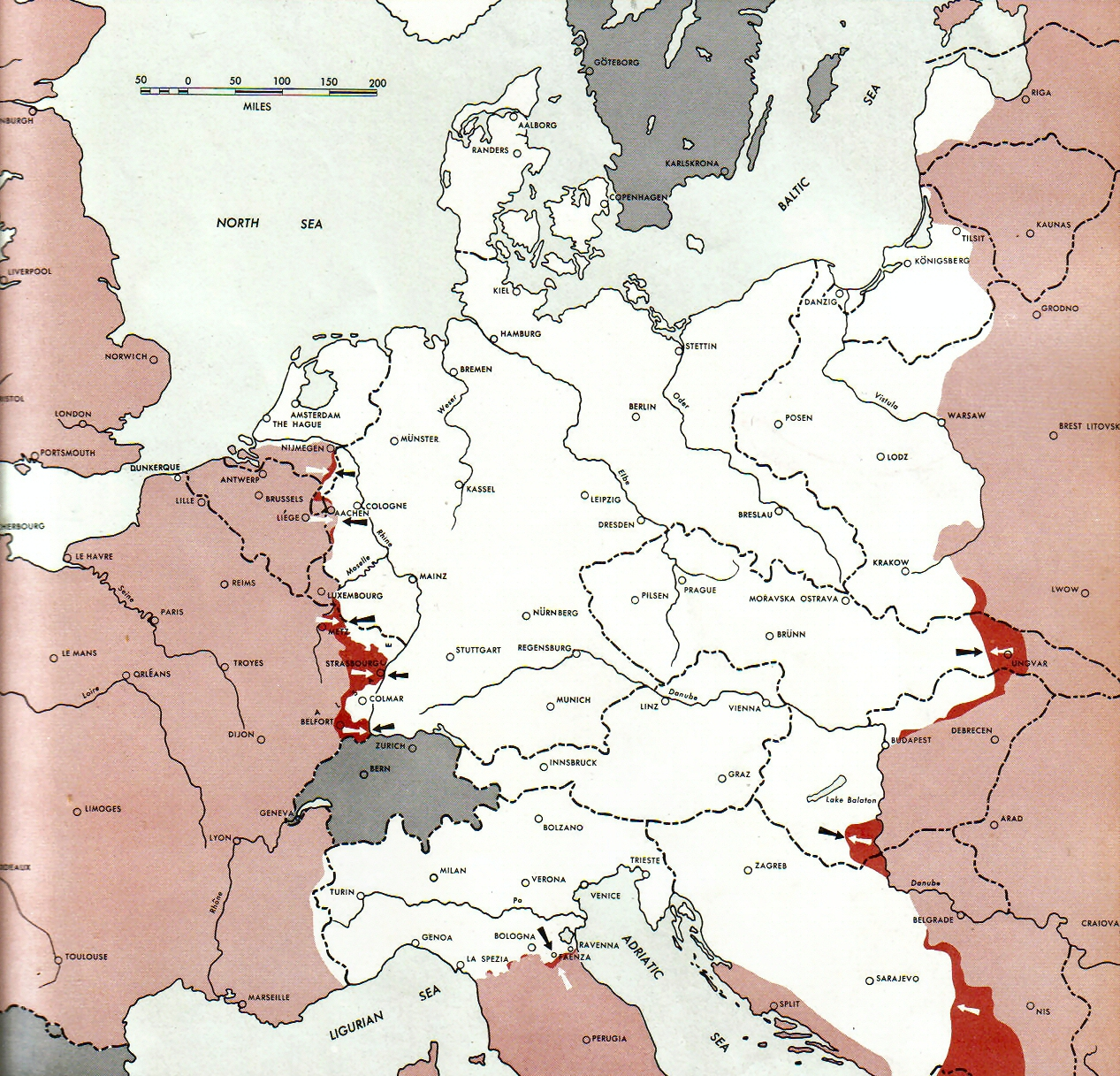
1st

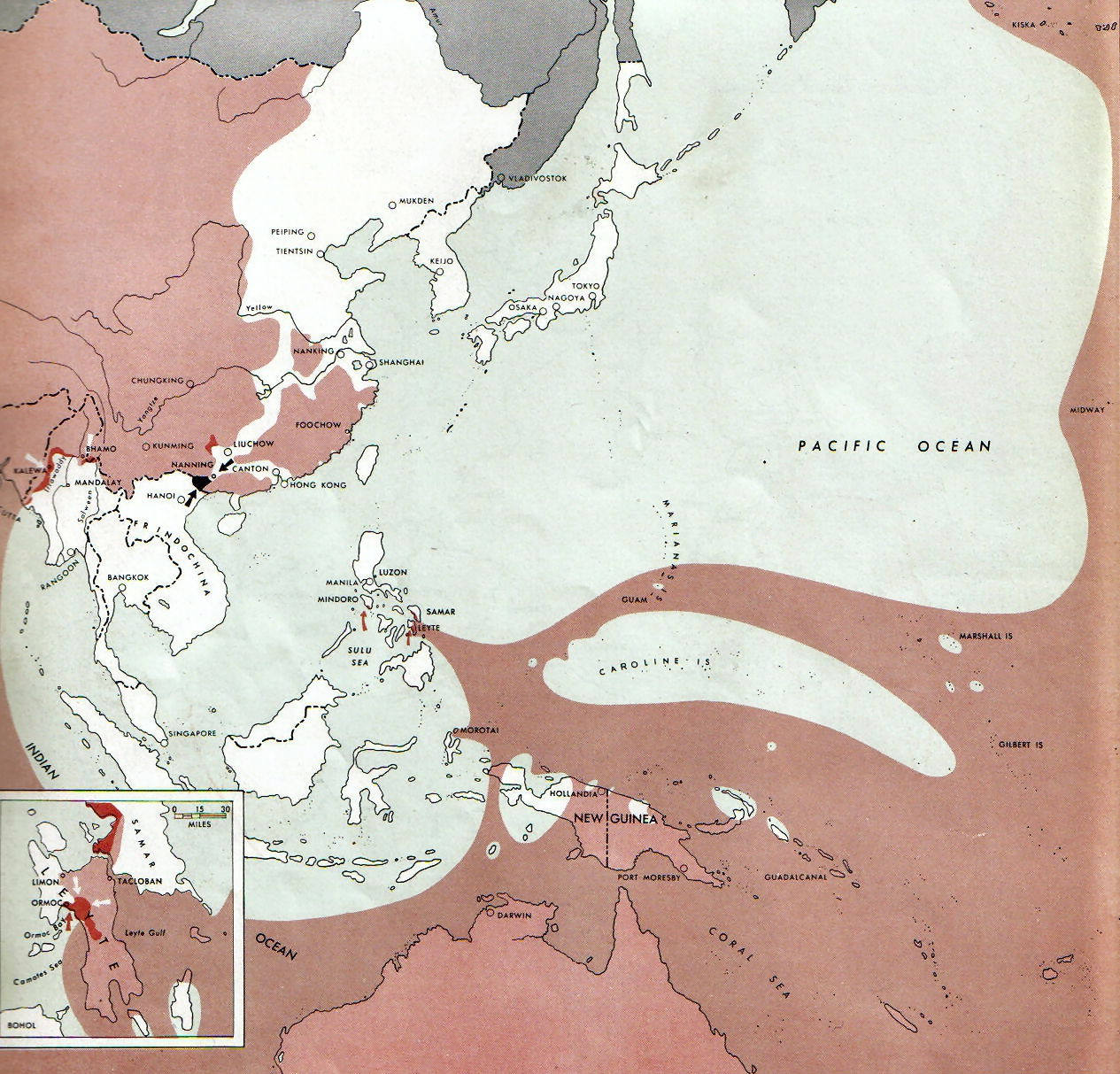
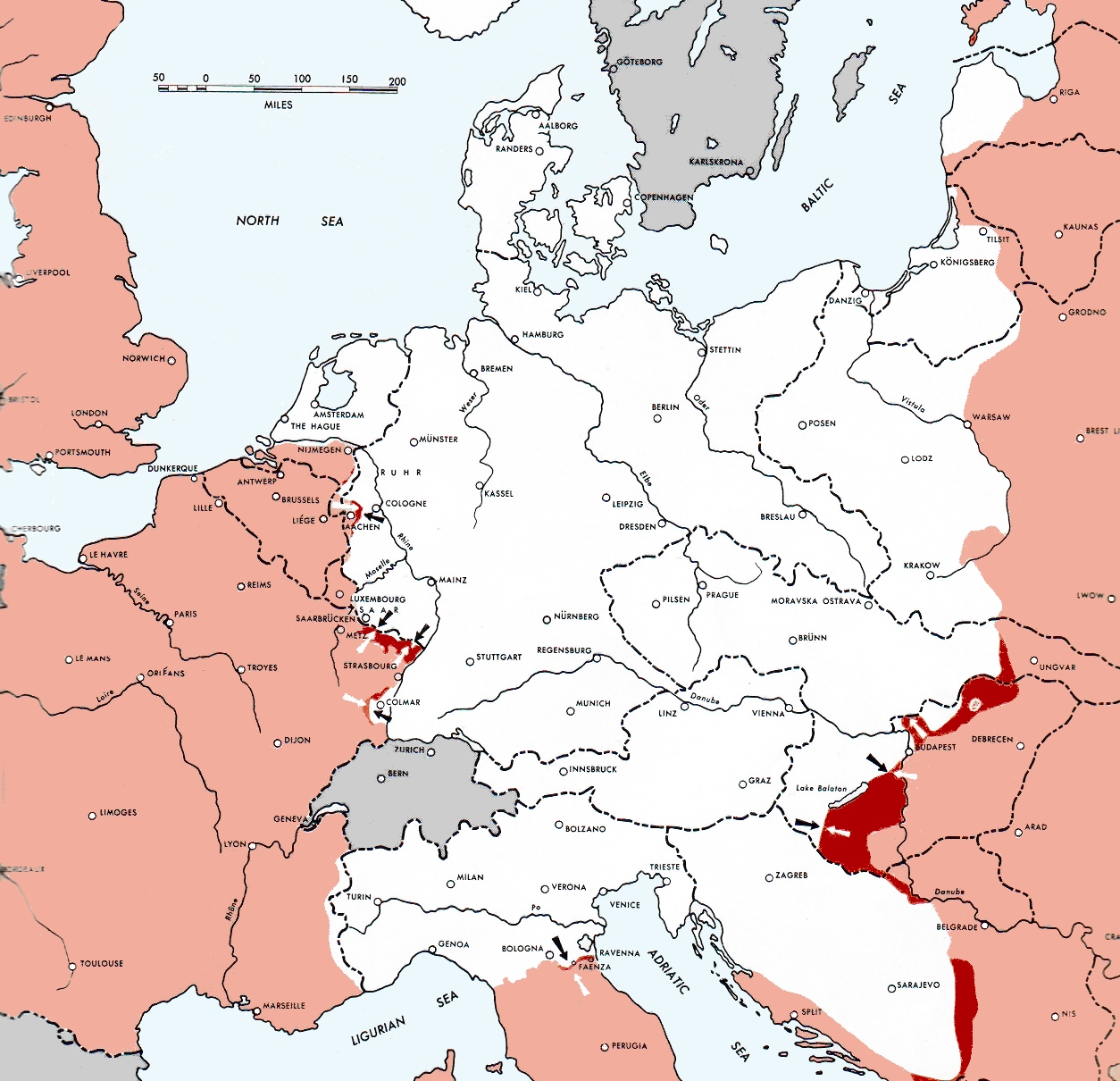
15th

3:The British army and the police shoot unarmed protestors in Athens; the crowd carried Greek, American, British and Soviet flags, and chanted: "Viva Churchill, Viva Roosevelt, Viva Stalin’"

3: The Dekemvriana ("December events") begin in the Greek capital, Athens, between members of the leftist National Liberation Front and government forces, backed by the British. The clashes are limited to Athens, however, and the rest of the country remains relatively tranquil.
: The British Home Guard is stood down.

5: The Allies are now in control of Ravenna, Italy.

8: The softening-up bombardment of Iwo Jima begins.

14: Japanese defenders in Palawan in the Philippines kill over 100 American POWs in the Palawan Massacre.
: Units of Air Group 80 from USS Ticonderoga flew seven strikes against Japanese positions in northern Luzon in the Philippines.

15: Americans and Filipinos land troops at Mindoro island in the Philippines.
: Bandleader and US Army Major Glenn Miller went missing as his single-engine transport was crossing the English Channel; he was headed to Paris to work out arrangements to entertain troops in France.
: German forces evacuate Ruhnu island, their last outpost in Estonia. The Soviets capture the island on 19 December.

16: The Battle of the Bulge begins as German forces attempt a breakthrough in the Ardennes region. The main object of Hitler's plan is the retaking of Antwerp.

17: The Malmedy massacre: SS troops execute 84 American prisoners in the Ardennes offensive. The SS troops are led by SS commander Joachim Peiper.
: Typhoon Cobra hits the Third Fleet of Admiral Halsey; three destroyers capsize and almost 800 lives are lost.

18: Bastogne, an important crossroads, is surrounded.

22: The battle for Bastogne is at its height, with soldiers of the 101st Airborne Division running low on ammunition, food and other vital supplies. Brigadier General Anthony McAuliffe's famous "Nuts!" reply is sent to German commanders at Bastogne demanding surrender; the news of the message serves to bolster morale of the Allied troops.

23: The skies clear over the Ardennes, permitting Allied aircraft to begin their attacks on the German offensive, the one factor that Hitler feared in his planning.

24: The American counter-attack at the "Bulge" begins.
: The Belgian transport ship SS Leopoldville is sunk off the coast of France. More than 800 lives, predominantly those of American servicemen, are lost.
: Manchester is attacked by V1 flying bombs

26: The siege of Bastogne is broken by Patton's Third Army tanks, and with it the Ardennes offensive collapses into failure.
: Racial tensions within the US military boil over into the Agana race riot on Guam.

28: Churchill and his Foreign Secretary Anthony Eden are in Athens in an attempt to reconcile the warring factions.

29: Soviet troops begin the Siege of Budapest.

31: The Soviet-backed Hungarian Provisional Government declares war on Germany.

== See also ==
- Strategic operations of the Red Army in World War II
- Timeline of World War II (1945)
