= Duke of York (ship) =

A number of ships have been named Duke of York after numerous holders of the title of Duke of York (or Duke of York and Albany):

- Duke of York (1716 EIC ship), an East Indiaman that made four voyages for the British East India Company between 1717 and 1731.
- Duke of York (1764 ship) was a Greenland whaler and the former HMS Terror (1741).
- Duke of York (1797 ship) was a French ship taken in prize in 1797. She was wrecked in October 1805.
- Duke of York (1780 ship) was built at Archangel, and wrecked on 11 September 1787 at New Years Harbour.

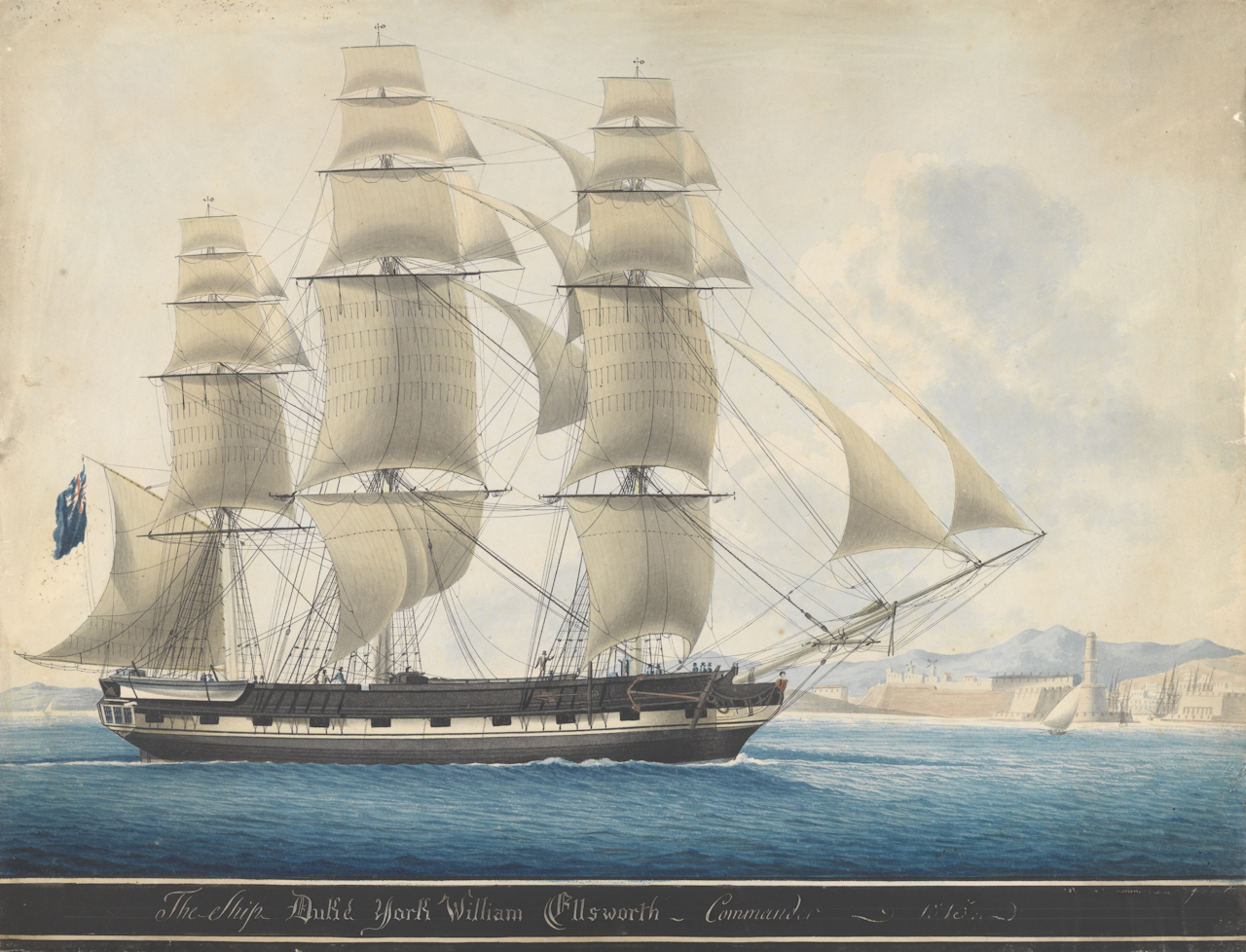
The Duke of York of 1811. William Ellsworth, commander, ca. 1815, by Nicolas Cammillieri

- Duke of York (1811 ship), of 346 tons (bm), was launched by R.J.Bulmer, of South Shields. In 1815 she was a government transport. She then became a West Indiaman. She was last listed in 1824.
- Duke of York was the brig Sophia, of 120 tons (bm), built c. 1812, that the government in Van Diemen's Land purchased in 1822 and renamed. The government hulked her in 1826 at Hobart and used her to house convicts. She was beached c.1840-1 due to her poor state. The government advertised her for sale in 1843 but she may have been broken up and the remains buried in landfill.
- Duke of York (1817 EIC ship), was an East Indiaman that made eight voyages for the British East India Company between 1817 and 1832, and that during her ninth voyage was driven on shore by a hurricane 21 May 1832 and condemned at Calcutta on 6 June.
- Duke of York (1817 ship) was a barque launched in 1817 at Bidford as a Falmouth packet, sailing between Falmouth and Jamaica. In 1836 she brought the first settlers to South Australia for the South Australia Company. She was wrecked in 1837.
- Duke of York, a hired brigantine wrecked off Guadeloupe in December 1838
- TSS Duke of York (1894) was built for the London and North Western Railway, sold in 1911, and renamed Peel Castle. She served during World War I as an armed boarding vessel, returned to civilian service in 1919, and was broken up in 1939.
- Duke of York, built for the London, Midland and Scottish Railway, passing to British Railways and in service until sold in 1964. In 1942 the Royal Navy requisitioned her, renamed her Prince of Wellington, and converted her to a "Landing Ship, Infantry (Hand-Hoisting)"; as such she participated in the raid on Dieppe and the Normandy Landings.

== See also ==
- HMS Duke of York, either of two ships of the British Royal Navy
- HM Hired armed cutter Duke of York
- HM Hired armed lugger Duke of York
