= HMS Duke of York =

Two ships of the Royal Navy have borne the name HMS Duke of York, after numerous holders of the title of Duke of York (or Duke of York and Albany):

- HMS Duke of York (1763) was a 4-gun cutter purchased in 1763 and sold in 1776
- HMS Duke of York (17) was a King George V-class battleship launched in 1940, and broken up in 1958. The original plan was to name her HMS Anson, but she was renamed prior to launch and the name was given to the next ship in her class instead.

== Battle honours ==
Ships named Duke of York have earned the following battle honours: (Note: In the Royal Navy, and other Commonwealth navies that follow the traditions of the RN, battle honours awarded to a ship are inherited by subsequent ships to bear the same name, and are displayed on the ship's honours board.)

- Arctic, 1942−43
- North Africa, 1942
- North Cape, 1943

== See also ==
- Hired armed cutter Duke of York
- Hired armed lugger Duke of York
- Duke of York (ship)

== Bibliography ==
- Colledge, J. J.; Warlow, Ben (2006) [1969]. Ships of the Royal Navy: The Complete Record of All Fighting Ships of the Royal Navy from the 15th Century to the Present (3rd Rev ed.). London: Chatham Publishing. ISBN 978-1-86176-281-8. OCLC 67375475.
- Winfield, Rif (2008). British Warships in the Age of Sail 1793–1817: Design, Construction, Careers and Fates. Seaforth. ISBN 978-1-86176-246-7.
