= Duke of York (disambiguation) =

Duke of York is a British noble title.

Duke of York, The Duke of York, or The Duke of York's may also refer to:

== People ==
- List of dukes of York, including
  - Andrew Mountbatten-Windsor (born 1960), second son of Elizabeth II and Duke of York since 1986 (Note: Although Andrew is currently Duke of York legally, he is not entitled to use the title as of 2025.)

== Buildings ==
=== Lodging ===
- Duke of York Hotel, Toronto, Ontario, Canada
- Duke of York, Ganwick Corner, Hertfordshire, England, United Kingdom

=== Pubs ===
- Duke of York, Bloomsbury, London, England
- Duke of York, Elton, Derbyshire, England
- Duke of York, Leysters, Herefordshire, England
- The Duke of York, Fitzrovia, London
- The Duke of York, Gate Helmsley, North Yorkshire, England

=== Schools ===
- Duke of York's Royal Military School, Guston, Kent, England, United Kingdom
- Lenana School, Nairobi, Kenya, known as Duke of York School from 1949 to 1969

== Places ==
- Duke of York Island (disambiguation), various islands

=== Canada ===
- Duke of York Archipelago, Nunavut
- Duke of York Bay, Nunavut

== Transportation ==
- Duke of York, an 1897 GWR 3031 Class locomotive
- Duke of York (ship), various ships

== Other uses ==
- Duke of York, a variety of potato

== See also ==
- Duke of York Rural LLG, Papua New Guinea
- "The Grand Old Duke of York", an English nursery rhyme, 1642
- Portrait of Prince Frederick, Duke of York, by Thomas Lawrence, 1816
- Portrait of Frederick, Duke of York (Wilkie), 1823
- Ramoaaina language, spoken on the Duke of York Islands, Papua New Guinea
- Prince Andrew (disambiguation)
- York (disambiguation)
  - York (surname)
