= Duke of York's =

Duke of York's may refer to:

- Duke of York Hotel, Toronto, a pub/restaurant in Toronto, Canada
- Duke of York Rural LLG, New Britain, Papua New Guinea

== United Kingdom ==
- Duke of York, Bloomsbury, a pub in London, England
- Duke of York, Leysters, a pub in Herefordshire, England
- Duke of York's Greek Light Infantry Regiment, a British Army regiment active in 1810–16
- Duke of York's Headquarters, a former military barracks in Chelsea, London
- Duke of York's Picture House, Brighton, a cinema in Brighton, England
- Duke of York's Royal Military School, a school in Dover
- Duke of York's Theatre, a theatre in London

== See also ==
- Duke of York
- Duke of York Island (disambiguation)
- The Grand Old Duke of York
