= Duke of York =

Title of nobility

Dukedom of York
- Creation date: 23 June 1986; 40 years ago
- Creation: Eighth
- Created by: Elizabeth II
- Peerage: Peerage of the United Kingdom
- First holder: Edmund of Langley
- Present holder: Andrew Mountbatten-Windsor (not using title)
- Remainder to: the 1st Duke's heirs male of the body lawfully begotten
- Subsidiary titles: Earl of Inverness; Baron Killyleagh
- Status: Extant, not in use

Duke of York is a title of nobility in the Peerage of the United Kingdom. Since the 15th century, it has, when granted, usually been given to the second son of English (later British) monarchs. The analogous title in the Scottish peerage was Duke of Albany.

Initially granted in the 14th century in the Peerage of England, the title Duke of York has been created eight times. The title Duke of York and Albany has been created three times. These occurred during the 18th century, following the 1707 unification of the Kingdom of England and Kingdom of Scotland into a single, united realm. The double naming was done so that a territorial designation from each of the previously separate realms could be included.

The title was most recently awarded by Queen Elizabeth II to her second son, the then-Prince Andrew, at the time of his wedding in 1986. In October 2025, amid controversy surrounding Andrew's ties to child sex offender Jeffrey Epstein, Buckingham Palace announced that King Charles III had started a "formal process" to remove his brother's style, titles, and honours. Andrew's name was removed from the Roll of the Peerage the same day. This did not revoke his peerages, which can only be done by act of Parliament and not personally through the Sovereign's prerogatives, but means he is no longer entitled to any place in the orders of precedence derived from them and that he will cease to be addressed or referred to by any title derived from his peerages in public life, as well as official documents.

== History ==
In the Middle Ages, York was a main city of Northern England. It remains the seat of the archbishop of York since AD 735. Yorkshire is England's largest shire in area.

York under its Viking name "Jorvik" was a petty kingdom in the Early Middle Ages. In the interval between the fall of independent Jorvik under Eric Bloodaxe, last king of Jorvik (d. 954), and the first creation of the Dukedom of York, there were a few earls of York.

The title Duke of York was first created in the Peerage of England in 1385 for Edmund of Langley, the fifth son of Edward III of England. His son Edward of Norwich, 2nd Duke of York, who inherited the title, was killed at the Battle of Agincourt in 1415. The title passed to Edward's nephew Richard, 3rd Duke of York, the son of Richard of Conisburgh, 3rd Earl of Cambridge (who had been executed for plotting against King Henry V). The younger Richard managed to obtain a restoration of the title, but when his eldest son, who inherited it, became king in 1461 as Edward IV, the title merged into the Crown.

The title was next created for Richard of Shrewsbury, second son of King Edward IV. Richard was one of the Princes in the Tower, and, as he disappeared and was presumed dead without heirs, the title was considered extinct.

The third creation was for Henry Tudor, second son of King Henry VII. When his elder brother Arthur, Prince of Wales, died in 1502, Henry became heir-apparent to the throne. When Henry ultimately became King Henry VIII in 1509, his titles merged into the crown.

The title was created for the fourth time for Charles Stuart, second son of James I. When his elder brother, Henry Frederick, Prince of Wales, died in 1612, Charles became heir-apparent. He was created Prince of Wales in 1616 and eventually became Charles I in 1625 when the title again merged into the Crown.

The fifth creation was in favour of James Stuart, the second son of Charles I. New York, its capital Albany, and New York City, were named for James Stuart, who was Duke of Albany and Duke of York. In 1664, Charles II of England granted American territory between the Delaware and Connecticut rivers to his younger brother James. Following its capture by the English the former Dutch territory of New Netherland and its principal port, New Amsterdam, were named the Province and City of New York in James's honour. After the founding, the Duke gave part of the colony to proprietors George Carteret and John Berkeley. Fort Orange, 150 miles (240 km) north on the Hudson River, was renamed Albany after James's Scottish title. When his elder brother, King Charles II, died without heirs, James succeeded to the throne and the title once again merged into the Crown.

During the 18th century the dukedom of York and Albany was created three times in the Peerage of Great Britain. The title was first held by Duke Ernest Augustus of Brunswick-Lüneburg, Bishop of Osnabrück, the youngest brother of King George I. He died without heirs, and the dukedoms became extinct. The second creation of the double dukedom was for Prince Edward, younger brother of King George III, who also died without heirs, having never married. Again, the title became extinct. The third and last creation of the double dukedom was for Prince Frederick Augustus, the second son of King George III. He served as Commander-in-Chief of the British Army for many years. He too died without legitimate heirs, leaving the title, once again, to become extinct and revert to the Crown.

The sixth creation of the Dukedom of York (without being combined with Albany) was for Prince George, second son of the then Prince of Wales, the future King Edward VII. George was created Duke of York following the death of his elder brother, Prince Albert Victor, Duke of Clarence and Avondale. The title merged with the Crown when George succeeded his father.

The seventh creation was for Prince Albert, second son of King George V, and younger brother of the future King Edward VIII. Albert came unexpectedly to the throne when his brother abdicated, and took the name George VI, the Dukedom again merging into the Crown.

The title was created for the eighth time for Prince Andrew, as he then was, the second son of Queen Elizabeth II. As a result of his marriage to Sarah Ferguson, his only legitimate issue are two daughters: Princess Beatrice and Princess Eugenie. As he had no legitimate sons during his tenure, the title would have again become extinct and reverted to the Crown upon his death.

Andrew "stepped back" from royal duties in 2019 following an episode of the BBC's news and current affairs programme Newsnight, in which he was interviewed about his relationship with Jeffrey Epstein, the American financier and convicted sex offender. On 17 October 2025, following discussions with the King, Andrew agreed to cease using his titles of Duke of York, Earl of Inverness and Baron Killyleagh, although legally he still held them. On 30 October 2025 Buckingham Palace issued a statement announcing that King Charles III had begun a "formal process" to remove Andrew's style, titles, and honours. His name was subsequently removed from the Roll of the Peerage which means the title cannot be used on official documents, though he legally remains Duke of York, Earl of Inverness, and Baron Killyleagh, because depriving a person of the peerage requires parliamentary action, and removal of a peer's name from the Roll of the Peerage does not extinguish the peerage. The dukedom has not been returned to the Crown and if Andrew were to have a legitimate son, that son would inherit the dukedom.

Aside from the first creation, every time the Dukedom of York has been created it has had only one occupant, that person either inheriting the throne or dying without male heirs.

=== Pretenders ===
In the late 15th century, Perkin Warbeck unsuccessfully claimed the Crown by claiming the identity of Richard of Shrewsbury, Duke of York.

In the early 18th century, the eldest son of the overthrown King James II & VII and thus Jacobite claimant to the throne, James Francis Edward Stuart, known to his opponents as the Old Pretender, granted the title "Duke of York" (in the Jacobite Peerage) to his own second son, Henry, using his purported authority as King James III & VIII. Henry later became a cardinal in the Catholic church and is thus known as the Cardinal Duke of York. Since James was not recognised as king by English law, the grant is also not recognised as a legitimate creation.

== Dukes of York ==
=== First creation, 1385–1461 ===
Duke	Portrait	Birth	Marriage(s)	Death	Arms
Edmund of Langley; 1385–1402 also: Earl of Cambridge (1362)	Edmund of Langley	5 June 1341; Kings Langley 4th surviving son of King Edward III and Philippa of Hainault	Isabella of Castile; 11 July 1372 - 23 December 1392; 3 children Joan Holland c. 4 November 1393 no children	1 August 1402; Epworth, Lincolnshire aged 61	
Edward of Norwich; 1402–1415 also: Duke of Aumale (1397–1399), Earl of Cambridge (1362–1414), Earl of Rutland (1390–1402), Earl of Cork (c. 1396)	Edward of Norwich	1373; Norwich son of 1st Duke by his first wife Isabella of Castile	Philippa Mohun before 7 October 1398 no children	25 October 1415; Battle of Agincourt aged 42	
Richard of York; 1415–1460 also: Lord Protector of England (1460, see Act of Accord); Earl of Ulster (1264), Earl of March (1328), Earl of Cambridge (1414, restored 1426), feudal Lord of Clare (bt. 1066–1075), Baron Mortimer of Wigmore (1331)		21 September 1411 Nephew of 2nd Duke and son of Richard of Conisburgh, 3rd Earl of Cambridge (attainted and executed for treason in August 1415) and Anne de Mortimer; restored in blood	Cecily Neville; 1437; 13 children	30 December 1460; Wakefield aged 49	
Edward Plantagenet; 1460–1461 also: Earl of Ulster (1264), Earl of March (1328), Earl of Cambridge (1414), feudal Lord of Clare (bt. 1066–1075), Baron Mortimer of Wigmore (1331)	Edward Plantagenet	28 April 1442; Rouen son of 3rd Duke by his wife Cecily Neville	(After dukedom); Elizabeth Woodville; 1 May 1464; 10 children	9 April 1483; Westminster aged 40	

Edward Plantagenet seized the throne in 1461 as Edward IV and the title of duke merged with the crown.

=== Second creation, 1474 ===
Duke	Portrait	Birth	Marriage(s)	Death	Arms
Richard of Shrewsbury; 1474–1483 also: Duke of Norfolk (1477), Earl of Norfolk (1477), Earl of Nottingham (1476), possibly Earl of Warenne (1477)	Richard of Shrewsbury	17 August 1473; Shrewsbury Second son of King Edward IV and Elizabeth Woodville	Anne de Mowbray; 15 January 1478 no children	Disappeared in the Tower of London, with his older brother, the "Princes in the Tower".	

Richard disappeared without issue and the title of duke became extinct.

=== Third creation, 1494 ===
Duke	Portrait	Birth	Marriage(s)	Death	Arms
Henry Tudor; 1494–1509 also: Prince of Wales (1504), Duke of Cornwall (1502)	Henry Tudor	28 June 1491; Greenwich Palace, London son of Henry VII and Elizabeth of York	(All after dukedom) Catherine of Aragon; 11 June 1509 – 23 May 1533 (annulment); 1 surviving daughter, others stillborn or briefly-lived Anne Boleyn; 25 January 1533 – 17 May 1536 (annulment); 1 daughter Jane Seymour; 30 May 1536 – 24 October 1537; 1 son Anne of Cleves; 6 January 1540 – 9 July 1540 (annulment) no children Catherine Howard; 28 July 1540 – 23 November 1541 no children Catherine Parr; 12 July 1543 no children	28 January 1547; Whitehall Palace, London aged 55	

Henry succeeded as king in 1509 upon his father's death and the title of duke merged with the crown.

=== Fourth creation, 1605 ===
Duke	Portrait	Birth	Marriage(s)	Death	Arms
Charles Stuart; 1605–1625 also: Duke of Albany (1600); Prince of Wales (1616), Duke of Cornwall and Duke of Rothesay (1612)	Charles Stuart	19 November 1600; Dunfermline Palace, Dunfermline son of James I and Anne of Denmark	(After dukedom); Henrietta Maria of France; 13 June 1625; 9 children	30 January 1649; Whitehall Palace, London aged 48	

Charles succeeded as king in 1625 upon his father's death and the title of duke merged with the crown.

=== Fifth creation, 1633/1644 ===
James was styled Duke of York from birth and officially created as such in 1644.

Duke	Portrait	Birth	Marriage(s)	Death	Arms
James Stuart; 1633/1644–1685 also: Duke of Albany (1660), Earl of Ulster (1659)	James Stuart	14 October 1633; St. James's Palace, London son of Charles I and Henrietta Maria of France	Anne Hyde; 3 September 1660; 8 children Mary of Modena; 21 November 1673; 7 children	16 September 1701; Château de Saint-Germain-en-Laye, Paris aged 67	

James succeeded as king in 1685 upon his brother's death and the title of duke merged with the crown.

=== Jacobite creation, 1725 ===
Duke	Portrait	Birth	Marriage(s)	Death	Arms
Henry Benedict Stuart; 1725–1788 also: Cardinal of the Holy Roman Church (1747), Dean of the College of Cardinals (1803)	Cardinal Stuart	6 March 1725; Palazzo Muti; Rome; Papal States son of "James III and VIII" (Jacobite Pretender) and Maria Clementina Sobieska	Not married	13 July 1807; Frascati, Rome aged 82	

Henry succeeded his brother as Jacobite pretender to the thrones of England, Ireland and Scotland in 1788, but was not recognized in Britain as a Duke, let alone as King.

=== Sixth creation, 1892 ===
Also Earl of Inverness and Baron Killarney.

Duke	Portrait	Birth	Marriage(s)	Death	Arms
George Frederick Ernest Albert; 1892–1910 also: Prince of Wales, Duke of Cornwall, and Duke of Rothesay (1901)	Prince George	3 June 1865; Marlborough House Son of Edward VII and Alexandra of Denmark	Mary of Teck; 6 July 1893; 6 children	20 January 1936; Sandringham House, Sandringham aged 70	

George succeeded as king in 1910 upon his father's death and the title of duke merged with the crown.

=== Seventh creation, 1920 ===
Also Earl of Inverness and Baron Killarney.

Duke	Portrait	Birth	Marriage(s)	Death	Arms
Albert Frederick Arthur George; 1920–1936		14 December 1895; York Cottage, Sandringham Son of George V and Mary of Teck	Elizabeth Bowes-Lyon; 26 April 1923; 2 daughters	6 February 1952; Sandringham House, Sandringham aged 56	

Albert succeeded as king in 1936 upon his brother's abdication and the title of duke merged with the crown. As Albert had no male issue, the title would have gone extinct in any case, even if he had not become king.

=== Eighth creation, 1986 ===
Also: Earl of Inverness and Baron Killyleagh.

Duke	Portrait	Birth	Marriage(s)	Death	Arms
Andrew Albert Christian Edward; 1986–present		19 February 1960; Buckingham Palace Son of Elizabeth II and Prince Philip, Duke of Edinburgh	Sarah Ferguson; 23 July 1986 – 30 May 1996 (divorce); 2 daughters	Still living	

On 17 October 2025, Andrew announced he would no longer use the title "Duke of York" and its subsidiary titles. On 30 October 2025, Buckingham Palace announced that formal proceedings had begun to remove Andrew's titles, including that of "prince", and that he would be known as Andrew Mountbatten-Windsor. As of 30 October 2025, his name has been removed from the Roll of the Peerage. While this strips him of the right to use the title in official documents, the title can actually be removed only by an act of Parliament. The title will not be issued again until after Andrew's death.

== Family trees ==
Peerages of Albany, Arklow, Inverness, Ulster and York family tree

Earl of Ulster (1st Irish creation), 1205
Hugh de Lacy c. 1176–1271; Earl of Ulster
Earl of Ulster (2nd Irish creation), 1264
Maud de Lacy	Walter de Burgh c. 1210–1271; 1st Earl of Ulster, 2nd Lord of Connaught
Richard Óg de Burgh; 1259–1326; 2nd Earl of Ulster
John de Burgh d. 1313
Robert II of Scotland; 1316–1390	Edward III of England; 1312–1377	William Donn de Burgh; 1312–1333; 3rd Earl of Ulster
Lionel of Antwerp; 1338–1368; Duke of Clarence, Earl of Ulster (jure uxoris)	Elizabeth de Burgh; 1332–1363; 4th Countess of Ulster suo jure
Duke of Albany (1st creation), 1398	Duke of York (1st creation), 1385
Robert III of Scotland; 1337–1406	Robert Stewart c. 1340–1420; 1st Duke of Albany	Edmund of Langley; 1341–1402; 1st Duke of York	Philippa of Clarence; 1355–1382; 5th Countess of Ulster
Murdoch Stewart; 1362–1425; 2nd Duke of Albany	Roger Mortimer; 1374–1398; 6th Earl of Ulster, Earl of March
Dukedom of Albany (1st creation) forfeit, 1425
Edward of Norwich; 1373–1415; 2nd Duke of York	Richard of Conisburgh; 1375–1415; Earl of Cambridge	Anne Mortimer; 1388–c. 1411	Edmund Mortimer; 1391–1425; 7th Earl of Ulster, Earl of March
James I of Scotland; 1394–1437	Richard of York; 1411–1460; 3rd Duke of York, 8th Earl of Ulster, Earl of March
James II of Scotland; 1430–1460	Prince Edward; 1442–1483; 4th Duke of York, 9th Earl of Ulster, Earl of March; Later Edward IV of England
Dukedom of York (1st creation) and Earldom of Ulster (2nd Irish creation) merged in the Crown, 1461
Duke of Albany (2nd creation), 1458	Duke of York (2nd creation), 1474
Alexander Stewart; 1454–1485; 1st Duke of Albany	James III of Scotland; 1451–1488	Elizabeth of York; 1466–1503	Richard of Shrewsbury; 1473–1483; Duke of York
Dukedom of Albany (2nd creation) forfeit, 1479 restored, 1482 forfeited, 1483	Dukedom of York (2nd creation) extinct, 1483
Duke of Albany (2nd creation) restored, 1515	Duke of York (3rd creation), 1494
John Stewart; 1484–1536; 2nd Duke of Albany	James IV of Scotland; 1473–1513	Margaret Tudor; 1489–1541	Prince Henry; 1491–1547; Duke of York; Later Henry VIII of England
Dukedom of Albany (2nd creation) extinct, 1536	Dukedom of York (3rd creation) merged in the Crown, 1509
James V of Scotland; 1512–1542
Duke of Albany (3rd creation), 1565
Prince Arthur Stewart; 1541 styled Duke of Albany	Mary, Queen of Scots; 1542–1587	Henry Stuart, Lord Darnley; 1545–1567; 1st Duke of Albany
Prince James; 1566–1625; 2nd Duke of Albany; Later James VI & I of Scotland and England
Dukedom of Albany (3rd creation) merged in the Crown, 1567
Duke of Albany (4th creation), 1604; Duke of York (4th creation), 1605
Henry Frederick; 1594–1612	Elizabeth Stuart; 1596–1662	Prince Charles; 1600–1649; Duke of Albany, Duke of York; Later Charles I of Scotland and England
Dukedoms of York (4th creation) and Albany (4th creation) merged in the Crown, 1625
Duke of York (5th creation) 1644; Earl of Ulster (3rd Irish creation), 1659; Duke of Albany (5th creation), 1660
Sophia of Hanover; 1630–1714	Charles II of Scotland and England; 1630–1685	James Stuart; 1633–1701; Duke of York, Duke of Albany, Earl of Ulster; Later James II of Scotland and England
Dukedoms of Albany (5th creation) and York (5th creation), and Earldom of Ulster (3rd Irish creation) merged in the Crown, 1685
Duke of York and Albany (1st creation) and Earl of Ulster (4th Irish creation), 1716
George I of Great Britain; 1660–1727	Ernest Augustus; 1674–1728; Prince-Bishop of Osnabrück, Duke of York and Albany, Earl of Ulster
Dukedom of York and Albany (1st creation) and Earldom of Ulster (4th Irish creation) extinct, 1728
George II of Great Britain; 1683–1760
Prince Frederick Louis; 1707–1751; Duke of Gloucester, Duke of Edinburgh
Duke of York and Albany (2nd creation) and Earl of Ulster (5th Irish creation), 1760
George III of the United Kingdom; 1738–1820	Prince Edward; 1739–1767; Duke of York and Albany
Dukedom of York and Albany (2nd creation) and Earldom of Ulster (5th Irish creation) extinct, 1767
Duke of York and Albany (3rd creation) and Earl of Ulster (6th Irish creation), 1784	Earl of Inverness (1st creation), and Baron Arklow (1st creation), 1801
George IV of the United Kingdom; 1762–1830	Prince Frederick; 1763–1827; Duke of York and Albany	Prince Edward; 1767–1820; Duke of Kent and Strathearn	Prince Augustus Frederick; 1773–1843; Duke of Sussex, Earl of Inverness and Baron Arklow
Dukedom of York and Albany (3rd creation) and Earldom of Ulster (6th Irish creation) extinct, 1827	Earldom of Inverness and Barony Arklow extinct, 1843
Queen Victoria of the United Kingdom; 1819–1901
Earl of Ulster (1st UK creation), 1866	Duke of Albany (6th creation), Earl of Clarence, and Baron Arklow (2nd creation), 1881
Edward VII of the United Kingdom; 1841–1910	Prince Alfred Ernest Albert; 1844–1900; Duke of Edinburgh, Duke of Saxe-Coburg and Gotha, Earl of Ulster	Prince Leopold; 1853–1884; Duke of Saxe-Coburg and Gotha, 1st Duke of Albany, Earl of Clarence, and Baron Arklow
Earldom of Ulster (1st UK creation) extinct, 1900
Duke of York (6th creation), Earl of Inverness (2nd creation) and Baron Killarney (1st creation), 1892
Prince Albert Victor; 1864–1892; Duke of Clarence and Avondale	Prince George; 1865–1936; Duke of York, Earl of Inverness, and Baron Killarney; Later George V of the United Kingdom	Charles Edward; 1884–1954; Duke of Saxe-Coburg and Gotha, 2nd Duke of Albany, Earl of Clarence, and Baron Arklow
Dukedom of York (6th creation), Earldom of Inverness (2nd creation), Barony Killarney (1st creation) merged in the Crown, 1910	Dukedom of Albany (6th creation) forfeit, 1919
Duke of York (7th creation), Earl of Inverness (3rd creation) and Baron Killarney (2nd creation), 1920	Earl of Ulster (2nd UK creation), 1928
Edward VIII of the United Kingdom; 1894–1972; Duke of Windsor	Prince Albert; 1895–1952; Duke of York; Later George VI of the United Kingdom	Prince Henry; 1900–1974; Duke of Gloucester, 1st Earl of Ulster
Dukedom of York (7th creation), Earldom of Inverness (3rd creation), Barony Killarney (2nd creation) merged in the Crown, 1936
Elizabeth II of the United Kingdom; 1926–2022
Duke of York (8th creation), Earl of Inverness (4th creation) and Baron Killyleagh, 1986
Charles III of the United Kingdom b. 1948	Andrew Mountbatten-Windsor b. 1960; Duke of York, Earl of Inverness, and Baron Killyleagh	Prince Richard b. 1944; Duke of Gloucester, 2nd Earl of Ulster
Alexander Windsor b. 1974 styled Earl of Ulster
Heir apparent to the Earldom of Ulster

Family tree of British royal dukes

Includes dukes of: Albany, Albemarle, Bedford, Cambridge, Clarence, Connaught and Strathearn, Cumberland, Edinburgh, Gloucester, Gloucester and Edinburgh, Hereford, Kent, Kintyre and Lorne, Norfolk, Ross, Somerset, Sussex, Windsor, and York, but only when royally.

Non-royal dukes are not included; see Royal dukedoms in the United Kingdom.
Also not included are titles mandated for use by the heir apparent (Duke of Rothesay and the 1337 creation of the Duke of Cornwall), see Princes of Wales family tree.

King Robert II; 1316–1390	King Edward III; 1312–1377
Duke of Albany (1st creation), 1398	Duke of Clarence (1st creation), 1362	Duke of York (1st creation), 1385
King Robert III c. 1337–1406	Robert Stewart c. 1340–1420; 1st Duke of Albany	Edward the Black Prince; 1330–1376	Lionel of Antwerp; 1338–1368; Duke of Clarence	John of Gaunt; 1340–1399	Edmund; 1341–1402; 1st Duke of York
Dukedom of Clarence (1st creation) extinct, 1368
Duke of Cornwall (2nd creation), 1376	Duke of Hereford, 1397	Duke of Gloucester (1st creation), 1385
Murdoch Stewart c. 1362–1425; 2nd Duke of Albany	Richard of Bordeaux; 1367–1400; Duke of Cornwall, later King Richard II	Henry Bolingbroke; 1367–1413; Duke of Hereford, later King Henry IV	Thomas of Woodstock; 1355–1397; Duke of Gloucester
Dukedom of Albany (1st creation) forfeit, 1425	Dukedom of Cornwall (2nd creation) merged in the crown, 1377	Dukedom of Hereford merged in the crown, 1399	Dukedom of Gloucester (1st creation) extinct, 1397
Duke of Clarence (2nd creation), 1412	Duke of Bedford (1st & 2nd creations), 1414	Duke of Gloucester (2nd creation), 1414	Duke of Albemarle (Aumale) (1st creation), 1397
Thomas of Lancaster; 1387–1421; Duke of Clarence	John of Lancaster; 1389–1435; Duke of Bedford; Surrendered dukedom and then regranted, 1433	Humphrey of Lancaster; 1390–1447; Duke of Gloucester	John Beaufort; 1373–1410	Joan Beaufort c. 1379–1440	Edward of Norwich c. 1373–1415; Duke of Aumale, 2nd Duke of York	Richard of Conisburgh; 1385–1415
Dukedom of Clarence (2nd creation) extinct, 1421	Dukedom of Bedford (2nd creation) extinct, 1435	Dukedom of Gloucester (2nd creation) extinct, 1447	Dukedom of Albemarle (Aumale) (1st creation) forfeit, 1399
Duke of York (1st creation) restored, 1425; Duke of Cornwall (3rd creation), 1460
King James I 1394–1437	Joan Beaufort c. 1404–1445	Owen Tudor c. 1400–1461	John Beaufort; 1404–1444	Richard Neville; 1400–1460	Cecily Neville; 1415–1495	Richard of York; 1411–1460; 3rd Duke of York, Duke of Cornwall
Duke of Cornwall (3rd creation) extinct, 1460
Duke of Bedford (5th creation), 1485	Duke of Clarence (3rd creation), 1461	Duke of Gloucester (3rd creation), 1461
King James II; 1430–1460	Jasper Tudor c. 1431–1495; Duke of Bedford	Edmund Tudor c. 1430–1456	Lady Margaret Beaufort; 1443–1509	John Neville c. 1431–1471	Elizabeth Woodville c. 1437–1492	Edward; 1442–1483; 4th Duke of York, later King Edward IV	George Plantagenet; 1449–1478; Duke of Clarence	Richard of York; 1452–1485; Duke of Gloucester, later King Richard III
Dukedom of Bedford (5th creation) extinct, 1495	Dukedom of York (1st creation) merged in the Crown, 1461	Dukedom of Clarence (3rd creation) forfeit, 1478	Dukedom of Gloucester (3rd creation) merged in the Crown, 1483
Duke of Albany (2nd creation), 1458	Duke of Bedford (3rd creation), 1470	Duke of York (2nd creation), 1474; Duke of Norfolk (3rd creation), 1477	Duke of Bedford (4th creation), 1478
Alexander Stewart c. 1454–1485; 1st Duke of Albany	King James III; 1451/1452–1488	George Neville; 1457–1483; Duke of Bedford	King Henry VII; 1457–1509	Elizabeth of York; 1466–1503	Richard of Shrewsbury; 1473–1483; Duke of York, Duke of Norfolk	George of York; 1477–1479; Duke of Bedford
Dukedom of Bedford (3rd creation) forfeit, 1478	Dukedom of York (2nd creation) and Dukedom of Norfolk (3rd creation) extinct, 1483	Dukedom of Bedford (4th creation) extinct, 1479
Duke of Ross (1st creation), 1488	Duke of York (3rd creation), 1494	Duke of Somerset (3rd creation), 1499
John Stewart; 1482–1536; 2nd Duke of Albany	James Stewart; 1476–1504; Duke of Ross	King James IV; 1473–1513	Margaret Tudor; 1489–1541	Henry; 1491–1547; Duke of York, later King Henry VIII	Edmund Tudor; 1499–1500; Duke of Somerset (nominated but probably not invested)
Dukedom of Albany (2nd creation) extinct, 1536	Dukedom of Ross (1st creation) extinct, 1504	Dukedom of York (3rd creation) merged in the Crown, 1509	Dukedom of Somerset (3rd creation) extinct, 1500
Duke of Ross (2nd creation), 1514
King James V 1512–1542	Alexander Stewart; 1514–1515; Duke of Ross
Duke of Albany (3rd creation), 1565	Dukedom of Ross (2nd creation) extinct, 1515
Henry Stuart; 1546–1567; 1st Duke of Albany	Queen Mary; 1542–1587
James; 1566–1625; 2nd Duke of Albany, later King James VI & I
Dukedom of Albany (3rd creation) merged in the Crown, 1567
Duke of Albany (4th creation), 1604; Duke of York (4th creation), 1605	Duke of Kintyre and Lorne, 1602
Elizabeth Stuart; 1596–1662	Henry Frederick; 1594–1612	Charles; 1600–1649; Duke of Albany, Duke of York, later King Charles I	Robert Stuart; 1602; Duke of Kintyre and Lorne
Dukedom of Albany (4th creation), Dukedom of York (4th creation) merged in the Crown, 1625	Dukedom of Kintyre and Lorne extinct, 1602
Duke of York (5th creation) 1644; Duke of Albany (5th creation), 1660	Duke of Gloucester (4th creation), 1659
Sophia of Hanover; 1630–1714	James Stuart; 1633–1701; Duke of York, Duke of Albany, later King James VII & II	Henry; 1640–1660; Duke of Gloucester
Dukedom of Albany (5th creation) and Dukedom of York (5th creation) merged in the Crown, 1685	Dukedom of Gloucester (4th creation) extinct, 1660
Duke of York and Albany (1st creation), 1716	Duke of Cambridge (1st creation), 1664	Duke of Kendal (1st creation), 1666	Duke of Cambridge (2nd creation), 1667
King George I 1660–1727	Ernest Augustus; 1674–1728; Duke of York and Albany	Charles Stuart; 1660–1661 styled Duke of Cambridge	James Stuart; 1663–1667; Duke of Cambridge	Queen Anne; 1665–1714	Charles Stuart; 1666–1667 designated Duke of Kendal	Edgar Stuart; 1667–1671; Duke of Cambridge	Charles Stuart; 1677 styled Duke of Cambridge
Dukedom of York and Albany (1st creation) extinct, 1728	Dukedom of Cambridge (1st creation) extinct, 1667	Dukedom of Kendal (1st creation), extinct, 1667	Dukedom of Cambridge (2nd creation) extinct, 1671
Duke of Cambridge (3rd creation)
George; 1683–1760; Duke of Cambridge, later King George II	William; 1689–1700 styled Duke of Gloucester
Dukedom of Cambridge (3rd creation) merged with the Crown, 1727
Duke of Edinburgh (1st creation), 1726	Duke of Cumberland (3rd creation), 1726
Frederick; 1707–1751; 1st Duke of Edinburgh, styled Duke of Gloucester until created Duke of Edinburgh	William Augustus; 1721–1765; Duke of Cumberland
Dukedom of Cumberland (3rd creation) extinct, 1765
Duke of York and Albany (2nd creation), 1760	Duke of Gloucester and Edinburgh, 1764	Duke of Cumberland and Strathearn, 1766
George; 1738–1820; 2nd Duke of Edinburgh, later King George III	Edward; 1739–1767; Duke of York and Albany	William Henry; 1743–1805; 1st Duke of Gloucester and Edinburgh	Henry; 1745–1790; Duke of Cumberland and Strathearn
Dukedom of Edinburgh (1st creation), merged in the Crown, 1760	Dukedom of York and Albany (2nd creation) extinct, 1767	Dukedom of Cumberland and Strathearn extinct, 1790
Duke of York and Albany (3rd creation), 1784	Duke of Clarence and St Andrews, 1789	Duke of Kent and Strathearn, 1799	Duke of Cumberland and Teviotdale, 1799	Duke of Sussex (1st creation), 1801	Duke of Cambridge (4th creation), 1801
Frederick; 1763–1827; Duke of York and Albany	William Henry; 1765–1837, Duke of Clarence and St Andrews, later King William IV	Edward; 1767–1820; Duke of Kent and Strathearn	Ernest Augustus; 1771–1851; King of Hanover, 1st Duke of Cumberland and Teviotdale	Augustus Frederick; 1773–1843; Duke of Sussex	Adolphus; 1774–1850; 1st Duke of Cambridge	Mary; 1776–1857	William Frederick; 1776–1834; 2nd Duke of Gloucester and Edinburgh
Dukedom of York and Albany (3rd creation) extinct, 1827	Dukedom of Clarence and St Andrews merged in the Crown, 1830	Dukedom of Kent and Strathearn extinct, 1820	Dukedom of Sussex (1st creation) extinct, 1843	Dukedom of Gloucester and Edinburgh extinct, 1834
Queen Victoria; 1819–1901	George V 1819–1878; King of Hanover, 2nd Duke of Cumberland and Teviotdale	George; 1819–1904; 2nd Duke of Cambridge	Mary Adelaide; 1833–1897
Dukedom of Cambridge (4th creation) extinct, 1904
Duke of Edinburgh (2nd creation), 1866	Duke of Connaught and Strathearn, 1874	Duke of Albany (6th creation), 1881
King Edward VII; 1841–1910	Ernest Augustus; 1845–1923; 3rd Duke of Cumberland and Teviotdale	Alice; 1843–1878	Alfred Ernest Albert; 1844–1900; Duke of Edinburgh	Arthur; 1850–1942; 1st Duke of Connaught and Strathearn	Leopold; 1853–1884; 1st Duke of Albany
Dukedom of Cumberland and Teviotdale forfeit, 1919	Dukedom of Edinburgh (2nd creation) extinct, 1900
Duke of Clarence and Avondale, 1890	Duke of York (6th creation), 1892
Albert Victor; 1864–1892; Duke of Clarence and Avondale	George; 1865–1936; Duke of York, later King George V	Mary of Teck; 1867–1953	Victoria of Hesse and by Rhine; 1863–1950	Arthur of Connaught; 1883–1938
Dukedom of Clarence and Avondale extinct, 1892	Dukedom of York (6th creation) merged in the Crown, 1910
Duke of Windsor, 1937	Duke of York (7th creation), 1920	Duke of Kent (2nd creation), 1934	Duke of Gloucester (5th creation), 1928
King Edward VIII; 1894–1972; Later Duke of Windsor	Albert; 1895–1952; Duke of York, later King George VI	Alice of Battenberg; 1885–1969	George; 1902–1942; 1st Duke of Kent	Henry; 1900–1974; 1st Duke of Gloucester	Alastair Arthur; 1914–1943; 2nd Duke of Connaught and Strathearn	Charles Edward; 1884–1954; 2nd Duke of Albany
Dukedom of Windsor extinct, 1972	Dukedom of York (7th creation) merged in the Crown, 1936	Dukedom of Connaught and Strathearn extinct, 1943	Dukedom of Albany (6th creation) forfeit, 1919
Duke of Edinburgh (3rd creation), 1947
Queen Elizabeth II; 1926–2022	Philip; 1921–2021; 1st Duke of Edinburgh	Edward b. 1935; 2nd Duke of Kent
Duke of York (8th creation), 1986 (revoked 2025)	Duke of Edinburgh (4th creation), 2023
Charles b. 1948; 2nd Duke of Edinburgh, later King Charles III	Andrew b. 1960; Duke of York	Edward b. 1964; Duke of Edinburgh	George Windsor b. 1962	Richard b. 1944; 2nd Duke of Gloucester
Dukedom of Edinburgh (3rd creation) merged in the Crown, 2022	No male heirs	Dukedom of Edinburgh (4th creation) is a life peerage and therefore not hereditary	Heir apparent to the Dukedom of Kent
Duke of Cambridge (5th creation), 2011	Duke of Sussex (2nd creation), 2018
William b. 1982; Duke of Cambridge	Harry b. 1984; Duke of Sussex	Edward Windsor b. 1988	Alexander Windsor b. 1974
Heir-apparent to the Dukedom of Gloucester
George of Wales b. 2013	Archie of Sussex b. 2019
Heir apparent to the Dukedom of Cambridge	Heir apparent to the Dukedom of Sussex

== Places and things named after the dukes of York ==
=== Geographic features ===
==== Southern hemisphere ====
- Cape York Peninsula, Australia
- Duke of York Island, Antarctica
- Duke of York Island, Papua New Guinea
- Duke of York Islands, Papua New Guinea

==== Canada ====
- Duke of York Archipelago, Canada
- Duke of York Bay, Canada

=== Political entities ===
==== Canada ====
- York, Upper Canada, now Toronto, Ontario
- York County, New Brunswick, Canada

==== United States ====
- New York, a U.S. state
- New York City, the largest city in the United States.

=== Schools ===
- Duke of York's Royal Military School, Dover, Kent, United Kingdom
- Duke of York School, Nairobi, Kenya, renamed Lenana School after Kenya attained independence in 1963.

=== Pubs ===
- Duke of York, Bloomsbury
- Duke of York Inn, Elton
- The Duke of York, Fitzrovia
- Duke of York, Ganwick Corner

=== Ships ===
- HMS Duke of York (1763), a 4-gun cutter purchased in 1763 and sold in 1776
- HMS Duke of York (17), a King George V-class battleship launched in 1940, and broken up in 1958
- Hired armed cutter Duke of York
- Hired armed lugger Duke of York
- TSS Duke of York (1894)
- TSS Duke of York (1935)

=== Railways ===
- Duke of York was one of the GWR 3031 Class locomotives that were built for and run on the Great Western Railway between 1891 and 1915.

=== Military Music ===
There is also military march titled Duke of York which is used as an inspection piece or slow march. It is in 4/4 time, D Major with a form of AABBCCDD. Gordon Ashman in 1991 maintains that the melody was composed in 1805, soon after the Duke of York became Colonel of the Grenadier Guards, and notes it is still in use today as a regimental slow-march. James Merryweather however, researched the melody and found it was composed by John Gamidge in 1789, to be played by the York Waits.

== Sources ==
- Miller, John (2000). James II, 3rd ed. ISBN 0-300-08728-4.
