= Listed buildings in Gate Helmsley =

Gate Helmsley is a civil parish in the county of North Yorkshire, England. It contains seven listed buildings that are recorded in the National Heritage List for England. Of these, one is listed at Grade II*, the middle of the three grades, and the others are at Grade II, the lowest grade. The parish contains the village of Gate Helmsley and the surrounding area. The listed buildings consist of a church, houses and associated structures, and a public house.

== Key ==
Grade	Criteria
II*	Particularly important buildings of more than special interest
II	Buildings of national importance and special interest

== Buildings ==
Name and location	Photograph	Date	Notes	Grade
St Mary's Church; 53.98841°N 0.94813°W		Early 13th century	The church has been altered and extended through the centuries, the tower dates from the 15th century, and the church was largely rebuilt in 1885–86. It is built in sandstone with a Welsh slate roof, and consists of a nave with a clerestory, north and south aisles, a south porch, a chancel with a north chapel and a south aisle, and a west tower. The tower has three stages, and contains a blocked window, above which is a three-light Perpendicular window, two-light bell openings, and an embattled parapet with crocketed pinnacles.	II*
Fox Farm; 53.98886°N 0.94585°W		Early 18th century	Two houses later combined, in brick, with a stepped and cogged eaves course, and a swept pantile roof with tumbled-in gables. There are two storeys and five bays. The windows are horizontally-sliding sashes, those in the ground floor in brick relieving arches.	II
The Black Horse Inn; 53.98743°N 0.95130°W		Early to mid 18th century	A public house converted into three private houses, in brick, with dentilled eaves courses and pantile roofs, and two storeys. The left house is the oldest and has two bays, a central doorway and horizontally-sliding sash windows. The other houses date from the 19th century. The middle house has two bays, a door on the left, a canted bay window to the right and sash windows above. The right house has one bay, a doorway and canted bay window in the ground floor, and a fixed-light window above.	II
Helmsley House and The Cottage; 53.99257°N 0.92397°W	—	Mid 18th century	A house with an attached barn converted into a cottage, in brick, the house with a Welsh slate roof and bargeboards, and the cottage with a pantile roof. The house has a gabled front with three storeys and three bays and flanking single-storey extensions. The doorway is in the left extension, in the centre of the main block is a canted bay window, in the top floor is a Diocletian window, and the other windows are sashes. Most of the windows have flat brick arches and keystones. The cottage has two storeys, and contains a fixed window in the ground floor and sashes above.	II
Stable and wall, Helmsley House; 53.99272°N 0.92335°W	—	Mid 18th century	The stable and garden wall are in brick. The stable has dentilled eaves, a pantile roof, and a gabled front to the north with two bays. It contains two stable doors and a fixed light, above is a pitching door and a blocked window, and in front is a two-step mounting block. The wall has recesses, it is about 3.5 metres (11 ft) high, and rises to the left over a round-arched opening.	II
The Elms, railings and gates 53.98906°N 0.94549°W		c. 1840	The house is in brick with a floor band and a hipped Welsh slate roof. There are two storeys, a double depth plan, and three bays. In the centre is a Doric porch, and a doorway with an elliptical-headed fanlight. The windows are sashes with channelled stucco wedge lintels and keystones. Enclosing the front garden are wrought iron railings and gates.	II
The Duke of York; 53.98766°N 0.95057°W		Mid 19th century	The public house is in whitewashed brick with a pantile roof. There are two storeys and an L-shaped plan, with a front range of four bays, and a rear wing. The doorway has a Tuscan frame and a dentilled cornice, and the windows are sashes.	II
