= Listed buildings in Elton, Derbyshire =

Elton is a civil parish in the Derbyshire Dales district of Derbyshire, England. The parish contains 20 listed buildings that are recorded in the National Heritage List for England. All the listed buildings are designated at Grade II, the lowest of the three grades, which is applied to "buildings of national importance and special interest". The parish contains the village of Elton and the surrounding countryside. Most of the listed buildings are houses, cottages and associated structures, farmhouses and farm buildings. The other listed buildings consist of a church, and a public house and its associated stables.

== Buildings ==
Name and location	Photograph	Date	Notes
Elton House Farmhouse; 53.14464°N 1.67064°W	—	17th century	The farmhouse is in gritstone, with a coved eaves band, and a stone slate roof with coped gables and kneelers. There are two storeys and four bays. On the front are two doorways, the central one with a massive surround and dated lintel, the doorway to the south with a shallow flat hood, and there is a blocked doorway with a dated lintel. Most of the windows are sashes, and there is a three-light mullioned window.
Baul Cottage; 53.14510°N 1.66850°W	—	1697	The cottage is in gritstone and has a Welsh slate roof with a coped gable on the left. There are two storeys and two bays. On the front are two doorways, the right doorway with a massive quoined surround and lintel, and the left doorway a later insertion. The windows in the upper floor are sashes, and in the ground floor they are later insertions.
1 and 2 Rock Cottage; 53.14445°N 1.66984°W	—	1735	A house, later two cottages, in gritstone, with a roof of slate and tile, coped gables, coping at the division, and moulded kneelers. There are two storeys and three unequal bays. The windows are mullioned, with some mullions missing. There are three doorways, one with a massive surround and a porch, one with stone jambs and lintels, and the other with a quoined surround and an inscribed lintel.
Meadowside; 53.15079°N 1.65915°W		1737	A pair of houses, later combined, in gritstone, with rusticated quoins, a moulded eaves band, and a roof of tile, Welsh slate and stone slate, with coped gables and moulded kneelers. There are two storeys, a staggered double-depth plan, and a front of two bays. The central doorway has coupled doors, each with a moulded architrave, and under a hood mould. The windows have moulded architraves, and over the door is a dated and initialled plaque.
Greengate Farmhouse and Cottage; 53.14528°N 1.66757°W		1747	The farmhouse, later divided, is in limestone with gritstone dressings, quoins, and a tile roof with coped gables and moulded kneelers. There are two storeys, an L-shaped plan, a front range of three bays, and a lean-to outbuilding on the left. On the front are two doorways, the left one has a massive quoined surround, a flat hood on moulded brackets, and a dated plaque above. The right doorway has a Gibbs surround, and the windows are mullioned.
Holmedene Farmhouse; 53.14490°N 1.66989°W		c. 1750	A gritstone farmhouse with rusticated quoins, floor bands, coved eaves, and a stone slate roof with coped gables and moulded kneelers. There are two storeys and attics, and three bays. The doorway has a segmental pediment. The attic windows have single lights, in the lower floors they have two lights and mullions, and all the windows are four-pane casements.
Barker Barn; 53.13646°N 1.67293°W		18th century	The barn is in limestone with gritstone dressings, quoins, a projecting eaves band, and a roof of tile, Welsh slate and stone slate, with coped gables. There is a single storey, four bays, and a low extension to the southeast. The barn contains two doorways with massive surrounds, one blocked to form a window, slit vents, and a taking-in door.
Cliff Farmhouse; 53.15532°N 1.67605°W		18th century	The farmhouse is in gritstone with quoins and a tile roof. There are two storeys and three bays. The doorway has a massive quoined surround, and the windows are mullioned. At the west end is a single-bay former open-fronted cart shed.
Homestead Farmhouse and Homestead Cottage; 53.14535°N 1.66818°W		18th century	A farmhouse and cottage under one roof in gritstone, with quoins, coved eaves, and a Welsh slate roof with coped gables and moulded kneelers. There are two storeys and attics, and three bays. On the front are two doorways with quoined surrounds and massive lintels, the left doorway also with a segmental hood. The windows either have single lights, or two lights with mullions.
Homelea Cottage and The Cottage; 53.14502°N 1.66826°W	—	18th century	A house, later two cottages, in gritstone with a tile roof, coped gables and moulded kneelers to the north. There are two storeys, two bays, and a lean-to extension on the north. The doorway has chamfered quoins and a lintel, and the windows are mullioned.
Red Lion Cottage; 53.14509°N 1.66838°W		18th century	A house in gritstone with quoins, a chamfered eaves band, and a stone slate roof with coped gables and moulded kneelers. There are two storeys and two bays, with an added bay to the south. On the front are two doorways, one with a massive surround, and the other with a quoined surround, and the windows are sashes.
The Hurst; 53.14515°N 1.66894°W	—	18th century	A pair of cottages later combined into a house, in gritstone with a Welsh slate roof, two storeys and two bays. The central doorway, which has been converted into a window, has a massive quoined surround, and most of the windows are mullioned.
Elton Hall; 53.14496°N 1.66632°W		1668	The house, which was extended in 1715, and which was used for some time as a youth hostel, is in gritstone with quoins, and a roof of Welsh slate and tile. The house has a T-shaped plan, with a main range of two storeys and attics, and three bays, with the earlier lower wing of two storeys projecting towards the street, and a modern single-storey extension. The main doorway on the north front has a moulded architrave and a segmental hood. On the south front, the windows are mullioned, and there is a stair window, above which is a semicircular-headed inscribed and dated tablet. In the earlier range is a former doorway with a dated lintel.
Outbuilding, Dale Head Farm; 53.14917°N 1.68507°W		Late 18th century	The outbuilding, later converted into a house, is in gritstone with quoins, and a Welsh slate roof with a coped southwest gable. There are two storeys and two bays. The doorway has a massive quoined surround, and the windows are single-light replacements.
Cottage adjoining Homestead Farm Cottage; 53.14529°N 1.66791°W	—	Late 18th century	The cottage is in gritstone with quoins and a Welsh slate roof. There are two storeys and two bays, containing a central porch and casement windows. To the right is a lower two-storey range with a coped gable, containing a doorway with a massive lintel and a hood mould, converted into a window. Beyond that is a single-story range of outbuildings with a tile roof.
All Saints' Church; 53.14558°N 1.66978°W		1812	The church is built in gritstone with a Welsh slate roof. It consists of a nave, a south porch, a chancel, a north vestry, and a west tower. The tower has three stages, string courses, a south doorway, clock faces, and an embattled parapet with crocketed pinnacles.
Dale End Farmhouse; 53.14923°N 1.68497°W	—	Early 19th century	The farmhouse is in gritstone with quoins, and a slate roof with coped gables. There are two storeys, and a T-shaped plan, with a range of three bays, and a lower rear wing. The central doorway has a massive quoined surround and a shallow fanlight, and the windows are sashes.
Farmhouse south of Dale End Farmhouse; 53.14886°N 1.68507°W		Early 19th century	A gritstone farmhouse that has a tile roof with coped gables. There are two storeys, two bays, and an irregular double-pile wing at the rear. The central doorway has a quoined surround, and the windows are sashes.
Duke of York Inn; 53.14519°N 1.66993°W		19th century	The public house is in gritstone, and has a tile roof with coped gables. There are two storeys, a symmetrical front of three bays, a rear wing, and a lean-to in the angle. The central doorway has a semicircular fanlight and a canopy on moulded brackets. The windows are a mix of sashes and casements.
Stables, Duke of York Inn; 53.14523°N 1.67012°W		Mid 19th century	The stables to the west of the public house are in gritstone, with rusticated quoins, a Welsh slate roof with coped gables, and a single storey with overlofts. The building contains two doorways with quoined surrounds, massive tooled lintels, and stone hoods. At the north end is a tall wagon doorway with a cambered lintel.
