= Newman Arms =

Historic public house in London, England

The Newman Arms
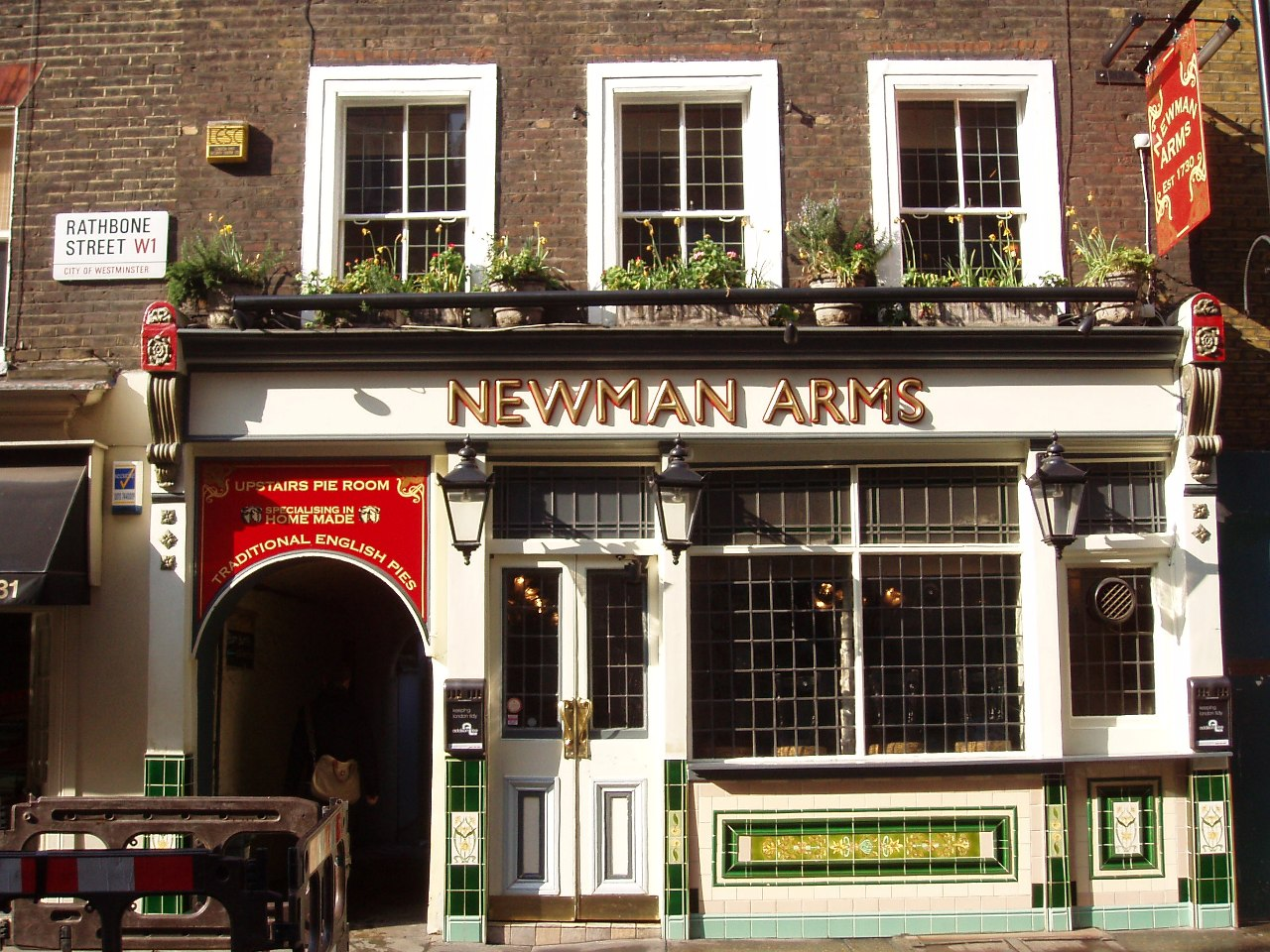
- The Newman Arms

- Location within City of Westminster Location within Greater London

General information
- Location: 23 Rathbone Street, Fitzrovia, London, England
- Coordinates: 51.518124°N 0.135326°W

The Newman Arms is a public house and restaurant at 23 Rathbone Street, Fitzrovia, London, W1. The pub dates back to 1730, and was once a brothel.

== Literary appearances ==
The Newman Arms appears in George Orwell's novel Nineteen Eighty-Four where it was the model for the "Proles" pub. It featured again in his Keep the Aspidistra Flying, and in Michael Powell's film Peeping Tom.

== History ==
In 2012, the pub held a mediation meeting with Westminster City Council to address customer congestion on the pavement outside. The landlady's joke suggestion to serve drinks more slowly was taken at face value by the council, who agreed that serving staff should ensure that each transaction was complete before starting a new one, as part of an agreement to the pub retaining its licence.

In 2017 the pub closed, and it was reopened by Truman's Brewery in 2018, the first pub that Truman's had opened since being re-founded in 2010. The menu reflects the food offering of previous landlord, Tracey Bird, with a focus on pies.

The building has an unofficial blue plaque in honour of the former landlord: "Joe Jenkins, ex-proprietor, poet, bon viveur and Old Git, regularly swore at everybody on these premises". A prostitute in historical costume is painted onto a bricked-over upstairs window in reference to the building's history as a brothel.
