= The Marquis of Granby =

Pub in London

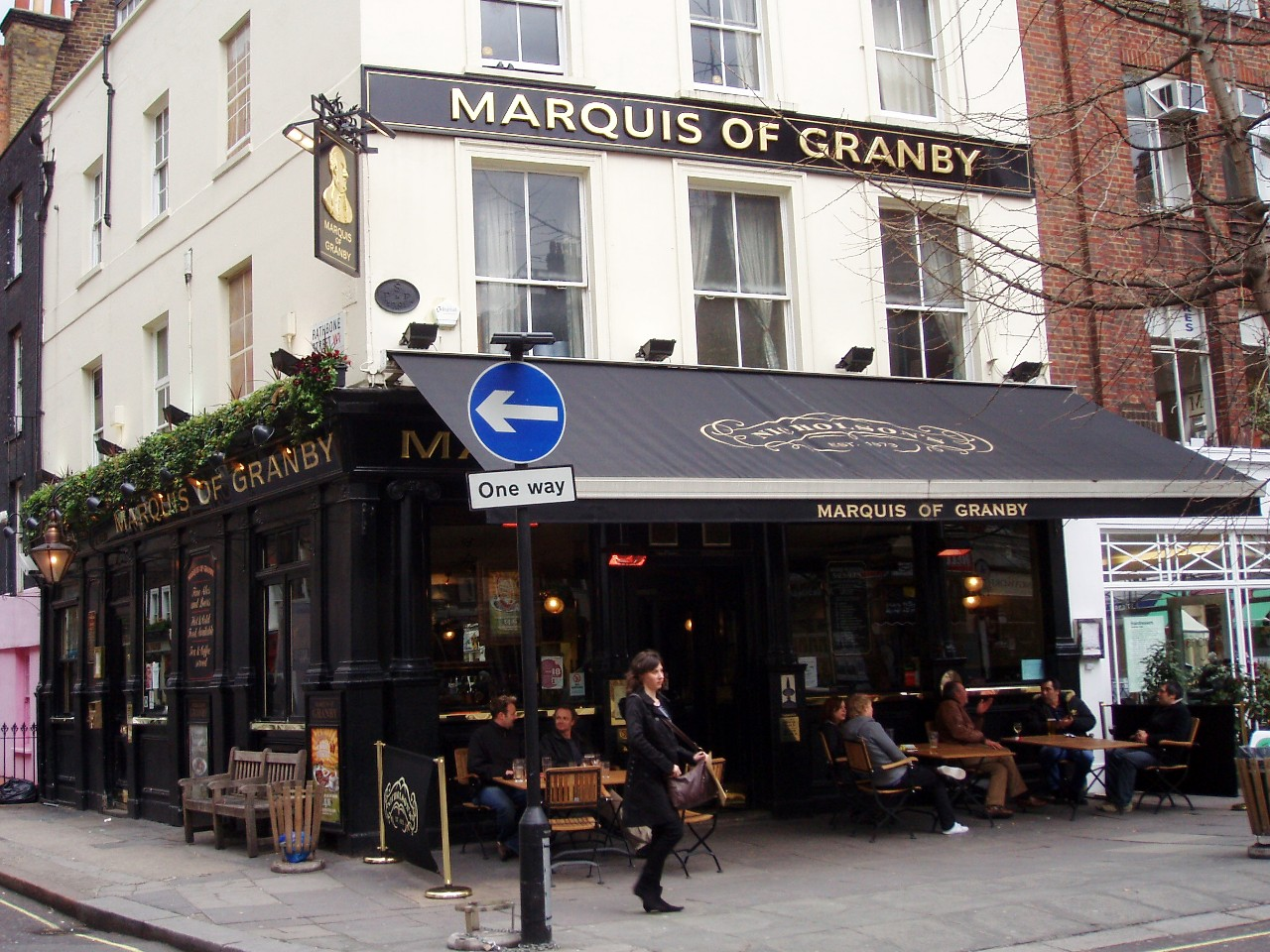
- The Marquis of Granby

- Location within City of Westminster Location within Greater London
- Etymology: From John Manners, Marquess of Granby

General information
- Location: 2 Rathbone Street, Fitzrovia, London, England
- Coordinates: 51.518059°N 0.134680°W

The Marquis of Granby is a public house at 2 Rathbone Street, Fitzrovia, London, W1. The pub is named after John Manners, Marquess of Granby. He is popularly supposed to have more pubs named after him than any other person – due, it is said, to his practice of setting up old soldiers of his regiment as publicans when they were too old to serve.

The poet and playwright T. S. Eliot is associated with the pub. According to Time Out, the poet Dylan Thomas was a regular visitor, who frequented the pub to meet guardsmen who were cruising for gay partners, and then start fights with them.

A pub of the name in Dorking appears in Chapter XXVII of The Pickwick Papers (1836) by Charles Dickens.

== See also ==
- Pub names
