= Baron Killyleagh =

Barony in the Peerage of the United Kingdom

Barony of Killyleagh
- Creation date: 23 June 1986
- Creation: First
- Created by: Elizabeth II
- Peerage: Peerage of the United Kingdom
- Present holder: Andrew Mountbatten-Windsor (not using title)
- Remainder to: the 1st Baron's heirs male of the body lawfully begotten
- Status: Extant, not in use

Baron Killyleagh is a title in the Peerage of the United Kingdom. It was created on 23 July 1986 by Queen Elizabeth II as a substantive title for her son, the then Prince Andrew (now known as Andrew Mountbatten-Windsor) on the occasion of his marriage to Sarah Ferguson. In November 2025, King Charles III removed Andrew Mountbatten-Windsor's right to be referred to as Prince and to use his titles of nobility. Nonetheless, the title 'Baron Killyleagh' along with Mountbatten-Windsor's superior titles (Duke of York and Earl of Inverness) remain extant in strict legal terms.

The title is named after the village and civil parish of Killyleagh, County Down, Northern Ireland. It is best known for its 12th century Killyleagh Castle.

Traditionally, the monarch grants male members of the royal family at least one title on their wedding day. On the same day, that the then Prince Andrew was awarded the title, he was also created Duke of York and Earl of Inverness.

== Award of the title Baron Killyleagh (1986) ==
| Baron | Portrait | Birth | Marriage(s) | Death |
|---|---|---|---|---|
| Andrew Mountbatten-Windsor; House of Windsor; 1986–present also: Duke of York and Earl of Inverness (1986) | | 19 February 1960; Buckingham Palace son of Elizabeth II and Prince Philip, Duke of Edinburgh | Sarah Ferguson; 23 July 1986 – 30 May 1996 (divorce); 2 children | – now 66 years, 275 days old |
On 30 October 2025, the title "Baron Killyleagh" was removed from the Roll of the Peerage, removing Andrew Mountbatten-Windsor's right to use the title.
