= Rathbone Street =

Street in London

Coordinates: 51°31′5.8″N 0°8′6.87″W

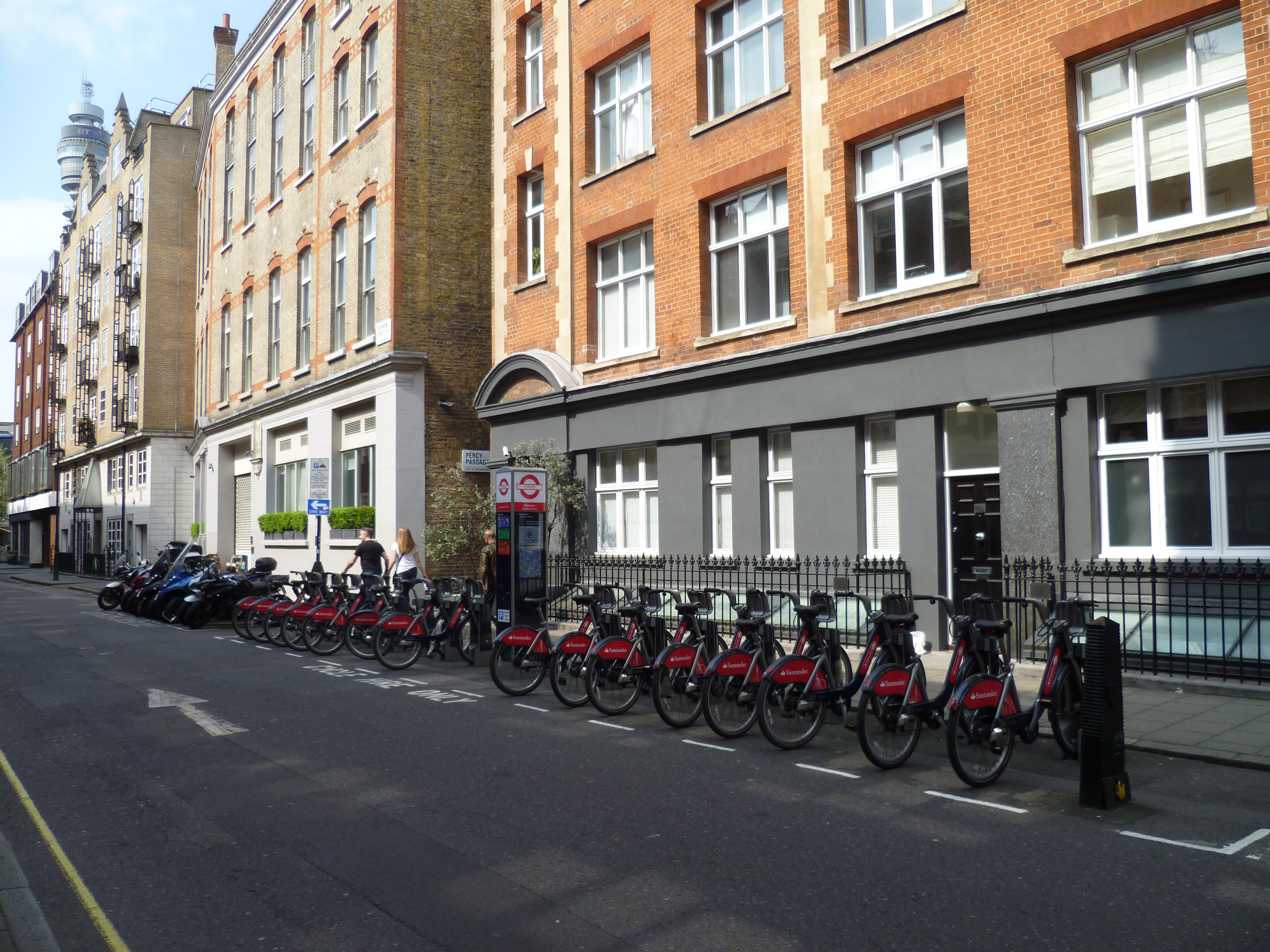
Rathbone Street cycle hire rack

Rathbone Street is a street in London that runs between Charlotte Street in the north and the junction of Rathbone Place and Percy Street in the south. The street is partly in the London Borough of Camden (northern side) and partly in the City of Westminster.

In the north, the pedestrianised Charlotte Place (formerly Little Charlotte Street) joins the street to Goodge Street. Rathbone Street is additionally joined to Charlotte Street by Percy Passage, an alleyway halfway down the street. On the west side of the street a passage next to the Newman Arms links Rathbone Street to Newman Passage.

Another Rathbone Street is in Canning Town in east London.

== History ==
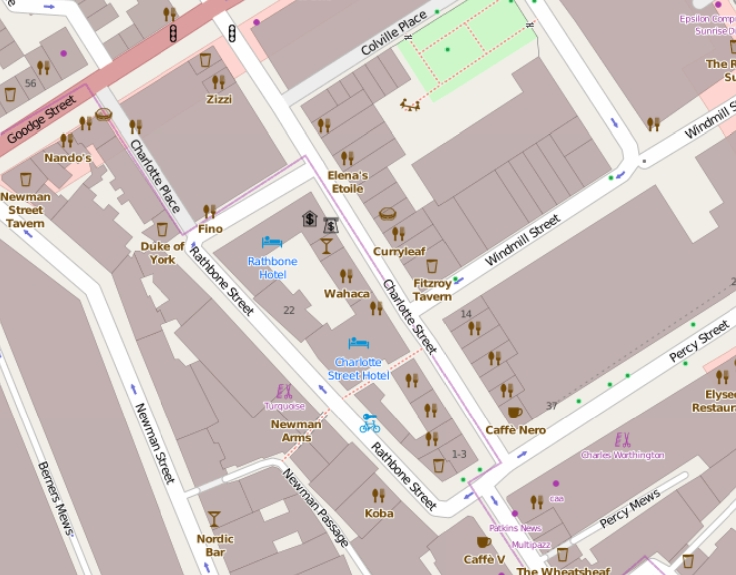
The immediate vicinity of Rathbone Street.

The street was originally known as Glanville Street, then Upper Rathbone Place before assuming its current name. The section in the north from Charlotte Place to Charlotte Street was originally known as Bennett Street or Court, but the name is no longer in use and it is now part of Rathbone Street.

== Pubs ==
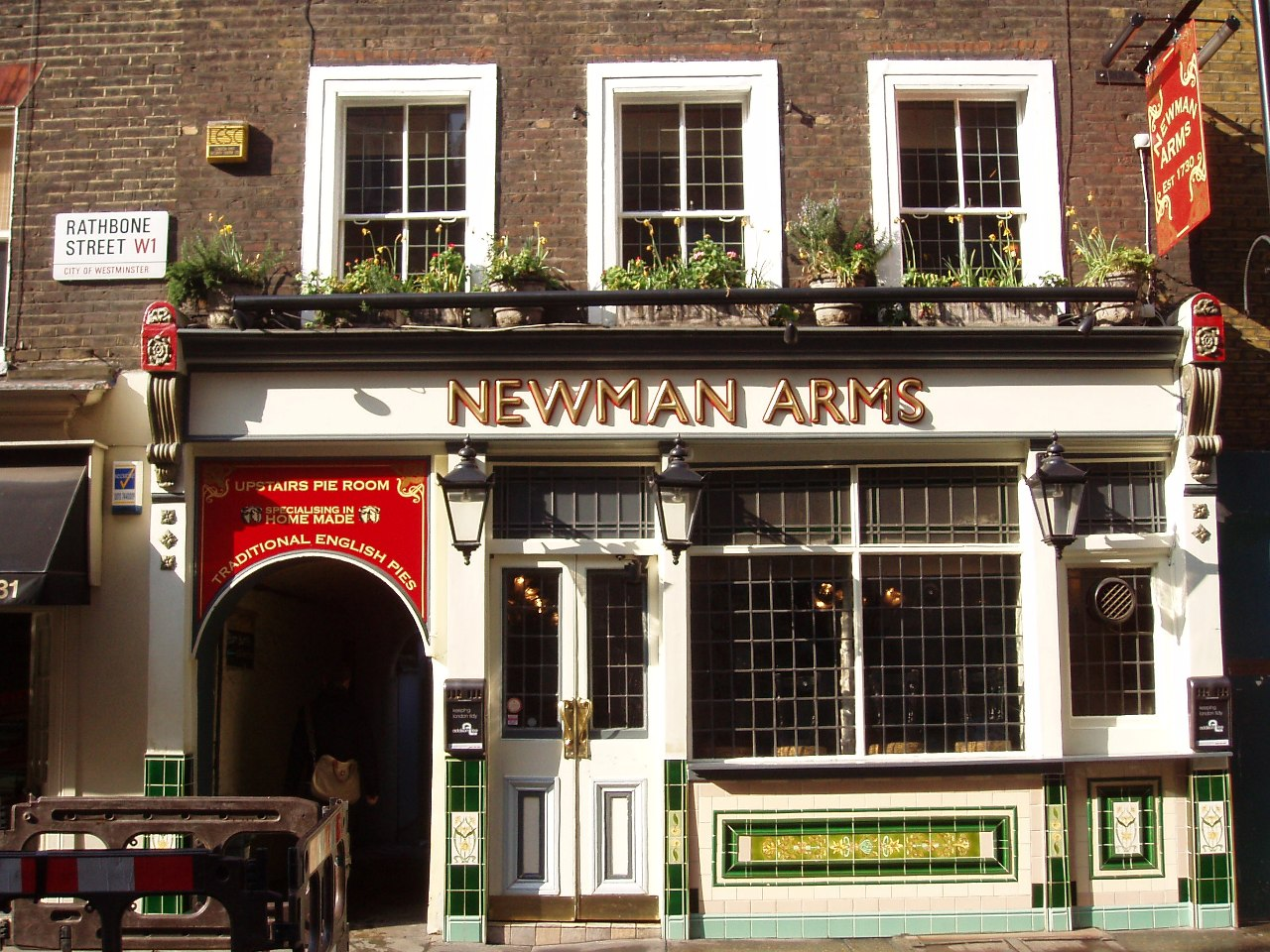
The Newman Arms public house, showing on the left the passage that links Rathbone Street to Newman Passage.

The Marquis of Granby public house is at number 2.

The Newman Arms is at number 23, and was once a brothel. It featured in George Orwell's novels Nineteen Eighty-Four and Keep the Aspidistra Flying as well as in Michael Powell's film Peeping Tom.

The Duke of York is at 47 in the north of the street on the corner with Charlotte Place and bears a date of 1791.
