= Elton, Derbyshire =

Village in Derbyshire, England

Coordinates: 53.145°N 1.670°W

Elton
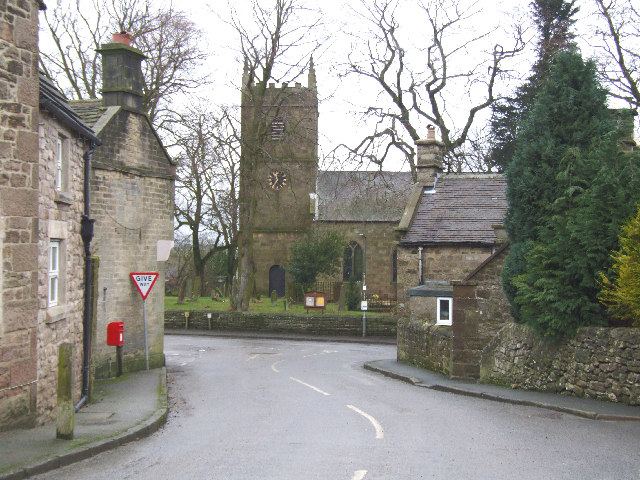
- Elton village and All Saints' Church, Elton

- Location within Derbyshire
- Population: 397 (Parish, 2011)
- OS grid reference: SK221609
- District: Derbyshire Dales
- Shire county: Derbyshire
- Region: East Midlands
- Country: England
- Sovereign state: United Kingdom
- Post town: Matlock
- Postcode district: DE4
- Dialling code: 01629
- Police: Derbyshire
- Fire: Derbyshire
- Ambulance: East Midlands
- UK Parliament: Derbyshire Dales

Elton is a village and civil parish in the Derbyshire Dales district of Derbyshire, England, and lies within the Peak District. Its nearest towns are Bakewell and Matlock.

Elton is on a hillside overlooking a rock formation known as Robin Hood's Stride. It lies on the division between gritstone and limestone countryside and there are examples of buildings and walls constructed with both types of stone in the village. It is a popular destination for cyclists and tourists.

== History ==
The area used to be known for lead mining. An Iron Age fort, Castle Ring, is near the village. Elton was mentioned in the Domesday Book in 1086 when it was owned by Henry de Ferrers.

== Geography ==
Elton is on a hillside overlooking a rock formation known as Robin Hood's Stride. It lies on the division between gritstone and limestone countryside and there are examples of buildings and walls constructed with both types of stone in the village. The nearest towns are Bakewell and Matlock.

At 271 metres (889 ft) above sea level, Elton is less sheltered from the wind than settlements at lower elevation, and it therefore has a reputation for being cold. The highest point on Elton Moor, known as Blake Low, is 330 metres (1,080 ft) above sea level; at this location is Elton Common trig point (TP3057). There is an interpretation board here that explains how the landscape has changed from the past mining activities and points out the effects on a scarred adjacent field. It shows notable points of the Peak District that can be seen from this viewpoint, including Kinder Scout and Mam Tor, some distance away. It states how this is one of the best viewpoints of the Peak District.

== Sport ==
Elton has a playing field that doubles up as a football field for the football season and a cricket field for the cricket season. Elton Cricket Club has a policy that only villagers may join the team. In recent times the team have finished twice runners up in the Longstone League and Orme Shield. After new management in 2006 Elton Football Club rose from division 8 to division 4 of the Chesterfield Sunday League, winning the division 7 title in 2008 and the Hutson Cup in 2007. The 2008–09 season produced a Derbyshire Junior Cup semi-final appearance.

== Transport ==
Hulleys of Baslow provide a bus service (route 172), linking Elton and the surrounding villages to the towns of Bakewell and Matlock. There are a total of 9 journeys to Matlock and 8 to Bakewell (Monday–Saturday). The village has seen an improvement to daytime services, generally at hourly intervals, although in recent years, council-funded evening and bank holiday services have been completely withdrawn. There has been no Sunday service for many years.

== Tourism ==
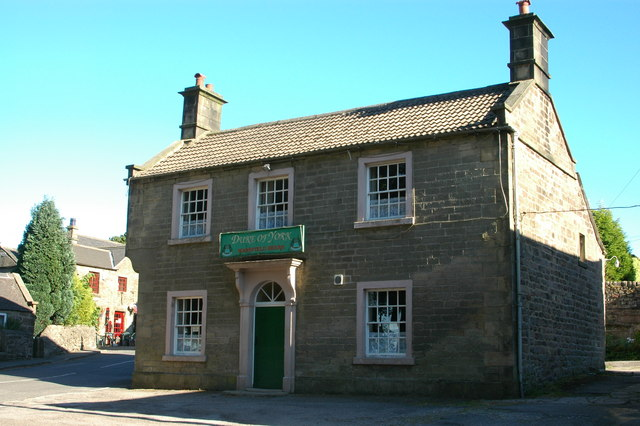
The Duke of York Inn

The Limestone Way, a long-distance ancient trade route which lies just to the east of the village, and the many footpaths leading to and from Elton make it a popular place for hikers. Elton also attracts a large number of cyclists, particularly at the weekends, with events regularly routed through the village.

The 19th-century Duke of York is a Grade II listed public house. The unchanged interior from the 1940s makes the "Duke", as it known locally, a tourist attraction in its own right. It is on the Campaign for Real Ale's National Inventory of Historic Pub Interiors.

== Education ==
Elton Church of England Primary School was built in Victorian times. It usually has no more than thirty students. Over recent years the interior has been refurbished with modern equipment and furniture. At the end of primary school life, most students will move to Highfields School in Matlock, or sometimes Lady Manners School in Bakewell.

The school has recently undergone extension into the old School House next door.

== Amenities ==
There are no shops in the village (the nearest is in Winster, 1.2 miles (1.9 km)) but Elton has a small post office, church, school, village hall and a sports field.

== See also ==
- Listed buildings in Elton, Derbyshire
