= Upper Helmsley =

Village and civil parish in North Yorkshire, England

Coordinates: 54.00414°N 0.94106°W

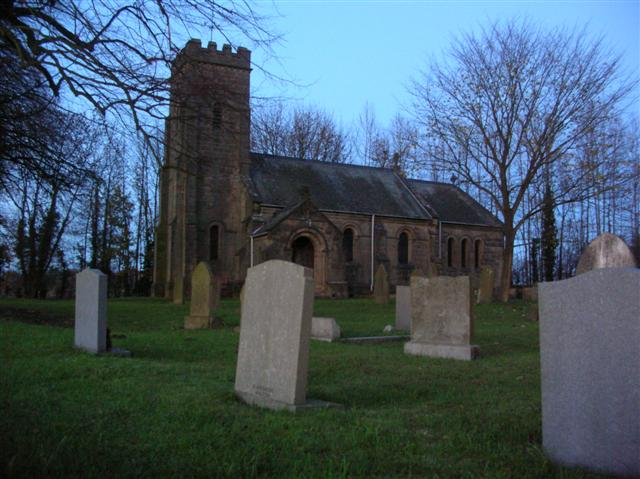
- St Peter's Church, Upper Helmsley

- Location within North Yorkshire
- OS grid reference: SE695056
- Unitary authority: North Yorkshire
- Ceremonial county: North Yorkshire
- Region: Yorkshire and the Humber
- Country: England
- Sovereign state: United Kingdom
- Post town: YORK
- Postcode district: YO41
- Police: North Yorkshire
- Fire: North Yorkshire
- Ambulance: Yorkshire
- UK Parliament: Thirsk and Malton

Upper Helmsley is a village and civil parish in North Yorkshire, England, about seven miles east of York. The population taken at the 2011 Census was less than 100. Details are included in the civil parish of Gate Helmsley.

== History ==
The name Helmsley derives from the Old English Hemelesēg meaning 'Hemele's island'.

The village is mentioned in the Domesday Book as Hamelsec in the Bulford hundred and as a possession of Ligulf. After the Norman invasion the land was granted to Count Robert of Mortain who made Nigel Fossard the local lord of the manor.

== Governance ==
The village lies within the Thirsk and Malton UK Parliament constituency. From 1974 to 2023 it was part of the district of Ryedale, it is now administered by the unitary North Yorkshire Council.

== Geography ==
The 1881 UK Census recorded the population as 71.

The nearest settlements are Gate Helmsley 0.9 miles (1.4 km) to the south; Warthill 1.63 miles (2.62 km) to the south west; Sand Hutton 1 mile (1.6 km) to the north and Stamford Bridge 1.5 miles (2.4 km) to the south east.

== Religion ==
There is a church in the village dedicated to St Peter, rebuilt in 1888.

== See also ==
- Listed buildings in Upper Helmsley
