= HMS Duke of York (1763) =

Cutter of the Royal Navy

History

Great Britain
- Name: Duke of York
- Namesake: Duke of York
- Ordered: 1760
- Launched: 1763
- Commissioned: 1763
- Decommissioned: 1766
- In service: 1763–1766
- Out of service: 1766
- Stricken: 1766
- Fate: Sold 1766

General characteristics
- Class & type: Gaff cutter
- Length: 40 ft 6 in (12.3 m) (upper deck); 31 ft 9.75 in (9.7 m) (keel)
- Beam: 18 ft (5.5 m)
- Draught: 7 ft 4 in (2.2 m)
- Installed power: sail
- Complement: 24
- Armament: 4 × 3 pounder guns, 8 falconets

HMS Duke of York was a British 4-gun cutter and first Royal Navy ship named after the Duke of York.

The ship was purchased by the Navy for £370 on 16 March 1763 and fitted out at Woolwich on 3 April (additional cost of £410 1s 10d). The vessel Entered service in April of the same year under command of Lieutenant Thomas Montagu and assigned to the Thames Estuary.

In June 1766 it was withdrawn to the reserve and on 1 July 1766 the British Admiralty sold it for £40.
