= Listed buildings in Upper Helmsley =

Upper Helmsley is a civil parish in the county of North Yorkshire, England. It contains two listed buildings that are recorded in the National Heritage List for England. Both the listed buildings are designated at Grade II, the lowest of the three grades, which is applied to "buildings of national importance and special interest". The parish contains the village of Upper Helmsley and the surrounding countryside, and both the listed buildings are farmhouses.

== Buildings ==
Name and location	Photograph	Date	Notes
Home Farmhouse; 54.00235°N 0.94139°W		Late 18th century	The farmhouse is in brick, with a floor band, a dentilled eaves course, and a French tile roof. There are two storeys, three bays and a rear cross-wing. On the front is a porch and horizontally sliding sash windows. All the windows have cambered arches in ornamental red and blue brickwork.
Grange Farmhouse; 53.99697°N 0.92741°W		Late 18th to early 19th century	The farmhouse is in brick, with a floor band, a dentilled eaves course, and a pantile roof with raised and tumbled-in gable ends. There are two storeys and three bays. On the front is a doorway, above it is a blocked window, and the other windows are sashes. All the openings have segmental brick arches.
