= St Mary's Church, Gate Helmsley =

Church in North Yorkshire, England

Coordinates: 53.9884°N 0.9481°W

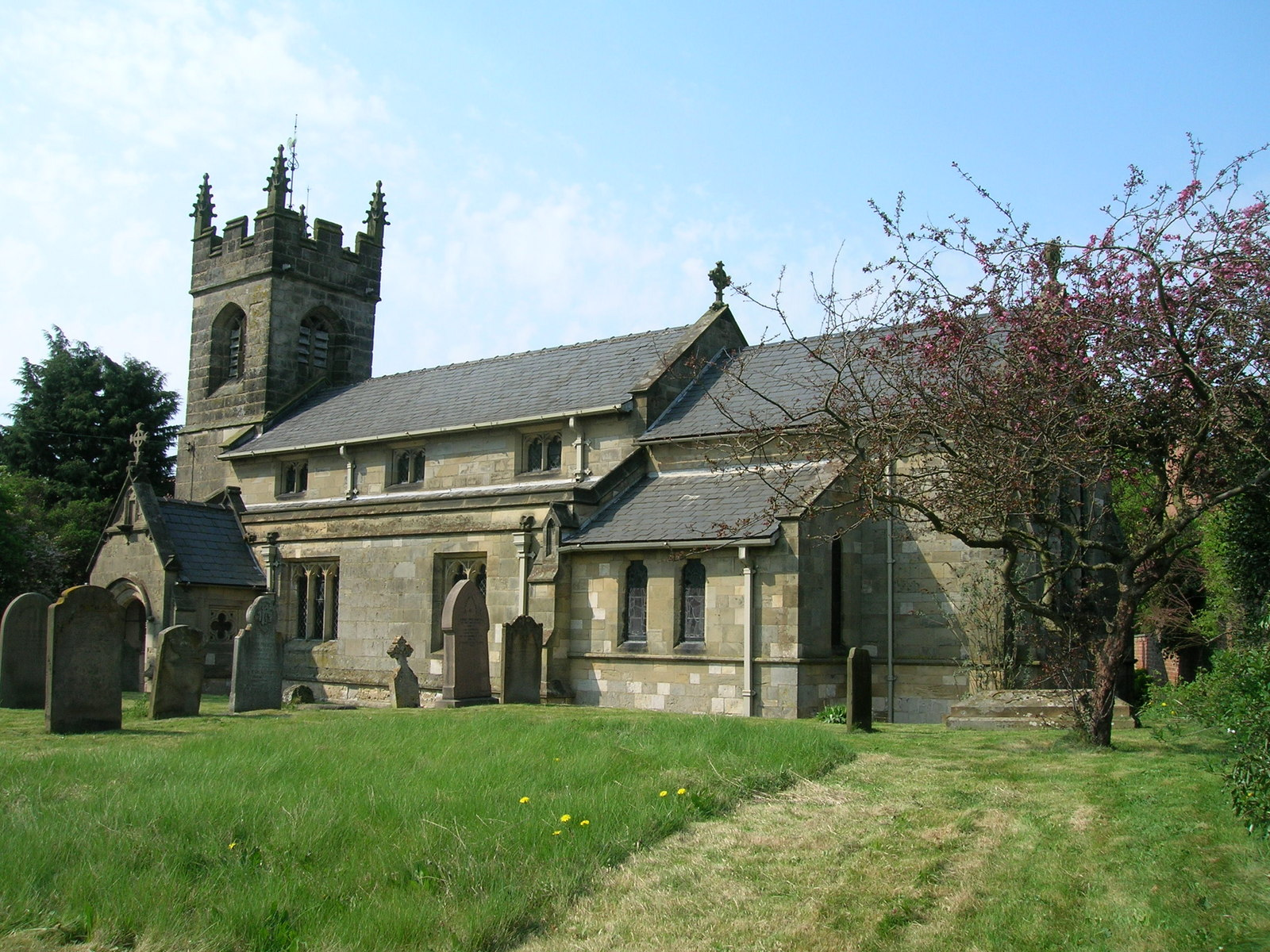
The church from the south-east, in 2011

St Mary's Church is the parish church of Gate Helmsley, a village east of York and west of Stamford Bridge, in North Yorkshire.

The oldest parts of the church date from the 13th century, while the west tower was added in the 15th century. It was heavily restored from 1885 to 1886, with a new chancel added, and the eastern half of the nave rebuilt. Stained glass was added between 1890 and 1910, designed by Ward and Hughes. The church was Grade II* listed in 1953.

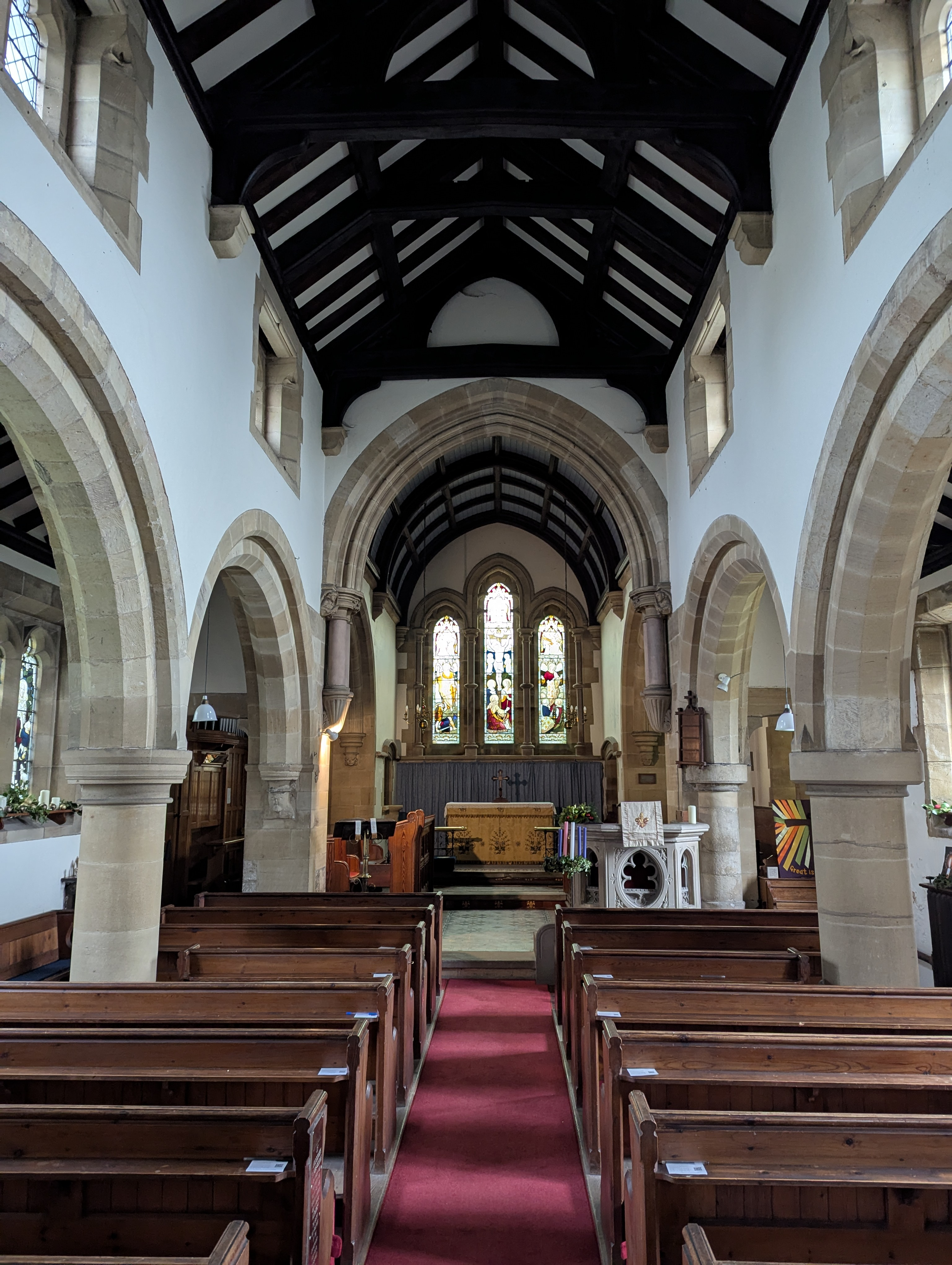
View from the nave into the chancel

The church is built of sandstone, with a Welsh slate roof. It has a three-bay nave and a two-bay chancel, with a south aisle and north chapel. At the west end is a three-stage tower, which includes a three-light Perpendicular window in the second stage, two windows in the belfry, and a battlement. Most of the windows in the body of the church are 19th century, although there is a moved 13th century lancet window in the north chapel. In the porch is a 12th-century capital, which has been reused as a stoup. The font is 13th century and has an octagonal bowl. There are three bells, cast by John Warner in 1889, and the organ was designed by Abbott and Smith in 1913.

== See also ==
- Grade II* listed churches in North Yorkshire (district)
- Listed buildings in Gate Helmsley
