= Duke of York, Leysters =

Pub in Herefordshire, England

Duke of York
- The pub in 2025

General information
- Type: Public house; originally a farmhouse
- Location: Middleton on the Hill, Herefordshire, England
- Coordinates: 52.267823°N 2.656166°W
- Year built: 17th century

The Duke of York is a public house in the parish of Middleton on the Hill, near Leysters in Herefordshire, England. Housed in a stone-built former farmhouse of probable 17th-century origin, it is noted for its largely unaltered historic interior, which is rated three stars on CAMRA's National Inventory of Historic Pub Interiors and regarded as being of "outstanding national historic importance". The pub has remained in the same family ownership since 1911.

== History ==
The building is a former farmhouse of probable 17th-century origin, constructed in stone and later converted into a public house.

It was included on the Campaign for Real Ale (CAMRA)'s National Inventory of Historic Pub Interiors before the inventory's grading system was revised. Under the revised scheme, it is rated three stars and its interior is regarded as being of "outstanding national historic importance".

The pub has been owned by the same family since 1911. Its centenary was celebrated in 2011 with a series of events and the release of a commemorative bottled beer produced by Hereford Brewery.

== Interior ==
The interior retains a three-room layout that has changed little since the period before the Second World War. The public bar is a small room with a modest serving counter and hatch, while the back bar retains older shelving, including a traditional cash drawer. Around the fireplace is a high-backed curved settle, and the room also contains fixed seating and a historic scoreboard associated with the game of quoits. A separate darts room retains built-in corner seating and a tiled fireplace.

The lounge was brought into use as a public room shortly before the Second World War and has a more domestic character than the rest of the pub. Formerly used as a kitchen and brewhouse, it replaced an earlier range fireplace with the present hearth. The bar fittings in this room are largely post-war in date and include a mirrored back fitting with shelving. The interior also contains various brewing-related artefacts and a longcase clock made by G. Rocke of Kidderminster.
