= Gate Helmsley =

Village and civil parish in North Yorkshire, England

Coordinates: 53.98960°N 0.94445°W

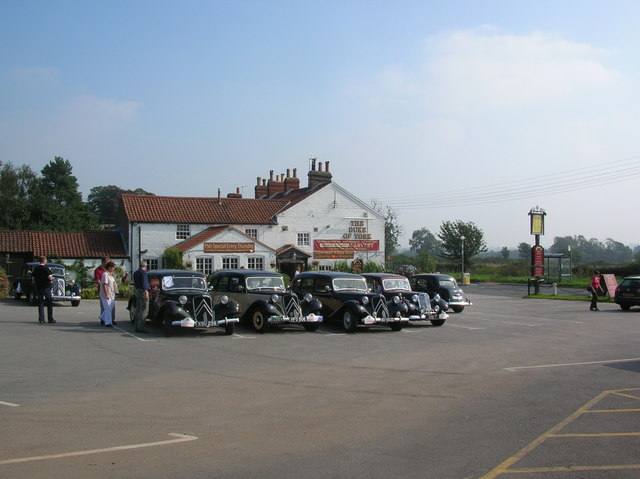
- The Duke of York, Gate Helmsley

- Location within North Yorkshire
- Population: 325 (Including Upper Helmsley. 2011)
- OS grid reference: SE693076
- Unitary authority: North Yorkshire
- Ceremonial county: North Yorkshire
- Region: Yorkshire and the Humber
- Country: England
- Sovereign state: United Kingdom
- Post town: YORK
- Postcode district: YO41
- Police: North Yorkshire
- Fire: North Yorkshire
- Ambulance: Yorkshire
- UK Parliament: Thirsk and Malton

Gate Helmsley is a village and civil parish in North Yorkshire, England, about seven miles east of York. The village lies on the border with the East Riding of Yorkshire.

== History ==
The name Helmsley derives from the Old English Hemelesēg meaning 'Hemele's island'. 'Gate' refers to the village's position on the Roman road from York to Malton.

The village is mentioned in the Domesday Book as Hamelsec in the Bulford hundred and as a possession of the Archbishop of York.

Gate Helmsley was served by Holtby railway station on the York to Beverley Line between 1847 and 1939.

== Governance ==
The village lies within the Thirsk and Malton UK Parliament constituency. It also lies within the Sheriff Hutton & Derwent electoral ward of North Yorkshire Council.

From 1974 to 2023 the village was part of the Ryedale district.

== Geography ==
The 1881 UK Census recorded the population as 204. According to the 2001 UK Census the population was 291, of which 207 were over the age of sixteen and of those, 127 were in employment. There were 104 dwellings, of which 54 were detached. By the time of the 2011 census the population had increased to 325.

The nearest settlements are Upper Helmsley 0.9 miles (1.4 km) to the north; Warthill 1.1 miles (1.8 km) to the west; Low Catton 1.1 miles (1.8 km) to the south-east and Stamford Bridge 1.3 miles (2.1 km) to the east. The village stands alongside the A166 that forms part of the boundary between North Yorkshire and the East Riding of Yorkshire. The road used to be a turnpike. The village has an elevation of 100 feet (30 m) at its highest point. The soil is sandy on top of beds of Keuper Marls and Bunter Sandstone.

== Religion ==
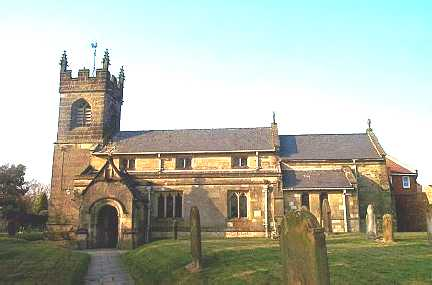
St Mary's Church, Gate Helmsley

St Mary's Church, Gate Helmsley is a Grade II* Listed Building. The small Wesleyan Chapel next to St Mary's Church still stands.

== Notable buildings ==
In addition to the Church of St Mary, there are six other Grade II Listed buildings including the local public house.
