= The Duke of York, Gate Helmsley =

Historic public house in Gate Helmsley, North Yorkshire, England

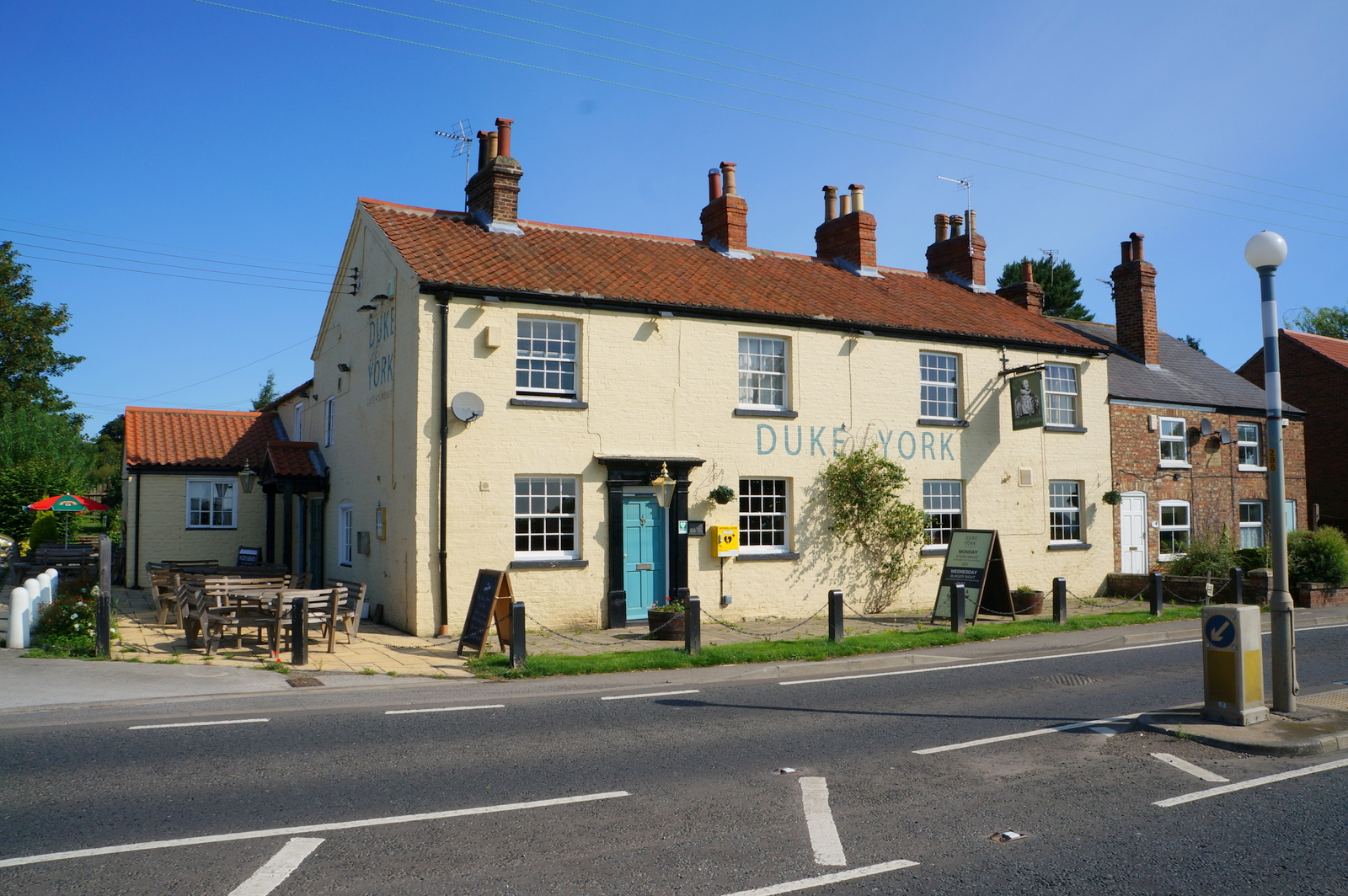
The pub, in 2014

The Duke of York is a historic public house in Gate Helmsley, a village in North Yorkshire, in England.

The pub was built in the mid 19th century, and was altered in the 20th century, work including the replacement of the roof. The building was grade II listed in 1985. In 2016, it was shortlisted in a competition to find Yorkshire's favourite pub; at the time, it was owned by Ainsty Inns. In 2020, the pub closed as a result of the COVID-19 pandemic. It was planned to be refurbished by its owner, Star Pubs, in 2024 subject to them agreeing a lease with a new landlord.

The pub is built of whitewashed brick with a pantile roof. It has two storeys and an L-shaped plan, with a front range of four bays, and a rear wing. The doorway has a Tuscan frame and a dentilled cornice, and the windows are sashes.

== See also ==
- Listed buildings in Gate Helmsley
