= Middleton on the Hill =

Village in Herefordshire, England

Coordinates: 52.277°N 2.673°W

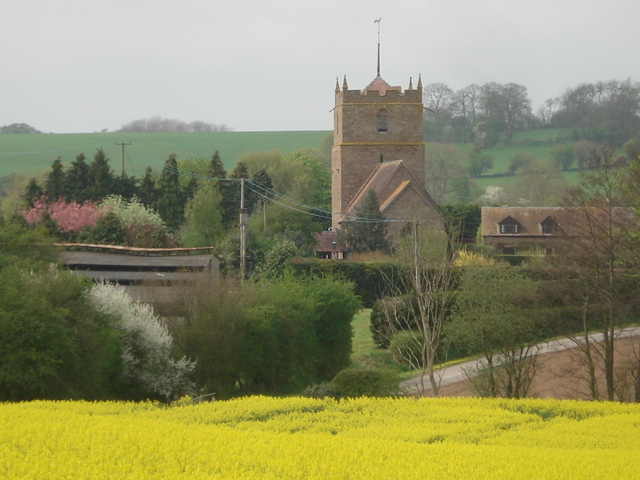
- The tower of St Mary the Virgin

- Location within Herefordshire
- OS grid reference: SO545645
- Civil parish: Middleton-on-the-Hill
- Unitary authority: Herefordshire
- Ceremonial county: Herefordshire
- Region: West Midlands
- Country: England
- Sovereign state: United Kingdom
- Post town: LEOMINSTER
- Postcode district: HR6
- Post town: LUDLOW
- Postcode district: SY8
- Dialling code: 01568
- Police: West Mercia
- Fire: Hereford and Worcester
- Ambulance: West Midlands
- UK Parliament: North Herefordshire

Middleton on the Hill is a village and civil parish in north east Herefordshire, England, near the border with Worcestershire. Middleton-on-the-Hill lies a few miles to the east of the A49 between Ludlow and Leominster. Middleton on the Hill is one of the 53 Thankful Villages in England and Wales that suffered no fatalities during the Great War of 1914 to 1918; as it did not suffer any losses in World War II either, it is one of 13 villages considered "doubly thankful". The village is featured on Darren Hayman's album, Thankful Villages Volume 3.

== Etymology ==
Middleton on the Hill does not mean "middle town or village" (from Old English middel "middle" and tūn "farm, village, estate, enclosure, manor (which gives us the modern English "town") as with most places of the name (e.g. Middleton, Greater Manchester: instead the etymology derives from Old English micel "large (related to modern English much" and tūn "farm, village, estate, enclosure, manor", here in the sense "estate" meaning "large village" (i.e. one that is broad in size). The name was recorded in 1086 in the Domesday Book as Miceltune when it was reported as part of the lands belonging to Leominster "TRE". After 1086 it belonged to Durand, the Sheriff, and was worth ten shillings.

== Buildings ==
Saint Mary's church is in the Norman and Early English styles and has a large tower which contained three bells. This older church had outlived the chapel which was demolished in 1800. In the churchyard is a war memorial that unusually is shaped like a lantern. The inscription reads:

A thank offering to Almighty God
"At evening time it shall be light "
for the safe return of all the men from this parish
who fought in the Great War 1914 - 1918
and 1939 - 1945

In 1874 a school was erected at a cost of £210 that could cater for 42 children. A building stood here was called Moor Abbey and was the remains of a much older building. This building would have had a moat.

A short distance away, about 3 miles (5 km) south east of Middleton and near Tenbury Wells is the church of Saint Michael, which was founded by the Reverend Sir Frederick Arthur Gore Ouseley, Bart, M.A. at an outlay of nearly £30,000. Frederick Ouseley was the musical prodigy son of Sir Gore Ouseley, the diplomat who served in Persia, Russia and India. The church is a magnificent structure of stone, in the Middle Pointed style of architecture, and was consecrated on the 29 September 1856. There is beautiful stained glass in the east and west windows in particular, which represents figures of angels and the Crucifixion. The font is placed in a complete baptistery well of water, and there were only two of its kind when it was installed. The organ, a remarkable instrument that has 64 stops and four manuals, with many other novel and effective features, was installed under the direction of the Rev. Sir Frederick Ouseley.

== Population ==
The village is now primarily home to commuters. Its population in 1861 was 445 and in 1871, 382. In the United Kingdom Census 2001 the Middleton on the Hill ward headcount was recorded as 244.

== Local radio ==
The village is covered by Hits Radio Herefordshire & Worcestershire on 96.7 FM and Hits Radio Birmingham, and Sunshine 855, as well as BBC Hereford and Worcester.
