= All Saints' Church, Elton =

All Saints’ Church, Elton
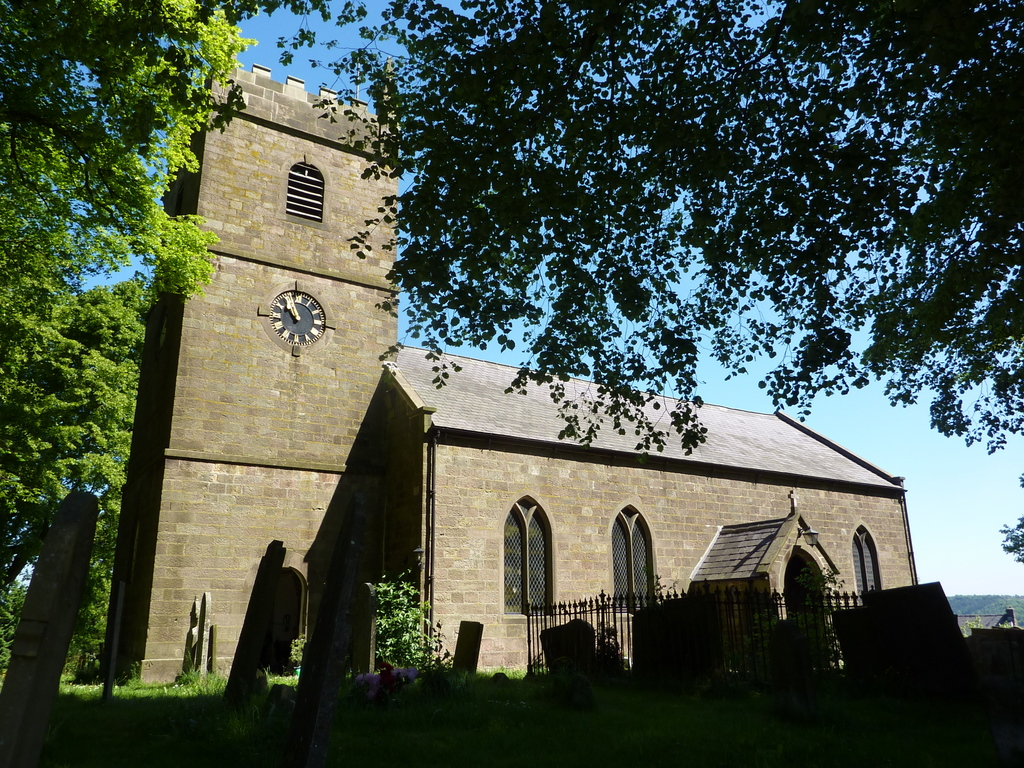
- All Saints’ Church, Elton

- Location within Derbyshire
- 53°8′43.8″N 1°40′10″W
- Location: Elton, Derbyshire
- Country: England
- Denomination: Church of England

History
- Dedication: All Saints

Architecture
- Heritage designation: Grade II listed
- Completed: 1812

Administration
- Diocese: Derby
- Archdeaconry: Derbyshire Peaks and Dales
- Deanery: Carsington
- Parish: All Saints’ Elton

All Saints’ Church, Elton is a Grade II listed Church of England church in Elton, Derbyshire.

== History ==
Elton was originally one of the chapelries of Youlgrave. By the time of the reformation the original church contained three aisles and was dedicated to St Margaret. The spire fell in 1800. Efforts were made to secure funding for rebuilding in 1805, 1808 and 1816. The church was completely rebuilt starting in 1812. The church is built in gritstone with a Welsh slate roof. It consists of a nave, a south porch, a chancel, a north vestry, and a west tower. The tower has three stages, string courses, a south doorway, clock faces, and an embattled parapet with crocketed pinnacles.

== Organ ==
An organ by Gray and Davison was moved here in 1887 from St John the Evangelist Church, Red Lion Square, London but this has been replaced. The replacement is a 1 manual 6 stop instrument by Bevington & Sons dating from ca. 1857 formerly installed in the schoolroom beneath Dagnall Street Baptist Chapel and installed in Elton by Mander in 1953. It was the gift of Mrs H. Johnson.

== Bells ==
The tower now contains a ring of 6 bells.

== Churchyard ==
The churchyard contains memorials to two soldiers.

- Sapper Sydney Aaron Hulley, 200 Field Coy, Royal Engineers, died 6 December 1947 aged 36
- Private H Allison, 3rd Battalion Sherwood Foresters (Notts and Derby Regiment), died 21 November 1916
