= The Duke of York, Fitzrovia =

Pub in Fitzrovia, London

Coordinates: 51°31′7.3″N 0°8′9.4″W

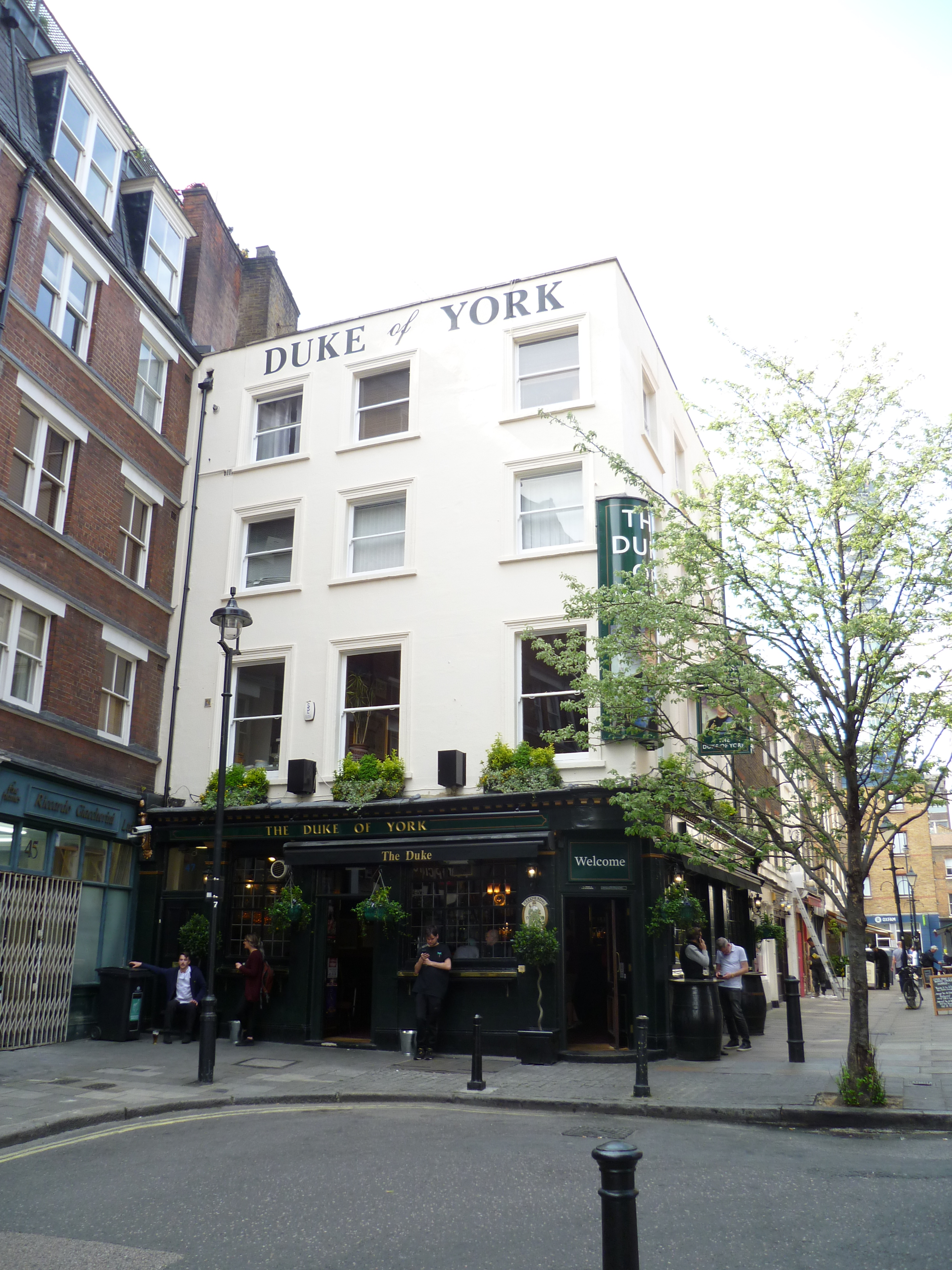
The Duke of York

The Duke of York is a public house at 47 Rathbone Street, Fitzrovia, London, W1. It is located in the north of the street on the corner with Charlotte Place and bears the year 1791.

In 1943 Anthony Burgess and his wife were drinking in the pub when they witnessed it invaded by a "razor gang". It has been speculated that this influenced the content of his later novel A Clockwork Orange.

The current landlords are Debbie Sickelmore and Alan Monks.

In 2012, the pub's licence was reviewed, after it was wrongly accused of failure to control customers outside the pub. The owners won their court case against Westminster council allowing customers to drink outside.

In 2014, Andrew Mountbatten-Windsor (then the Duke of York) gave permission for his image to be used on the new pub sign, making it the only known pub to bear the most recent Duke of York's image on its sign.
