= Duke of York Island =

Duke of York Island may refer to:

- Duke of York Island, Antarctica
- Duke of York Islands, Papua New Guinea
  - Duke of York Island, Papua New Guinea
- Duke of York Island (Chile) (Isla Duque de York)
- Etolin Island, Alaska, was named Duke of York Island until it became American territory with the Alaska Purchase of 1867

== See also ==
- Duke of York Archipelago, Nunavut, Canada
