= Duke of York, Ganwick Corner =

Pub in Ganwick Corner, Hertfordshire, England

Coordinates: 51°40′53″N 0°11′13″W

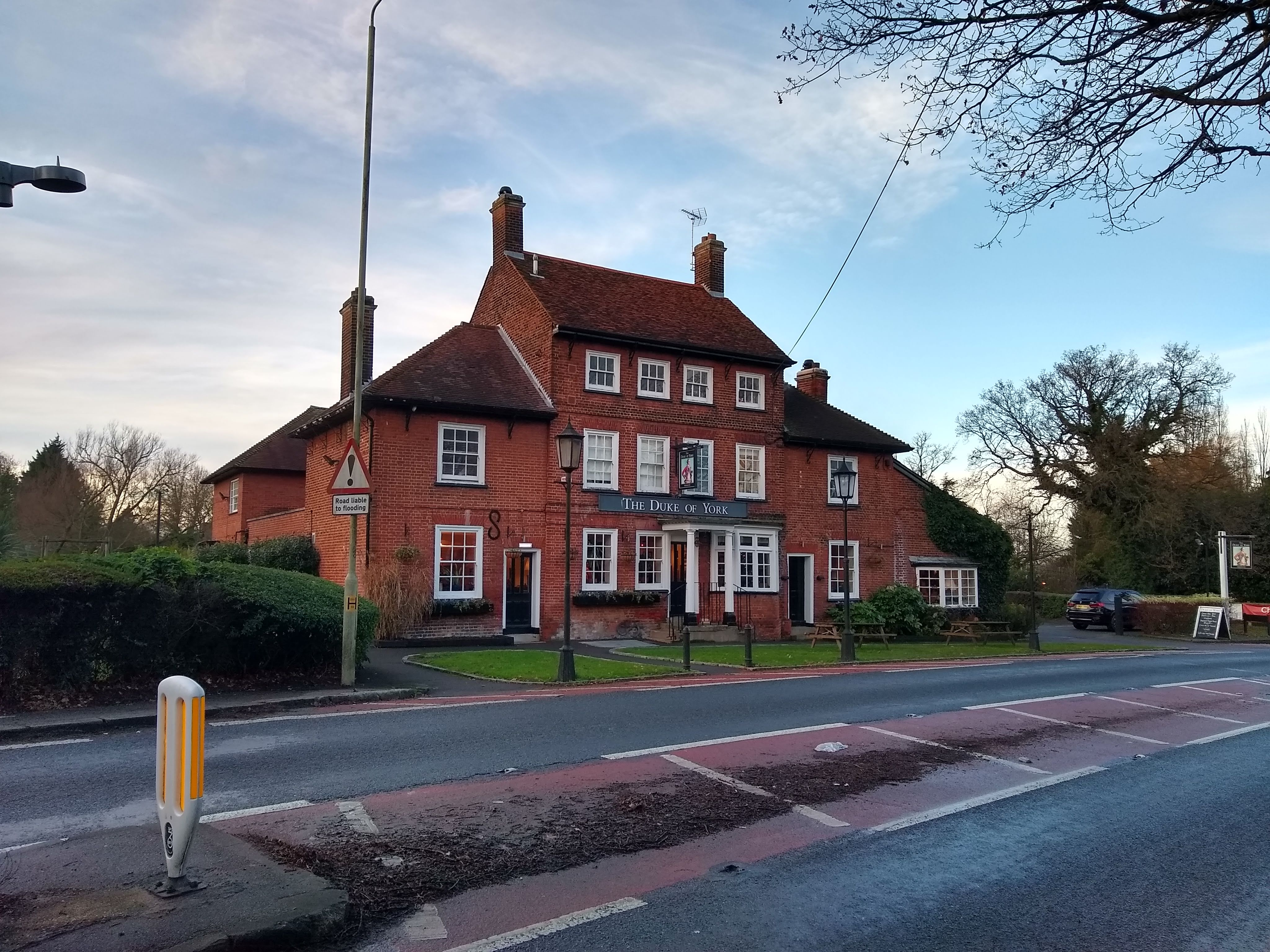
The Duke of York

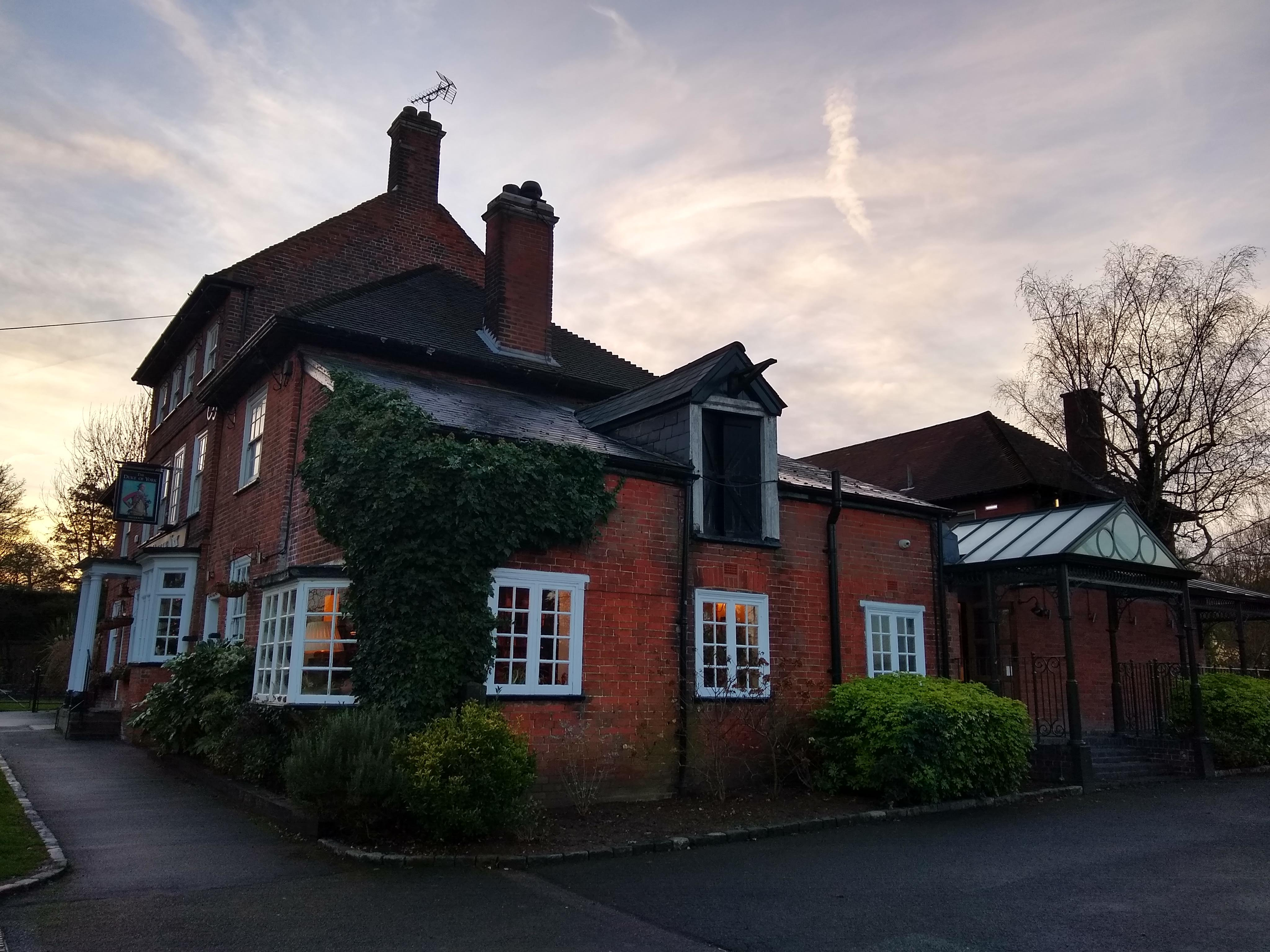
Side view

The Duke of York is a former coaching inn at Ganwick Corner on the section of the Great North Road now known as Barnet Road, between Chipping Barnet and Potters Bar in Hertfordshire, England. It is Grade II listed.

The pub was licensed in 1752.
