= Duke of York, Elton =

Listed pub in Derbyshire, England

Duke of York
- The pub in 2025

General information
- Type: Public house
- Location: Main Street, Elton, Derbyshire, England
- Coordinates: 53°08′43″N 1°40′03″W
- Completed: 19th century
- Renovated: c. 1990 (altered)

Design and construction
- Designations

Listed Building – Grade II
- Official name: Duke of York Inn
- Designated: 14 December 1983
- Reference no.: 1109381

The Duke of York is a Grade II listed public house on Main Street in Elton, Derbyshire, England. Built in the 19th century, it is noted for its largely intact historic interior, which is rated three stars on CAMRA's National Inventory of Historic Pub Interiors and is regarded as being of "outstanding national historic importance". The pub has remained in the same family's ownership since 1968.

== History ==
The building is a public house dating from the 19th century. It has remained in the same family's ownership since 1968, when it was purchased from Offilers, a brewery in Derby.

On 14 December 1983, the Duke of York was designated a Grade II listed building. It was included on the Campaign for Real Ale (CAMRA)'s National Inventory of Historic Pub Interiors before the inventory's grading system was revised. Under the revised scheme, it is rated three stars and its interior is regarded as being "of outstanding national historic importance".

== Architecture ==
=== Exterior ===
The building is constructed of gritstone with stone chimney stacks and roofs covered with a mixture of concrete and stone tiles. Its layout is centred on an entrance leading into a corridor, from which visitors can reach three public rooms, while the former living quarters are situated to the rear. The main frontage is a symmetrical two-storey elevation with three bays and a chamfered corner at one end. A central doorway, topped by a fanlight and sheltered by a stone canopy on decorative brackets, forms the principal entrance. Additional ranges extend to the rear and side of the building, incorporating a variety of sash and casement windows, while a glazed porch marks a secondary entrance.

=== Interior ===
The interior is arranged around a rear tap room and serving area connected to the snug at the front by a serving hatch. A central tiled corridor provides access to the principal rooms and retains timber panelling, partitions and draught lobbies. Much of the historic bar fitting survives, including a panelled counter, glazed screens and shelving, although parts were carefully repositioned during alterations carried out around 1990. The tap room retains fixed seating, a timber-panelled ceiling and a stone fireplace, now fitted with a stove, while evidence of earlier glazed screens also survives. Fixed seating, panelled doors and built-in cupboards remain throughout the interior, and both the snug and an adjoining room preserve their traditional arrangement and character. At the rear, steps lead to a courtyard, while below the building is a stone-vaulted cellar. On the upper floor, a large club room, formerly used by the Oddfellows, can be divided into two sections by a sliding partition.
