= Duke of York Hotel, Toronto =

Heritage building in Toronto, Ontario, Canada

The Duke Toronto
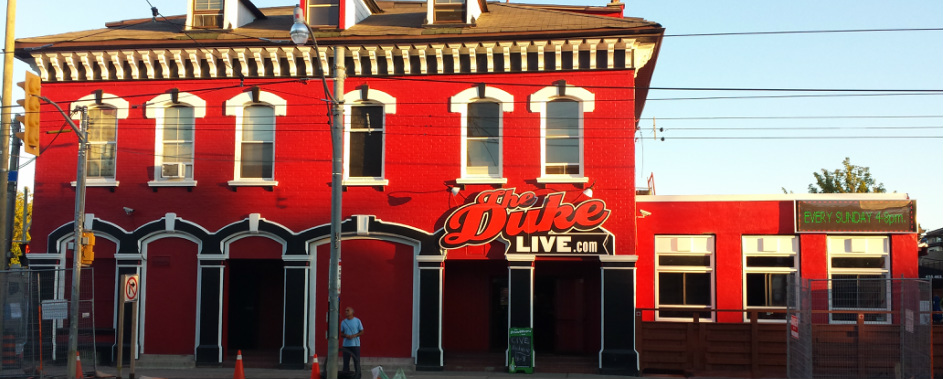
- Current exterior
- Former names: Duke of York Hotel; Morin House

General information
- Location: 1225 Queen Street East, Toronto, Ontario, Canada
- Coordinates: 43.663023145785615°N 79.33034682715417°W
- Inaugurated: 1870

Other information
- Facilities: bar/restaurant with live music and patio, take-out restaurant

Website
- theduketoronto.com

Ontario Heritage Act
- Designated: June 13, 1983

The Duke Toronto, known as the Duke of York Hotel for many years and first known as the Morin House, is a heritage structure in Toronto, Ontario, Canada. It is located at 1225 Queen Street East, at the corner of Queen Street and Leslie Avenue in the Leslieville neighbourhood. It is listed on the City of Toronto's Heritage Registry, added in 1983. It has a restaurant and pub, and a take-out restaurant. The main restaurant has a stage with live music regularly.

== History ==
The building was built by James Morin, a local brickmaker. He built the hotel in 1870 at the intersection of Kingston Road (as that stretch of Queen was known at the time) and Leslie, then the site of a tollgate, and next to the site of his brickmaking business. Next door was another pub, known as "Uncle Tom's Cabin", presumably named after the novel or Ontario site of the same name. However, Morin went bankrupt in 1872, and his hotel and bricklaying business was sold at auction. The brickmaking enterprise and hotel was sold to John Mulvey and John McCracken, who themselves went bankrupt in 1873, and the property was sold again.

The next operator of the hotel was Elias A. Jones, who had had a bus company until street railways came into operation. The hotel had an outbuilding which was used as a stable, this period being prior to automobiles. The hotel was close to the Woodbine Race Track (later Greenwood) and race horses brought from out of town would sometimes stable at the hotel. Jones operated the hotel until his death in 1891.

Richard Stone then took over the hotel, sometimes known as "Stone's Hotel", the property owned by Robert Davies. In 1898, Stone, nicknamed "Tap" Stone, lost his liquor license and was ordered to sell the hotel. Stone appealed and was allowed to keep the hotel, but lost his license again in 1900 and was ordered to sell the hotel within three months. However, he did not lose his license and it was renewed in 1901, with conditions. In 1907, Stone and his wife Jennie separated and disputed ownership of the hotel, which Stone valued at CA$20,000 (equivalent to $618,584 in 2025). Jennie later sued Richard for CA$5,900 (equivalent to $175,701 in 2025) for money she gave to Richard out of an inheritance, used for the hotel.

In 1910, Stone sold the hotel to A.D. Simon for CA$23,000 (equivalent to $655,853 in 2025). Stone renamed the hotel the Duke of York Hotel. Simon operated it for three years, selling it in 1913 to Harry Darby for a reported CA$45,000 (equivalent to $1,239,100 in 2025). The next operators, from 1920 to 1930 were George and Ellen Chisholm, operating during Prohibition until 1926. The hotel was allowed only to sell light beer, termed "Fergie's Foam" after the Ontario premier, during Prohibition. The Chisholms both died in 1930 and the hotel was sold at estate. The hotel reopened in 1933 under the management of Fred Hammer, and owned by an affiliate of the Brewing Corporation of Canada, known as Leslie Properties Limited. In 1935, the ownership of hotels by breweries was outlawed and the hotel's liquor license was suspended. The brewery gave its shares in the Duke of York to its shareholders to evade the ban. Fred Perkins was the owner of the hotel, and operated the Duke Stables until 1950.

George Politis bought the hotel in 1990. The hotel had a damaging fire in 1999 and a fatal shooting outside in 2008. After the 2008 shooting, the John Wayne aka 'Duke' painting on the front of the building depicting Wayne holding a rifle was painted over with a depiction of a musician. The Duke of York was renamed 'The Duke' afterward.

The stables and southern portion of the property were severed from the hotel property and are now a townhouse subdivision.

=== Incidents ===
- 1884 - Peter Norton, denied of a drink due to intoxication, starts a fight with Elias Jones. Jones' wife Eliza intervenes and is hit with a chair by Norton. Norton is convicted of assault and fined CA$30 (equivalent to $1,097 in 2025).
- 1894 - George Hurley receives a sentence of six months in the Central Prison for stealing beer from the Morin House.
- 1902 - Robert Clay attempts to blackmail Richard Stone, sending him a letter demanding money. Stone gives the letter to the police who arrest Clay. He received a sentence of 30 days in jail.
- 1924 - Bartender Thomas McMullen is convicted of selling 'hard liquor' at the hotel during Prohibition and fined CA$200 (equivalent to $3,649 in 2025) and costs.
- 1926 - James Neilly was apprehended selling illegal strong beer to the Duke of York. He was fined CA$600 (equivalent to $10,709 in 2025) or three months in jail.
- 1941 - In a wave of vandalism, cars parked at the Duke of York and several other hotels have their tires slashed.
- 1952 - David Henderson robbed the hotel of CA$600 (equivalent to $6,938 in 2025) at gunpoint and was sentenced to five years of penitentiary.
- 1963 - William Young is robbed of $30 and fatally assaulted in the laneway by the hotel by Harry Wilson, both seen earlier that evening at the hotel. Wilson admitted to robbing the man and leaving him unconscious during freezing temperatures. Wilson was sentenced to be hanged. It was commuted to life imprisonment to be served in Kingston Penitentiary.
- 1970 - Peter Vaughan is fatally injured in the parking lot of the hotel, after falling and hitting his head on a car bumper during a dispute. Helped to his car, he is not found until the morning after ambulance attendants cannot find him.
- 1998 - Paul Coté attempts to set the hotel on fire after being ejected from the hotel.
- 1999 - The hotel was damaged by fire, started in a tenant's room.
- 2008 - A shooting incident between two men outside the bar killed innocent bystander Bailey Zaveda.

== See also ==
- Royal eponyms in Canada

Other surviving taverns and inns in Toronto:

- Lambton House
- Miller Tavern
- Montgomery's Inn
- Spadina Hotel
