= Duke of York, Bloomsbury =

Pub in Bloomsbury, London

Coordinates: 51°31′22″N 0°06′59″W

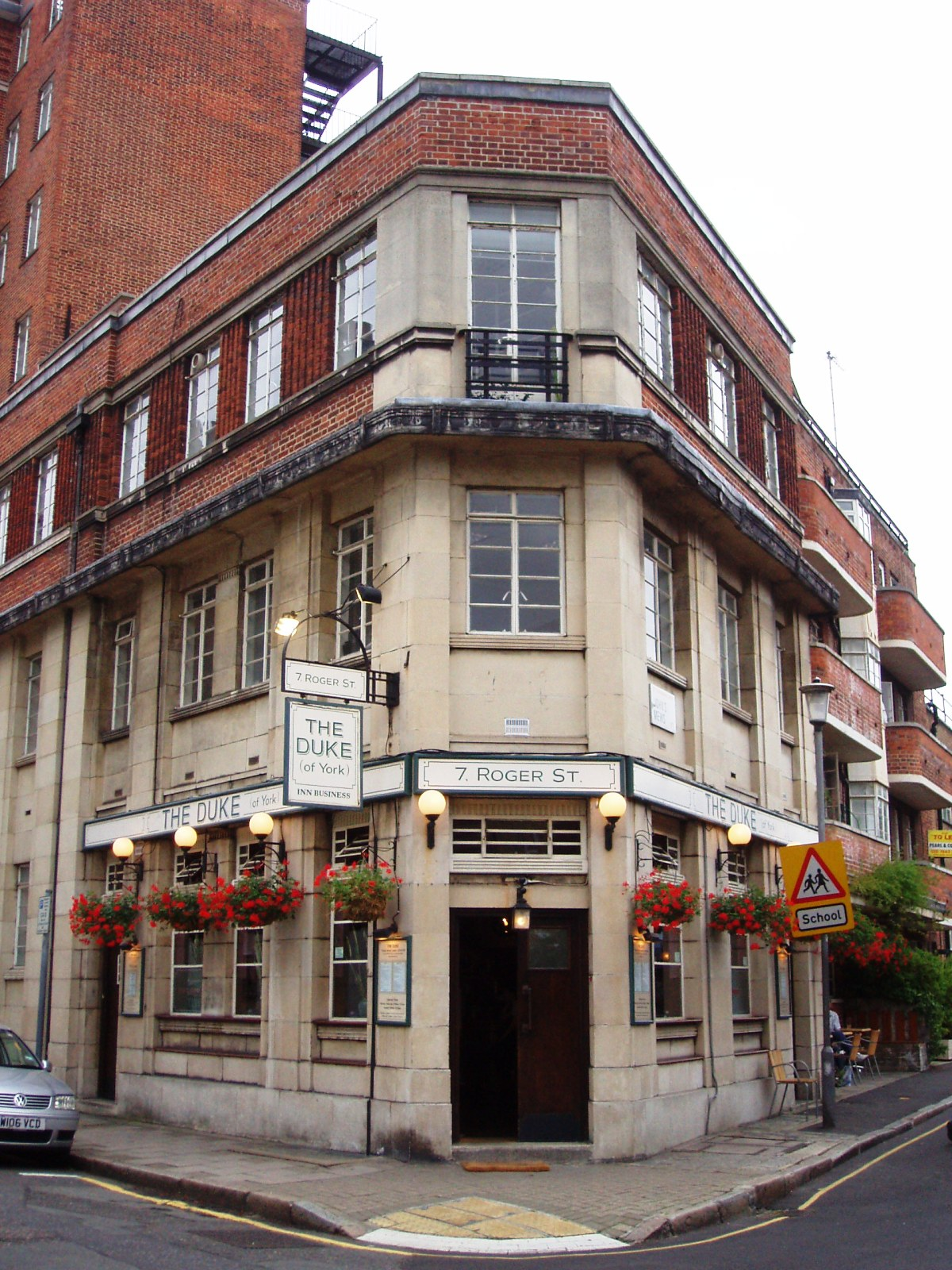
The Duke

The Duke of York is a Grade II listed public house at 7 Roger Street, in the London Borough of Camden.

== Pub building ==
It is on the Campaign for Real Ale's National Inventory of Historic Pub Interiors.

It forms part of Mytre House, built in 1937–38 by the architect D. E. Harrington.

== Setting ==
The pub sits on the south side of Roger Street, whose curved course follows the line of a small tributary of the River Fleet (a tributary sometimes known as Lamb's Conduit) which flowed east to join the Fleet near Mount Pleasant. The brook (and consequently Roger Street) formed Holborn's parish and later metropolitan borough boundary with St Pancras to the north. The parish of Bloomsbury lay around 300 metres west.

== See also ==
- List of pubs in London
