= List of baronetcies in the Baronetage of the United Kingdom: K =

Peerages and baronetcies of Britain and Ireland
| Extant | All |
|---|---|
| Dukes | Dukedoms |
| Marquesses | Marquessates |
| Earls | Earldoms |
| Viscounts | Viscountcies |
| Barons | Baronies |
| Baronets | Baronetcies |
En, Ire, NS, GB, UK (extinct)

This is a list of baronetcies in the Baronetage of the United Kingdom. They have been created since 1801 when they replaced the baronetages in the Baronetage of Great Britain, and Baronetage of Ireland. This list is not currently complete.

| Title | Date of creation | Surname | Current status | Notes |
|---|---|---|---|---|
| Kaberry of Adel-cum-Eccup | 1960 | Kaberry | extant | |
| Kay-Shuttleworth of Gawthorpe | 1849 | Kay-Shuttleworth | extant | second Baronet created Baron Shuttleworth in 1902 |
| Watson, later Kay of East Sheen | 1803 | Watson, Kay | extinct 1918 | |
| Kaye of Denby | 1812 | Kaye, Lister-Kaye | extant | |
| Kaye of Huddersfield | 1923 | Kaye | extant | |
| Keane of Belmont and Cappoquin | 1801 | Keane | extant | |
| Kearley of Wittingham | 1908 | Kearley | extant | first Baronet created Viscount Devonport in 1917 |
| Kekewich of Peamore | 1921 | Kekewich | extinct 1932 | |
| Kelk of Bentley Priory | 1874 | Kelk | extinct 1923 | |
| Kellett of Lota Begg | 1801 | Kellett | dormant | fourth Baronet died 1966 - under review |
| Kennard of Hordle Cliff | 1891 | Kennard | extinct 1999 | |
| Kennedy of Johnstown | 1836 | Kennedy | dormant | sixth Baronet died 1988. Note: An Edward Kennedy, presumably the father of the first Baronet of the 1836 creation, was gazetted a baronet, "of Johnstown Mount Kennedy in the County of Waterford", in October 1812. However, this creation does not appeared to have passed the Great Seal. |
| Kerr of Cambridge | 1957 | Kerr | extinct 1974 | |
| Kerrison of Hoxne Hall | 1821 | Kerrison | extinct 1886 | |
| Key of Thornbury and Denmark Hill | 1831 | Key | extinct 1932 | Lord Mayor of London |
| Keyes of Dover | 1919 | Keyes | extant | first Baronet created Baron Keyes in 1943 |
| Kimber of Lansdown Lodge | 1904 | Kimber | extant | |
| King of Campsie | 1888 | King | extant | Lord Provost of Glasgow |
| King of Charlestown | 1815 | King | extant | |
| King of Cornwall Gardens | 1932 | King | extinct 1933 | |
| King of Corrard and Bloomsbury | 1821 | King | extinct 1921 | |
| Kinloch-Cooke of Brighthelmstone | 1926 | Kinloch-Cooke | extinct 1944 | |
| Kinloch of Kinloch | 1873 | Kinloch | extant | |
| Kitson of Gledhowe Hall | 1886 | Kitson | extinct 1996 | first Baronet created Baron Airedale in 1907 |
| Kleinwort of Bolnore | 1909 | Kleinwort | extant | |
| Knighton of Carlston | 1813 | Knighton | extinct 1885 | |
| Knill of The Grove and Fresh Wharf | 1893 | Knill | extant | Lord Mayor of London |
| Knott of Close House | 1917 | Knott | extinct 1949 | |
| Knowles of Westwood | 1903 | Knowles | extinct 1928 | |
| Knox-Gore of Belleek Manor | 1868 | Knox-Gore | extinct 1890 | |
| Powell, later Kynaston of Hardwick | 1818 | Powell, Kynaston | extinct 1866 | |
| Kyrle-Money of Hom House, Whetham and Pitsford | 1838 | Kyrle-Money | extinct 1843 | |
