= List of baronetcies in the Baronetage of the United Kingdom: I =

Peerages and baronetcies of Britain and Ireland
Extant	All
Dukes	Dukedoms
Marquesses	Marquessates
Earls	Earldoms
Viscounts	Viscountcies
Barons	Baronies
Baronets	Baronetcies
En, Ire, NS, GB, UK (extinct)

This is a list of baronetcies in the Baronetage of the United Kingdom. They have been created since 1801 when they replaced the baronetages in the Baronetage of Great Britain, and Baronetage of Ireland. This list is not currently complete.

Title	Date of creation	Surname	Current status	Notes
Imbert-Terry of Strete Ralegh	1917	Imbert-Terry	extant	
Ingilby of Ripley and Harrington	1866	Ingilby	extant	
Inglis of Milton Bryan	1801	Inglis	extinct 1855	
Ingram of the Bungalow and Swineshead Abbey	1893	Ingram	extant	
Innes of Lochalsh and Coxton	1819	Innes	extinct 1831	
Irving of Woodhouse	1809	Irving	extinct 1866	
Isherwood of Rugglewood	1921	Isherwood	extinct 1946	
