= List of baronetcies in the Baronetage of the United Kingdom: F =

Peerages and baronetcies of Britain and Ireland
Extant	All
Dukes	Dukedoms
Marquesses	Marquessates
Earls	Earldoms
Viscounts	Viscountcies
Barons	Baronies
Baronets	Baronetcies
En, Ire, NS, GB, UK (extinct)

This is a list of baronetcies in the Baronetage of the United Kingdom. They have been created since 1801 when they replaced the baronetages in the Baronetage of Great Britain, and Baronetage of Ireland. This list is not currently complete.

Title	Date of creation	Surname	Current status	Notes
Fairbairn of Ardwick	1869	Fairbairn	extant	
Fairfax of Holmes	1836	Fairfax, Ramsay-Fairfax, Cameron-Ramsay-Fairfax, Lucy	extant	
Falkiner of Abbotstown	1812	Falkiner	extinct 1824	
Falle of Portsea	1916	Falle	extinct 1948	first Baronet created Baron Portsea in 1934
Falshaw of Edinburgh	1876	Falshaw	extinct 1889	Lord Provost of Edinburgh
Farquhar of White Lodge	1892	Farquhar	extinct 1923	first Baronet created Baron Farquhar in 1898
Farrar of Chicheley Hall	1911	Farrar	extinct 1915	
Farrer of Abinger	1883	Farrer	extinct 1964	first Baronet created Baron Farrer in 1893
Farrington of Wordon Hall	1818	Farrington	extant	
Faudel-Phillips of Grosvenor Gardens	1897	Faudel-Phillips	extinct 1941	Lord Mayor of London
Fayrer of Tullycleagh	1896	Fayrer	extinct 2017	
Feilden of Feniscowles	1846	Feilden	extant	
Ferguson-Davie of Creedy	1847	Ferguson-Davie	extant	
Fergusson, later Colyear-Fergusson of Spitalhaugh and George Street	1866	Fergusson, Colyer-Fergusson	extinct 2004	
Ferguson of The Farm	1802	Ferguson	extinct 1860	
Fettes of Comely Bank	1804	Fettis	extinct 1836	
Findlay of Aberlour	1925	Findlay	extinct 1979	
Finlay of Epping	1964	Finlay	extant	
Firth of The Flush	1909	Firth	extinct 1936	
Fison of Greenholme	1905	Fison	extant	
Fitzgerald of Geraldine Place	1903	Fitzgerald	extant	
Fitzgerald of Newmarket on Fergus	1822	Fitzgerald	extinct 1908	
Fitzgerald of Valencia	1880	Fitzgerald	extant	
Flannery of Wethersfield Manor	1904	Flannery	extinct 1959	
Flavelle of Toronto	1917	Flavelle	extinct 1985	
Fleetwood of Rossall Hall	1838	Fleetwood	extinct 1866	
Fletcher of Bryony Hill	1919	Fletcher	extinct 1924	
Fletcher of Carrow	1812	Fletcher	extinct 1876	
Flower of Lobb	1809	Flower	extinct 1850	Lord Mayor of London
Floyd of Chearsley Hill	1816	Floyd	extant	
Forbes-Leith of Fyvie	1923	Forbes-Leith	extant	
Forbes of Newe	1823	Forbes	extant	
Ford of Westerdunes	1929	Ford	extant	
Forestier-Walker of Rhiwderin	1929	Forestier-Walker	extinct 1934	
Forrest of Comiston	1838	Forrest	extinct 1928	Lord Provost of Edinburgh
Forster of Lysways Hall	1874	Forster	extinct 1930	
Forster of The Grange	1912	Forster	extinct 1930	
Forwood of Stoney Cross	1895	Forwood	extant	
Foster of Glyde Court	1831	Foster	extinct 1947	
Foster of Bloomsbury	1930	Foster	extant	
Foster of Norwich	1838	Foster	extinct 1960	
Fowke of Lowesby	1814	Fowke	extant	
Fowler of Gastard House and Bruce Grove	1885	Fowler	extinct 1902	Lord Mayor of London
Fowler of Braemore	1890	Fowler	extinct 1933	
Fox of Liverpool	1924	Fox	extinct 1959	
Frank of Withyam	1920	Frank	extant	
Fraser of Cromarty	1921	Fraser	extinct 1992	
Fraser of Ledeclune	1806	Fraser	extinct 1979	
Fraser of Tain	1943	Fraser	extant	
Fraser of Dineiddwg	1961	Fraser	extinct 1987	first Baronet created Baron Fraser of Allander in 1964
Freake of Cromwell House	1882	Cromwell	extinct 1951	
Freeling of the General Post Office and Ford and Hutchings	1828	Freeling	extinct 1941	
Freeman of Murtle	1945	Freeman	dormant	second Baronet died 1981
Fremantle of Swanbourne	1821	Fremantle	extant	first Baronet created Baron Cottesloe in 1874
Frere of Wimbledon	1876	Frere	extinct 1933	
Fry of Oare	1929	Fry	extinct 1960	
Fry of Woodburn	1894	Fry	extinct 1987	
Fuller-Acland-Hood of St Audries	1809	Fuller-Acland-Hood	dormant	fourth Baronet succeeded to Bateman Baronetcy of Hartington Hall in 1905 and was created Baron St Audries in 1911, the latter title which became extinct in 1971; seventh and fifth Baronet died 1971
Fuller-Eliott-Drake of Nutwell Court, Buckland Abbey and Yarcombe	1821	Fuller-Eliott-Drake	extinct 1916	
Fuller of Neston Park	1910	Fuller	extant	
Furness of Tunstall Grange	1913	Furness	extant	
