= List of baronetcies in the Baronetage of the United Kingdom: U =

Peerages and baronetcies of Britain and Ireland
Extant	All
Dukes	Dukedoms
Marquesses	Marquessates
Earls	Earldoms
Viscounts	Viscountcies
Barons	Baronies
Baronets	Baronetcies
En, Ire, NS, GB, UK (extinct)

This is a list of baronetcies in the Baronetage of the United Kingdom. They have been created since 1801 when they replaced the baronetages in the Baronetage of Great Britain, and Baronetage of Ireland. This list is not currently complete.

Title	Date of creation	Surname	Current status	Notes
Uniacke-Penrose-Fitzgerald of Lisquinlan	1896	Uniacke-Penrose-Fitzgerald	extinct 1919	
Usher of Norton	1899	Usher	extant	
