= List of lordships of Parliament =

Peerages and baronetcies of Britain and Ireland
Extant	All
Dukes	Dukedoms
Marquesses	Marquessates
Earls	Earldoms
Viscounts	Viscountcies
Barons	Baronies
En, Sc, GB, Ire, UK (law, life: 1958–1979, 1979–1997, 1997–2010, 2010–2024, 2024–present)
Baronets	Baronetcies

This page, one list of hereditary baronies, lists all lords of Parliament, extant, extinct, dormant, abeyant, or forfeit, in the Peerage of Scotland. For Scots barons, see list of baronies in the Baronage of Scotland.

== Lordships of Parliament, 1233–1707 ==
=== Before 1300 ===
Title	Date of creation	Surname	Current status	Notes
Lord Abernethy	1233	Abernethy	extinct 1325	
Lord Strathnaver	1235	de Moravia	extant	subsidiary title of the Earl of Sutherland
Lord of Balliol	before 1141	de Balliol	extinct	

=== 1301–1400 ===
Title	Date of creation	Surname	Current status	Notes
Lord Garioch	1320	of Mar	extant	also Earl of Mar
Lord Lindsay of Crawford	1398	Lindsay	extant	subsidiary title of the Earl of Crawford

=== 1401–1500 ===
Title	Date of creation	Surname	Current status	Notes
Lord Erskine	1429	Erskine	extant	also Earl of Mar (first creation) from 1438 until 1866 and Earl of Mar (seventh creation) and Earl of Kellie since 1866
Lord Hay	1429	Hay	extant	created Earl of Erroll in 1453
Lord Somerville	c.1435	Somerville	dormant 1870	
Lord Balveny	1437	Douglas	forfeit 1455	subsidiary title of the Earl of Avondale, also Earl of Douglas from 1440
Lord Lorne	1439	Stewart	resigned 1626	Created Earl of Atholl in 1596
Lord Cathcart	1442	Cathcart	extant	created Viscount Cathcart in the United Kingdom in 1807 and Earl Cathcart in the United Kingdom in 1814
Lord Forbes	1442	Forbes	extant	
Lord Crichton	1443	Crichton	forfeit 1484	
Lord Hamilton	1445	Hamilton	forfeit 1585	created Earl of Arran (Scotland) in 1503, lost by insanity of the 3rd earl
Lord Maxwell	1445	Maxwell	forfeit 1716	created Earl of Nithsdale in 1620
Lord Glamis	28 June 1445	Lyon	extant	created Earl of Kinghorne in 1606, which title changed to Earl of Strathmore and Kinghorne in 1677
Lord Graham	1445	Graham	extant	created Earl of Montrose in 1505, Marquess of Montrose in 1644 and Duke of Montrose in 1707
Lord Leslie and Ballinbreich	1445	Leslie	extant	created Earl of Rothes in 1458
Lord Lindsay of the Byres	1445	Lindsay	extant	created Earl of Lindsay in 1633
Lord Saltoun	1445	Abernethy	extant	
Lord Campbell	1445	Campbell	extant	created Earl of Argyll in 1457 and Duke of Argyll in 1701
Lord Gray	1445	Gray	extant	
Lord Montgomerie	1449	Montgomerie	extant	created Earl of Eglinton in 1508
Lord Sinclair	1449	Sinclair	forfeit 1729	
Lord Haliburton of Dirleton	1449	Halyburton	forfeit 1584	
Lord Fleming	1451	Fleming	extinct 1747	created Earl of Wigtown in 1606
Lord Seton	1451	Seton	forfeit 1716	created Earl of Winton in 1600
Lord Lyle	c. 1452	Lyle	dormant some time after 1551	
Lord Slains	1452	Hay	extant	subsidiary title of the Earl of Erroll
Lord Borthwick	1452	Borthwick	extant	
Lord Boyd	1454	Boyd	forfeit 1746	created Earl of Arran in 1467 which title forfeit 1469, created Earl of Kilmarnock in 1661
Lord Oliphant	1455	Oliphant	1633 (2nd) creation extinct 1748	
Lord Kennedy	1457	Kennedy	extant	created Earl of Cassillis in 1509 and Marquess of Ailsa in 1831
Lord Lovat	c. 1458	Fraser	extant	
Lord Livingston	1458	Livingston	forfeit 1716	created Earl of Linlithgow in 1600
Lord Darnley	1460	Stewart	merged in the Crown 1571	created Earl of Lennox in 1488
Lord Innermeath	1469	Stewart	extinct 1625	created Earl of Atholl in 1596
Lord Auchterhouse	1469	Stewart	extant	subsidiary title of the Earl of Buchan
Lord Berriedale	1469	Sinclair	extant	subsidiary title of the Earl of Caithness
Lord Lorne	1470	Campbell	extant	subsidiary title of the Earl of Argyll, created Duke of Argyll in 1701
Lord Carlyle of Torthorwald	1473	Carlyle	surrendered 1638	
Lord Home	1473	Home	extant	created Earl of Home in 1605
Lord of the Isles	1 July 1476	MacDonald	forfeit 1498	
Lord Bothwell	1485	Ramsay	forfeit 1488	
Lord Brechin and Navar	1488	Stewart	extinct 1504	subsidiary title of the Duke of Ross
Lord Ruthven	1488	Ruthven	forfeit 1600	created Earl of Gowrie in 1581
Lord Crichton of Sanquhar	1488	Crichton	extant	created Viscount of Ayr in 1622, Earl of Dumfries in 1633 and Marquess of Bute in the United Kingdom in 1804
Lord Drummond	1488	Drummond	extant	created Earl of Perth in 1605
Lord Hay of Yester	1488	Hay	extant	created Earl of Tweeddale in 1646 and Marquess of Tweeddale in 1694
Lord Sempill	1489	Sempill	extant	
Lord Herries of Terregles	1490	Herries	extant	
Lord Ogilvy of Airlie	28 April 1491	Ogilvy	extant	created Earl of Airlie in 1639
Lord Ross of Halkhead	1499	Ross	extinct 1754	

=== 1501–1600 ===
Title	Date of creation	Surname	Current status	Notes
Lord Elphinstone	1510	Elphinstone	extant	
Lord Ochiltree	1543	Stewart	extinct 1675	
Lord Abernethy and Strathearn	1562	Stewart	extant	subsidiary title of the Earl of Moray
Lord Torphichen	1564	Sandilands	extant	
Lord Ardmannoch	1565	Stewart	merged in the Crown 1567	subsidiary title of the Duke of Albany
Lord Darnley	1572	Stuart	extinct 1576	subsidiary title of the Earl of Lennox
Lord Darnley	1578	Stuart	resigned 1580	subsidiary title of the Earl of Lennox
Lord Darnley, Aubigny and Dalkeith	1580	Stuart	extinct 1672	subsidiary title of the Earl of Lennox, created Duke of Lennox in 1581
Lord Dunbar	1580	Stuart	extinct 1586	subsidiary title of the Earl of March
Lord Aubigny, Dalkeith, Torboltoun and Aberdour	1581	Stuart	extinct 1672	subsidiary title of the Duke of Lennox
Lord Doune	1581	Stewart	extant	also Earl of Moray since 1590
Lord Dingwall	1584	Keith	extinct 1600	
Lord Paisley	29 July 1587	Hamilton	extant	also Earl of Abercorn since 1621, created Marquess of Abercorn in Great Britain in 1790 and Duke of Abercorn in Ireland in 1868
Lord Altrie	29 July 1587	Keith	forfeit 1715	also Earl Marischal by 1596
Lord Spynie	1590	Lindsay	extinct 1671	
Lord Maitland	1590	Maitland	extant	created Viscount Lauderdale in 1616, Earl of Lauderdale in 1624 and Duke of Lauderdale in 1672, which title extinct 1682
Lord Aven	1591	Hamilton	extinct 1651	subsidiary title of the Marquess of Hamilton, created Duke of Hamilton in 1643
Lord Newbottle	1591	Kerr	extant	also Earl of Lothian since 1631, created Marquess of Lothian in 1701
Lord Fyvie	1598	Seton	forfeit 1690	created Earl of Dunfermline in 1605
Lord Gordon of Badenoch	1599	Gordon	extant	subsidiary title of the Marquess of Huntly
Lord Ardmannoch	23 December 1600	Stewart	merged in the Crown 1625	subsidiary title of the Duke of Albany
Lord Livingston and Callendar	1600	Livingston	forfeit 1716	subsidiary title of the Earl of Linlithgow
Lord Roxburghe	1600	Ker	extant	created Earl of Roxburghe in 1616 and Duke of Roxburghe in 1707

=== 1601–1700 ===
Title	Date of creation	Surname	Current status	Notes
Lord Campbell of Loudoun	30 June 1601	Campbell	extant	created Earl of Loudoun in 1633
Lord Kinloss	2 February 1602	Bruce	extant	
Lord Abercorn	5 April 1603	Hamilton	extant	created Earl of Abercorn in 1606, Marquess of Abercorn in Great Britain in 1790 and Duke of Abercorn in Peerage of Ireland in 1868
Lord Erskine of Dirleton	1603	Erskine	extant	created Viscount of Fentoun in 1606 and Earl of Kellie in 1619, also Earl of Mar (second creation) since 1875
Lord Colville of Culross	26 April 1604	Colville	extant	created Viscount Colville of Culross in the United Kingdom in 1902
Lord Murray of Tullibardine	1604	Murray	extant	subsidiary title of the Earl of Tullibardine, also Earl of Atholl since 1670, created Marquess of Atholl in 1676 and Duke of Atholl in 1703
Lord Scone	1605	Murray	extant	created Viscount of Stormont in 1621, also Earl of Mansfield in Great Britain since 1793
Lord Dunglass	1605	Home	extant	subsidiary title of the Earl of Home
Lord Balmerinoch	1606	Elphinstone	forfeit 1746	
Lord Blantyre	1606	Stuart	extinct 1900	
Lord Fleming and Cumbernauld	1606	Fleming	extinct 1747	subsidiary title of the Earl of Wigtown
Lord Lindores	1606	Leslie	dormant 1813	
Lord Ramsay of Barns	1606	Ramsay	extinct 1626	subsidiary title of the Viscount of Haddington, created Earl of Holderness in England in 1621
Lord Paisley, Hamilton, Mountcastell and Kilpatrick	10 July 1606	Hamilton	extant	subsidiary title of the Earl of Abercorn, Marquess of Abercorn in Great Britain in 1790 and Duke of Abercorn in Peerage of Ireland in 1868
Lord Scott of Buccleuch	1606	Scott	extant	created Earl of Buccleuch in 1619 and Duchess of Buccleuch in 1663, also Duke of Queensberry from 1810
Lord Coupar	1607	Elphinstone	forfeit 1746	Peerage title forfeit upon execution of Arthur Elphinstone
Lord Holyroodhouse	1607	Bothwell	dormant 1638	
Lord Garlies	1607	Stewart	extant	created Earl of Galloway in 1623
Lord Balfour of Burleigh	1607	Balfour	extant	
Lord Bruce of Kinloss	1608	Bruce	extant	also Lord Kinloss until 1747, created Earl of Elgin in 1633, also Earl of Kincardine since 1747
Lord Cranstoun	1609	Cramstoun	extinct 1869	
Lord Mackenzie of Kintail	1609	Mackenzie	forfeit 1716	created Earl of Seaforth in 1623
Lord Pittenweem	1609	Stewart	extinct 1625	
Lord Maderty	1609	Drummond	extant	created Viscount of Strathallan in 1686, also Earl of Perth since 1902
Lord Dingwall	1609	Preston	extant	
Lord Cardross	1610	Erskine	extant	also Earl of Buchan since 1695
Lord St Colme	1611	Stewart	extant	also Earl of Moray since 1620
Lord Binning and Byres	1613	Hamilton	extant	created Earl of Melrose in 1619, which title changed to Earl of Haddington in 1627
Lord Ramsay of Melrose	1615	Ramsay	surrendered 1618	also Viscount of Haddington
Lord Ogilvy of Deskford	1616	Ogilvy	dormant 1811	created Earl of Findlater in 1638
Lord Carnegie	1616	Carnegie	extant	created Earl of Southesk in 1633, also Duke of Fife in the United Kingdom since 1992
Lord Ker of Cessford and Cavertoun	1616	Ker	extant	subsidiary title of the Earl of Roxburghe, created Duke of Roxburghe in 1707
Lord Melville of Monymaill	1616	Melville	extant	created Earl of Melville in 1690, also Earl of Leven since 1707
Lord Ramsay of Dalhousie	1618	Ramsay	extant	created Earl of Dalhousie in 1633
Lord Byres and Binning	1619	Hamilton	extant	subsidiary title of the Earl of Melrose, which title changed to Earl of Haddington in 1627
Lord Scott of Whitchester and Eskdaill	1619	Scott	extant	subsidiary title of the Earl of Buccleuch, created Duchess of Buccleuch in 1663, also Duke of Queensberry from 1810
Lord Constable	1620	Constable	extinct 1718	subsidiary title of the Viscount of Dunbar
Lord Maxwell, Eskdake and Carleill	1620	Maxwell	forfeit 1716	subsidiary title of the Earl of Nithsdale
Lord Cary	1620	Cary	extant	subsidiary title of the Viscount of Falkland
Lord Murray of Lochmaben	1622	Murray	extinct 1658	subsidiary title of the Viscount of Annan, created Earl of Annandale in 1625
Lord Sanquhar	1622	Stuart	extant	subsidiary title of the Viscount of Ayr, created Earl of Dumfries in 1633 and Marquess of Bute in the United Kingdom in 1804
Lord Jedburgh	1622	Kerr	extant	also Marquess of Lothian since 1703
Lord Thirlestane and Boltoun	1624	Maitland	extant	subsidiary title of the Earl of Lauderdale, created Duke of Lauderdale in 1672, which title extinct 1682
Lord Murray of Tyninghame	1625	Murray	extinct 1658	subsidiary title of the Earl of Annandale
Lord of Kintyre	1626	Campbell	extant	created Earl of Irvine in 1642, which title extinct 1645, also Marquess of Argyll from 1645, created Duke of Argyll in 1701
Lord Aboyne	1627	Gordon	extinct 1630	subsidiary title of the Viscount of Melgum
Lord Aston of Forfar	1627	Aston	dormant 1751	
Lord Barrett	1627	Barrett	extinct 1645	
Lord Hay of Kinfauns	1627	Hay	extant	subsidiary title of the Viscount of Dupplin, created Earl of Kinnoull in 1633
Lord Napier	1627	Napier	extant	
Lord Fairfax of Cameron	1627	Fairfax	extant	
Lord Reay	1628	Mackay	extant	
Lord Dalzell	1628	Dalzell	dormant 1941	Subsidiary title of the Earl of Carnwath (1639); attainted 1716-1826
Lord Cramond	1628	Richardson	extinct 1735	
Lord Kirkcudbright	1633	MacLellan	dormant 1832	
Lord Abernethy and Jedburgh Forest	1633	Douglas	extant	Subsidiary title of the Marquess of Douglas.
Lord Bruce of Kinloss	1633	Bruce	extant	Subsidiary title of the Earl of Elgin.
Lord Crichton of Cumnock	1633	Crichton-Stuart	extant	Subsidiary title of the Earl of Dumfries. Held by the Marquess of Bute.
Lord Forbes of Pitsligo	1633	Forbes	attainted 1745	
Lord Forrester	1633	Forrester, Grimston	extant	Held by the Earl of Verulam.
Lord Tarrinzean and Mauchline	12 May 1633	Campbell	extant	Subsidiary title of the Earl of Loudoun.
Lord Ogilvy of Alith and Lintrathen	2 April 1639	Ogilvy	extant	Subsidiary title of the Earl of Airlie (1639); attainted 1717–1826
Lord Ruthven	1639	Ruthven	extinct 1651	
Lord Elibank	1643	Erskine-Murray	extant	
Lord Daer and Shortcleuch	1646	Douglas	extant	Subsidiary title of the Earl of Selkirk
Lord Abercrombie	12 December 1647	Sandilands	extinct 1681	
Lord Belhaven and Stenton	1647	Hamilton	extant	
Lord Bruce of Torry	1647	Bruce	extant	Subsidiary title of the Earl of Kincardine.
Lord Duffus	1650	Sutherland, Dunbar	extinct 1875	
Lord Colvill of Ochiltree	4 January 1651	Colvill	extinct 1728	
Lord Rollo	1651	Rollo	extant	created Baron Dunning in 1869.
Lord Ruthven of Freeland	1651	Hore-Ruthven	extant	Held by the Earl of Carlisle.
Lord Gordon of Strathaven and Glenlivet	10 September 1660	Gordon	extant	subsidiary title of the Earl of Aboyne; merged with Marquess of Huntly in 1836
Lord Macdonell and Aros	20 December 1660	Macdonell	extinct 1680	
Lord Campsie	17 August 1661	Livingston	extinct 1733	Subsidiary title of the Viscount of Kilsyth
Lord Bellenden	1661	Bellenden	dormant 1805	also Duke of Roxburghe from 1804 to 1805
Lord Douglas of Ettrick	1675	Douglas	extinct 1749	subsidiary title of the Earl of Dumbarton.
Lord St Clair	1677	Campbell	extinct 1995	Subsidiary title of the Earl of Caithness. Earldom of Caithness resigned 1681. Created Earl of Breadalbane and Holland in 1681. Created Marquess of Breadalbane in 1831 (extinct 1862). Created Marquess of Breadalbane in 1885 (extinct 1922).
Lord Glenurchy, Benederaloch, Ormelie and Weick	1681	Campbell	extinct 1995	Subsidiary title of the Earl of Breadalbane and Holland.
Lord Graham of Esk	1681	Graham	extinct 1739	subsidiary title of Viscount Preston
Lord Nairne	1681	Nairne, Petty-FitzMaurice	extant	Held by the Viscount Mersey.
Lord Haddo, Methlic, Tarves, and Kellie	30 November 1682	Gordon	extant	Subsidiary title of the Earl of Aberdeen.
Lord Churchill of Eyemouth	21 December 1682	Churchill	extinct 1722	
Lord Kinnaird	28 December 1682	Kinnaird	extinct 1997	created Baron Rossie in 1831 (extinct 1878) and Baron Kinnaird in 1860, both in the Peerage of the United Kingdom.
Lord Glasfoord	6 July 1685	Abercromby	extinct 1703	For the husband of the 9th Lady Sempill, for life.
Lord Dudhope	1686	Graham	extinct 1688	
Lord Graham of Claverhouse	1688	Graham	attainted 1746	Subsidiary title of the Viscount of Dundee
Lord Polwarth	1690	Hepburne-Scott	extant	
Lord Dechmont	1696	Hamilton	extant	Subsidiary title of Earl of Orkney
Lord Hillhouse	1697	Douglas	extinct 1810	Subsidiary title of the Earl of Ruglen, also Earl of Selkirk from 1739 to 1744, Earl of March from 1748 and Duke of Queensberry from 1778
Lord Polwarth of Polwarth, Redbraes and Greenlaw	1697	Hume	dormant 1794	Subsidiary title of the Earl of Marchmont.

=== 1701–1707 ===
Title	Date of creation	Surname	Current status	Notes
Lord Inverary, Mull, Mover and Tiry	1701	Campbell	extant	Subsidiary title of the Duke of Argyll.
Lord Hope	1703	Hope	extant	subsidiary title of the Earl of Hopetoun; created Marquess of Linlithgow (1902) in the United Kingdom
Lord Douglas of Bonkill, Prestoun and Robertoun	1703	Douglas	extinct 1761	Subsidiary title of the Duke of Douglas
Lord Mount Stuart, Cumbrae and Inchmarnock	1703	Crichton-Stuart	extant	Subsidiary title of the Earl of Bute. Held by the Marquess of Bute.
Lord Arase	1706	Campbell	extinct 1761	Subsidiary title of the Earl of Ilay.
Lord Dunoon	1706	Campbell	extinct 1761	Subsidiary title of the Earl of Ilay.
Lord Aberuthven, Mugdock and Fintrie	1707	Graham	extant	Subsidiary title of the Duke of Montrose.

== See also ==
- List of baronies in the Peerage of England
- List of baronies in the Peerage of Great Britain
- List of baronies in the Peerage of Ireland
- List of hereditary baronies in the Peerage of the United Kingdom
