= List of law life peerages =

Peerages and baronetcies of Britain and Ireland
Extant	All
Dukes	Dukedoms
Marquesses	Marquessates
Earls	Earldoms
Viscounts	Viscountcies
Barons	Baronies
En, Sc, GB, Ire, UK (law, life: 1958–1979, 1979–1997, 1997–2010, 2010–2024, 2024–present)
Baronets	Baronetcies

This is a list of life peerages in the peerage of the United Kingdom created under the Appellate Jurisdiction Act 1876. On 1 October 2009, the Appellate Jurisdiction Act 1876 was repealed by Schedule 18 to the Constitutional Reform Act 2005 owing to the creation of the Supreme Court of the United Kingdom. As a result, the power to create law life peers lapsed, although the validity of life peerages created thereunder remains intact.

== 1870s ==
Date of creation	Name	Title	Territorial qualification	Date of extinction
16 October 1876	Colin Blackburn	Baron Blackburn	of Killearn in the County of Stirling	8 January 1896
17 October 1876	Edward Gordon ‡	Baron Gordon of Drumearn	of Drumearn in the County of Stirling	21 August 1879

‡ former MP

== 1880s ==
Date of creation	Name	Title	Territorial qualification	Date of extinction
28 April 1880	William Watson ‡	Baron Watson	of Thankerton in the County of Lanark	14 September 1899
23 June 1882	John FitzGerald ‡	Baron FitzGerald	of Kilmarnock in the County of Dublin	16 October 1889
25 January 1887	Edward Macnaghten ‡	Baron Macnaghten	of Runkerry in the County of Antrim	17 February 1913
5 December 1889	Sir Michael Morris, Bt. ‡	Baron Morris	of Spiddal in the County of Galway	8 September 1901

‡ former MP

== 1890s ==
Date of creation	Name	Title	Territorial qualification	Date of extinction
28 January 1891	James Hannen	Baron Hannen	of Burdock in the County of Sussex	29 March 1894
23 September 1893	Charles Bowen	Baron Bowen	of Colwood in the County of Sussex	10 April 1894
7 May 1894	Charles Russell ‡	Baron Russell of Killowen	of Killowen in the County of Down	10 August 1900
13 August 1894	Horace Davey ‡	Baron Davey	of Fernhurst in the County of Sussex	20 February 1907
14 November 1899	James Robertson, Lord Robertson ‡ §	Baron Robertson	of Forteviot in the County of Perth	2 February 1909

‡ former MP
§ former Senator of the College of Justice

== 1900s ==
Date of creation	Name	Title	Territorial qualification	Date of extinction
10 May 1900	Nathaniel Lindley	Baron Lindley	of East Carleton in the County of Norfolk	9 December 1921
19 December 1905	John Atkinson ‡	Baron Atkinson	of Glenwilliam in the County of Limerick	13 March 1932
6 March 1907	Richard Collins	Baron Collins	of Kensington in the County of London	3 January 1911
22 February 1909	Thomas Shaw ‡	Baron Shaw	of Dunfermline in the County of Fife	28 June 1937

‡ former MP

== 1910s ==
Date of creation	Name	Title	Territorial qualification	Date of extinction
7 October 1910	William Robson ‡	Baron Robson	of Jesmond in the County of Northumberland	11 September 1918
1 October 1912	John Fletcher Moulton ‡	Baron Moulton	of Bank in the County of Southampton	9 March 1921
4 March 1913	Robert Parker	Baron Parker of Waddington	of Waddington in the County of York	12 July 1918
20 October 1913	John Hamilton	Baron Sumner	of Ibstone in the County of Buckingham	24 May 1934

‡ former MP

== 1920s ==
Date of creation	Name	Title	Territorial qualification	Date of extinction
1 June 1921	Edward Carson ‡	Baron Carson	of Duncairn in the County of Antrim	22 October 1935
12 October 1923	Robert Younger	Baron Blanesburgh	of Alloa in the County of Clackmannan	17 August 1946
6 February 1928	Richard Atkin	Baron Atkin	of Aberdovey in the County of Merioneth	25 June 1944
11 February 1929	Thomas Tomlin	Baron Tomlin	of Ash in the County of Kent	13 August 1935
1 May 1929	William Watson ‡	Baron Thankerton	of Thankerton in the County of Lanark	13 June 1948
18 November 1929	Frank Russell	Baron Russell of Killowen	of Killowen in the County of Down	20 December 1946

‡ former MP

== 1930s ==
Date of creation	Name	Title	Territorial qualification	Date of extinction
3 February 1930	Hugh Macmillan	Baron Macmillan	of Aberfeldy in the County of Perth	5 September 1952
11 April 1932	Robert Wright	Baron Wright	of Durley in the County of Wiltshire	27 June 1964
7 October 1935	Frederic Maugham	Baron Maugham	of Hartfield in the County of Sussex	23 March 1958
14 October 1935	Adair Roche	Baron Roche	of Chadlington in the County of Oxford	22 December 1956
5 January 1938	Mark Romer	Baron Romer	of New Romney in the County of Kent	19 August 1944
28 March 1938	Samuel Porter	Baron Porter	of Longfield in the County of Tyrone	13 February 1956

== 1940s ==
Date of creation	Name	Title	Territorial qualification	Date of extinction
18 April 1944	Gavin Simonds	Baron Simonds	of Sparsholt in the County of Southampton	28 June 1971
19 July 1944	Rayner Goddard	Baron Goddard	of Aldbourne in the County of Wiltshire	29 May 1971
9 January 1946	Augustus Uthwatt	Baron Uthwatt	of Lathbury in the County of Buckingham	24 April 1949
5 February 1946	Herbert du Parcq	Baron du Parcq	of Grouville in the Island of Jersey	27 April 1949
6 January 1947	Wilfrid Normand, Lord Normand ‡ §	Baron Normand	of Aberdour in the County of Fife	5 October 1962
18 April 1947	Fergus Morton	Baron Morton of Henryton	of Henryton in the County of Ayr	18 July 1973
23 April 1947	John MacDermott	Baron MacDermott	of Belmont in the City of Belfast	13 July 1979
6 October 1948	James Reid ‡	Baron Reid	of Drem in the County of East Lothian	29 March 1975
1 June 1949	Cyril Radcliffe	Baron Radcliffe	of Werneth in the County Palatine of Lancaster	1 April 1977

‡ former MP
§ former Senator of the College of Justice

== 1950s ==
Date of creation	Name	Title	Territorial qualification	Date of extinction
29 September 1950	James Tucker	Baron Tucker	of Great Bookham in the County of Surrey	17 November 1975
23 April 1951	Cyril Asquith	Baron Asquith of Bishopstone	of Bishopstone in the County of Sussex	24 August 1954
12 November 1951	Lionel Cohen	Baron Cohen	of Walmer in the County of Kent	9 May 1973
4 November 1953	James Keith, Lord Keith §	Baron Keith of Avonholm	of St. Bernard's in the City of Edinburgh	29 June 1964
4 October 1954	Donald Somervell ‡	Baron Somervell of Harrow	of Ewelme in the County of Oxford	18 November 1960
24 April 1957	Tom Denning	Baron Denning	of Whitchurch in the County of Southampton	5 March 1999
6 April 1959	David Jenkins	Baron Jenkins	of Ashley Gardens in the City of Westminster	21 July 1969

‡ former MP
§ former Senator of the College of Justice

== 1960s ==
Date of creation	Name	Title	Territorial qualification	Date of extinction
7 January 1960	John Morris	Baron Morris of Borth-y-Gest	of Borth-y-Gest in the County of Caernarvon	9 June 1979
1 October 1960	Charles Hodson	Baron Hodson	of Rotherfield Greys in the County of Oxford	11 March 1984
20 January 1961	Christopher Guest, Lord Guest §	Baron Guest	of Graden in the County of Berwick	25 September 1984
11 October 1961	Patrick Devlin	Baron Devlin	of West Wick in the County of Wilts	9 August 1992
19 April 1962	Edward Pearce	Baron Pearce	of Sweethaws in the County of Sussex	26 November 1990
26 November 1963	Gerald Upjohn	Baron Upjohn	of Little Tey in the County of Essex	27 January 1971
11 January 1964	Terence Donovan ‡	Baron Donovan	of Winchester in the County of Southampton	12 December 1971
1 October 1964	Richard Wilberforce	Baron Wilberforce	of the City and County of Kingston-upon-Hull	15 February 2003
18 February 1965	Colin Pearson	Baron Pearson	of Minnedosa in Canada and of the Royal Borough of Kensington and Chelsea	31 January 1980
30 September 1968	Kenneth Diplock	Baron Diplock	of Wansford in the County of Huntingdon and Peterborough	14 October 1985

‡ former MP
§ former Senator of the College of Justice

== 1970s ==
Date of creation	Name	Title	Territorial qualification	Date of extinction
12 March 1971	Geoffrey Cross	Baron Cross of Chelsea	of the Royal Borough of Kensington and Chelsea	4 August 1989
4 October 1971	James Shaw, Lord Kilbrandon §	Baron Kilbrandon	of Kilbrandon in the County of Argyll	10 September 1989
10 January 1972	Cyril Salmon	Baron Salmon	of Sandwich in the County of Kent	7 November 1991
1 October 1974	Edmund Davies	Baron Edmund-Davies	of Aberpennar in the County of Mid Glamorgan	26 December 1992
13 January 1975	Ian Fraser, Lord Fraser §	Baron Fraser of Tullybelton	of Bankfoot in the County of Perth	17 February 1989
30 September 1975	Charles Ritchie Russell	Baron Russell of Killowen	of Killowen in the County of Down	23 June 1986
10 January 1977	Henry Keith, Lord Keith §	Baron Keith of Kinkel	of Strathtummel in the District of Perth and Kinross	21 June 2002
30 September 1977	Leslie Scarman	Baron Scarman	of Quatt in the County of Salop	8 December 2004
28 September 1979	Geoffrey Lane	Baron Lane	of St. Ippollitts in the County of Hertfordshire	22 August 2005

§ former Senator of the College of Justice

== 1980s ==
Date of creation	Name	Title	Territorial qualification	Date of extinction
15 April 1980	Eustace Roskill	Baron Roskill	of Newtown in the County of Hampshire	4 October 1996
29 September 1980	Nigel Bridge	Baron Bridge of Harwich	of Harwich in the County of Essex	20 November 2007
24 September 1981	Henry Brandon	Baron Brandon of Oakbrook	of Hammersmith in Greater London	24 March 1999
12 March 1982	John Brightman	Baron Brightman	of Ibthorpe in the County of Hampshire	6 February 2006
30 September 1982	Sydney Templeman	Baron Templeman	of White Lackington in the County of Somerset	4 June 2014
23 May 1985	Hugh Griffiths	Baron Griffiths	of Govilon in the County of Gwent	30 May 2015
30 January 1986	Desmond Ackner	Baron Ackner	of Sutton in the County of West Sussex	21 March 2006
31 January 1986	Peter Oliver	Baron Oliver of Aylmerton	of Aylmerton in the County of Norfolk	17 October 2007
9 February 1986	Robert Goff	Baron Goff of Chieveley	of Chieveley in the Royal County of Berkshire	14 August 2016
9 February 1988	Charles Jauncey, Lord Jauncey §	Baron Jauncey of Tullichettle	of Comrie in the District of Perth and Kinross	18 July 2007

§ former Senator of the College of Justice

== 1990s ==
Living
Living but left the House of Lords

Date of creation	Name	Title	Territorial qualification	Date of retirement (if applicable)	Date of extinction (if applicable)
1 October 1991	Nick Browne-Wilkinson	Baron Browne-Wilkinson	of Camden in the London Borough of Camden	1 March 2016	25 July 2018
10 January 1992	Michael Mustill	Baron Mustill	of Pateley Bridge in the County of North Yorkshire		24 April 2015
11 March 1992	Gordon Slynn	Baron Slynn of Hadley	of Eggington in the County of Bedfordshire		7 April 2009
1 October 1992	Harry Woolf (Note: Former Lord Chief Justice.)	Baron Woolf	of Barnes in the London Borough of Richmond		
1 October 1993	Tony Lloyd (Note: Former Lord of the Appeal.)	Baron Lloyd of Berwick	of Ludlay in the County of East Sussex	27 March 2015	8 December 2024
11 January 1994	Michael Nolan	Baron Nolan	of Brasted in the County of Kent		22 January 2007
3 October 1994	Donald Nicholls (Note: Former Second Senior Lord of Appeal.)	Baron Nicholls of Birkenhead	of Stoke D'Abernon in the County of Surrey	3 April 2017	25 September 2019
11 January 1995	Johan Steyn	Baron Steyn	of Swafield in the County of Norfolk		28 November 2017
21 February 1995	Lennie Hoffmann	Baron Hoffmann	of Chedworth in the County of Gloucestershire		
1 October 1996	James Clyde, Lord Clyde §	Baron Clyde	of Briglands in Perth and Kinross		6 March 2009
6 January 1997	Brian Hutton	Baron Hutton	of Bresagh in the County of Down	23 April 2018	14 July 2020
28 July 1997	Mark Saville (Note: Former Justice of the Supreme Court.)	Baron Saville of Newdigate	of Newdigate in the County of Surrey	20 June 2024	
1 October 1998	John Hobhouse	Baron Hobhouse of Woodborough	of Woodborough in the County of Wiltshire		15 March 2004
1 October 1998	Peter Millett	Baron Millett	of St Marylebone in the City of Westminster	4 May 2017	27 May 2021
12 January 1999	Nick Phillips (Note: Former President of the Supreme Court.)	Baron Phillips of Worth Matravers	of Belsize Park in the London Borough of Camden		

§ former Senator of the College of Justice

== 2000s ==
Living
Living but left the House of Lords

Date of creation	Name	Title	Territorial qualification	Date of retirement (if applicable)	Date of extinction (if applicable)
17 July 2000	Richard Scott	Baron Scott of Foscote	of Foscote in the County of Buckinghamshire	21 December 2016	
1 October 2002	Robert Walker	Baron Walker of Gestingthorpe	of Gestingthorpe in the County of Essex	17 March 2021	16 November 2023
12 January 2004	Brenda Hale (Note: Former President of the Supreme Court.)	Baroness Hale of Richmond	of Easby in the County of North Yorkshire		
12 January 2004	Robert Carswell	Baron Carswell	of Killeen in the County of Down	29 October 2019	4 May 2023
13 January 2004	Simon Brown	Baron Brown of Eaton-under-Heywood	of Eaton-under-Heywood in the County of Shropshire	19 June 2023	7 July 2023
3 October 2005	Jonathan Mance (Note: Former Deputy President of the Supreme Court.)	Baron Mance	of Frognal in the London Borough of Camden		
11 January 2007	David Neuberger	Baron Neuberger of Abbotsbury	of Abbotsbury in the County of Dorset		
21 April 2009	Lawrence Collins	Baron Collins of Mapesbury	of Hampstead Town in the London Borough of Camden	18 May 2026	
29 June 2009	Brian Kerr	Baron Kerr of Tonaghmore	of Tonaghmore in the County of Down		1 December 2020

== Law life peers subsequently created hereditary peers ==
Law Lord	Life Peerage	Date	Hereditary Peerage	Date	Notes
Michael Morris ‡	Baron Morris	5 December 1889	Baron Killanin	15 June 1900	Extant
Thomas Shaw ‡	Baron Shaw	20 February 1909	Baron Craigmyle	7 March 1929	Extant
John Hamilton	Baron Sumner	20 Oct 1913	Viscount Sumner	31 January 1927	Extinct at his death 1930
Frederic Maugham	Baron Maugham	7 October 1935	Viscount Maugham	22 September 1939	Extinct at death of 2nd Viscount 1981
Gavin Simonds	Baron Simonds	18 Apr 1944	Baron Simonds	24 Jun 1952	Extinct at his death 1971
Gavin Simonds	Baron Simonds	18 Apr 1944	Viscount Simonds	18 Oct 1954	Extinct at his death 1971
Cyril Radcliffe	Baron Radcliffe	1 June 1949	Viscount Radcliffe	11 Jul 1962	Extinct at his death 1977

‡ former MP

== Other peers who served as Law Lords ==
=== Hereditary peers ===
Law Lord	Title	Created	Became Law Lord	Note
George Cave ‡	Viscount Cave	14 November 1918	15 January 1919	Extinct at his death 1928
Geoffrey Lawrence	Baron Oaksey	13 January 1947	15 April 1947	Extant
Wilfrid Greene	Baron Greene	16 July 1941	1 June 1949	Extinct at his death 1952
Raymond Evershed	Baron Evershed	20 January 1956	19 April 1962	Extinct at his death 1966
Reginald Manningham-Buller ‡	Baron Dilhorne	17 July 1962	9 June 1969	Extant
Reginald Manningham-Buller ‡	Viscount Dilhorne	7 December 1964	9 June 1969	Extant

‡ former MP

=== Peers created under the Life Peerages Act 1958 ===
Name	Title	Territorial qualification	Created	Became Law Lord	Date of extinction (if applicable)	Date of retirement (if applicable)
Jack Simon ‡	Baron Simon of Glaisdale	of Glaisdale in the North Riding of the County of York	5 February 1971	19 April 1971	7 May 2006	
James Mackay	Baron Mackay of Clashfern	of Eddrachillis in the District of Sutherland	6 July 1979	1 October 1985	7 July 2026	22 July 2022
David Hope	Baron Hope of Craighead	of Bamff in the District of Perth and Kinross	28 February 1995	1 October 1996		
Robin Cooke	Baron Cooke of Thorndon	of Wellington in New Zealand, and of Cambridge in the county of Cambridgeshire	3 April 1996	8 May 1996	30 August 2006	
Tom Bingham	Baron Bingham of Cornhill	of Boughrood in the County of Powys	4 June 1996	6 June 2000	11 September 2010	
Alan Rodger	Baron Rodger of Earlsferry	of Earlsferry in the District of North East Fife	29 April 1992	1 October 2001	26 June 2011	

‡ former MP

== List of Lords of Appeal in Ordinary ==
This is a complete list of people who have been appointed a Lord of Appeal in Ordinary under the terms of the Appellate Jurisdiction Act 1876. On 1 October 2009, the Lords Appeal in Ordinary became the first Justices of the Supreme Court of the United Kingdom.

Those appointees who were not already members of the House of Lords were created life peers; for their titles see above. Initially it was intended that peers created in this way would only sit in the House of Lords while serving their term as judges, but in 1887 (on the retirement of Lord Blackburn) the Appellate Jurisdiction Act 1887 provided that former judges would retain their seats for life. Under the terms of the Constitutional Reform Act 2005, which transferred the judicial functions of the House of Lords to the new Supreme Court, previous Law Lords who were transferred to the Supreme Court do not have the right to speak and vote in the House until they leave office.

Name	Served from	Served until	Reason	Previous judicial office	Notes
Lord Blackburn	16 October 1876	6 January 1887	Retired	Puisne Justice, Queen's Bench Division	
Lord Gordon of Drumearn	17 October 1876	21 August 1879	Died in office	None	
Lord Watson	28 April 1880	14 September 1899	Died in office	None	
Lord FitzGerald	23 June 1882	16 October 1889	Died in office	Puisne Justice, Queen's Bench Division, Ireland	
Lord Macnaghten	25 January 1887	1910	Retired	None	
Lord Morris	5 December 1889	10 May 1900	Retired	Lord Chief Justice of Ireland	
Lord Hannen	28 January 1891	15 August 1893	Retired	President of the Probate, Divorce and Admiralty Division	
Lord Bowen	23 September 1893	10 April 1894	Died in office	Lord Justice of Appeal	
Lord Russell of Killowen	7 May 1894	2 July 1894	Appointed Lord Chief Justice of England	None	
Lord Davey	13 August 1894	20 February 1907	Died in office	Lord Justice of Appeal	
Lord Robertson	14 November 1899	2 February 1909	Died in office	Lord President of the Court of Session	
Lord Lindley	10 May 1900	2 December 1905	Retired	Master of the Rolls	
Lord Atkinson	1905	1928	Retired	None	
Lord Collins	1907	1910	Retired	Master of the Rolls	
Lord Shaw	1909	1929	Retired	None	
Lord Robson	1910	1912	Retired	None	
Lord Moulton	1912	1921	Died in office	Lord Justice of Appeal	
Lord Parker of Waddington	1913	1918	Died in office	Justice, Chancery Division, High Court of Justice	
Lord Sumner	1913	1930	Retired	Lord Justice of Appeal	Created Viscount Sumner in 1927
Lord Dunedin	1913	1932	Retired	Lord President of the Court of Session	Created Viscount Dunedin in 1926
Viscount Cave	1918	1922	Appointed Lord High Chancellor of Great Britain	None	
Lord Carson	1921	1929	Retired	None	
Lord Blanesburgh	1923	1937	Retired	Lord Justice of Appeal	
Lord Atkin	1928	1944	Died in office	Lord Justice of Appeal	
Lord Tomlin	1929	1935	Died in office	Justice, Chancery Division, High Court of Justice	
Lord Russell of Killowen	1929	1946	Died in office	Lord Justice of Appeal	
Lord Thankerton	1929	1948	Died in office	None	
Lord Macmillan	1930	1939	Appointed Minister of Information	None	
Lord Wright	1932	1935	Appointed Master of the Rolls	Justice, King's Bench Division, High Court of Justice	
Lord Maugham	1935	1938	Appointed Lord High Chancellor of Great Britain	Lord Justice of Appeal	
Lord Roche	1935	1938	Retired	Lord Justice of Appeal	
Lord Wright	1937	1947	Retired	Lord of Appeal in Ordinary; Master of the Rolls	previously served 1932–1935
Lord Romer	1938	1944	Died in office	Lord Justice of Appeal	
Lord Porter	1938	1954	Retired	Justice, King's Bench Division, High Court of Justice	
Viscount Maugham	1939	1941	Retired	Lords of Appeal in Ordinary; Lord High Chancellor of Great Britain	previously served 1935–1938
Lord Macmillan	1941	1947	Retired	Lords of Appeal in Ordinary	Previously served 1930–1939
Lord Simonds	1944	1951	Appointed Lord High Chancellor of Great Britain	Puisne Justice, Chancery Division	
Lord Goddard	1944	1946	Appointed Lord Chief Justice of England	Lord Justice of Appeal	
Lord Uthwatt	1946	1949	Died in office		
Lord du Parcq	1946	1949	Died in office	Lord Justice of Appeal	
Lord MacDermott	1947	1951	Appointed Lord Chief Justice of Northern Ireland	Puisne Justice, High Court, Northern Ireland	
Lord Normand	1947	1953	Retired	Lord President of the Court of Session	
Lord Oaksey	1947	1957	Retired	Lord Justice of Appeal	
Lord Morton of Henryton	1947	1959	Retired	Lord Justice of Appeal	
Lord Reid	1948	1975	Died in office	None	Senior Law Lord 1959–1975
Lord Greene	1949	1950	Retired	Master of the Rolls	
Lord Radcliffe	1949	1964	Retired	None	Created Viscount Radcliffe in 1962
Lord Tucker	1950	1961	Retired	Lord Justice of Appeal	
Lord Asquith of Bishopstone	1951	1954	Died in office	Lord Justice of Appeal	
Lord Cohen	1951	1960	Retired	Lord Justice of Appeal	
Lord Keith of Avonholm	1953	1961	Retired	Senator of the College of Justice	
Lord Somervell of Harrow	1954	1960	Retired	Lord Justice of Appeal	
Viscount Simonds	1954	1962	Retired	Lords of Appeal in Ordinary; Lord High Chancellor of Great Britain	Previously served 1944–1951
Lord Denning	1957	1962	Appointed Master of the Rolls	Lord Justice of Appeal	
Lord Jenkins	1959	1963	Retired	Lord Justice of Appeal	
Lord Morris of Borth-y-Gest	1960	1973	Retired	Lord Justice of Appeal	
Lord Hodson	1960	1971	Retired	Lord Justice of Appeal	
Lord Guest	1961	1971	Retired	Senator of the College of Justice	
Lord Devlin	1961	1964	Retired	Lord Justice of Appeal	
Lord Pearce	1962	1969	Retired	Lord Justice of Appeal	
Lord Evershed	1962	1965	Retired	Master of the Rolls	
Lord Upjohn	1963	1971	Died in office	Lord Justice of Appeal	
Lord Donovan	1963	1971	Died in office	Lord Justice of Appeal	
Lord Wilberforce	1964	1982	Retired	Puisne Justice, Chancery Division	Senior Law Lord 1975–1982
Lord Pearson	1965	1974	Retired	Lord Justice of Appeal	
Lord Diplock	1968	1985	Died in office	Lord Justice of Appeal	Senior Law Lord 1982–1984
Viscount Dilhorne	1969	1980	Retired	Lord High Chancellor of Great Britain	
Lord Cross of Chelsea	1971	1975	Retired	Lord Justice of Appeal	
Lord Simon of Glaisdale	1971	1977	Retired	President of the Probate, Divorce and Admiralty Division	
Lord Kilbrandon	1971	1977	Retired	Senator of the College of Justice	
Lord Salmon	1972	1980	Retired	Lord Justice of Appeal	
Lord Edmund-Davies	1974	1981	Retired	Lord Justice of Appeal	
Lord Fraser of Tullybelton	1975	1985	Retired	Senator of the College of Justice	Senior Law Lord 1984–1985
Lord Russell of Killowen	1975	1982	Retired	Lord Justice of Appeal	
Lord Keith of Kinkel	1977	1996	Retired	Senator of the College of Justice	Senior Law Lord 1986–1996
Lord Scarman	1977	1986	Retired	Lord Justice of Appeal	Senior Law Lord 1985–1986
Lord Lane	1979	1980	Appointed Lord Chief Justice of England	Lord Justice of Appeal	
Lord Roskill	1980	1986	Retired	Lord Justice of Appeal	
Lord Bridge of Harwich	1980	1992	Retired	Lord Justice of Appeal	
Lord Brandon of Oakbrook	1981	1991	Retired	Lord Justice of Appeal	
Lord Brightman	1982	1986	Retired	Lord Justice of Appeal	
Lord Templeman	1982	1994	Retired	Lord Justice of Appeal	
Lord Griffiths	1985	1993	Retired	Lord Justice of Appeal	
Lord Mackay of Clashfern	1985	1987	Appointed Lord High Chancellor of Great Britain	Senator of the College of Justice	
Lord Ackner	1986	1992	Retired	Lord Justice of Appeal	
Lord Goff of Chieveley	1986	1998	Retired	Lord Justice of Appeal	Second Senior Law Lord 1994–1996; Senior Law Lord 1996–1998
Lord Oliver of Aylmerton	1986	1992	Retired	Lord Justice of Appeal	
Lord Jauncey of Tullichettle	1988	1996	Retired	Senator of the College of Justice	
Lord Lowry	1988	1994	Retired	Lord Chief Justice of Northern Ireland	
Lord Browne-Wilkinson	1991	2000	Retired	Vice-Chancellor	Senior Law Lord 1998–2000
Lord Mustill	1992	1997	Retired	Lord Justice of Appeal	
Lord Slynn of Hadley	1992	2002	Retired	Judge, European Court of Justice	Second Senior Law Lord 2000–2002
Lord Woolf	1992	1996	Appointed Master of the Rolls	Lord Justice of Appeal	
Lord Lloyd of Berwick	1993	1999	Retired	Lord Justice of Appeal	
Lord Nolan	1994	1998	Retired	Lord Justice of Appeal	
Lord Nicholls of Birkenhead	1994	2007	Retired	Vice-Chancellor	
Lord Steyn	1995	2005	Retired	Lord Justice of Appeal	
Lord Hoffmann	1995	20 April 2009	Retired	Lord Justice of Appeal	Second Senior Law Lord 2007–2009
Lord Cooke of Thorndon	1996	2001	Retired	President of the Court of Appeal of New Zealand	
Lord Hope of Craighead	1996	31 August 2009	Became Deputy President of the Supreme Court	Lord President of the Court of Session	Second Senior Law Lord 2009
Lord Clyde	1996	2001	Retired	Senator of the College of Justice	
Lord Hutton	1997	2004	Retired	Lord Chief Justice of Northern Ireland	
Lord Saville of Newdigate	1997	31 August 2009	Became Justice of the Supreme Court	Lord Justice of Appeal	
Lord Hobhouse of Woodborough	1998	2004	Retired	Lord Justice of Appeal	
Lord Millett	1998	2004	Retired	Lord Justice of Appeal	
Lord Phillips of Worth Matravers	1999	2000	Appointed Master of the Rolls	Lord Justice of Appeal	
Lord Bingham of Cornhill	2000	2008	Retired	Lord Chief Justice of England	Senior Law Lord 2000–2008
Lord Scott of Foscote	2000	31 August 2009	Retired	Vice-Chancellor	
Lord Rodger of Earlsferry	2001	31 August 2009	Became Justice of the Supreme Court	Lord President of the Court of Session	
Lord Walker of Gestingthorpe	2002	31 August 2009	Became Justice of the Supreme Court	Lord Justice of Appeal	
Lady Hale of Richmond	2004	31 August 2009	Became Justice of the Supreme Court	Lord Justice of Appeal	
Lord Carswell	2004	28 June 2009	Retired	Lord Chief Justice of Northern Ireland	
Lord Brown of Eaton-under-Heywood	2004	31 August 2009	Became Justice of the Supreme Court	Lord Justice of Appeal	
Lord Mance	2005	31 August 2009	Became Justice of the Supreme Court	Lord Justice of Appeal	
Lord Neuberger of Abbotsbury	2007	31 August 2009	Appointed Master of the Rolls	Lord Justice of Appeal	
Lord Phillips of Worth Matravers	2008	31 August 2009	Became President of the Supreme Court	Lords of Appeal in Ordinary; Lord Chief Justice of England and Wales; Master of the Rolls	Previously served 1999–2000; Senior Law Lord 2008–2009
Lord Collins of Mapesbury	21 April 2009	31 August 2009	Became Justice of the Supreme Court	Lord Justice of Appeal	
Lord Kerr of Tonaghmore	29 June 2009	31 August 2009	Became Justice of the Supreme Court	Lord Chief Justice of Northern Ireland	

== See also ==
- Armorial of Lords of Appeal

== Sources ==
- Chris Cook and Brendan Keith, British Historical Facts 1830–1900, Macmillan, 1975
- David Butler and Gareth Butler, Twentieth-Century British Political Facts 1900–2000, Macmillan, 2000
- Sir John Sainty, "The Judges of England 1272–1990", Selden Society 1993
