= List of life peerages =

Peerages and baronetcies of Britain and Ireland
Extant	All
Dukes	Dukedoms
Marquesses	Marquessates
Earls	Earldoms
Viscounts	Viscountcies
Barons	Baronies
En, Sc, GB, Ire, UK (law, life: 1958–1979, 1979–1997, 1997–2010, 2010–2024, 2024–present)
Baronets	Baronetcies

More than 1,700 life peerages have been created in the Peerage of the United Kingdom under the Life Peerages Act 1958. More than 850 life peerages have already become extinct.

- List of life peerages (1958–1979)
  - Created under the premierships of Harold Macmillan, Sir Alec Douglas-Home, Harold Wilson, Edward Heath, and James Callaghan
- List of life peerages (1979–1997)
  - Created under the premierships of Margaret Thatcher and John Major
- List of life peerages (1997–2010)
  - Created under the premierships of Tony Blair and Gordon Brown
- List of life peerages (2010–2024)
  - Created under the premierships of David Cameron, Theresa May, Boris Johnson, Liz Truss, and Rishi Sunak
- List of life peerages (2024–present)
  - Created under the premierships of Sir Keir Starmer and Andy Burnham

== See also ==
- List of current members of the House of Lords
- List of former members of the House of Lords (2000–present)
- List of hereditary peers in the House of Lords by virtue of a life peerage
- List of excepted hereditary peers
- List of law life peerages (1876–2009)
- List of life peerages (1377–1876)
- Prince Edward, Duke of Edinburgh, who has been created a duke for life
