= Lists of viscountcies =

Lists of viscountcies include:

- List of viscountcies in the peerages of Britain and Ireland
  - List of viscounts in the peerages of Britain and Ireland
- List of viscountcies in Portugal
