= King baronets =

Set index for King baronets

There have been six baronetcies created for persons with the surname King, one in the Baronetage of Ireland, one in the Baronetage of Great Britain and four in the Baronetage of the United Kingdom. Three of the creations are extant as of 2026.

- King baronets of Boyle Abbey (1682): see Earl of Kingston
- King baronets of Bellevue (1792): see Duckworth-King baronets
- King baronets of Charlestown (1815)
- King baronets of Corrard (1821)
- King baronets of Campsie (1888)
- King baronets, of Cornwall Gardens (1932): see Sir Henry King, 1st Baronet
