= List of baronies in the peerages of Britain and Ireland =

Peerages and baronetcies of Britain and Ireland
Extant	All
Dukes	Dukedoms
Marquesses	Marquessates
Earls	Earldoms
Viscounts	Viscountcies
Barons	Baronies
En, Sc, GB, Ire, UK (law, life: 1958–1979, 1979–1997, 1997–2010, 2010–2024, 2024–present)
Baronets	Baronetcies

The peerage is the collective term for all those holding titles of nobility of all degrees. The term superseded the term baronage used of the feudal era. A barony is a rank or dignity of a man or a woman who is a participant of a small rank of a British nobility.

== Barony categories ==
=== Life baronies ===
The life baronies fall into two classes:

- List of life peerages (created under the Life Peerages Act 1958):
  - List of life peerages (1958–1979)
  - List of life peerages (1979–1997)
  - List of life peerages (1997–2010)
  - List of life peerages (2010–2024)
  - List of life peerages (2024–present)
- List of law life peerages (created under the Appellate Jurisdiction Act 1876)

All life baronies are in the peerage of the United Kingdom, and rank amongst hereditary baronies in that peerage (and each other) by date of creation.

=== Hereditary baronies ===
The hereditary baronies fall into five classes:

- List of baronies in the peerage of England
- List of lordships of parliament (in the peerage of Scotland)
- List of baronies in the peerage of Great Britain
- List of baronies in the peerage of Ireland
- List of hereditary baronies in the peerage of the United Kingdom

These have precedence in the order named, except that baronies of Ireland created after 1 January 1801 (the date of the Union between Great Britain and Ireland) yield to earlier-created baronies of the United Kingdom.

=== Hereditary Scottish baronies ===
- List of baronies in the baronage of Scotland

=== Hereditary feudal baronies ===
These are distinct from the titles above, created by writ or patent, and were constituents of the now defunct feudal baronage and are not therefore constituents of the modern, post-feudal peerage:

- List of English feudal baronies
- List of Marcher lordships

== See also ==
- List of barons in the peerages of Britain and Ireland
