= List of earls in the peerages of Britain and Ireland =

Peerages and baronetcies of Britain and Ireland
Extant	All
Dukes	Dukedoms
Marquesses	Marquessates
Earls	Earldoms
Viscounts	Viscountcies
Barons	Baronies
Baronets	Baronetcies

This is a list of the 189 present earls in the Peerages of England, Scotland, Great Britain, Ireland, and the United Kingdom. It does not include extant earldoms which have become merged (either through marriage or elevation) with marquessates or dukedoms and are today only seen as subsidiary titles. For a list including these "hidden" earldoms as well as extinct, dormant, abeyant, and forfeit ones, see List of earldoms.

== Order of precedence ==
Heraldic representation of the Coronet of a British Earl

The general order of precedence among earls is:

1. Earls in the Peerage of England
2. Earls in the Peerage of Scotland
3. Earls in the Peerage of Great Britain
4. Earls in the Peerage of Ireland created before 1801
5. Earls in the Peerage of the United Kingdom and Earls in the Peerage of Ireland created after 1801

== Earls in the Peerages of Britain and Ireland ==
Note: The precedence of the older Scottish earldoms is determined by the Decreet of Ranking of 1606, and not by seniority.

Order	Title	Date of creation	Peerage	Current holder			
Order	Title	Date of creation	Peerage	Earl	Age	Acceded	Heir Apparent Presumptive
1	Earl of Shrewsbury	1442	England	Charles Chetwynd-Talbot, 22nd Earl of Shrewsbury, 22nd Earl of Waterford, 7th Earl Talbot	73	1980	James Chetwynd-Talbot, Viscount Ingestre
1	Earl of Waterford	1446	Ireland	Charles Chetwynd-Talbot, 22nd Earl of Shrewsbury, 22nd Earl of Waterford, 7th Earl Talbot	73	1980	James Chetwynd-Talbot, Viscount Ingestre
1	Earl Talbot	1784	Great Britain	Charles Chetwynd-Talbot, 22nd Earl of Shrewsbury, 22nd Earl of Waterford, 7th Earl Talbot	73	1980	James Chetwynd-Talbot, Viscount Ingestre
2	Earl of Derby	1485	England	Edward Stanley, 19th Earl of Derby	64	1994	Edward Stanley, Lord Stanley
3	Earl of Huntingdon	1529	England	William Hastings-Bass, 17th Earl of Huntingdon	78	1990	John Hastings-Bass (brother)
4	Earl of Pembroke	1551	England	William Herbert, 18th Earl of Pembroke, 15th Earl of Montgomery	48	2003	Reginald Herbert, Lord Herbert
4	Earl of Montgomery	1605	England	William Herbert, 18th Earl of Pembroke, 15th Earl of Montgomery	48	2003	Reginald Herbert, Lord Herbert
5	Earl of Devon	1553	England	Charles Courtenay, 19th Earl of Devon	51	2019	Jack Courtenay, Lord Courtenay
6	Earl of Lincoln	1572	England	Robert Fiennes-Clinton, 19th Earl of Lincoln	54	2001	William Howson (brother)
7	Earl of Suffolk	1603	England	Alexander Howard, 22nd Earl of Suffolk	52	2022	Arthur Howard, Viscount Andover
7	Earl of Berkshire	1626	England	Alexander Howard, 22nd Earl of Suffolk	52	2022	Arthur Howard, Viscount Andover
8	Earl of Denbigh	1622	England	Alexander Feilding, 12th Earl of Denbigh, 11th Earl of Desmond	55	1995	Peregrine Feilding, Viscount Feilding
8	Earl of Desmond	1628	Ireland	Alexander Feilding, 12th Earl of Denbigh, 11th Earl of Desmond	55	1995	Peregrine Feilding, Viscount Feilding
9	Earl of Westmorland	1624	England	Anthony Fane, 16th Earl of Westmorland	75	1993	Sam Fane (nephew)
10	Earl of Lindsey	1626	England	Richard Bertie, 14th Earl of Lindsey, 9th Earl of Abingdon	95	1969	Henry Bertie, Lord Norreys
10	Earl of Abingdon	1682	England	Richard Bertie, 14th Earl of Lindsey, 9th Earl of Abingdon	95	1969	Henry Bertie, Lord Norreys
11	Earl of Winchilsea	1628	England	Daniel Finch-Hatton, 17th Earl of Winchilsea; 12th Earl of Winchilsea	59	1999	Tobias Finch-Hatton, Viscount Maidstone
11	Earl of Nottingham	1681	England	Daniel Finch-Hatton, 17th Earl of Winchilsea; 12th Earl of Winchilsea	59	1999	Tobias Finch-Hatton, Viscount Maidstone
12	Earl of Sandwich	1660	England	Luke Montagu, 12th Earl of Sandwich	56	2025	William Montagu, Viscount Hinchingbrooke
13	Earl of Essex	1661	England	Paul Capell, 11th Earl of Essex	82	2005	William Jennings Capell (fourth cousin once removed)
14	Earl of Carlisle	1661	England	George Howard, 13th Earl of Carlisle	77	1994	Philip Howard (brother)
15	Earl of Shaftesbury	1672	England	Nicholas Ashley-Cooper, 12th Earl of Shaftesbury	47	2005	Anthony Ashley-Cooper, Lord Ashley
16	Earl of Portland	1689	England	Timothy Bentinck, 12th Earl of Portland	73	1997	William Bentinck, Viscount Woodstock
17	Earl of Scarbrough	1690	England	Richard Lumley, 13th Earl of Scarbrough	53	2014	Thomas Lumley (brother)
18	Earl of Albemarle	1697	England	Rufus Keppel, 10th Earl of Albemarle	61	1979	Augustus Keppel, Viscount Bury
19	Earl of Coventry	1697	England	George Coventry, 13th Earl of Coventry	87	2004	David Coventry (nephew)
20	Earl of Jersey	1697	England	William Child-Villiers, 10th Earl of Jersey	50	1998	George Child-Villiers, Viscount Villiers
21	Earl of Crawford	1398	Scotland	Anthony Lindsay, 30th Earl of Crawford, 13th Earl of Balcarres	67	2023	Alexander Lindsay, Lord Balniel
21	Earl of Balcarres	1651	Scotland	Anthony Lindsay, 30th Earl of Crawford, 13th Earl of Balcarres	67	2023	Alexander Lindsay, Lord Balniel
22	Earl of Erroll	1453	Scotland	Merlin Hay, 24th Earl of Erroll	78	1978	Harry Hay, Lord Hay
23	Earl of Sutherland	1230 or 1275 or 1347	Scotland	Alastair Sutherland, 25th Earl of Sutherland	79	2019	Rachel Elizabeth Sutherland (daughter)
24	Countess of Mar	1114 or 1457	Scotland	Margaret of Mar, 31st Countess of Mar	86	1975	Susan of Mar, Mistress of Mar (daughter)
25	Earl of Rothes	1458	Scotland	James Leslie, 22nd Earl of Rothes	68	2005	Alexander Leslie (brother)
26	Earl of Morton	1458	Scotland	Stewart Douglas, 22nd Earl of Morton	74	2016	John Douglas, Lord Aberdour
27	Earl of Buchan	1469	Scotland	Henry Erskine, 18th Earl of Buchan	66	2022	Alexander Erskine, Lord Cardross
28	Earl of Eglinton	1508	Scotland	Hugh Montgomerie, 19th Earl of Eglinton, 7th Earl of Winton	60	2018	Rhuridh Montgomerie, Lord Montgomerie
28	Earl of Winton	1859	United Kingdom	Hugh Montgomerie, 19th Earl of Eglinton, 7th Earl of Winton	60	2018	Rhuridh Montgomerie, Lord Montgomerie
29	Earl of Caithness	1455	Scotland	Malcolm Sinclair, 20th Earl of Caithness	77	1965	Alexander Sinclair, Lord Berriedale
30	Earl of Mar and Kellie	1404 or 1565	Scotland	James Erskine, 14th Earl of Mar	77	1993	Alexander Erskine (brother)
31	Earl of Moray	1562	Scotland	John Stuart, 21st Earl of Moray	60	2011	James Stuart, Lord Doune
32	Earl of Home	1605	Scotland	Michael Douglas-Home, 16th Earl of Home	38	2022	Leo Gregory Cospatrick Douglas-Home, Lord Dunglass
33	Earl of Perth	1605	Scotland	James David Drummond, 10th Earl of Perth	60	2023	Robert Eric Drummond (brother)
34	Earl of Strathmore and Kinghorne	1606	Scotland	Simon Bowes-Lyon, 19th (Scotland) and 6th (UK) Earl of Strathmore and Kinghorne	40	2016	John Bowes-Lyon (brother)
34	Earl of Strathmore and Kinghorne	1937	United Kingdom	Simon Bowes-Lyon, 19th (Scotland) and 6th (UK) Earl of Strathmore and Kinghorne	40	2016	John Bowes-Lyon (brother)
35	Earl of Haddington	1619	Scotland	George Baillie-Hamilton, 14th Earl of Haddington	40	2020	Sullivan Simon Baillie-Hamilton, Lord Binning
36	Earl of Galloway	1623	Scotland	Andrew Stewart, 14th Earl of Galloway	77	2020	Alexander Patrick Stewart, Lord Darlies
37	Earl of Lauderdale	1624	Scotland	Ian Maitland, 18th Earl of Lauderdale	88	2008	John Maitland, Viscount Maitland
38	Earl of Lindsay	1633	Scotland	William Lindesay-Bethune, 17th Earl of Lindsay	35	2026	John Lindesay-Bethune, Viscount Garnock
39	Earl of Loudoun	1633	Scotland	Simon Abney-Hastings, 15th Earl of Loudoun	51	2012	Marcus Abney-Hastings (half-brother)
40	Earl of Kinnoull	1633	Scotland	Charles Hay, 16th Earl of Kinnoull	63	2013	William Hay, Viscount Dupplin
41	Earl of Elgin	1633	Scotland	Andrew Bruce, 11th Earl of Elgin, 15th Earl of Kincardine	102	1968	Charles Bruce, Lord Bruce
41	Earl of Kincardine	1647	Scotland	Andrew Bruce, 11th Earl of Elgin, 15th Earl of Kincardine	102	1968	Charles Bruce, Lord Bruce
42	Earl of Wemyss	1633	Scotland	James Charteris, 13th Earl of Wemyss, 9th Earl of March	78	2008	Richard Charteris, Lord Elcho
42	Earl of March	1697	Scotland	James Charteris, 13th Earl of Wemyss, 9th Earl of March	78	2008	Richard Charteris, Lord Elcho
43	Earl of Dalhousie	1633	Scotland	James Ramsay, 17th Earl of Dalhousie	78	1999	Simon Ramsay, Lord Ramsay
44	Earl of Airlie	1639	Scotland	David Ogilvy, 14th Earl of Airlie	68	2023	David Ogilvy, Lord Ogilvy
45	Earl of Leven	1641	Scotland	Alexander Ian Leslie-Melville, 15th Earl of Leven, 14th Earl of Melville	41	2012	Archibald Leslie-Melville (uncle)
45	Earl of Melville	1690	Scotland	Alexander Ian Leslie-Melville, 15th Earl of Leven, 14th Earl of Melville	41	2012	Archibald Leslie-Melville (uncle)
46	Earl of Dysart	1643	Scotland	John Grant, 13th Earl of Dysart	79	2011	James Grant of Rothiemurchus, Lord Huntingtower
47	Earl of Selkirk	1646	Scotland	John Douglas-Hamilton, 12th Earl of Selkirk	48	2023	Charles Douglas-Hamilton (brother)
48	Earl of Northesk	1647	Scotland	Patrick Carnegy, 15th Earl of Northesk	86	2010	Colin Carnegy (brother)
49	Earl of Dundee	1660	Scotland	Alexander Scrymgeour, 12th Earl of Dundee	77	1983	Henry Scrymgeour-Wedderburn, Lord Scrymgeour
50	Earl of Newburgh	1660	Scotland	Filippo Rospigliosi, 11th Prince Rospigliosi, 12th Earl of Newburgh	83–84	1986	Princess Benedetta Rospigliosi, Mistress of Newburgh (daughter)
51	Earl of Annandale and Hartfell	1662	Scotland	Patrick Hope-Johnstone, 11th Earl of Annandale and Hartfell	85	1983	David Hope-Johnstone, Lord Johnstone
52	Earl of Dundonald	1669	Scotland	Iain Cochrane, 15th Earl of Dundonald	65	1986	Archibald Cochrane, Lord Cochrane
53	Earl of Kintore	1677	Scotland	James Keith, 14th Earl of Kintore	50	2004	Tristan Keith, Lord Inverurie
54	Earl of Dunmore	1686	Scotland	Malcolm Murray, 12th Earl of Dunmore	80	1995	Geoffrey Murray (brother)
55	Earl of Orkney	1696	Scotland	Peter St John, 9th Earl of Orkney	88	1998	Oliver St John, Viscount Kirkwall
56	Earl of Seafield	1701	Scotland	Ian Ogilvie-Grant, 13th Earl of Seafield	87	1969	James Studley, Viscount Reidhaven
57	Earl of Stair	1703	Scotland	John Dalrymple, 14th Earl of Stair	65	1996	John Dalrymple, Viscount Dalrymple
58	Earl of Rosebery	1703	Scotland	Harry Primrose, 8th Earl of Rosebery, 4th Earl of Midlothian	58	2024	Albert Primrose, Lord Dalmeny
58	Earl of Midlothian	1911	United Kingdom	Harry Primrose, 8th Earl of Rosebery, 4th Earl of Midlothian	58	2024	Albert Primrose, Lord Dalmeny
59	Earl of Glasgow	1703	Scotland	Patrick Boyle, 10th Earl of Glasgow	87	1984	David Boyle, Viscount of Kelburn
60	Earl Ferrers	1711	Great Britain	Robert Shirley, 14th Earl Ferrers	73	2012	William Shirley, Viscount Tamworth
61	Earl of Dartmouth	1711	Great Britain	William Legge, 10th Earl of Dartmouth	77	1997	Rupert Legge (brother)
62	Earl of Tankerville	1714	Great Britain	Peter Bennet, 10th Earl of Tankerville	70	1980	Adrian Bennet (first cousin)
63	Earl of Aylesford	1714	Great Britain	Charles Finch-Knightley, 12th Earl of Aylesford	79	2008	James Finch-Knightley, Lord Guernsey
64	Earl of Macclesfield	1721	Great Britain	Richard Parker, 9th Earl of Macclesfield	83	1992	David Parker (brother)
65	Earl Waldegrave	1729	Great Britain	James Waldegrave, 13th Earl Waldegrave	85	1995	Edward Waldegrave, Viscount Chewton
66	Earl of Harrington	1742	Great Britain	Charles Stanhope, 12th Earl of Harrington	81	2009	William Stanhope, Viscount Petersham
67	Earl of Portsmouth	1743	Great Britain	Quentin Wallop, 10th Earl of Portsmouth	72	1984	Oliver Wallop, Viscount Lymington
68	Earl of Warwick	1759	Great Britain	Guy Greville, 9th Earl of Warwick	69	1996	Charles Greville, Lord Brooke
69	Earl of Buckinghamshire	1746	Great Britain	George Hobart-Hampden, 10th Earl of Buckinghamshire	81	1983	Sir John Hobart, 4th Baronet (fourth cousin once removed)
70	Earl of Guilford	1752	Great Britain	Piers North, 10th Earl of Guilford	55	1999	Frederick North, Lord North
71	Earl of Hardwicke	1754	Great Britain	Joseph Yorke, 10th Earl of Hardwicke	55	1974	Philip Yorke, Viscount Royston
72	Earl of Ilchester	1756	Great Britain	Robin Fox-Strangways, 10th Earl of Ilchester	84	2006	Simon Fox-Strangways, Lord Stavordale
73	Earl De La Warr	1761	Great Britain	William Sackville, 11th Earl De La Warr	77	1988	William Sackville, Lord Buckhurst
74	Earl of Radnor	1765	Great Britain	William Pleydell-Bouverie, 9th Earl of Radnor	71	2008	Jacob Pleydell-Bouverie, Viscount Folkestone
75	Earl Spencer	1765	Great Britain	Charles Spencer, 9th Earl Spencer	62	1992	Louis Spencer, Viscount Althorp
76	Earl Bathurst	1772	Great Britain	Allen Bathurst, 9th Earl Bathurst	65	2011	Benjamin Bathurst, Lord Apsley
77	Earl of Clarendon	1776	Great Britain	George Villiers, 8th Earl of Clarendon	50	2009	Edward Villiers, Lord Hyde
78	Earl of Mansfield	1776	Great Britain	Alexander Murray, 9th Earl of Mansfield	70	2015	William Murray, Viscount Stormont
79	Earl of Mount Edgcumbe	1789	Great Britain	Christopher Edgcumbe, 9th Earl of Mount Edgcumbe	75–76	2021	Douglas Edgcumbe, Viscount Valletort
80	Earl Fortescue	1789	Great Britain	Charles Fortescue, 8th Earl Fortescue	75	1993	John Fortescue (first cousin)
81	Earl of Carnarvon	1793	Great Britain	George Herbert, 8th Earl of Carnarvon	69	2001	William Herbert, Lord Porchester
82	Earl Cadogan	1800	Great Britain	Edward Cadogan, 9th Earl Cadogan	60	2023	George Cadogan, Viscount Chelsea
83	Earl of Malmesbury	1800	Great Britain	James Harris, 7th Earl of Malmesbury	80	2000	James Harris, Viscount FitzHarris
84	Earl of Cork	1620	Ireland	John Boyle, 15th Earl of Cork, 15th Earl of Orrery	80	2003	Jonathan Boyle, Viscount Dungarvan
84	Earl of Orrery	1660	Ireland	John Boyle, 15th Earl of Cork, 15th Earl of Orrery	80	2003	Jonathan Boyle, Viscount Dungarvan
85	Earl of Westmeath	1621	Ireland	Sean Charles Weston Nugent, 14th Earl of Westmeath	61	2026	Patrick Nugent (brother)
86	Earl of Meath	1627	Ireland	John Brabazon, 15th Earl of Meath	85	1998	Anthony Brabazon, Lord Ardee
87	Earl of Cavan	1647	Ireland	Roger Lambart, 13th Earl of Cavan	82	1988	Cavan Lambart (cousin)
88	Earl of Drogheda	1661	Ireland	Derry Moore, 12th Earl of Drogheda	89	1989	Benjamin Moore, Viscount Moore
89	Earl of Granard	1684	Ireland	Peter Forbes, 10th Earl of Granard	69	1992	Jonathan Forbes, Viscount Forbes
90	Earl of Darnley	1725	Ireland	Ivo Bligh, 12th Earl of Darnley	58	2017	Ivo Bligh, Lord Clifton
91	Earl of Bessborough	1739	Ireland	Myles Ponsonby, 12th Earl of Bessborough	85	2002	Frederick Ponsonby, Viscount Duncannon
92	Earl of Carrick	1748	Ireland	(Arion) Thomas Piers Hamilton Butler, 11th Earl of Carrick	51	2008	Piers Butler (brother)
93	Earl of Shannon	1756	Ireland	Richard Boyle, 10th Earl of Shannon	66	2013	Robert Boyle (second cousin)
94	Earl of Arran	1762	Ireland	Arthur Gore, 9th Earl of Arran	88	1983	William Gore (cousin once removed)
95	Earl of Courtown	1762	Ireland	Patrick Stopford, 9th Earl of Courtown	72	1975	James Stopford, Viscount Stopford
96	Earl of Mexborough	1766	Ireland	James Savile, 9th Earl of Mexborough	49–50	2026	Arthur Savile, Viscount Pollington
97	Earl Winterton	1766	Ireland	David Turnour, 8th Earl Winterton	83	1991	Robert Turnour (brother)
98	Earl of Kingston	1768	Ireland	Robert King-Tenison, 12th Earl of Kingston	57	2002	Charles King-Tenison, Viscount Kingsborough
99	Earl of Roden	1771	Ireland	Robert Jocelyn, 10th Earl of Roden	88	1993	Shane Jocelyn, Viscount Jocelyn
100	Earl of Lisburne	1776	Ireland	David Vaughan, 9th Earl of Lisburne	81	2014	Michael Vaughn (brother)
101	Earl of Clanwilliam	1776	Ireland	Patrick Meade, 8th Earl of Clanwilliam	65	2009	John Meade, Lord Gillford
102	Earl of Antrim	1785	Ireland	Randal Alexander McDonnell, 10th Earl of Antrim	59	2021	Randal McDonnell, Viscount Dunluce
103	Earl of Longford	1785	Ireland	Thomas Pakenham, 8th Earl of Longford	93	2001	Edward Pakenham, Lord Silchester
104	Earl of Portarlington	1785	Ireland	Charles Dawson-Damer, 8th Earl of Portarlington	61	2024	Henry Dawson-Damer, Viscount Carlow
105	Earl of Mayo	1785	Ireland	Charles Bourke, 11th Earl of Mayo	73	2006	Richard Bourke, Lord Naas
106	Earl Annesley	1789	Ireland	Michael Annesley, 12th Earl Annesley	92	2011	Michael Annesley, Viscount Glerawly
107	Earl of Enniskillen	1789	Ireland	Andrew Cole, 7th Earl of Enniskillen	84	1989	Berkeley Cole (first cousin)
108	Earl Erne	1789	Ireland	John Crichton, 7th Earl Erne	55	2015	Charles Crichton (second cousin once removed)
109	Earl of Lucan	1795	Ireland	George Bingham, 8th Earl of Lucan	59	2016	Charles Bingham, Lord Bingham
110	Earl Belmore	1797	Ireland	John Lowry-Corry, 8th Earl Belmore	75	1960	John Lowry-Corry, Viscount Corry
111	Earl Castle Stewart	1800	Ireland	Andrew Stuart, 9th Earl Castle Stewart	73	2023	Thomas Stuart (first cousin)
112	Earl of Donoughmore	1800	Ireland	John Hely-Hutchinson, 9th Earl of Donoughmore	74	2025	Richard Hely-Hutchinson, Viscount Suirdale
113	Earl of Caledon	1800	Ireland	Nicholas Alexander, 7th Earl of Caledon	71	1980	Frederick Alexander, Viscount Alexander
114	Earl of Rosslyn	1801	United Kingdom	Peter St Clair-Erskine, 7th Earl of Rosslyn	68	1977	Jamie St Clair-Erskine, Lord Loughborough
115	Earl of Craven	1801	United Kingdom	Benjamin Craven, 9th Earl of Craven	37	1990	None
116	Earl of Onslow	1801	United Kingdom	Rupert Onslow, 8th Earl of Onslow	59	2011	Anthony Onslow (father's fourth cousin)
117	Earl of Romney	1801	United Kingdom	Julian Marsham, 8th Earl of Romney	78	2004	David Marsham, Viscount Marsham
118	Earl of Chichester	1801	United Kingdom	John Pelham, 9th Earl of Chichester	82	1944	Richard Pelham (second cousin)
119	Earl of Wilton	1801	United Kingdom	Julian Grosvenor, 9th Earl of Wilton	67	2026	Alexander Grosvenor (first cousin)
120	Earl of Limerick	1803 (Note: The Earl of Limerick was created after the Acts of Union 1800. It takes precedence after earlier Earldoms of the United Kingdom.)	Ireland	Edmund Pery, 7th Earl of Limerick	63	2003	Felix Pery, Viscount Glentworth
121	Earl of Clancarty	1803 (Note: The Earl of Clancarty was created after the Acts of Union 1800. It takes precedence after earlier Earldoms of the United Kingdom.)	Ireland	Nicholas Trench, 9th Earl of Clancarty	74	1995	None
122	Earl of Powis	1804	United Kingdom	John Herbert, 8th Earl of Powis	74	1993	Jonathan Herbert, Viscount Clive
123	Earl Nelson	1805	United Kingdom	Simon Nelson, 10th Earl Nelson	55	2009	Thomas Nelson, Viscount Merton
124	Earl of Gosford	1806 (Note: The Earl of Gosford was created after the Acts of Union 1800. It takes precedence after earlier Earldoms of the United Kingdom.)	Ireland	Charles Acheson, 7th Earl of Gosford	84	1966	Nicholas Acheson (first cousin)
125	Earl of Rosse	1806 (Note: The Earl of Rosse was created after the Acts of Union 1800. It takes precedence after earlier Earldoms of the United Kingdom.)	Ireland	Brendan Parsons, 7th Earl of Rosse	89	1979	Lawrence Parsons, Lord Oxmantown
126	Earl of Normanton	1806 (Note: The Earl of Normanton was created after the Acts of Union 1800. It takes precedence after earlier Earldoms of the United Kingdom.)	Ireland	James Agar, 7th Earl of Normanton	44	2019	Arthur Agar, Viscount Somerton
127	Earl Grey	1806	United Kingdom	Alexander Grey, 8th Earl Grey	57	2023	Alexander Grey, Viscount Howick
128	Earl of Lonsdale	1807	United Kingdom	William Lowther, 9th Earl of Lonsdale	69	2021	James Lowther (half-brother)
129	Earl of Harrowby	1809	United Kingdom	Conroy Ryder, 8th Earl of Harrowby	75	2007	Dudley Ryder, Viscount Sandon
130	Earl of Harewood	1812	United Kingdom	David Lascelles, 8th Earl of Harewood	75	2011	Alexander Lascelles, Viscount Lascelles
131	Earl of Minto	1813	United Kingdom	Timothy Elliot-Murray-Kynynmound, 7th Earl of Minto	72	2005	Gilbert Elliot-Murray-Kynynmound, Viscount Melgund
132	Earl Cathcart	1814	United Kingdom	Charles Cathcart, 7th Earl Cathcart	73	1999	Alan Cathcart, Lord Greenock
133	Earl of Verulam	1815	United Kingdom	John Grimston, 7th Earl of Verulam	75	1973	James Grimston, Viscount Grimston
134	Earl of Saint Germans	1815	United Kingdom	Albert Elliot, 11th Earl of Saint Germans	21	2016	Louis Eliot (uncle)
135	Earl of Morley	1815	United Kingdom	Mark Parker, 7th Earl of Morley	70	2015	Edward Parker (first cousin)
136	Earl of Bradford	1815	United Kingdom	Richard Bridgeman, 7th Earl of Bradford	79	1981	Alexander Bridgeman, Viscount Newport
137	Earl of Eldon	1821	United Kingdom	John Scott, 6th Earl of Eldon	64	2017	John Scott, Viscount Encombe
138	Earl Howe	1821	United Kingdom	Frederick Curzon, 7th Earl Howe	75	1984	Thomas Curzon, Viscount Curzon
139	Earl of Stradbroke	1821	United Kingdom	Keith Rous, 6th Earl of Stradbroke	89	1983	Robert Rous, Viscount Dunwich
140	Earl Temple of Stowe	1822	United Kingdom	James Grenville Temple-Gore-Langton, 9th Earl Temple of Stowe	71	2013	Robert Temple-Gore-Langton (brother)
141	Earl of Kilmorey	1822 (Note: The Earl of Kilmorey was created after the Acts of Union 1800. It takes precedence after earlier Earldoms of the United Kingdom.)	Ireland	Richard Needham, 6th Earl of Kilmorey	84	1977	Robert Needham, Viscount Newry and Mourne
142	Earl of Listowel	1822 (Note: The Earl of Listowel was created after the Acts of Union 1800. It takes precedence after earlier Earldoms of the United Kingdom.)	Ireland	Francis Hare, 6th Earl of Listowel	62	1997	Timothy Hare (brother)
143	Earl of Norbury	1827 (Note: The Earl of Norbury was created after the Acts of Union 1800. It takes precedence after earlier Earldoms of the United Kingdom.)	Ireland	Richard Graham-Toler, 7th Earl of Norbury	59	2000	None
144	Earl Cawdor	1827	United Kingdom	Colin Campbell, 7th Earl Cawdor	64	1993	James Campbell, Viscount Emlyn
145	Earl of Lichfield	1831	United Kingdom	Thomas Anson, 6th Earl of Lichfield	48	2005	Thomas Anson, Viscount Anson
146	Earl of Ranfurly	1831 (Note: The Earl of Ranfurly was created after the Acts of Union 1800. It takes precedence after earlier Earldoms of the United Kingdom.)	Ireland	Edward Knox, 8th Earl of Ranfurly	69	2018	Adam Knox, Viscount Northland
147	Earl of Durham	1833	United Kingdom	Edward Lambton, 7th Earl of Durham	65	2006	Frederick Lambton, Viscount Lambton
148	Earl Granville	1833	United Kingdom	Fergus Leveson-Gower, 6th Earl Granville	67	1996	Granville Leveson-Gower, Lord Leveson
149	Earl of Effingham	1837	United Kingdom	Edward Howard, 8th Earl of Effingham	55	2022	Frederick Henry Charles Howard, Lord Howard of Effingham
150	Earl of Ducie	1837	United Kingdom	David Moreton, 7th Earl of Ducie	75	1991	James Moreton, Lord Moreton
151	Earl of Yarborough	1837	United Kingdom	Charles Pelham, 8th Earl of Yarborough	62	1991	George Pelham, Lord Worsley
152	Earl of Leicester	1837	United Kingdom	Thomas Coke, 8th Earl of Leicester	61	2015	Edward Coke, Viscount Coke
153	Earl of Gainsborough	1841	United Kingdom	Anthony Noel, 6th Earl of Gainsborough	76	2009	Henry Noel, Viscount Campden
154	Earl of Strafford	1847	United Kingdom	William Byng, 9th Earl of Strafford	62	2016	Samuel Byng, Viscount Enfield
155	Earl of Cottenham	1850	United Kingdom	Mark Pepys, 9th Earl of Cottenham	43	2000	Charles Pepys, Viscount Crowhurst
156	Earl Cowley	1857	United Kingdom	Graham Wellesley, 8th Earl Cowley	61	2016	Henry Wellesley, Viscount Dangan
157	Earl of Dudley	1860	United Kingdom	David Ward, 5th Earl of Dudley	79	2013	Leander Ward (half-brother)
158	Earl Russell	1861	United Kingdom	John Russell, 7th Earl Russell	55	2014	None
159	Earl of Cromartie	1861	United Kingdom	John Mackenzie, 5th Earl of Cromartie	78	1989	Colin Mackenzie, Viscount Tarbat
160	Earl of Kimberley	1866	United Kingdom	John Wodehouse, 5th Earl of Kimberley	75	2002	David Wodehouse, Lord Wodehouse
161	Earl of Wharncliffe	1876	United Kingdom	Richard Montagu-Stuart-Wortley, 5th Earl of Wharncliffe	72–73	1987	Reed Montagu-Stuart-Wortley, Viscount Carlton
162	Earl Cairns	1878	United Kingdom	Simon Cairns, 6th Earl Cairns	87	1989	Hugh Cairns, Viscount Garmoyle
163	Earl of Lytton	1880	United Kingdom	John Lytton, 5th Earl of Lytton	76	1985	Philip Lytton, Viscount Knebworth
164	Earl of Selborne	1882	United Kingdom	William Palmer, 5th Earl of Selborne	55	2021	Alexander Palmer, Viscount Wolmer
165	Earl of Iddesleigh	1885	United Kingdom	John Northcote, 5th Earl of Iddesleigh	69	2004	Thomas Northcote, Viscount St Cyres
166	Earl of Cranbrook	1892	United Kingdom	John Gathorne-Hardy, 6th Earl of Cranbrook	57	2026	Angus Gathorne-Hardy (brother)
167	Earl of Cromer	1901	United Kingdom	Evelyn Baring, 4th Earl of Cromer	80	1991	Alexander Baring, Viscount Errington
168	Earl of Plymouth	1905	United Kingdom	Ivor Edward Other Windsor-Clive, 4th Earl of Plymouth	74	2018	Robert Other Ivor Windsor-Clive, Viscount Windsor
169	Earl of Liverpool	1905	United Kingdom	Edward Foljambe, 5th Earl of Liverpool	81	1969	Luke Foljambe, Viscount Hawkesbury
170	Earl Saint Aldwyn	1915	United Kingdom	Michael Hicks Beach, 3rd Earl Saint Aldwyn	76	1992	David Hicks Beach (brother)
171	Earl Beatty	1919	United Kingdom	David Beatty, 3rd Earl Beatty	79	1972	Sean Beatty, Viscount Borodale
172	Earl Haig	1919	United Kingdom	Alexander Haig, 3rd Earl Haig	65	2009	None
173	Earl of Iveagh	1919	United Kingdom	Edward Guinness, 4th Earl of Iveagh	57	1992	Arthur Guinness, Viscount Elveden
174	Earl of Balfour	1922	United Kingdom	Roderick Balfour, 5th Earl of Balfour	77	2003	Charles Balfour (brother)
175	Earl of Oxford and Asquith	1925	United Kingdom	Raymond Asquith, 3rd Earl of Oxford and Asquith	74	2011	Mark Asquith, Viscount Asquith
176	Earl Jellicoe	1925	United Kingdom	Patrick Jellicoe, 3rd Earl Jellicoe	76	2007	Nicholas Charles Joseph John Jellicoe (brother)
177	Earl of Inchcape	1929	United Kingdom	Peter Mackay, 4th Earl of Inchcape	83	1994	Fergus Mackay, Viscount Glenapp
178	Earl Peel	1929	United Kingdom	William Peel, 3rd Earl Peel	79	1969	Ashton Peel, Viscount Clanfield
179	Earl Baldwin of Bewdley	1937	United Kingdom	Benedict Baldwin, 5th Earl Baldwin of Bewdley	52	2010	James Baldwin (brother)
180	Earl of Halifax	1944	United Kingdom	Peter Wood, 3rd Earl of Halifax	82	1980	James Wood, Lord Irwin
181	Earl of Gowrie	1945	United Kingdom	Brer Ruthven, 3rd Earl of Gowrie	62	2021	Heathcote Ruthven, Viscount Ruthven of Canberra
182	Earl Lloyd George of Dwyfor	1945	United Kingdom	David Lloyd George, 4th Earl Lloyd George of Dwyfor	75	2010	William Lloyd George, Viscount Gwynedd
183	Earl Mountbatten of Burma	1947	United Kingdom	Norton Knatchbull, 3rd Earl Mountbatten of Burma	79	2017	Nicholas Knatchbull, Lord Brabourne
184	Earl Alexander of Tunis	1952	United Kingdom	Shane Alexander, 2nd Earl Alexander of Tunis	91	1969	Brian Alexander (brother)
185	Earl of Swinton	1955	United Kingdom	Mark Cunliffe-Lister, 4th Earl of Swinton	56	2001	William Cunliffe-Lister, Lord Masham
186	Earl Attlee	1955	United Kingdom	John Attlee, 3rd Earl Attlee	70	1991	None
187	Earl of Woolton	1956	United Kingdom	Simon Marquis, 3rd Earl of Woolton	68	1969	None
188	Earl of Snowdon	1961	United Kingdom	David Armstrong-Jones, 2nd Earl of Snowdon	64	2017	Charles Armstrong-Jones, Viscount Linley
189	Earl of Stockton	1984	United Kingdom	Alexander Macmillan, 2nd Earl of Stockton	83	1986	Daniel Macmillan, Viscount Macmillan of Ovenden

== See also ==
- British nobility
- List of earldoms
