= List of marquessates in the peerages of Britain and Ireland =

Peerages and baronetcies of Britain and Ireland
Extant	All
Dukes	Dukedoms
Marquesses	Marquessates
Earls	Earldoms
Viscounts	Viscountcies
Barons	Baronies
Baronets	Baronetcies

This article lists all marquessates, extant, extinct, dormant, abeyant, or forfeit, in the peerages of England, Scotland, Great Britain, Ireland, and the United Kingdom.

The title of Marquess of Dublin, which is perhaps best described as Anglo-Irish, was the first to be created, in 1385, but like the next few creations, the title was soon forfeit. The title of Marquess of Pembroke, created in 1532 by Henry VIII for Anne Boleyn, has the distinction of being the first English hereditary peerage granted to a woman in her own right (styled "Marchioness" in the patent). The English title Marquess of Winchester, created in 1551, is the earliest still extant, so is Premier Marquess of England. The title long remained less common, and on the evening of the Coronation of Queen Victoria in 1838, the Prime Minister Lord Melbourne explained to her (from her journals):

I spoke to Ld M. about the numbers of Peers present at the Coronation, & he said it was quite unprecedented. I observed that there were very few Viscounts, to which he replied "There are very few Viscounts," that they were an old sort of title & not really English; that they came from Vice-Comites; that Dukes & Barons were the only real English titles; — that Marquises were likewise not English, & that people were mere made Marquises, when it was not wished that they should be made Dukes.

== Marquessates in the Peerage of England, 1385–1707 ==
English marquessate	Creation	Surname	Current status (extant)	Notes
Dublin	1 December 1385	Vere	Resigned 13 October 1386	Created Duke of Ireland in 1386. Might be considered an Irish peerage. Creation for life only.
Dorset	29 September 1397	Beaufort	Deprived 6 October 1399	Also Marquess of Somerset
Somerset	29 September 1397	Beaufort	Deprived 6 October 1399	Also Marquess of Dorset
Dorset	24 June 1442	Beaufort	Forfeit 3 April 1464	Created Duke of Somerset in 1448; also forfeit 1461–1463.
Suffolk	14 September 1444	de la Pole	Surrendered title 26 February 1493	Created Duke of Suffolk in 1448.
Montagu	25 March 1470	Neville	Forfeit 14 April 1471	
Dorset	18 April 1475	Grey	Forfeit 23 February 1554	Forfeit between 1483 and 1485; created Duke of Suffolk in 1551.
Berkeley	28 January 1489	Berkeley	Extinct 14 February 1492	
Exeter	18 June 1525	Courtenay	Forfeit 9 January 1539	
Pembroke	1 September 1532	Boleyn	Forfeit 19 May 1536	holder was also queen consort from 1533 to 1536
Northampton	16 February 1547	Parr	Extinct 28 October 1571	Forfeit 1554–13 January 1559
Winchester	11 October 1551	Paulet	Extant	Created Duke of Bolton in 1689, that title extinct 1794.
Buckingham	1 January 1618	Villiers	Extinct 16 April 1687	Created Duke of Buckingham in 1623.
Hertford	3 June 1641	Seymour	Extinct 29 April 1675	Restored to Dukedom of Somerset in 1660
Worcester	2 March 1643	Somerset	Extant	Created Duke of Beaufort in 1682.
Newcastle-upon-Tyne	27 October 1643	Cavendish	Extinct 26 July 1691	Created Duke of Newcastle-upon-Tyne in 1665.
Dorchester	25 March 1645	Pierrepont	Extinct 8 December 1680	
Halifax	17 August 1682	Saville	Extinct 31 August 1700	
Powis	24 March 1687	Herbert	Extinct 8 March 1748	
Carmarthen	9 April 1689	Osborne	Extinct 20 March 1964	Created Duke of Leeds in 1694.
Harwich	10 April 1689	Schomberg	Extinct 5 July 1719	Subsidiary title of the Duke of Schomberg; also Duke of Leinster in Ireland from 1693
Alton	30 April 1694	Talbot	Extinct 1 February 1718	Subsidiary title of the Duke of Shrewsbury
Normanby	10 May 1694	Sheffield	Extinct 30 October 1735	Created Duke of Buckingham and Normanby in 1703.
Tavistock	11 May 1694	Russell	Extant	Subsidiary title of the Duke of Bedford
Hartington	12 May 1694	Cavendish	Extant	Subsidiary title of the Duke of Devonshire
Clare	14 May 1694	Holles	Extinct 15 July 1711	Subsidiary title of the Duke of Newcastle
Blandford	14 December 1702	Churchill	Extant	Subsidiary title of the Duke of Marlborough
Granby	29 March 1703	Manners	Extant	Subsidiary title of the Duke of Rutland
Monthermer	14 April 1705	Montagu	Extinct 1749	Subsidiary title of the Duke of Montagu
Cambridge	9 November 1706	Guelph	Merged in crown 11 June 1727	Subsidiary title of the Duke of Cambridge; also Prince of Wales, Duke of Cornwall, and Duke of Rothesay from 1714
Kent	14 November 1706	Grey	Extinct 5 June 1740	Created Duke of Kent in 1710; created Marquess Grey in 1740.
Lindsey	21 December 1706	Bertie	Extinct 8 February 1809	Created Duke of Ancaster and Kesteven in 1715.
Dorchester	23 December 1706	Pierrepont	Extinct 23 September 1773	Created Duke of Kingston-upon-Hull in 1715.

== Marquessates in the Peerage of Scotland, 1488–1707 ==
Scottish marquessate	Creation	Surname	Current status (extant)	Notes
Ormonde	28 January 1488	Stewart	Extinct 17 January 1504	Subsidiary title of the Duke of Ross
Fife	12 May 1567	Hepburn	Forfeit 29 December 1567	Subsidiary title of the Duke of Orkney
Hamilton	17 April 1599	Hamilton	Extinct 12 September 1651	Created Duke of Hamilton in 1643.
Huntly	17 April 1599	Gordon	Extant	Created Duke of Gordon in 1684, which title became extinct in 1836, but reclaimed in 1838.
Ormonde	23 December 1600	Stewart	Merged in crown 27 March 1625	Subsidiary title of the Duke of Albany; created Duke of York in England in 1605; also Prince of Wales, Duke of Cornwall, and Duke of Rothesay from 1612
Wigtown	2 May 1602	Stewart	Extinct 27 May 1602	Subsidiary title of the Duke of Kintyre and Lorne
Douglas	14 June 1633	Douglas	Extant	Created Duke of Douglas in 1703, which title became extinct in 1761; also Duke of Hamilton and Duke of Brandon from 1761.
Argyll	15 November 1641	Campbell	Forfeit 27 May 1661	
Clydesdale	12 April 1643	Hamilton	Extant	Subsidiary title of the Duke of Hamilton
Montrose	6 May 1644	Graham	Extant	Created Duke of Montrose in 1707.
March	1 May 1672	Maitland	Extinct 24 August 1682	Subsidiary title of the Duke of Lauderdale
Atholl	17 February 1676	Murray	Extant	Created Duke of Atholl in 1703.
Bambreich	29 May 1680	Leslie	Extinct 27 July 1681	Subsidiary title of the Duke of Rothes
Queensberry	11 February 1682	Douglas	Extant	Created Duke of Queensberry in 1684. The titles were separated from 1711 to 1715 and again after 1810.
Dumfriesshire	3 November 1684	Douglas	Extant	Subsidiary title of the Duke of Queensberry; also Marquess of Queensberry 1684–1711 and 1715–1810; also Duke of Buccleuch from 1810
Tweeddale	17 December 1694	Hay	Extant	
Kintyre and Lorne	23 June 1701	Campbell	Extant	Subsidiary title of the Duke of Argyll; created Duke of Greenwich in Great Britain 1719–1743; created Duke of Argyll in the United Kingdom in 1892
Lothian	23 June 1701	Kerr	Extant	
Annandale	24 June 1701	Johnston/Johnstone/Vanden Bempde	Dormant 29 April 1792	
Angus and Abernethy	10 April 1703	Douglas	Extinct 21 July 1761	Subsidiary title of the Duke of Douglas
Tullibardine	30 June 1703	Murray	Extant	Subsidiary title of the Duke of Atholl; also Marquess of Atholl
Graham and Buchanan	24 April 1707	Graham	Extant	Subsidiary title of the Duke of Montrose
Bowmont and Cessford	25 April 1707	Ker	Extant	Subsidiary title of the Duke of Roxburghe

== Marquessates in the Peerage of Great Britain, 1707–1801 ==
Great Britain marquessate	Creation	Surname	Current status (extant)	Notes
Beverley	26 May 1708	Douglas	Extinct 22 October 1778	Subsidiary title of the Duke of Dover, who was also Duke of Queensberry and Marquess of Dumfriesshire in the Peerage of Scotland; also Marquess of Queensberry 1708–1711 and 1715–1778
Wharton	15 February 1715	Wharton	Extinct 31 May 1731	Also Marquess of Malmesbury and Marquess of Catherlough in Ireland. Created Duke of Wharton in 1718.
Malmesbury	15 February 1715	Wharton	Extinct 31 May 1731	Also Marquess of Wharton and Marquess of Catherlough in Ireland. Created Duke of Wharton in 1718.
Clare	11 August 1715	Pelham-Holles	Extinct 1768	Subsidiary title of the Duke of Newcastle-upon-Tyne
Titchfield	6 July 1716	Bentinck	Extinct 30 July 1990	Subsidiary title of the Duke of Portland
Carnarvon	29 April 1719	Brydges	Extinct 29 September 1789	Subsidiary title of the Duke of Chandos
Brackley	18 June 1720	Egerton	Extinct 8 March 1803	Subsidiary title of the Duke of Bridgewater
the Isle of Ely	26 July 1726	Guelph	Merged in crown 25 October 1760	Subsidiary title of the Duke of Edinburgh; also Prince of Wales from 1727; also Duke of Cornwall in England and Duke of Rothesay in Scotland 1727–1751. The marquessate was apparently erroneously gazetted as Marquess of the Isle of Wight although Marquess of the Isle of Ely was the intended title. In later editions of The London Gazette the Duke is referred to as the Marquess of the Isle of Ely.
Berkhampstead	27 July 1726	Guelph	Extinct 31 October 1765	Subsidiary title of the Duke of Cumberland
Grey	19 May 1740	Grey	Extinct 19 January 1797	Also Duke of Kent until 1740, when this title became extinct; passed by special patent to his granddaughter
Rockingham	19 April 1746	Watson-Wentworth	Extinct 2 July 1782	
Monthermer	5 November 1766	Montagu	Extinct 23 May 1790	Subsidiary title of the Duke of Montagu
Buckingham	4 December 1784	Temple-Nugent-Grenville	Extinct 26 March 1889	Created Duke of Buckingham and Chandos in 1822.
Lansdowne	6 December 1784	Petty-Fitzmaurice	Extant	
Stafford	1 March 1786	Leveson-Gower	Extant	Created Duke of Sutherland in 1833.
Townshend	31 October 1787	Townshend	Extant	
Salisbury	18 August 1789	Cecil	Extant	
Bath	24 August 1789	Thynne	Extant	
Abercorn	15 October 1790	Hamilton	Extant	Created Duke of Abercorn in Ireland in 1868.
Cornwallis	8 October 1792	Cornwallis	Extinct 9 August 1823	
Hertford	5 July 1793	Seymour-Conway	Extant	
Bute	21 March 1796	Stuart	Extant	

== Marquessates in the Peerage of Ireland, 1642–1825 ==
Irish marquessate	Creation	Surname	Current status (extant)	Notes
Ormonde	30 August 1642	Butler	Extinct 17 December 1758	Created Duke of Ormonde in 1661 and Duke of Ormonde in England in 1682, the English Dukedom being attainted in 1715; title was not used by the third duke 1745–1758.
Antrim	26 January 1645	MacDonnell	Extinct 3 February 1682	
Clanricarde	21 February 1646	Burke	Extinct July 1657	
Catherlough	7 January 1715	Wharton	Extinct 31 May 1731	Created Marquess of Wharton and Marquess of Malmesbury in Great Britain later in 1715. Created Duke of Wharton in 1718.
Dungannon ("Marchioness")	18 July 1716	Schulenberg	Extinct 10 May 1743	Subsidiary title of the Duchess of Munster; created Duchess of Kendal in Great Britain in 1719; peerage for life only
Kildare	3 March 1761	FitzGerald	Extant	Created Duke of Leinster in 1766.
Clanricarde	17 August 1789	de Burgh-Canning	Extinct 8 December 1797	
Antrim	18 August 1789	MacDonnell	Extinct 29 July 1791	
Waterford	19 August 1789	Beresford	Extant	
Downshire	20 August 1789	Hill	Extant	
Donegall	27 June 1791	Chichester	Extant	
Drogheda	5 July 1791	Moore	Extinct 29 June 1892	
Wellesley	2 December 1799	Wellesley	Extinct 26 September 1842	
Headfort	29 December 1800	Taylour	Extant	
Sligo	29 December 1800	Browne	Extant	
Thomond	29 December 1800	O'Brien	Extinct 3 July 1855	
Ely	29 December 1800	Tottenham	Extant	
Londonderry	13 January 1816	Stewart	Extant	
Conyngham	22 January 1816	Conyngham	Extant	
Ormonde	22 January 1816	Butler	Extinct 10 August 1820	
Westmeath	12 January 1822	Nugent	Extinct 5 May 1871	
Ormonde	5 October 1825	Butler	Extinct 25 October 1997	
Clanricarde	26 November 1825	de Burgh-Canning	Extinct 12 April 1916	
Hamilton	10 August 1868	Hamilton	Extant	Subsidiary title of the Duke of Abercorn; also Marquess of Abercorn in Great Britain

== Marquessates in the Peerage of the United Kingdom, 1801–present ==
United Kingdom marquessate	Creation	Surname	Current status (extant)	Notes
Exeter	4 February 1801	Cecil	Extant	
Northampton	7 September 1812	Compton	Extant	
Camden	7 September 1812	Pratt	Extant	
Wellington	3 October 1812	Wellesley	Extant	Created Duke of Wellington in 1814.
Douro	11 May 1814	Wellesley	Extant	Subsidiary title of the Duke of Wellington
Anglesey	4 July 1815	Paget	Extant	
Cholmondeley	22 November 1815	Cholmondeley	Extant	
Hastings	13 February 1817	Rawdon-Hastings	Extinct 10 November 1868	
Ailesbury	17 July 1821	Brudenell-Bruce	Extant	
Chandos	4 February 1822	Temple-Nugent-Brydges-Chandos-Grenville	Extinct 26 March 1889	Subsidiary title of the Duke of Buckingham and Chandos
Bristol	30 June 1826	Hervey	Extant	
Cleveland	5 October 1827	Vane	Extinct 21 August 1891	Created Duke of Cleveland in 1833.
Ailsa	10 September 1831	Kennedy	Extant	
Breadalbane	12 September 1831	Campbell	Extinct 8 November 1862	
Westminster	13 September 1831	Grosvenor	Extant	Created Duke of Westminster in 1874.
Normanby	25 June 1838	Phipps	Extant	
Dalhousie	25 August 1849	Broun-Ramsay	Extinct 19 December 1860	
Ripon	23 June 1871	Robinson	Extinct 22 September 1923	
Abergavenny	14 January 1876	Neville	Extant	
Breadalbane	11 July 1885	Campbell	Extinct 19 October 1922	
Dufferin and Ava	17 November 1888	Hamilton-Temple-Blackwood	Extinct 29 May 1988	
Macduff	29 July 1889	Duff	Extinct 29 January 1912	Subsidiary title of the Duke of Fife (1889 creation); also Duke of Fife from 1900
Zetland	22 August 1892	Dundas	Extant	
Linlithgow	27 October 1902	Hope	Extant	
Crewe	3 July 1911	Crewe-Milnes	Extinct 20 June 1945	
Lincolnshire	26 February 1912	Wynn-Carrington	Extinct 13 June 1928	
Aberdeen and Temair	4 January 1916	Hamilton-Gordon, later Gordon	Extant	
Cambridge	16 July 1917	Cambridge	Extinct 16 April 1981	
Milford Haven	17 July 1917	Mountbatten	Extant	
Carisbrooke	18 July 1917	Mountbatten	Extinct 23 February 1960	
Curzon of Kedleston	28 June 1921	Curzon	Extinct 20 March 1925	
Reading	7 May 1926	Isaacs, later Rufus Isaacs	Extant	
Willingdon	26 May 1936	Freeman-Thomas	Extinct 19 March 1979	

== See also ==
- British nobility
- Marquesses in the United Kingdom
- List of marquesses in the peerages of Britain and Ireland
