= List of viscounts in the peerages of Britain and Ireland =

Peerages and baronetcies of Britain and Ireland
Extant	All
Dukes	Dukedoms
Marquesses	Marquessates
Earls	Earldoms
Viscounts	Viscountcies
Barons	Baronies
Baronets	Baronetcies

This is a list of the 107 present and extant Viscounts in the Peerages of England, Scotland, Great Britain, Ireland, and the United Kingdom. Note that it does not include extant viscountcies which have become merged (either through marriage or elevation) with higher peerages and are today in use only as subsidiary titles. For a more complete list, which adds these "hidden" viscounties as well as extinct, dormant, abeyant, and forfeit ones, see List of Viscountcies.

== Order of precedence ==
Heraldic representation of the Coronet of a British Viscount

The general order of precedence among Viscounts is:

1. Viscounts in the Peerage of England
2. Viscounts in the Peerage of Scotland
3. Viscounts in the Peerage of Great Britain
4. Viscounts in the Peerage of Ireland created before 1801
5. Viscounts in the Peerage of the United Kingdom and Viscounts in the Peerage of Ireland created after 1801

== Viscounts in the Peerages of Britain and Ireland ==
#	Title	Created	Peerage	Current			
#	Title	Created	Peerage	Viscount	Age	Acceded	Heir Apparent Presumptive
1	Viscount Hereford	1550	England	Robin Devereux, 19th Viscount Hereford	51	2004	Henry Walter de Bohun Devereux
2	Viscount Falkland	1620	Scotland	Lucius Cary, 15th Viscount Falkland	91	1984	Lucius Alexander Plantagenet Cary, Master of Falkland
3	Viscount Arbuthnott	1641	Scotland	Keith Arbuthnott, 17th Viscount of Arbuthnott	76	2012	Christopher Keith Arbuthnott, Master of Arbuthnott
4	Viscount Oxfuird	1651	Scotland	Ian Makgill, 14th Viscount of Oxfuird	56	2003	Max George Samuel Makgill, Master of Oxfuird
5	Viscount Bolingbroke	1712	Great Britain	Nicholas St John, 9th Viscount Bolingbroke	52	2011	Walter St John
5	Viscount St. John	1716	Great Britain	Nicholas St John, 9th Viscount Bolingbroke	52	2011	Walter St John
6	Viscount Cobham	1718	Great Britain	Christopher Lyttelton, 12th Viscount Cobham	78	2006	Oliver Christopher Lyttelton
7	Viscount Falmouth	1720	Great Britain	Evelyn Boscawen, 10th Viscount Falmouth	71	2022	Evelyn George William Boscawen
8	Viscount Torrington	1721	Great Britain	Timothy Byng, 11th Viscount Torrington	83	1961	Colin Hugh Cranmer-Byng (fifth cousin)
9	Viscount Hood	1796	Great Britain	Henry Hood, 8th Viscount Hood	68	1999	Archibald Lyttelton Samuel Hood
10	Viscount Gormanston	1478	Ireland	Nicholas Preston, 17th Viscount Gormanston	86	1940	Jenico Francis Tara Preston
11	Viscount Mountgarret	1550	Ireland	Piers Butler, 18th Viscount Mountgarret	65	2015	Theo Oliver Stafford Butler
12	Viscount Valentia	1622	Ireland	Francis Annesley, 16th Viscount Valentia	66	2005	Peter John Annesley (brother)
13	Viscount Dillon	1622	Ireland	Henry Dillon, 22nd Viscount Dillon	53	1982	Francis Charles Robert Dillon
14	Viscount Massereene	1661	Ireland	Charles Skeffington, 15th Viscount Massereene	53	2024	James Algernon Foster Clotworthy Skeffington
14	Viscount Ferrard	1797	Ireland	Charles Skeffington, 15th Viscount Massereene	53	2024	James Algernon Foster Clotworthy Skeffington
15	Viscount Charlemont	1665	Ireland	John Caulfeild, 15th Viscount Charlemont	60	1966	Shane Andrew Caulfeild
16	Viscount Downe	1680	Ireland	Richard Dawnay, 12th Viscount Downe	59	2002	Thomas Payan Dawnay (cousin)
17	Viscount Molesworth	1716	Ireland	Robert Molesworth, 12th Viscount Molesworth	67	1997	William John Charles Molesworth (brother)
18	Viscount Chetwynd	1717	Ireland	Adam Chetwynd, 11th Viscount Chetwynd	57	2001	Connor Adam Chetwynd
19	Viscount Midleton	1717	Ireland	Alan Brodrick, 12th Viscount Midleton	77	1988	Ashley Rupert Brodrick
20	Viscount Boyne	1717	Ireland	Gustavus Hamilton-Russell, 11th Viscount Boyne	61	1995	Gustavus Archie Edward Hamilton-Russell
21	Viscount Gage	1720	Ireland	Nicolas Gage, 8th Viscount Gage	92	1993	Henry William Gage
22	Viscount Galway	1727	Ireland	Philip Monckton, 13th Viscount Galway	74	2017	Piers Alastair Carlos Monckton
23	Viscount Powerscourt	1744	Ireland	Anthony Wingfield, 11th Viscount Powerscourt	63	2015	Richard David Noel Wingfield (fifth cousin once removed)
24	Viscount Ashbrook	1751	Ireland	Michael Flower, 11th Viscount Ashbrook	90	1995	Rowland Francis Warburton Flower
25	Viscount Southwell	1776	Ireland	Richard Southwell, 8th Viscount Southwell	70	2019	Charles Anthony John Southwell (brother)
26	Viscount de Vesci	1776	Ireland	Thomas Vesey, 7th Viscount de Vesci	71	1983	Oliver Ivo Vesey
27	Viscount Lifford	1781	Ireland	Edward Hewitt, 9th Viscount Lifford	77	1987	James Thomas Wingfield Hewitt
28	Viscount Bangor	1781	Ireland	William Ward, 8th Viscount Bangor	78	1993	Edward Nicholas Ward (half-brother)
29	Viscount Doneraile	1785	Ireland	Richard St Leger, 10th Viscount Doneraile	80	1983	Nathaniel Warham Robert St John St Leger
30	Viscount Harberton	1791	Ireland	Henry Pomeroy, 11th Viscount Harberton	68	2020	Arthur Pocius
31	Viscount Hawarden	1793	Ireland	Robert Maude, 9th Viscount Hawarden	65	1991	Varian John Connon Eustace Maude
32	Viscount Monck	1801 (Note: The Viscount Monck was created after the Acts of Union 1800. It takes precedence after earlier Viscountcies of the United Kingdom.)	Ireland	Charles Monck, 7th Viscount Monck	73	1982	George Stanley Monck (brother)
33	Viscount St Vincent	1801	United Kingdom	Edward Jervis, 8th Viscount St Vincent	43–44	2023	Ronald Nigel John Jervis (uncle)
34	Viscount Melville	1802	United Kingdom	Robert Dundas, 10th Viscount Melville	42	2011	Max David Henry Dundas
35	Viscount Sidmouth	1805	United Kingdom	Jeremy Francis Addington, 8th Viscount Sidmouth	79	2005	John Addington
36	Viscount Gort	1816 (Note: The Viscount Gort was created after the Acts of Union 1800. It takes precedence after earlier Viscountcies of the United Kingdom.)	Ireland	Foley Robert Standish Prendergast Vereker, 9th Viscount Gort	74	1995	Robert Foley Prendergast Vereker
37	Viscount Exmouth	1816	United Kingdom	Edward Pellew, 11th Viscount Exmouth	47	2026	Leo Pellew
38	Viscount Combermere	1827	United Kingdom	Thomas Stapleton-Cotton, 6th Viscount Combermere	57	2000	Laszlo Michael Wellington Stapleton-Cotton
39	Viscount Hill	1842	United Kingdom	David Clegg-Hill, 9th Viscount Hill	81	2003	Michael Charles David Clegg-Hill
40	Viscount Hardinge	1846	United Kingdom	Andrew Hardinge, 7th Viscount Hardinge	33	2014	Jamie Alexander David Hardinge (brother)
41	Viscount Bridport	1868	United Kingdom	Alexander Hood, 4th Viscount Bridport	78	1969	Peregrine Alexander Nelson Hood
42	Viscount Portman	1873	United Kingdom	Christopher Portman, 10th Viscount Portman	68	1999	Luke Henry Oliver Richard Berkeley Portman
43	Viscount Hampden	1884	United Kingdom	Francis Brand, 7th Viscount Hampden	56	2008	Lucian Anthony Brand
44	Viscount Hambleden	1891	United Kingdom	Henry Smith, 5th Viscount Hambleden	70	2012	Bernardo James Smith (brother)
45	Viscount Knutsford	1895	United Kingdom	Henry Holland-Hibbert, 7th Viscount Knutsford	67	2025	Thomas Arthur Holland-Hibbert
46	Viscount Esher	1897	United Kingdom	Christopher Brett, 5th Viscount Esher	89	2004	Matthew Christopher Anthony Brett
47	Viscount Goschen	1900	United Kingdom	Giles Goschen, 4th Viscount Goschen	60	1977	Alexander John Edward Goschen
48	Viscount Ridley	1900	United Kingdom	Matthew Ridley, 5th Viscount Ridley	68	2012	Matthew White Ridley
49	Viscount Colville of Culross	1902	United Kingdom	Charles Colville, 5th Viscount Colville of Culross	67	2010	Richmond James Innys Colville (brother)
50	Viscount Selby	1905	United Kingdom	Christopher Rolf Thomas Gully, 6th Viscount Selby	33	2001	James Edward Hugh Grey Gully (great-uncle)
51	Viscount Knollys	1911	United Kingdom	Patrick Knollys, 4th Viscount Knollys	64	2023	Alexander Knollys
52	Viscount Allendale	1911	United Kingdom	Wentworth Beaumont, 4th Viscount Allendale	78	2002	Wentworth Ambrose Ismay Beaumont
53	Viscount Chilston	1911	United Kingdom	Alastair Akers-Douglas, 4th Viscount Chilston	80	1982	Oliver Ian Akers-Douglas
54	Viscount Scarsdale	1911	United Kingdom	Peter Curzon, 4th Viscount Scarsdale	77	2000	David James Nathaniel Curzon (brother)
55	Viscount Mersey	1916	United Kingdom	Edward John Hallam Bigham, 5th Viscount Mersey	60	2006	Charles Richard Petty Bigham (cousin)
56	Viscount Cowdray	1917	United Kingdom	Michael Pearson, 4th Viscount Cowdray	82	1995	Peregrine John Dickinson Pearson
57	Viscount Devonport	1917	United Kingdom	Terence Kearley, 3rd Viscount Devonport	82	1973	David Hudson Kearley Mezquida (first cousin once removed)
58	Viscount Astor	1917	United Kingdom	William Astor, 4th Viscount Astor	74	1966	William Waldorf Astor
59	Viscount Wimborne	1918	United Kingdom	Ivor Guest, 4th Viscount Wimborne	58	1993	Ivor N.G.I. Guest
60	Viscount St Davids	1918	United Kingdom	Rhodri Philipps, 4th Viscount St Davids	60	2009	Roland Augusto Jestyn Estanislao Philipps (brother)
61	Viscount Rothermere	1919	United Kingdom	Jonathan Harmsworth, 4th Viscount Rothermere	58	1998	Vere Richard Jonathan Harold Harmsworth
62	Viscount Allenby	1919	United Kingdom	Henry Allenby, 4th Viscount Allenby	58	2014	Harry Michael Edmund Allenby
63	Viscount Chelmsford	1921	United Kingdom	Frederic Thesiger, 4th Viscount Chelmsford	64	1999	Frederic Thesiger
64	Viscount Long	1921	United Kingdom	James Long, 5th Viscount Long	65	2017	None
65	Viscount Ullswater	1921	United Kingdom	Nicholas Lowther, 2nd Viscount Ullswater	84	1949	Benjamin James Lowther
66	Viscount Younger of Leckie	1923	United Kingdom	James Younger, 5th Viscount Younger of Leckie	70	2003	Alexander William George Younger
67	Viscount Bearsted	1925	United Kingdom	Nicholas Samuel, 5th Viscount Bearsted	76	1996	Harry Richard Samuel
68	Viscount Bridgeman	1929	United Kingdom	Luke Bridgeman, 4th Viscount Bridgeman	55	2026	Valentine Henry Ralph Orlando Bridgeman (born 1999)
69	Viscount Hailsham	1929	United Kingdom	Douglas Hogg, 3rd Viscount Hailsham	81	2001	Quintin John Neil Martin Hogg
70	Viscount Brentford	1929	United Kingdom	Crispin Joynson-Hicks, 4th Viscount Brentford	93	1983	Paul William Joynson-Hicks
71	Viscount Buckmaster	1932	United Kingdom	Adrian Buckmaster, 4th Viscount Buckmaster	77	2007	Rupert Stanley Buckmaster
72	Viscount Bledisloe	1935	United Kingdom	Rupert Bathurst, 4th Viscount Bledisloe	62	2009	Benjamin Bathurst
73	Viscount Hanworth	1936	United Kingdom	David Pollock, 3rd Viscount Hanworth	80	1996	Harold William Charles Pollock (nephew)
74	Viscount Trenchard	1936	United Kingdom	Hugh Trenchard, 3rd Viscount Trenchard	75	1987	Alexander Thomas Trenchard
75	Viscount Samuel	1937	United Kingdom	Jonathan Samuel, 5th Viscount Samuel	60	2014	Benjamin Angus Samuel (half-brother)
76	Viscount Runciman of Doxford	1937	United Kingdom	David Runciman, 4th Viscount Runciman of Doxford	59	2020	Thomas Runciman
77	Viscount Davidson	1937	United Kingdom	Nicolas Davidson, 4th Viscount Davidson	54–55	2019	None
78	Viscount Weir	1938	United Kingdom	William Weir, 3rd Viscount Weir	92	1975	James William Hartland Weir
79	Viscount Caldecote	1939	United Kingdom	Piers Inskip, 3rd Viscount Caldecote	79	1999	Thomas James Inskip
80	Viscount Camrose	1941	United Kingdom	Jonathan Berry, 5th Viscount Camrose	56	2016	Hugo William Berry
81	Viscount Stansgate	1942	United Kingdom	Stephen Benn, 3rd Viscount Stansgate	75	2014	Daniel John Wedgwood Benn
82	Viscount Margesson	1942	United Kingdom	Richard Margesson, 3rd Viscount Margesson	65	2014	None
83	Viscount Daventry	1943	United Kingdom	James FitzRoy Newdegate, 4th Viscount Daventry	66	2000	Humphrey John FitzRoy Newdegate
84	Viscount Addison	1945	United Kingdom	William Addison, 4th Viscount Addison	81	1992	Paul Wand Addison
85	Viscount Kemsley	1945	United Kingdom	Richard Berry, 3rd Viscount Kemsley	75	1999	Luke Gomer Berry
86	Viscount Marchwood	1945	United Kingdom	Peter Penny, 4th Viscount Marchwood	61	2022	Christopher (Kit) David George Penny
87	Viscount Montgomery of Alamein	1946	United Kingdom	Henry Montgomery, 3rd Viscount Montgomery of Alamein	72	2020	None
88	Viscount Waverley	1952	United Kingdom	John Anderson, 3rd Viscount Waverley	76	1990	Forbes Alastair Rupert Anderson
89	Viscount Thurso	1952	United Kingdom	John Sinclair, 3rd Viscount Thurso	73	1995	James Alexander Robin Sinclair
90	Viscount Brookeborough	1952	United Kingdom	Alan Brooke, 3rd Viscount Brookeborough	74	1987	Christopher Arthur Brooke (brother)
91	Viscount Norwich	1952	United Kingdom	Jason Cooper, 3rd Viscount Norwich	66	2018	None
92	Viscount Leathers	1954	United Kingdom	Christopher Leathers, 3rd Viscount Leathers	85	1996	James Frederick Leathers
93	Viscount Soulbury	1954	United Kingdom	Oliver Ramsbotham, 4th Viscount Soulbury	82	2010	(Edward) Herwald Ramsbotham
94	Viscount Chandos	1954	United Kingdom	Thomas Lyttelton, 3rd Viscount Chandos	73	1980	Oliver Antony Lyttelton
95	Viscount De L'Isle	1956	United Kingdom	Philip Sidney, 2nd Viscount De L'Isle	81	1991	Philip William Edmund Sidney
96	Viscount Monckton of Brenchley	1957	United Kingdom	Christopher Monckton, 3rd Viscount Monckton of Brenchley	74	2006	Timothy David Robert Monckton (brother)
97	Viscount Tenby	1957	United Kingdom	Timothy Lloyd George, 4th Viscount Tenby	64	2023	None
98	Viscount Mackintosh of Halifax	1957	United Kingdom	Clive Mackintosh, 3rd Viscount Mackintosh of Halifax	68	1980	Thomas Harold George Mackintosh
99	Viscount Dunrossil	1959	United Kingdom	Andrew Morrison, 3rd Viscount Dunrossil	72	2000	Callum Alasdair Brundage Morrison
100	Viscount Rochdale	1960	United Kingdom	Jonathan Kemp, 3rd Viscount Rochdale	65	2015	George Thomas Kemp (nephew)
101	Viscount Slim	1960	United Kingdom	Mark Slim, 3rd Viscount Slim	66	2019	Rufus William Slim
102	Viscount Head	1960	United Kingdom	Richard Head, 2nd Viscount Head	89	1983	Henry Julian Head
103	Viscount Boyd of Merton	1960	United Kingdom	Simon Lennox-Boyd, 2nd Viscount Boyd of Merton	86	1983	Benjamin Alan Lennox-Boyd
104	Viscount Mills	1962	United Kingdom	Christopher Mills, 3rd Viscount Mills	70	1988	None
105	Viscount Blakenham	1963	United Kingdom	Casper John Hare, 3rd Viscount Blakenham	54	2018	Inigo Hare
106	Viscount Eccles	1964	United Kingdom	John Eccles, 2nd Viscount Eccles	95	1999	William David Eccles
107	Viscount Dilhorne	1964	United Kingdom	James Manningham-Buller, 3rd Viscount Dilhorne	70	2022	Edward John Manningham-Buller

== See also ==
- British nobility
- List of viscountcies in the peerages of Britain and Ireland
