= List of dukes in the peerages of Britain and Ireland =

Peerages and baronetcies of Britain and Ireland
Extant	All
Dukes	Dukedoms
Marquesses	Marquessates
Earls	Earldoms
Viscounts	Viscountcies
Barons	Baronies
Baronets	Baronetcies

This is a list of the 30 present dukes in the peerages of the Kingdom of England, Kingdom of Scotland, Kingdom of Great Britain, Kingdom of Ireland, United Kingdom of Great Britain and Ireland, and the United Kingdom of Great Britain and Northern Ireland 1927 and after. For a more complete historical listing, including extinct, dormant, abeyant, forfeit dukedoms in addition to these extant ones, see List of dukedoms in the peerages of Britain and Ireland.

== History ==
In the Peerage of England, the title of duke was created 74 times (using 40 different titles: the rest were recreations). Out of the 74 times, 37 titles are now extinct (including the two women's), 16 titles were forfeit or surrendered, 10 were merged with the Crown, and 11 are extant (see list below). The first, Cornwall, is a title that automatically goes to the heir apparent (if and only if he is also the eldest living son of the Sovereign). One of the duchies that was merged into the Crown, Lancaster, still provides income to the sovereign. All but three of the non-royal ducal titles which became extinct did so before the 20th century (the Duke of Leeds became extinct in 1964, the Duke of Newcastle in 1988, and the Duke of Portland in 1990). The last English dukedom to be forfeit became so in 1715. The last British dukedom to become extinct was the title of Duke of Portland in 1990.

Three times a woman was created a duchess in her own right: Barbara Palmer, 1st Duchess of Cleveland, chief mistress of Charles II of England; Anne Scott, 1st Duchess of Buccleuch, wife of Charles II's eldest illegitimate son, the Duke of Monmouth; and Cecilia Underwood, Duchess of Inverness, wife of Prince Augustus Frederick, Duke of Sussex, whose marriage was in contravention of the Royal Marriages Act 1772 and therefore she was not allowed to share her husband's rank. In addition, the Dukedom of Marlborough was once inherited by a woman, the 2nd Duchess of Marlborough, through a special remainder, as happened to the Dukedom of Hamilton when it was inherited by Anne Hamilton, 3rd Duchess of Hamilton and also the royal Dukedom of Fife, which was created for the Earl Fife by Queen Victoria, on the occasion of his marriage to Louise, Princess Royal (eldest daughter of the future King Edward VII). A second dukedom of Fife was created in 1900 that could pass through the female line; this was eventually inherited by Princess Alexandra, 2nd Duchess of Fife.

The oldest six titles—each created between 1337 and 1386—were Duke of Cornwall (1337), Duke of Lancaster (1351), Duke of Clarence (1362), Duke of York (1385), Duke of Gloucester (1385), and Duke of Ireland (1386). The Duke of Ireland was a title used for only two years and is somewhat confusing since only a small portion of Ireland was really under the control of England in 1386; it is not to be confused with the dukedoms of the Peerage of Ireland. Clarence has not been used since 1478, when George (the brother of Edward IV) was executed for treason. (However, Clarence has since been used as half of a double title, most recently until 1892 when Victoria's grandson (and son of the Prince of Wales), the Duke of Clarence and Avondale, died at the age of 28.) The titles of Duke of York and the Duke of Gloucester have both become extinct more than once and both have been re-created as titles within the Peerage of the United Kingdom. Both titles are reserved for princes (and their descendants). The Duke of Lancaster has merged with the Crown and so is held by the monarch; the duchy of Lancaster provides a large private income to the monarch, in much the same way as the duchy of Cornwall does to the Prince (or Princess) of Wales.

Besides the dukedoms of Cornwall and Lancaster, the oldest extant title is that of Duke of Norfolk, dating from 1483 (the title was first created in 1397). The Duke of Norfolk is considered the premier duke of England. The premier duke of Scotland is the Duke of Hamilton and Brandon. The premier duke of Ireland is the Duke of Leinster.

== Order of precedence ==
Heraldic representation of the Coronet of a British duke.

The general order of precedence among dukes is:

1. Dukes in the Peerage of England, in order of creation
2. Dukes in the Peerage of Scotland, in order of creation
3. Dukes in the Peerage of Great Britain, in order of creation
4. Dukes in the Peerage of Ireland created before 1801, in order of creation
5. Dukes in the Peerage of the United Kingdom and dukes in the Peerage of Ireland created after 1801, in order of creation

Whilst the general order of precedence is set according to the age of the peerage, the sovereign's grace may accord any peer higher precedence than the date of ducal creation would warrant. The royal dukes are dukes of the United Kingdom, but rank higher in the order of precedence than the age of their titles warrants, due to their close relationships to the monarch. The Duke of Cornwall holds precedence above all dukes, royal and non-royal; he is concurrently the Prince of Wales, and the Duke of Rothesay, and of Cambridge.

== Dukes in the peerages of Britain and Ireland ==
#	Title	Creation	Peerage	Current holder			Notes
#	Title	Creation	Peerage	Duke	Age	Accession	Notes
1	Duke of Cornwall	1337 (Note: As the eldest son of the Sovereign, the Duke of Cornwall and Rothesay ranks higher in precedence than he would by virtue of the seniority of his dukedoms alone.)	England	Prince William, 25th Duke of Cornwall	44	2022	Also Duke of Rothesay in the Peerage of Scotland 1398 and Duke of Cambridge in the Peerage of the United Kingdom 2011 – see below
2	Duke of Norfolk	1483	England	Edward Fitzalan-Howard, 18th Duke of Norfolk	69	2002	Hereditary Earl Marshal of England, responsible for royal ceremony.
3	Duke of Somerset	1547	England	John Seymour, 19th Duke of Somerset	73	1984	
4	Duke of Richmond	1675	England	Charles Gordon-Lennox, 11th Duke of Richmond	71	2017	Also Duke of Lennox in the Peerage of Scotland (1675) – see below
5	Duke of Grafton	1675	England	Henry FitzRoy, 12th Duke of Grafton	48	2011	
6	Duke of Beaufort	1682	England	Henry Somerset, 12th Duke of Beaufort	74	2017	
7	Duke of St Albans	1684	England	Charles Beauclerk, 15th Duke of St Albans	61	2026	
8	Duke of Bedford	1694	England	Andrew Russell, 15th Duke of Bedford	64	2003	
9	Duke of Devonshire	1694	England	Peregrine Cavendish, 12th Duke of Devonshire	82	2004	
10	Duke of Marlborough	1702	England	James Spencer-Churchill, 12th Duke of Marlborough	70	2014	
11	Duke of Rutland	1703	England	David Manners, 11th Duke of Rutland	67	1999	
—	Duke of Rothesay	1398	Scotland	Prince William, 24th Duke of Rothesay	44	2022	Also Duke of Cornwall in the Peerage of England (1337) – see above
12	Duke of Hamilton	1643	Scotland	Alexander Douglas-Hamilton, 16th Duke of Hamilton	48	2010	Also Duke of Brandon in the Peerage of Great Britain (1711) – see below
13	Duke of Buccleuch	1663	Scotland	Richard Scott, 10th Duke of Buccleuch	72	2007	Also Duke of Queensberry in the Peerage of the Scotland (1684) – see below
—	Duke of Lennox	1675	Scotland	Charles Gordon-Lennox, 11th Duke of Richmond	71	2017	Also Duke of Richmond in the Peerage of England (1675) – see above
—	Duke of Queensberry	1684	Scotland	Richard Scott, 12th Duke of Queensberry	72	2007	Also Duke of Buccleuch in the Peerage of Scotland (1663) – see above
14	Duke of Argyll	1701	Scotland	Torquhil Campbell, 13th Duke of Argyll	58	2001	Also Duke of Argyll in the Peerage of the United Kingdom (1892) – see below
15	Duke of Atholl	1703	Scotland	Bruce Murray, 12th Duke of Atholl	66	2012	
16	Duke of Montrose	1707	Scotland	James Graham, 8th Duke of Montrose	91	1992	
17	Duke of Roxburghe	1707	Scotland	Charles Innes-Ker, 11th Duke of Roxburghe	45	2019	
—	Duke of Brandon	1711	Great Britain	Alexander Douglas-Hamilton, 16th Duke of Hamilton	48	2010	Also Duke of Hamilton in the Peerage of Scotland (1643) – see above
18	Duke of Manchester	1719	Great Britain	Alexander Montagu, 13th Duke of Manchester	63	2002	
19	Duke of Northumberland	1766	Great Britain	Ralph Percy, 12th Duke of Northumberland	69	1995	
20	Duke of Leinster	1766	Ireland	Maurice FitzGerald, 9th Duke of Leinster	78	2004	
21	Duke of Wellington	1814	United Kingdom	Charles Wellesley, 9th Duke of Wellington	81	2014	
22	Duke of Sutherland	1833	United Kingdom	Francis Egerton, 7th Duke of Sutherland	86	2000	
23	Duke of Abercorn	1868 (Note: The Dukedom of Abercorn was created after the Acts of Union 1800. It takes precedence after earlier Dukedoms of the United Kingdom.)	Ireland	James Hamilton, 5th Duke of Abercorn	92	1979	
24	Duke of Westminster	1874	United Kingdom	Hugh Grosvenor, 7th Duke of Westminster	35	2016	
—	Duke of Gordon	1876	United Kingdom	Charles Gordon-Lennox, 11th Duke of Richmond	71	2017	Also Duke of Richmond in the Peerage of England (1675) and Duke of Lennox in the Peerage of Scotland (1675) - see above
—	Duke of Argyll	1892	United Kingdom	Torquhil Campbell, 6th Duke of Argyll	58	2001	Also Duke of Argyll in the Peerage of Scotland (1701) – see above
25	Duke of Fife	1900	United Kingdom	David Carnegie, 4th Duke of Fife	65	2015	
26	Duke of Gloucester	1928 (Note: As members of the royal family, these dukes rank higher in precedence than they would by virtue of the seniority of their dukedoms alone.)	United Kingdom	Prince Richard, 2nd Duke of Gloucester	82	1974	
27	Duke of Kent	1934	United Kingdom	Prince Edward, 2nd Duke of Kent	91	1942	
28	Duke of York	1986	United Kingdom	Andrew Mountbatten-Windsor, Duke of York	66	1986	In 2025 Andrew Mountbatten-Windsor was removed from the Roll of the Peerage. Although this did not revoke his peerage, he is no longer entitled to any place in the orders of precedence derived from it, and has ceased to be addressed or referred to by the title in official documents.
—	Duke of Cambridge	2011	United Kingdom	Prince William, Duke of Cambridge	44	2011	Also Duke of Rothesay in the Peerage of Scotland (1398) and Duke of Cornwall in the Peerage of England (1337) – see above.
29	Duke of Sussex	2018	United Kingdom	Prince Harry, Duke of Sussex	42	2018	
30	Duke of Edinburgh	2023	United Kingdom	Prince Edward, Duke of Edinburgh	62	2023	Life peerage

== List of heirs of dukes in the peerages of the British Isles ==
=== Heirs apparent ===
Heir	Dukedom	Relationship	Notes
Royal dukedoms
Alexander Windsor, Earl of Ulster	Gloucester	Only son	
George Windsor, Earl of St Andrews	Kent	Elder son	
Prince George of Wales	Cambridge	Elder son	Not styled Earl of Strathearn
Prince Archie of Sussex	Sussex	Only son	Not styled Earl of Dumbarton
Peerage of England
Henry Fitzalan-Howard, Earl of Arundel	Norfolk	Eldest son	
Sebastian, Lord Seymour	Somerset	Elder son	
Charles Gordon-Lennox, Earl of March and Kinrara	Richmond	Eldest son	
Alfred FitzRoy, Earl of Euston	Grafton	Elder son	
Henry FitzRoy Somerset, Marquess of Worcester	Beaufort	Elder son	
James Beauclerk, Earl of Burford	St Albans	Only son	
Henry Russell, Marquess of Tavistock	Bedford	Only son	
William Cavendish, Earl of Burlington	Devonshire	Only son	Does not use Marquess of Hartington
George Spencer-Churchill, Marquess of Blandford	Marlborough	Elder son	
Charles Manners, Marquess of Granby	Rutland	Elder son	
Peerage of Scotland
Douglas Douglas-Hamilton, Marquess of Douglas and Clydesdale	Hamilton	Eldest son	
Walter Scott, Earl of Dalkeith	Buccleuch	Elder son	
Charles Gordon-Lennox, Earl of March and Kinrara	Lennox	Eldest son	See Duke of Richmond
Walter Scott, Earl of Dalkeith	Queensberry	Elder son	See Duke of Buccleuch
Archibald Campbell, Marquess of Lorne	Argyll	Elder son	
Michael Murray, Marquess of Tullibardine	Atholl	Elder son	
James Graham, Marquess of Graham	Montrose	Elder son	
Frederick Innes-Ker, Marquess of Bowmont and Cessford	Roxburghe	Only son	
Peerage of Great Britain
Douglas Douglas-Hamilton, Marquess of Douglas and Clydesdale	Brandon	Eldest son	See Duke of Hamilton
George Percy, Earl Percy	Northumberland	Elder son	
Peerage of the United Kingdom
Arthur Wellesley, Earl of Mornington	Wellington	Elder son	Does not use Marquess of Douro
James Granville Egerton, Marquess of Stafford	Sutherland	Elder son	
James Hamilton Marquess of Hamilton	Abercorn	Elder son	
Charles Gordon-Lennox, Earl of March and Kinrara	Gordon	Eldest son	See Duke of Richmond
Charles Duff Carnegie, Earl of Southesk	Fife	Eldest son	

=== Heirs presumptive ===
Heir	Dukedom	Relationship	Notes
Peerage of Great Britain
Lord Kimble Montagu	Manchester	Younger brother	
Peerage of Ireland
Edward FitzGerald	Leinster	Nephew	

=== Dukes without heirs/life-only dukedoms ===
Duke	Notes
Royal dukedoms
Duke of York	Married with issue but no sons.
Duke of Edinburgh	Dukedom granted for life only.
Peerage of the United Kingdom
Duke of Westminster	Married with issue but no sons.

== See also ==
- British nobility
- Dukes in the United Kingdom
- Duchies in England

== Sources ==
- Burke′s Peerage and Gentry
