= Lists of baronetcies =

Peerages and baronetcies of Britain and Ireland
Extant	All
Dukes	Dukedoms
Marquesses	Marquessates
Earls	Earldoms
Viscounts	Viscountcies
Barons	Baronies
Baronets	Baronetcies
En, Ire, NS, GB, UK (extinct)

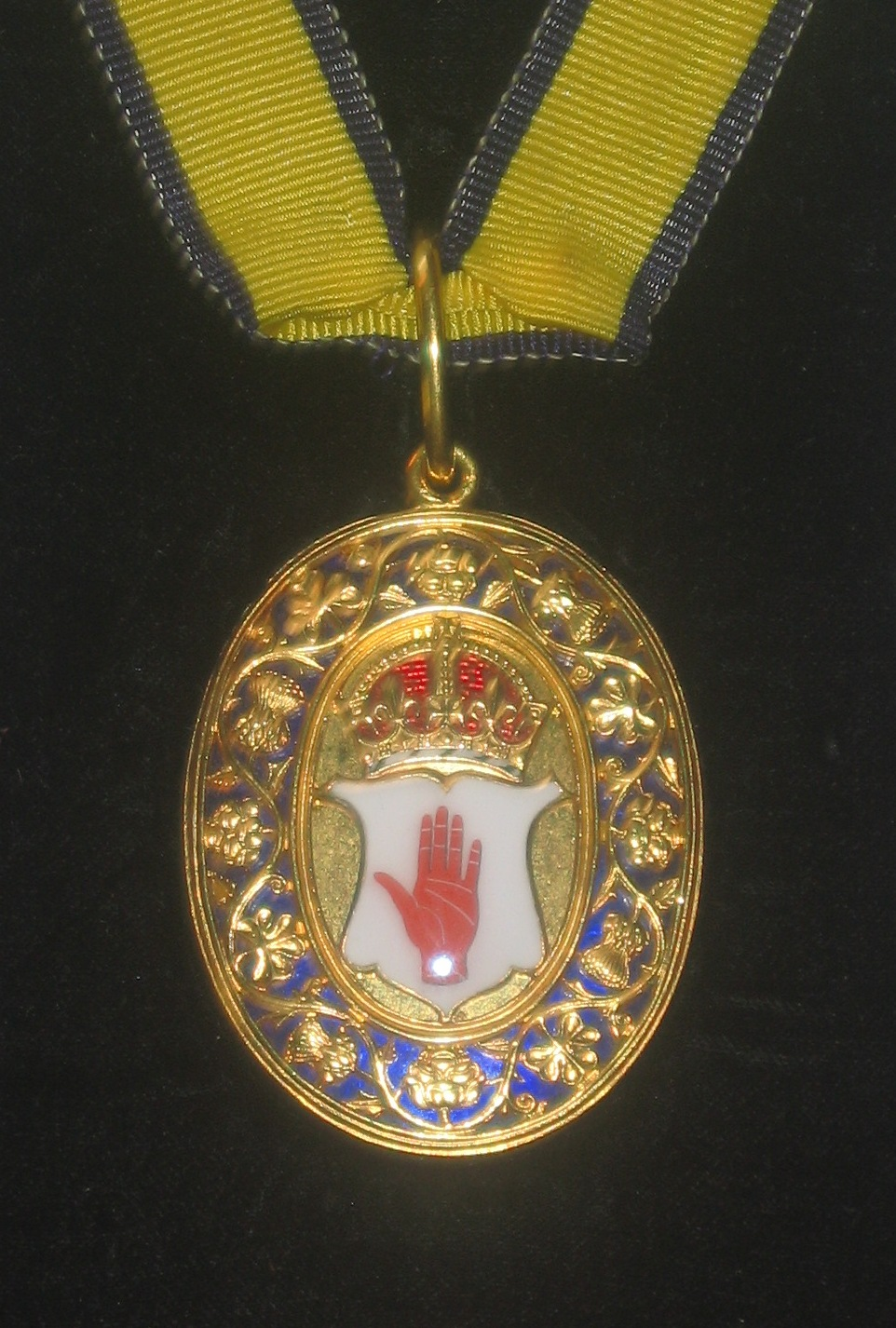
Neck decoration for British baronets, depicting the Red Hand of Ulster

This article lists baronetcies, whether extant, extinct, dormant, unproven, under review or forfeit, in the baronetages of England, Nova Scotia, Great Britain, Ireland and the United Kingdom.

The holders of some of the baronetcies listed on the lists have died but in each case, up to the present, no person has proved succession and thus been placed upon the Official Roll of the Baronetage. Some baronetcies are considered dormant because, although heirs are known to exist, succession has not been proved within a period of five years from the death of the holder.

A baronetcy becomes extinct when heirs cannot be traced and are believed not to exist. In this case, it should not be listed on the Official Roll but would be re-activated should an heir subsequently emerge.

The Royal Warrant of Edward VII of 8 February 1910 states "no person whose name is not entered on the Official Roll of Baronets shall be received as a Baronet, or shall be addressed or mentioned by that title in any civil or military Commission, Letters Patent, or other official document".

The lists below are not corroborated by The Standing Council of the Baronetage, the Lord Chancellor's Department or the Home Office. In addition, only the first is complete; the other five do not at the moment list all extinct baronetcies.

- List of extinct baronetcies
- List of extant baronetcies – complete
- List of dormant baronetcies – complete
- List of baronetcies in the Baronetage of England (from 1611 to 1707)
- List of baronetcies in the Baronetage of Ireland (from 1619 to 1801)
- List of baronetcies in the Baronetage of Nova Scotia (from 1624 to 1707)
- List of baronetcies in the Baronetage of Great Britain (from 1707 to 1801)
- List of baronetcies in the Baronetage of the United Kingdom (from 1801)
- List of baronetcies conferred upon British expatriates and non-British nationals
