= List of baronies in the Peerage of Ireland =

Peerages and baronetcies of Britain and Ireland
Extant	All
Dukes	Dukedoms
Marquesses	Marquessates
Earls	Earldoms
Viscounts	Viscountcies
Barons	Baronies
En, Sc, GB, Ire, UK (law, life: 1958–1979, 1979–1997, 1997–2010, 2010–2024, 2024–present)
Baronets	Baronetcies

This page, one list of hereditary baronies, lists all baronies, extant, extinct, dormant, abeyant, or forfeit, in the Peerage of Ireland.

Title	Date of Creation	Surname	Current Status	Notes
Baron Athenry	1172	Bermingham	dormant 1799	also Earl of Louth from 1759 to 1799, when this title became extinct
**Baron Kingsale**	1223	de Courcy	extant	
**Baron Kerry**	1223	Fitzmaurice	extant	also Earl of Kerry from 1723 and Marquess of Lansdowne in Great Britain from 1818
Baron Desmond	1259	FitzGerald	forfeit 1582	also Earl of Desmond from 1329
Baron Barry	1261	Barry	extinct 1823	also Viscount Buttevant from 1461 and Earl of Barrymore from 1628
**Baron Dunboyne**	1324	Butler, Clifford-Butler	extant	confirmed by letters patent in 1541
**Baron Gormanston**	c. 1370	Preston	extant	also Viscount Gormanston from 1478 and Baron Gormanston in the United Kingdom from 1868
Baron Slane	c. 1370	Fleming	forfeit 1691	
Baron Howth	1430	St Lawrence	extinct 1909	also Viscount St Lawrence and Earl of Howth from 1767, also Baron Howth in the United Kingdom from 1881
**Baron of Dunsany**	1439?	Plunkett	extant	
Baron Killeen	1449	Plunkett	extinct 1984	also Earl of Fingall from 1628, also Baron Fingall in the United Kingdom from 1831
Baron Portlester	1462	Fitzeustace	extinct 1496	
Baron Trimlestown	1462	Barnewall	dormant 2024	
Baron Ratoath	1468	Bold	extinct 1479	
**Baron Loundres**	1478	Preston	extant	subsidiary title of the Viscount Gormanston, also Baron Gormanston in the United Kingdom from 1868
**Baron Delvin**	1486	Nugent	extant	also Earl of Westmeath from 1621 and Marquess of Westmeath in the United Kingdom from 1822 to 1871
Baron Kilcullen	1535	Eustace	forfeit 1585	subsidiary title of the Viscount Baltinglass
Baron Power	1535	Power	forfeit 1704	subsidiary title of the Earl of Tyrone
Baron Odorney	1537	Fitzmaurice	extinct 1541	subsidiary title of the Viscount Kilmaule, also Baron Kerry, a title now held by the Marquess of Lansdowne
Baron Offaly	1538	O Conor Faly	1552	
Baron Carbery	1541	de Bermingham	extinct c. 1560	
**Baron Louth**	1541	Plunkett	extant	
Baron Upper Ossory	1541	Fitzpatrick	forfeit 1691	
Baron Dungannon	1542	O'Neill	extinct after 1542	
Baron Dunkellin	1543	de Burgh	extinct 1916	subsidiary title of the Earl of Clanricarde, also Baron Somerhill and Viscount Tunbridge in England from 1624 and Baron Imanney, Viscount Galway and Earl of St Albans in England from 1628, also Marquess of Clanricarde in Ireland from 1646 to 1657, from 1789 to 1797 and from 1825, also Earl of Clanricarde in Ireland from 1800 (a title which is extant and now held by the Marquess of Sligo), also Baron Somerhill in the United Kingdom from 1826
Baron Ibrackan	1543	O'Brien	forfeit 1741	also Earl of Thomond from 1551, also Viscount Tadcaster in Great Britain from 1714
**Baron Inchiquin**	1543	O'Brien	extant	also Earl of Inchiquin from 1654 to 1855 and Marquess of Thomond from 1800 to 1855
Baron of Ballyane	1554	Kavanagh	extinct 1555	Life peerage
Baron Valentia	1556	McCarthy	resigned 1597	subsidiary title of the Earl of Clancare
Baron of Ballyane	1558	Kavanagh	extinct after 1558	Life peerage
Baron Dromana	1569	Fitzgerald	extinct 1572	subsidiary title of the Viscount Decies
Baron Clogher	1578	O'Neill	extinct 1595	subsidiary title of the Earl of Clanconnel
Baron of Ardenerie	1580	Bourke	dormant 1591	
Baron Bourke of Castleconnell	1580	Bourke	forfeit 1691	
Baron Cahir	1583	Butler	extinct 1858	also Viscount Cahir and Earl of Glengall from 1816
Baron Leitrim	1583	de Burgh (or Burke)	Forfeit 1600	
Baron Dungannon	1587	O'Neill	forfeit 1612	
Baron Inchiquin	1600	Fitzgerald	extinct 1601	subsidiary title of the Earl of Desmond
Baron Chichester of Belfast	1613	Chichester	extinct 1625	
**Baron Ardee**	1616	Brabazon	extant	also Earl of Meath from 1627 and Baron Chaworth in the United Kingdom from 1831
Baron Audley of Hely	1616	Tuchet	extinct 1777	subsidiary title of the Earl of Castlehaven, also Baron Audley (created 1312) and Baron Audley of Orier in England, the latter title which was forfeited in 1633
**Baron Boyle of Youghal**	1616	Boyle	extant	subsidiary title of the Earl of Cork; also Baron Bandon Bridge and Viscount Boyle of Kinalmeaky from 1643; also Baron Clifford of Lanesborough in England from 1644 to 1753; also Earl of Burlington in England from 1664 to 1753; also Baron Clifford in England from 1691 to 1753; also Baron Boyle of Broghill and Earl of Orrery in Ireland and Baron Boyle of Marston in Great Britain from 1753
**Baron Moore**	1616	Moore	extant	also Viscount Moore from 1621, Earl of Drogheda from 1661, Marquess of Drogheda from 1791 to 1892 and Baron Moore of Cobham in the United Kingdom from 1954
Baron Ridgeway of Gallen-Ridgeway	1616	Ridgeway	extinct 1714	subsidiary title of the Earl of Londonderry
**Baron Hamilton of Strabane**	1617	Hamilton	extant	also Earl of Abercorn in Scotland from c. 1680, Viscount Strabane in Ireland from 1701, Viscount Hamilton in Great Britain from 1786, Marquess of Abercorn in Great Britain from 1790, Marquess of Hamilton in the United Kingdom and Duke of Abercorn in Ireland from 1868
Baron Bourke of Brittas	1618	Bourke	forfeit 1691	
**Baron Lambart of Cavan**	1618	Lambart	extant	also Viscount Kilcoursie and Earl of Cavan from 1647
Baron Mountjoy	1618	Blount	extinct 1681	also Baron Mountjoy from 1627 and Earl of Newport from 1628 in England
Baron Balfour of Glenawley	1619	Balfour	extinct 1636	
Baron Dillon	1619	Dillon	dormant 1850	subsidiary title of the Earl of Roscommon
**Baron Dunboyne**	1719	Grimston	extant	subsidiary title of the Viscount Grimston; also Baron Verulam in Great Britain from 1790; also Viscount Grimston and Earl of Verulam in the United Kingdom from 1815; also Lord Forrester of Corstorphine in Scotland from 1808
Baron Dunmore	1619	Preston	extinct 1628	subsidiary title of the Earl of Desmond, also Lord Dingwall in Scotland, which title is still extant
**Baron Offaly**	1620	Fitzgerald	extant	also Earl of Kildare from 1658, Marquess of Kildare from 1761 and Duke of Leinster from 1766, Baron Kildare in the United Kingdom from 1870
**Baron Caulfeild**	1620	Caulfeild	extant	also Viscount Charlemont in Ireland from 1665; also Earl of Charlemont in Ireland from 1763 to 1892; also Baron Charlemont in the United Kingdom from 1837 to 1892
**Baron Digby**	1620	Digby	extant	also Baron Digby in Great Britain from 1765; also Viscount Coleshill and Earl Digby in Great Britain from 1790 to 1856
Baron FitzWilliam	1620	FitzWilliam, Wentworth-FitzWilliam	extinct 1979	also Viscount Milton and Earl FitzWilliam from 1716, also Baron FitzWilliam of Milton in Great Britain from 1742, also Viscount Milton and Earl FitzWilliam in Great Britain from 1746
Baron Folliott	1620	Folliott	extinct 1716	
Baron Gorges of Dundalk	1620	Gorges	extinct 1712	
Baron Hervey	1620	Hervey	extinct 1642	also Baron Hervey in England from 1628
Baron Maynard	1620	Maynard	extinct 1775	also Viscount Maynard from 1766 (a title which became extinct in 1865), also Baron Maynard in England from 1628 to 1775
Baron Aungier	1621	Aungier	extinct 1706	also Viscount Aungier from 1665 and Earl of Longford from 1677
Baron Blayney	1621	Blayney	extinct 1874	
**Baron Boyle of Broghill**	1621	Boyle	extant	subsidiary title of the Earl of Orrery; also Baron Boyle of Marston in Great Britain from 1711; also Baron Boyle of Youghal, Baron Bandon Bridge, Viscount Boyle of Kinalmeaky, Viscount Dungarvan and Earl of Cork in Ireland from 1753
**Baron Castle Stuart**	1621	Stewart, Stuart, Stuart-Richardson	extant	dormant from 1685 to 1774; also Viscount Castle Stuart from 1793 and Earl Castle Stewart from 1800
Baron Dockwra	1621	Dockwra	extinct 1647	
Baron Vaughan of Mullengar	1621	Vaughan	extinct 1713	subsidiary title of the Earl of Carbery, also Baron Vaughan of Emlyn in England from 1643
Baron Esmonde	1622	Esmonde	extinct 1646	
**Baron Feilding**	1622	Feilding	extant	subsidiary title of the Earl of Desmond; also Earl of Denbigh in England from 1675
Baron Glean-O'Mallun	1622	O'Mallun	extinct after 1622	
Baron Baltimore	1624	Calvert	extinct 1771	
Baron Brereton	1624	Brereton	extinct 1722	
Baron Herbert of Castle Island	1624	Herbert	extinct 1791	also Baron Herbert of Chirbury in England from 1629
**Baron Chichester of Belfast**	1625	Chichester	extant	subsidiary title of the Viscount Chichester of Carrickfergus, also Earl of Donegall from 1647, Baron Fisherwick in Great Britain from 1790 and Marquess of Donegall in Ireland from 1791
Baron Coleraine	1625	Hare	extinct 1749	
Baron Bantry	1627	Roper	extinct 1672	subsidiary title of the Viscount Baltinglass
Baron Saunderson	1627	Saunderson	extinct 1723	subsidiary title of the Viscount Castleton, also Baron Saunderson from 1714, Viscount Carleton from 1716 and Earl of Castleton from 1720, the latter three titles which were all in the Peerage of Great Britain
Baron Sherard	1627	Sherard	extinct 1931	also Baron Harborough and Earl of Harborough in Great Britain from 1732 to 1859
Baron Ballymote	1628	Taaffe	suspended 1919	subsidiary title of the Viscount Taaffe, also Earl of Carlingford from 1661 to 1738
**Baron Bandon Bridge**	1628	Boyle	extant	subsidiary title of the Viscount Boyle of Kinalmeaky; also Baron Boyle of Youghal, Viscount Dungarvan and Earl of Cork in Ireland from 1643; also Baron Boyle of Broghill and Earl of Orrery in Ireland from 1753; also Baron Boyle of Marston in Peerage of Great Britain from 1753
Baron Chaworth	1628	Chaworth	extinct 1693	subsidiary title of the Viscount Chaworth
Baron Dromore	1628	Scudamore	extinct 1716	subsidiary title of the Viscount Scudamore
Baron Jones of Navan	1628	Jones	extinct 1885	subsidiary title of the Viscount Ranelagh, also Earl of Ranelagh from 1674 to 1712; Barony and Viscountcy dormant from 1712 to 1759
Baron Maguire	1628	Maguire	forfeit 1644	
**Baron Mountnorris**	1628	Annesley	extant	subsidiary title of the Viscount Valentia, also Baron Annesley and Earl of Anglesey in England from 1661 to 1761, also Earl of Mountnorris in Ireland from 1793 to 1844, also Baron Altham from 1737 to 1844
Baron Pope	1628	Pope	extinct 1668	subsidiary title of the Earl of Downe
Baron Wenman	1628	Wenman	extinct 1800	subsidiary title of the Viscount Wenman
Baron Fitzwilliam of Thorncastle	1629	FitzWilliam	extinct 1833	subsidiary title of the Viscount FitzWilliam of Meryon, also Earl of Tyrconnel from 1663 to 1667
Baron Philippstown	1631	O'Dempsey	extinct 1691	subsidiary title of the Viscount Clanmalier
Baron Alington	1642	Alington	extinct 1723	also Baron Alington in England from 1682
Baron Cullen	1642	Cokayne	extinct 1810	subsidiary title of the Viscount Cullen
Baron Tracy	1643	Tracy	extinct 1797	subsidiary title of the Viscount Tracy
Baron Bard of Dromboy	1645	Bard	extinct 1656	subsidiary title of the Viscount Bellomont
Baron Brouncker	1645	Brouncker	extinct 1688	subsidiary title of the Viscount Brouncker
Baron Hawley	1646	Hawley	extinct 1790	
Baron Turvey	1646	Barnewall	extinct 1834	subsidiary title of the Viscount Barnewall
Baron O'Brien	1654	O'Brien	extinct 1855	subsidiary title of the Earl of Inchiquin, also Baron Inchiquin (which title is still extant), also Marquess of Thomond from 1800, also Baron Thomond from 1801 to 1808 and Baron Tadcaster from 1826 to 1846 in the United Kingdom
Baron Boyle	1660	Boyle	extinct 1699	subsidiary title of the Viscount Shannon
Baron Coote of Coloony	1660	Coote	extinct 1800	created Earl of Bellomont in 1689 (extinct 1766) and Earl of Bellamont in 1767 (extinct 1800).
Baron Kingston	1660	King	extinct 1761	
**Baron Loughneagh**	1660	Clotworthy, Skeffington	extant	subsidiary title of the Viscount Massereene, also Earl of Massereene in Ireland from 1756 to 1816, also Viscount Ferrard and Baron Oriel in Ireland and Baron Oriel in the United Kingdom from 1843
Baron Barry of Santry	1661	Barry	extinct 1751	
Baron Palmer	1661	Palmer	extinct 1705	subsidiary title of the Earl of Castlemaine
Baron Butler of Cloughgrenan	1662	Butler	extinct 1686	subsidiary title of the Earl of Arran, also Baron Butler of Weston in Ireland from 1673
Baron Moyarta	1662	O'Brien	forfeit 1691	subsidiary title of the Viscount Clare
Baron Trevor	1662	Trevor	extinct 1706	subsidiary title of the Viscount Dungannon
Baron Berkeley of Rathdowne	1663	Berkeley	extinct 1712	subsidiary title of the Viscount Fitzhardinge, also Baron Botetourt of Langport and Earl of Falmouth in England from 1664 to 1665
Baron Boyle	1673	Boyle	extinct 1732	subsidiary title of the Viscount Blessington
Baron Butler of Weston	1673	Butler	extinct 1686	subsidiary title of the Earl of Arran (1662 creation)
**Baron Clanehugh**	1675	Forbes	extant	subsidiary title of the Viscount Granard, also Earl of Granard from 1684 and Baron Granard in the United Kingdom from 1806
Baron Cloney	1675	Ducie	extinct 1679	subsidiary title of the Viscount Downe
Baron Aghrim	1676	Butler	extinct 1677	subsidiary title of the Earl of Gowran
Baron Altham	1681	Annesley	extinct 1844	also Earl of Anglesey in England from 1737 to 1761; created Earl of Mountnorris (1793) in Ireland
Baron Oxmantown	1681	Parsons	extinct 1764	subsidiary title of the Viscount Rosse, also Earl of Rosse from 1718
Baron Stewart of Ramalton	1683	Stewart	extinct 1769	subsidiary title of the Viscount Mountjoy, also Earl of Blessington from 1745
Baron Rathfarnham	1685	Loftus	extinct 1691	subsidiary title of the Viscount Loftus
Baron Talbotstown	1685	Talbot	forfeit 1691	subsidiary title of the Duke of Tyrconnel
Baron Bellew of Duleek	1686	Bellew	extinct 1770	
Baron Tyaquin	1687	Bourke	extinct 1691	subsidiary title of the Viscount Galway
Baron Shelburne	1688	Petty	extinct 1696	
Baroness Shelburne	1688	Petty	extinct 1708	
Baron Jamestown	1689	Hewett	extinct 1689	subsidiary title of the Viscount Hewett
Baron Cutts of Gowran	1690	Cutts	extinct 1707	
Baron Tara	1691	Schomberg	extinct 1719	subsidiary title of the Duke of Leinster, also Baron Teyes, Earl of Brentford and Duke of Schomberg in England from 1693
Baron Aghrim	1692	de Ginkell	extinct 1844	subsidiary title of the Earl of Athlone
Baron Coningsby	1692	Coningsby	extinct 1761	also Baron Coningsby in Great Britain from 1715 to 1729, also Earl Coningsby in Great Britain from 1719, also Baron Coningsby of Hampton Court and Viscount Coningsby in Great Britain from 1729
Baron Portarlington	1692	de Ruvigny	extinct 1720	Subsidiary title of the Viscount Galway. Created Earl of Galway in 1697.
Baron Cloughrenan	1693	Butler	extinct 1758	subsidiary title of the Earl of Arran, also Baron Butler, Viscount Thurles, Earl of Ossory, Earl of Ormonde, Marquess of Ormonde and Duke of Ormonde from 1745
**Baron Fethard**	1695	Vaughan	extant	subsidiary title of the Viscount Lisburne; created Earl of Lisburne in Ireland in 1776
Baron Shelburne	1699	Petty	extinct 1751	subsidiary title of the Earl of Shelburne
Baron Glenawley	1701	Howe	extinct 1814	subsidiary title of the Viscount Howe, also Viscount Howe in Great Britain from 1782 to 1799, also Baron Howe and Earl Howe in Great Britain from 1788 to 1799; the title of Baron Howe is still extant and is now a subsidiary title of the Earl Howe (created in Peerage of the United Kingdom in 1821)
**Baron Mountcastle**	1701	Hamilton	extant	subsidiary title of the Viscount Strabane, also Earl of Abercorn in Scotland, Viscount Hamilton in Great Britain from 1786, Marquess of Abercorn in Great Britain from 1790, Marquess of Hamilton in the United Kingdom and Duke of Abercorn in Ireland from 1868
Baron Pierrepont	1702	Pierrepont	extinct 1715	also Baron Pierrepont in Great Britain from 1714
Baron Kilmayden	1703	St Leger	extinct 1767	subsidiary title of the Viscount Doneraile
Baron Verney	1703	Verney	extinct 1791	subsidiary title of the Viscount Fermanagh, also Earl Verney from 1742
Baron Mount Cashell	1706	Davys	extinct 1736	subsidiary title of the Viscount Mount Cashell
Baron Tyrawley	1706	O'Hara	extinct 1773	also Baron Kilmaine in Ireland from 1724
Baron Wandesford	1706	Wandesford	extinct 1784	subsidiary title of the Viscount Castlecomer, also Earl Wandesford in Great Britain from 1758
**Baron Conway of Killultagh**	1713	Seymour-Conway	extant	also Baron Conway in the Peerage of England; created Earl of Hertford in 1750 and Marquess of Hertford in 1793
**Baron Brodrick**	1715	Brodrick	extant	subsidiary title of the Viscount Midleton; also Baron Brodrick in the Great Britain from 1796; also Viscount Dunsford and Earl of Midleton in the United Kingdom from 1920 to 1979
**Baron Carbery**	1715	Evans, Evans-Freke	extant	
Baron Ferrard of Beaulieu	1715	Tichborne	extinct 1731	
Baron Gowran	1715	Fitzpatrick	extinct 1818	also Earl of Upper Ossory from 1751, also Baron Upper Ossory in Great Britain from 1794
**Baron Hamilton of Stackallan**	1715	Hamilton	extant	subsidiary title of the Viscount Boyne; also Baron Brancepeth in the United Kingdom from 1866
Baron Moore	1715	Moore	extinct 1764	created Earl of Charleville in 1758
Baron Newtown-Butler	1715	Butler	extinct 1998	also Viscount Lanesborough from 1728 and Earl of Lanesborough from 1756
Baron Perceval	1715	Perceval	extinct 2011	subsidiary title of the Earl of Egmont; also Baron Lovel and Holland in Peerage of Great Britain from 1762; also Baron Arden in the Peerage of the United Kingdom from 1841
Baron Ranelagh	1715	Cole	extinct 1754	
Baron Saint George	1715	Saint-George	extinct 1735	
Baron Trim	1715	Wharton	extinct 1728	subsidiary title of the Marquess of Catherlough, also Baron Wharton in England (which title is still extant), also Viscount Winchendon and Earl of Wharton in England, also Earl of Rathfarnham from 1715, also Marquess of Wharton and Marquess of Malmesbury in Great Britain from 1715, also Duke of Wharton in Great Britain from 1718
Baroness Dundalk	1716	von der Schulenburg	extinct 1743	subsidiary title of the Duchess of Munster, also Duchess of Kendal in Great Britain from 1719
**Baron Newborough**	1716	Cholmondeley	Extant	Subsidiary title of the Marquess of Cholmondeley
**Baron Philipstown**	1716	Molesworth	Extant	Subsidiary title of the Viscount Molesworth
Baron Allen	1717	Allen	extinct 1845	subsidiary title of the Viscount Allen
**Baron Rathdown**	1717	Chetwynd	extant	subsidiary title of the Viscount Chetwynd
**Baron Southwell**	1717	Southwell	extant	also Viscount Southwell from 1776
**Baron Hill of Kilwarlin**	1717	Hill	extant	subsidiary title of the Viscount Hillsborough, also Earl of Hillsborough from 1751, Baron Harwich in Great Britain from 1756, Earl of Hillsborough in Great Britain from 1772 and Marquess of Downshire in Ireland from 1789
**Baron Aylmer**	1718	Aylmer, Whitworth-Aylmer	extant	
Baron Charleville	1718	Brownlow	extinct 1754	subsidiary title of the Viscount Tyrconnel
Baron Loughuyre	1718	Fane	extinct 1766	subsidiary title of the Viscount Fane
Baron Newtown	1718	Child, Tylney	extinct 1784	subsidiary title of the Earl Tylney of Castlemaine
Baron Carpenter	1719	Carpenter	extinct 1853	also Viscount Carlingford and Earl of Tyrconnel from 1751
Baron Claneboye	1719	Hamilton	extinct 1798	subsidiary title of the Viscount Limerick, also Earl of Clanbrassil from 1756
Baron Londonderry	1719	Pitt	extinct 1765	subsidiary title of the Earl of Londonderry
Baron Barrington	1720	Barrington	extinct 1990	subsidiary title of the Viscount Barrington, also Baron Shute in the United Kingdom from 1880
**Baron Beresford**	1720	Beresford	extant	subsidiary title of the Viscount Tyrone, also Earl of Tyrone from 1746, Baron Tyrone in Great Britain from 1786, and Marquess of Waterford in Ireland from 1789
**Baron Gage**	1720	Gage	extant	subsidiary title of the Viscount Gage; also Baron Gage in Great Britain from 1780 to 1791; also Baron Gage in Great Britain from 1790
Baron Edenderry	1720	Blundell	extinct 1756	subsidiary title of the Viscount Blundell
Baron Vane of Dungannon	1720	Vane	extinct 1789	subsidiary title of the Viscount Vane
**Baron Bessborough**	1721	Ponsonby	extant	subsidiary title of the Earl of Bessborough; also Baron Ponsonby of Sysonby in Great Britain from 1749; also Baron Duncannon in the United Kingdom from 1844; also Earl of Bessborough in the United Kingdom from 1937 to 1993
**Baron Clifton of Rathmore**	1721	Bligh	extant	subsidiary title of the Earl of Darnley; also Baron Clifton in England from 1728 to 1900 and from 1937
Baron Darcy of Navan	1721	Darcy	extinct 1733	
Baron Whitworth	1721	Whitworth	extinct 1725	
Baron Kilmaine	1722	O'Hara	extinct 1774	also Baron Tyrawley in Ireland from 1724
Baron Temple of Mount Temple	1723	Temple	extinct 1865	subsidiary title of the Viscount Palmerston
Baron Micklethwaite	1724	Micklethwaite	extinct 1734	first Baron created Viscount Micklethwaite in 1727
Baron Culmore	1725	Bateman	extinct 1802	subsidiary title of the Viscount Bateman
**Baron Killard**	1727	Monckton, Monckton-Arundell	extant	subsidiary title of the Viscount Galway; also Baron Monckton of Serlby in the United Kingdom from 1887 to 1971
Baron Wyndham	1731	Wyndham	extinct 1745	
**Baron Castle Durrow**	1733	Flower	extant	created Viscount Ashbrook in Ireland in 1751
Baron Catherlough	1733	Fane	extinct 1762	also Baron Burghersh, Baron Le Despencer and Earl of Westmorland in England from 1736 to 1762
Baron Desart	1733	Cuffe	extinct 1934	also Viscount Desart from 1781, also Viscount Castlecuffe and Earl of Desart from 1793, also Baron Desart in the United Kingdom from 1909
Baron Sundon	1735	Clayton	extinct 1752	
Baron Braco of Kilbryde	1735	Duff	extinct 1912	created Earl Fife in 1759
Baron Belfield	1738	Rochfort	extinct 1814	subsidiary title of the Earl of Belvidere
Baron Maule	1743	Maule	extinct 1782	subsidiary title of the Earl Panmure
**Baron Newport of Newport**	1743	Jocelyn	extant	subsidiary title of the Viscount Jocelyn; also Earl of Roden from 1771; also Baron Clanbrassil in the United Kingdom from 1821 from 1897
**Baron Wingfield**	1743	Wingfield	extant	subsidiary title of the Viscount Powerscourt, also Baron Powerscourt in the United Kingdom from 1885
Baron Fortescue of Credan	1746	Fortescue-Aland	extinct 1781	
Baron Luxborough	1746	Knight	extinct 1772	subsidiary title of the Earl of Catherlough
**Baron Mornington**	1746	Wesley, Wellesley	extant	also Earl of Mornington from 1760, Marquess Wellesley from 1799 to 1842 and Duke of Wellington in the United Kingdom from 1863
Baron Kingsborough	1748	King	extinct 1755	
**Baron Knapton**	1750	Vesey	extant	created Viscount de Vesci in 1776, also Baron de Vesci in the United Kingdom from 1884 to 1903
Baron Malton	1750	Watson-Wentworth	extinct 1782	subsidiary title of the Earl Malton (created September 1750), also Baron Rockingham in England from December 1750), also Baron Wath, Baron Malton, Baron Rockingham, Viscount Higham, Earl of Malton and Marquess of Rockingham in Great Britain from December 1750
Baron Rawdon	1750	Rawdon	extinct 1868	subsidiary title of the Earl of Moira, also Baron Rawdon in Great Britain from 1783, also Baron Botreaux, Baron Hungerford and Baron de Moleyns in England from 1808, also Viscount Loudoun, Earl Rawdon and Marquess of Hastings in the United Kingdom from 1816, also Lord Tarrinzean and Mauchline, Lord Campbell of Loudoun and Earl of Loudoun in Scotland from 1840 (which titles are still extant - see the Earl of Loudoun), also Baron Grey de Ruthyn in England from 1858
**Baron Dunkeron**	1751	Petty-Fitzmaurice	extant	subsidiary title of the Viscount Fitzmaurice, also Earl of Shelburne from 1753; Baron Wycombe of Chipping Wycombe from 1760 and Marquess of Lansdowne from 1784 in Great Britain
Baron Loftus	1751	Loftus, Hume-Loftus	extinct 1783	created Viscount Loftus in 1756; Earl of Ely from 1766 to 1769 and from 1771 to 1783
Baron Carysfort	1752	Proby	extinct 1909	also Earl of Carysfort from 1789, also Baron Carysfort in the United Kingdom from 1801
**Baron Conyngham**	1753	Conyngham	extant	also Viscount Conyngham from 1756 to 1781, Earl Conyngham from 1780 to 1781, Viscount Conyngham from 1789, Earl Conyngham from 1797, Marquess Conyngham from 1816, Baron Minster in the United Kingdom from 1821
Baron Milton	1753	Damer	extinct 1808	created Baron Milton in Great Britain in 1763 and Earl of Dorchester in Great Britain in 1792
**Baron Pollington**	1753	Savile	extant	subsidiary title of the Earl of Mexborough
Baron Ludlow	1755	Ludlow	extinct 1842	subsidiary title of the Earl Ludlow, also Baron Ludlow in the United Kingdom from 1831
Baron Blakeney	1756	Blakeney	extinct 1756	
**Baron Farnham**	1756	Maxwell	extant	also Viscount Farnham from 1760 to 1779 and from 1781 to 1823 and Earl of Farnham from 1763 to 1779 and from 1785 to 1823
**Baron Longford**	1756	Pakenham	extant	also Earl of Longford in Ireland from 1794, also Baron Silchester in the United Kingdom from 1821, also Baron Pakenham from 1961, also Baron Pakenham of Cowley (life peerage) from 1999 to 2001
Baron Mountmorres	1756	Morres, de Montmorency	extinct 1951	subsidiary title of the Viscount Mountmorres
**Baron Castle Martyr**	1756	Boyle	extant	subsidiary title of the Earl of Shannon; also Baron Carleton in Great Britain from 1786
Baron Ibrackan	1756	Wyndham-O'Brien	extinct 1774	subsidiary title of the Earl of Thomond
Baron Russborough	1756	Leeson	extinct 1891	subsidiary title of the Earl of Milltown
Baron Bowes	1758	Bowes	extinct 1767	
Baron Brandon	1758	Crosbie	extinct 1832	also Viscount Crosbie from 1771 to 1815 and Earl of Glandore from 1776 to 1815
**Baron Saunders**	15 August 1758	Gore	extant	subsidiary title of the Viscount Sudley; created Earl of Arran in 1762
**Baron Lisle**	1758	Lysaght	extant	
**Baron Courtown**	1758	Stopford	extant	also Earl of Courtown from 1762 and Baron Saltersford in Great Britain from 1796
**Baron Annesley**	1758	Annesley	extant	also Viscount Glerawly from 1766 and Earl Annesley from 1789
**Baron Mount Eagle**	1760	Browne	extant	also Viscount Westport from 1768, Earl of Altamont from 1771 and Marquess of Sligo from 1800, Baron Monteagle in the United Kingdom from 1806
**Baron Headfort**	1760	Taylour	extant	created Viscount Headfort in 1762, Earl of Bective in 1766 and Marquess of Headfort in 1800; also Baron Kenlis in the United Kingdom from 1831
Baron Holmes	1760	Holmes	extinct 1764	
**Baron Mountflorence**	1760	Cole	extant	also Viscount Enniskillen from 1776, Earl of Enniskillen from 1789 and Baron Grinstead in the United Kingdom from 1815
**Baron Winterton**	1761	Turnour	extant	subsidiary title of the Earl Winterton; also Baron Turnour in the United Kingdom from 1952 to 1962
**Baron Clive of Plassey**	1762	Clive	extant	also Baron Clive of Walcot in Great Britain from 1794 and Earl of Powis in the United Kingdom from 1804
Baron Coleraine	1762	Hanger	extinct 1824	
Baron Orwell	1762	Vernon	extinct 1823	subsidiary title of the Earl of Shipbrooke
Baron Waltham	1762	Olmius	extinct 1787	
Baron Baltinglass	1763	Stratford	extinct 1875	created Viscount Aldborough in 1776 and Earl of Aldborough in 1777 in Ireland
Baron Saint George	1763	Saint-George	extinct 1775	
Baron Gore	1764	Gore	extinct 1802	subsidiary title of the Earl of Ross
Baron Kilworth	1764	Moore	extinct 1915	subsidiary title of the Viscount Mount Cashell, also Earl of Mount Cashell from 1781
**Baron Kingston**	1764	King, King-Tenison	extant	subsidiary title of the Earl of Kingston; also Baron Kingston in the United Kingdom from 1821 to 1869; also Baron Erris and Viscount Lorton in Ireland from 1869
Baron Hill of Olderfleet	1765	Hill-Trevor	extinct 1862	subsidiary title of the Viscount Dungannon
Baron Annaly	1766	Gore	extinct 1784	
Baron Ardelve	1766	Mackenzie	extinct 1781	subsidiary title of the Earl of Seaforth
**Baron Gillford**	1766	Meade	extant	subsidiary title of the Earl of Clanwilliam; also Baron Clanwilliam in the United Kingdom from 1828
Baron Pigot	1766	Pigot	extinct 1777	
**Baron Mulgrave**	1767	Phipps	extant	also Baron Mulgrave in the United Kingdom from 1790 to 1792; also Baron Mulgrave in the United Kingdom from 1794, Viscount Normanby and Earl of Mulgrave in the United Kingdom from 1812; also Marquess of Normanby in the United Kingdom from 1838
Baron Nugent	1767	Nugent	extinct 1788	subsidiary title of the Earl Nugent (extinct 1889), the latter title which merged with the title of Marquess of Buckingham in 1788, also Duke of Buckingham and Chandos from 1822
**Baron Erne**	1768	Creighton, Crichton	extant	also Earl Erne from 1789 and Baron Fermanagh in the United Kingdom from 1876
Baron Eyre	1768	Eyre	extinct 1781	
Baron Irnham	1768	Luttrell	extinct 1829	subsidiary title of the Earl of Carhampton
**Baron Lifford**	1768	Hewitt	extant	also Viscount Lifford from 1781
Baron Sydney	1768	Cosby	extinct 1774	
Baroness Arden	1770	Perceval	extinct 2011	also Baron Arden in the United Kingdom from 1802; also Earl of Egmont from 1841
**Baron Bangor**	1770	Ward	extant	subsidiary title of the Viscount Bangor
Baron Clermont	1770	Fortescue	extinct 1806	also Baron Clermont and Viscount Clermont in Ireland from 1776 and Earl of Clermont in Ireland from 1777
Baron Dartrey	1770	Dawson	extinct 1813	subsidiary title of the Viscount Cremorne, also Baron Cremorne from 1797
**Baron Dawson**	1770	Dawson, Dawson-Damer	extant	subsidiary title of the Viscount Carlow; created Earl of Portarlington in Ireland in 1785
Baron Melbourne	1770	Lamb	extinct 1853	subsidiary title of the Viscount Melbourne, also Baron Melbourne in the United Kingdom from 1815, also Baron Beauvale in the United Kingdom from 1848
Baron Clermont	1776	Fortescue	extinct 1829	subsidiary title of the Earl of Clermont
Baron Clifden	1776	Agar, Agar-Ellis	extinct 1974	also Viscount Clifden from 1781, also Baron Mendip in Great Britain from 1802 and Baron Dover in the United Kingdom from 1836
Baron Clonmore	1776	Howard, Forward-Howard	extinct 1978	subsidiary title of the Viscount Wicklow, also Countess of Wicklow from 1793
Baron de Montalt	1776	Maude	extinct 1777	
**Baron Gosford**	1776	Acheson	extant	subsidiary title of the Earl of Gosford; also Baron Worlingham in the United Kingdom from 1835; also Baron Acheson in the United Kingdom from 1849
**Baron Kensington**	1776	Edwardes	extant	also Baron Kensington in the United Kingdom from 1886
**Baron Lucan**	1776	Bingham	extant	subsidiary title of the Earl of Lucan; also Baron Bingham in the United Kingdom from 1934
Baron Macartney	1776	Macartney	extinct 1806	subsidiary title of the Earl Macartney, also Baron Macartney in Great Britain from 1796
**Baron Macdonald**	1776	Macdonald	extant	
**Baron Massy**	1776	Massy	extant	
Baron Milford	1776	Philipps	extinct 1823	
**Baron Naas**	1776	Bourke	extant	subsidiary title of the Earl of Mayo
**Baron Newborough**	1776	Wynn	extant	
Baron Newhaven	1776	Mayne	extinct 1794	
Baron Ongley	1776	Henley-Ongley	extinct 1877	
**Baron Doneraile**	1776	St Leger	extant	created Viscount Doneraile in Ireland in 1785
Baron Shuldham	1776	Shuldham	extinct 1798	
Baron Templetown	1776	Upton	extinct 1981	also Viscount Templetown from 1806
**Baron Westcote**	1776	Lyttelton	extant	also Baron Lyttelton of Frankley in Great Britain from 1794; also Baron Cobham and Viscount Cobham in Great Britain from 1889
Baron Rokeby	1777	Robinson	extinct 1883	
**Baron Belmore**	1781	Lowry-Corry	extant	subsidiary title of the Earl Belmore
**Baron Muskerry**	1781	Deane	extant	
Baron Tracton	1781	Dennis	extinct 1782	
Baron Sheffield of Dunamore	1780	Baker-Holroyd	extinct 1909	subsidiary title of the Earl of Sheffield, also Baron Sheffield in the United Kingdom from 1802, also Baron Sheffield of Roscommon in Ireland from 1783, a title which is still extant and since 1909 merged with the titles of Baron Stanley of Alderley and Baron Eddisbury in the United Kingdom
**Baron Welles**	1781	Knox	extant	also Viscount Northland from 1791 and Earl of Ranfurly from 1831; also Baron Ranfurly in the United Kingdom from 1826
Baron Conyngham	4 January 1781	Conyngham	extinct 1781	
**Baron Hood**	1782	Hood	extant	also Viscount Hood in Great Britain from 1796; also Baron Hood in Great Britain from 1816
Baron Delaval	1783	Delaval	extinct 1808	also Baron Delaval in Great Britain from 1786
**Baron Donoughmore**	1783	Hely-Hutchinson	extant	subsidiary title of the Earl of Donoughmore; also Viscount Hutchinson since 1821 and Baron Hutchinson in the United Kingdom from 1825 to 1832
**Baron Harberton**	1783	Pomeroy	extant	also Viscount Harberton from 1791
Baron Leitrim	1783	Clements	extinct 9 June 1952	also Viscount Leitrim from 1793 and Earl of Leitrim from 1795, also Baron Clements in the United Kingdom from 1831
Baron Landaff	1783	Mathew	extinct 1833	subsidiary title of Earl Landaff
Baron Penrhyn	1783	Pennant	extinct 1808	
**Baron Sheffield of Roscommon**	1783	Baker-Holroyd, Holroyd, Stanley	extant	also Baron Sheffield of Dunamore in Peerage of Ireland until 1909; also Baron Sheffield in the United Kingdom from 1802 to 1909; also Viscount Pevensey and Earl of Sheffield in the United Kingdom from 1816 to 1909; also Baron Stanley of Alderley and Baron Eddisbury in the United Kingdom from 1909
Baron Muncaster	1783	Pennington	extinct 1917	also Baron Muncaster in the United Kingdom from 1898
Baron Riversdale	1783	Tonson	extinct 1861	
Baron Earlsfort	1784	Scott	extinct 1935	subsidiary title of the Earl of Clonmell
**Baron de Montalt**	1785	Maude	extant	subsidiary title of the Viscount Hawarden; also Earl de Montalt in the United Kingdom from 1886 to 1905
Baron Lismore	1785	O'Callaghan	extinct 1898	created Viscount Lismore in 1806; also Baron Lismore in the United Kingdom from 1838
**Baron Loftus**	1785	Loftus	extant	also Viscount Loftus from 1789, Earl of Ely from 1794 and Marquess of Ely from 1801, Baron Loftus in the United Kingdom from 1801
Baron Sunderlin	1785	Malone	extinct 1816	created Baron Sunderlin also in 1797, which title also became extinct in 1816
Baron Fitzgibbon	1789	Fitzgibbon	extinct 1864	created Viscount FitzGibbon in 1793 and Earl of Clare in 1795
Baron Annaly	1789	Gore	extinct 1793	
**Baron Auckland**	1789	Eden	extant	also Baron Auckland in the Great Britain from 1793; created Earl of Auckland in the United Kingdom in 1839, a title which became extinct in 1849
Baron Carleton	1789	Carleton	extinct 1825	created Viscount Carleton in 1797
Baron Cloncurry	1789	Lawless	extinct 1929	also Baron Cloncurry in the United Kingdom from 1831
Baron Eardley	1789	Eardley	extinct 1824	
**Baron Londonderry**	1789	Stewart	extant	created Viscount Castlereagh in 1795, Earl of Londonderry in 1796 and Marquess of Londonderry in 1816; also Baron Stewart from 1822 and Earl Vane from 1823 in the United Kingdom
**Baron Kilmaine**	1789	Browne	extant	
Baron Mountjoy	1789	Gardiner	extinct 1829	subsidiary title of the Viscount Mountjoy, also Earl of Blessington from 1816
**Baron Caledon**	1790	Alexander	extant	created Viscount Caledon in 1797 and Earl of Caledon in 1800
Baron Callan	1790	Agar	extinct 1815	
Baron Clonbrock	1790	Dillon	extinct 1926	
**Baron Glentworth**	1790	Pery	extant	created Earl of Limerick in 1803
**Baroness Oriel**	1790	Foster, Skeffington	extant	also Viscount Ferrard in Ireland from 1797, Baron Oriel in the United Kingdom from 1828 and Viscount Massereene in Ireland from 1843
Baron St Helens	1791	Fitzherbert	extinct 1839	also Baron St Helens in the United Kingdom from 1801
Baroness Fermanagh	1792	Verney	extinct 1810	
**Baron Oxmantown**	1792	Parsons	extant	also Viscount Oxmantown from 1795 to 1807 and Earl of Rosse from 1806
**Baron Waterpark**	1792	Cavendish	extant	
Baron Bandon	1793	Bernard	extinct 1979	subsidiary title of the Earl of Bandon
Baron O'Neill	1793	O'Neill	extinct 1855	subsidiary title of the Viscount O'Neill, also Viscount Raymond and Earl O'Neill from 1800 to 1841
**Baron Bridport**	1794	Hood	extant	also Baron Bridport in Great Britain from 1796 to 1814; also Viscount Bridport in Great Britain from 1800 to 1814; also Viscount Bridport in the United Kingdom from 1868
**Baron Graves**	1794	Graves	extant	
Baron Avonmore	1795	Yelverton	dormant 1910	subsidiary title of the Viscount Avonmore
Baroness Kilwarden	1795	Wolfe	extinct 1830	also Baron Kilwarden (created 1798) and Viscount Kilwarden from 1804
Baron Lavington	1795	Payne	extinct 1807	
Baron Longueville	1795	Longfield	extinct 1811	subsidiary title of the Viscount Longueville
Baron Rancliffe	1795	Parkyns	extinct 1850	
**Baron Somerton**	1795	Agar	extant	subsidiary title of the Earl of Normanton; also Baron Somerton in the United Kingdom from 1873 and Baron Mendip in Great Britain from 1974
**Baron Carrington**	1796	Smith, Carrington, Wynn-Carington, Carington	extant	also Baron Carrington from 1797 in Great Britain; Earl Carrington from 1895 to 1928, Marquess of Lincolnshire from 1912 to 1928 and Baron Carington of Upton from 1999, in the United Kingdom
**Baron Huntingfield**	1796	Vanneck	extant	
**Baron Rossmore**	1796	Cuninghame, Westenra	extant	also Baron Rossmore in the United Kingdom from 1838
Baron Bantry	1797	White-Hedges-White	extinct 1891	subsidiary title of the Earl of Bantry
**Baron Crofton**	1797	Crofton	extant	
Baron Cremorne	1797	Dawson	extinct 1933	also Baron Dartrey and Viscount Cremorne (which titles became extinct in 1813), also Baron Dartrey from 1847 and Earl of Dartrey from 1866 in the United Kingdom
Baron Headley	1797	Allanson-Winn	extinct 1994	
Baron Holmes	1797	Holmes	extinct 1804	
**Baron Hotham**	1797	Hotham	extant	
**Baron Kilconnel**	1797	Trench	extant	subsidiary title of the Earl of Clancarty; also Baron Trench and Viscount Clancarty in the United Kingdom from 1815 and 1823 respectively
**Baron Monck**	1797	Monck	extant	also Viscount Monck from 1801 and Baron Monck in the United Kingdom from 1866; also Earl of Rathdowne in the Peerage of Ireland from 1822 to 1848
Baron Keith	1797	Elphinstone	extinct 1867	also Baron Keith from 1801 and Viscount Keith from 1814 to 1823, in the United Kingdom; Lord Nairne in Scotland from 1824
**Baroness Norwood**	1797	Toler, Graham-Toler	extant	also Baron Norbury in Ireland from 1822; also Viscount Glandine and Earl of Norbury in Peerage of Ireland from 1832
Baron Sunderlin	1797	Sunderlin	extinct 1816	had been created Baron Sunderlin already in 1785, which title also became extinct in 1816
Baron Tullamore	1797	Bury	extinct 1875	subsidiary title of the Earl of Charleville
Baron Tyrawley	1797	Cuffe	extinct 1821	
Baron Castlerosse	1798	Browne	extinct 1952	subsidiary title of the Viscount Kenmare; created Earl of Kenmare in 1801; also Baron Kenmare in the United Kingdom from 1841 to 1853 and from 1856
**Baron ffrench**	1798	ffrench	extant	
Baron Kilwarden	1798	Wolfe	extinct 1830	subsidiary title of the Viscount Kilwarden, also Baron Kilwarden (created 1795) from 1804
Baron Teignmouth	1798	Shore	extinct 1981	
**Baron Henley**	1799	Eden, Henley	extant	also Baron Northington in the United Kingdom from 1885
Baron Adare	1800	Quin	extinct 2011	created Earl of Dunraven and Mount-Earl (1822) in Ireland; also Baron Kenry in the United Kingdom from 1826 to 1926
Baron Castle Coote	1800	Coote	extinct 1827	also Earl of Mountrath from 1800 to 1802
**Baron Clanmorris**	1800	Bingham	extant	
Baron de Blaquiere	1800	de Blaquiere	extinct 1920	
**Baron Dufferin and Claneboye**	1800	Blackwood, Hamilton-Temple-Blackwood	extant	created Earl of Dufferin on 13 November 1871 and Marquess of Dufferin and Ava on 17 November 1888, which titles all became extinct 29 May 1988
**Baron Dunalley**	1800	Prittie	extant	
**Baron Ennismore**	1800	Hare	extant	subsidiary title of the Earl of Listowel; also Baron Hare in the United Kingdom from 1869
Baron Frankfort	1800	de Montmorency	extinct 1917	subsidiary title of the Viscount Frankfort de Montmorency
Baron Lecale	1800	FitzGerald	extinct 1810	
Baron Radstock	1800	Waldegrave	extinct 1953	
**Baron Erris**	1800	King, King-Tenison	extant	subsidiary title of the Viscount Lorton; also Earl of Kingston in Ireland from 1869
**Baron Ashtown**	1800	Trench	extant	
Baron Clarina	1800	Massey	extinct 1952	
Baron Gardner	1800	Gardner	dormant 1883	also Baron Gardner in the United Kingdom from 1806
Baron Glenbervie	1800	Douglas	extinct 1823	
**Baron Norbury**	1800	Toler, Graham-Toler	extant	also Baron Norwood in Ireland from 1822; also Viscount Glandine and Earl of Norbury in Ireland from 1831
Baroness Nugent	1800	Nugent-Temple-Grenville, Nugent-Grenville	extinct 1850	
Baron Hartland	1800	Mahon	extinct 1845	
**Baron Henniker**	1800	Henniker, Henniker-Major	extant	also Baron Hartismere in the United Kingdom from 1866
**Baron Langford**	1800	Rowley, Rowley-Conwy	extant	
Baron Mount Sandford	1800	Sandford	extinct 1846	
Baroness Newcomen	1800	Gleadowe-Newcomen	extinct 1825	first Baroness created Viscountess Newcomen in 1803
Baron Tara	1800	Preston	extinct 1821	
**Baron Ventry**	1800	Mullins	extant	
Baron Wallscourt	1800	Blake	extinct 1920	Suspended from 1803 to 1806
Baron Whitworth	1800	Whitworth	extinct 1825	created Viscount Whitworth in 1813 and Earl Whitworth in 1815 in the United Kingdom
**Baron Rendlesham**	1806	Thellusson	extant	
**Baron Kiltarton**	1810	Prendergast-Smyth, Vereker	extant	subsidiary title of the Viscount Gort
**Baron Decies**	1812	Beresford, Horsley-Beresford	extant	
**Baron Castlemaine**	1812	Handcock	extant	
**Baron Garvagh**	1818	Canning	extant	
Baron Howden	1819	Howden	extinct 1873	also Baron Howden in the United Kingdom from 1831
Baron Downes	1822	Downes, de Burgh	extinct 1863	
Baron Bloomfield	1825	Bloomfield	extinct 1879	also Baron Bloomfield in the United Kingdom from 1871
Baroness Fitzgerald and Vesey	1826	Fitzgerald	extinct 1860	also Baron Fitzgerald in the United Kingdom from 1835 to 1843
Baron O'Grady	1831	O'Grady	extinct 1955	subsidiary title of the Viscount Guillamore
**Baron Talbot of Malahide**	1831	Talbot, Arundell	extant	also Baron Furnival in the United Kingdom from 1839 to 1849; also Baron Talbot de Malahide in the United Kingdom from 1856 to 1973
**Baron Carew**	1834	Carew, Conolly-Carew	extant	also Baron Carew in the United Kingdom from 1838
**Baron Oranmore and Browne**	1836	Browne	extant	also Baron Mereworth in the United Kingdom from 1926
Baron Dunsandle and Clanconal	1845	Daly	extinct 1911	
**Baron Bellew**	1848	Bellew	extant	
Baron Clermont	1852	Fortescue, Parkinson-Fortescue	extinct 1898	also Baron Clermont in the United Kingdom from 1866 to 1887 and Baron Carlingford in the United Kingdom from 1887
**Baron Fermoy**	1856	Roche	extant	
Baron Athlumney	1863	Somerville	extinct 1929	also Baron Meredyth in the United Kingdom from 1866
**Baron Rathdonnell**	1868	McClintock, McClintock-Bunbury	extant	
Baron Curzon of Kedleston	1898	Curzon	extinct 1925	created Earl Curzon of Kedleston in 1911 and Marquess Curzon of Kedleston in 1921, in the United Kingdom

== See also ==
- List of baronies in the Peerage of England
- List of lordships of Parliament (for Scotland)
- List of baronies in the Peerage of Great Britain
- List of hereditary baronies in the Peerage of the United Kingdom
