= List of hereditary baronies in the Peerage of Great Britain =

Peerages and baronetcies of Britain and Ireland
Extant	All
Dukes	Dukedoms
Marquesses	Marquessates
Earls	Earldoms
Viscounts	Viscountcies
Barons	Baronies
En, Sc, GB, Ire, UK (law, life: 1958–1979, 1979–1997, 1997–2010, 2010–2024, 2024–present)
Baronets	Baronetcies

This is a list of hereditary baronies extant, extinct, dormant, abeyant, or forfeit, in the Peerage of Great Britain.

== Baronies, 1707–1801 ==
=== Anne (1707–1714) ===
Title	Date of Creation	Surname	Current Status	Notes
Baron Ripon	26 May 1708	Douglas	Extinct 1778	created Marquess of Beverley and Duke of Dover at the same time, which titles also became extinct in 1778; also Duke of Queensberry in the Peerage of Scotland, which title is extant and held by the Duke of Buccleuch
Baron Harcourt	3 September 1711	Harcourt	Extinct 1830	created Viscount Harcourt in 1721 and Earl Harcourt in 1749
Baron Boyle of Marston	5 September 1711	Boyle	Extant	also Earl of Orrery in the Peerage of Ireland; also Earl of Cork in the Peerage of Ireland since 1753
Baron Dutton	10 September 1711	Hamilton, Hamilton-Douglas	Extant	created Duke of Brandon at the same time; also Duke of Hamilton in the Peerage of Scotland
Baron Hay of Penwardine	31 December 1711	Hay	Extant	also Earl of Kinnoull in the Peerage of Scotland.
Baron Middleton	1 January 1712	Willoughby	Extant	
Baron Burton	1 January 1712	Paget	Extinct 1769	created Earl of Uxbridge in 1714, which title also became extinct in 1769; also Baron Paget de Beaudesert from 1712 to 1769, which title is extant and held by the Marquess of Anglesey
Baron Foley	1 January 1712	Foley	Extinct 1766	
Baron Lansdowne	1 January 1712	Granville	Extinct 1735	
Baron Mansell	1 January 1712	Mansell	Extinct 1750	
Baron Mountjoy	1 January 1712	Windsor	Extinct 1758	also Viscount Windsor in the Peerage of Ireland
Baron Trevor	1 January 1712	Trevor	Extinct 1824	created Viscount Hampden in 1776
Baron St John of Lydiard Tregoze	7 July 1712	St John	Extant	subsidiary title of Viscount Bolingbroke; also Baron St John of Battersea and Viscount St John since 1751
Baron Bingley	21 July 1713	Benson	Extinct 1731	

=== George I (1714–1727) ===
Title	Date of Creation	Surname	Current Status	Notes
Baron Carleton	19 October 1714	Boyle	Extinct 1725	
Baron Cobham	19 October 1714	Temple	Extinct 1749	created Baron Cobham and Viscount Cobham in 1718, which titles are extant
Baron Throwley	19 October 1714	Watson	Extinct 1746	created Earl of Rockingham at the same time
Baron Parker	10 March 1716	Parker	Extant	created Earl of Macclesfield in 1721
Baron Coningsby	18 June 1716	Coningsby	Extinct 1729	also Baron Coningsby of Clanbrassil in the Peerage of Ireland, which title became extinct in 1729; created Earl Coningsby in 1719, which title became extinct in 1761
Baron Onslow	19 June 1716	Onslow	Extant	created Earl of Onslow in the Peerage of the United Kingdom in 1801
Baron Torrington	20 June 1716	Newport	Extinct 1719	
Baron Cadogan of Reading	21 June 1716	Cadogan	Extinct 1726	created Baron Cadogan of Oakley in 1817, which title is extant and held by the Earl Cadogan (1800 creation); created Earl Cadogan in 1718, which title also became extinct in 1726
Baron Romney	22 June 1716	Romney	Extant	created Earl of Romney in the Peerage of the United Kingdom in 1801
Baron St John of Battersea	2 July 1716	St John	Extant	created Viscount St John at the same time; also Baron St John of Lydiard Tregoze and Viscount Bolingbroke since 1751
Baron Newburgh	10 July 1716	Cholmondeley	Extant	also Baron Newborough (created 1715) in the Peerage of Ireland; also Earl of Cholmondeley from 1725; created Marquess of Cholmondeley in the Peerage of the United Kingdom in 1815
Baroness of Hampton Court	26 January 1717	Newton	Extinct 1761	created Viscountess Coningsby at the same time; also Countess Coningsby from 1729 to 1761
Baron Pawlett of Basing	12 April 1717	Paulet	Extinct 1754	also Baron St John of Basing, Earl of Wiltshire and Marquess of Winchester in the Peerage of England from 1722 to 1754, which titles are extant; also Duke of Bolton in the Peerage of England from 1722 to 1754, which title became extinct in 1794
Baron Stanhope of Elvaston	3 July 1717	Stanhope	Extant	created Viscount Stanhope at the same time and Earl Stanhope in 1718, the latter title which became extinct in 1967; Barony and Viscountcy held by the Earl of Harrington since 1967
Baron Cobham	23 May 1718	Temple, Grenville, Grenville-Temple, Nugent-Temple-Grenville, Temple-Nugent-Brydges-Chandos-Grenville, Lyttelton	Extant	created Viscount Cobham at the same time; created Countess Temple in 1750 and Marquess of Buckingham in 1784, which titles became extinct in 1889; created Earl Temple of Stowe in the Peerage of the United Kingdom in 1822, which title is extant; created Marquess of Chandos and Duke of Buckingham and Chandos in the Peerage of the United Kingdom in 1822, which titles became extinct in 1889; also Earl Nugent in the Peerage of Ireland from 1788 to 1889; also Lord Kinloss in the Peerage of Scotland from 1868 to 1889; also Baron Westcote in the Peerage of Ireland and Baron Lyttelton in the Peerage of Great Britain since 1889
Baron Boscawen-Rose	9 June 1720	Boscawen	Extant	created Viscount Falmouth at the same time; created Earl of Falmouth in the Peerage of the United Kingdom in 1821, which title became extinct in 1852
Baron Ducie	9 June 1720	Moreton	extinct 1770	created Baron Ducie in 1763, which title is extant
Baron Wallop	11 June 1720	Wallop	Extant	Subsidiary title of the Viscount Lymington; created Earl of Portsmouth in 1743.
Baron Lechmere	4 September 1721	Lechmere	Extinct 1727	
Baron Byng	21 September 1721	Byng	Extant	created Viscount Torrington at the same time
Baroness Brentford	6 April 1722	von Platen-Hallermund	Extinct 1725	created Countess of Darlington at the same time
Baroness of Aldborough	7 April 1722	von der Schulenberg	Extinct 1778	created Countess of Walsingham at the same time; life peerages
Baron Graham	23 May 1722	Graham	Extant	created Earl Graham at the same time; also Duke of Montrose in the Peerage of Scotland since 1742
Baron Ker of Wakefield	24 May 1722	Ker, Innes-Ker	Extinct 1804	created Earl Ker at the same time; also Duke of Roxburgh from 1741 to 1804
Baron Percy	23 November 1722	Seymour, Percy, Stewart-Murray	Extant	also Duke of Somerset in the Peerage of England from 1748 to 1750; also Duke of Northumberland in the Peerage of Great Britain from 1776 to 1865 and since 1957; also Duke of Atholl in the Peerage of Scotland from 1865 to 1957
Baron Walpole	1 June 1723	Walpole	Extant	also Viscount Walpole and Earl of Orford from 1745 to 1797; also Baron Clinton from 1781 to 1791; also Baron Walpole of Wolterton since 1797; also Earl of Orford from 1806 to 1931
Baron King	29 May 1725	King, Noel-King	extinct 5 February 2018	created Earl of Lovelace in the Peerage of the United Kingdom in 1838; also Baron Wentworth from 1893 to 1906
Baron Snowdon	26 July 1726	–	Merged in crown 1760	created Duke of Edinburgh at the same time
Baron Alderney	27 July 1726	–	Extinct 1765	created Duke of Cumberland at the same time

=== George II (1727–1760) ===
Title	Date of Creation	Surname	Current Status	Notes
Baron Lovel	1728	Coke	Extinct 1759	created Earl of Leicester in 1744
Baron Malton	1728	Watson, Watson-Wentworth	Extinct 1782	created Baron Harrowden, Baron Wath, Viscount Higham and Earl of Malton in 1734; also Baron Rockingham in the Peerage of England from 1746; created Marquess of Rockingham in 1746; also Baron Malton and Earl Malton in the Peerage of Ireland from 1750
Baron Monson	1728	Monson	Extant	created Viscount Oxenbridge in the Peerage of the United Kingdom in 1886, which title became extinct in 1898
Baron Harrington of Elvaston	1730	Stanhope	Extant	created Earl of Harrington in 1742
Baron Raymond	1731	Raymond	Extinct 1753	
Baron Hardwicke	1733	Yorke	Extant	created Earl of Hardwicke in 1754
Baron Talbot of Hensol	1733	Talbot, Chetwynd-Talbot	Extant	created Earl Talbot in 1761, which title became extinct in 1782; created Baron Dynevor in 1780, which title separated from the barony in 1782; created Earl Talbot in 1784; also Earl of Shrewsbury and Earl of Waterford from 1856
Baron Wath	1733	Watson-Wentworth	Extinct 1782	subsidiary title of the Earl of Malton; created Marquess of Rockingham in 1746
Baron Godolphin	1735	Godolphin	Extinct 1785	also Baron Godolphin, Viscount Rialton and Earl of Godolphin until 1766, when these titles became extinct
Baroness Yarmouth	1740	de Walmoden	Extinct 1765	created Countess of Yarmouth at the same time; life peerages
Baron Chedworth	1741	Howe	Extinct 1804	
Baron Montfort of Horseheath	1741	Bromley	extinct 1851	
Baron Houghton	1742	Walpole	Extinct 1797	subsidiary title of the Earl of Orford
Baron Herbert of Chirbury and Ludlow	1743	Herbert	Extinct 1801	created Earl of Powis in 1748
Baron Ilchester	1741	Fox-Strangways	Extant	created Baron Ilchester and Stavordale in 1847 and Earl of Ilchester in 1756
Baron Edgcumbe	1742	Edgcumbe	Extant	created Viscount Mount Edgcumbe and Valletort in 1781 and Earl of Mount Edgcumbe in 1789
Baron Fitzwilliam of Milton	1742	Fitzwilliam, Wentworth-Fitzwilliam	Extinct 1979	also Baron Fitzwilliam, Viscount Milton and Earl Fitzwilliam in the Peerage of Ireland; created Earl Fitzwilliam of Norborough in the Peerage of Great Britain in 1746
Baron Hedon	1742	Pulteney	Extinct 1764	subsidiary title of the Earl of Bath
Baron Sandys	1743	Sandys	Extinct 1797	
Baron Bruce of Tottenham	1746	Bruce, Brudenell-Bruce	Extant	also Baron Bruce of Skelton, Baron Bruce of Whorlton, Viscount Bruce of Ampthill and Earl of Ailesbury in Peerage of England from 1746 to 1747, when these titles became extinct; also Lord Bruce of Kinloss, Lord Kinloss and Earl of Elgin in Peerage of Scotland from 1746 to 1747; created Earl of Ailesbury in Peerage of Great Britain in 1776 and Marquess of Ailesbury in the Peerage of the United Kingdom in 1821
Baron Fortescue	1746	Fortescue	Extant	created Earl Clinton at the same time, which title became extinct in 1751; created Earl Fortescue in 1789
Baron Anson	1747	Anson	Extinct 1762	
Baron Archer	1747	Archer	Extinct 1778	
Baron Feversham	1747	Duncombe	Extinct 1763	
Baron Ilchester and Stavordale	1747	Fox-Strangways	Extant	created Earl of Ilchester in 1756
Baron Longford	1747	Bouverie, Pleydell-Bouverie	Extant	created Viscount Folkestone at the same time; created Earl of Radnor in 1765
Baron Ravensworth	1747	Liddell	Extinct 1784	
Baron Powis	1748	Herbert	Extinct 1802	subsidiary title of the Earl of Powis
Baron Rolle	1748	Rolle	Extinct 1750	
Baron Herbert of Chirbury and Ludlow	1749	Herbert	Extinct 1802	also Earl of Powis
Baron Ponsonby of Sysonby	1749	Ponsonby	Extant	subsidiary title of the Earl of Bessborough in the Peerage of Ireland
Baron Warkworth	1749	Seymour, Percy, Percy-Seymour	Extant	created Earl of Northumberland at the same time; created Duke of Northumberland in 1766; also Duke of Somerset from 1749 to 1750
Baron Cockermouth	1749	Seymour, Wyndham	Extinct 1845	created Earl of Egremont at the same time; also Duke of Somerset from 1749 to 1750
Baron Vere of Hanworth	1750	Beauclerk	Extant	also Duke of St Albans since 1787
Baron Harwich	1756	Hill	Extant	subsidiary title of the Marquess of Downshire in the Peerage of Ireland
Baron Lyttelton	1756	Lyttelton	Extinct 1779	
Baron Mansfield	1756	Murray	Extinct 1793	created Earl of Mansfield in 1776 and 1792, which titles are extant
Baron Walpole of Wolterton	1756	Walpole	Extant	also Baron Walpole since 1797; also Earl of Orford from 1806 to 1931
Baron Henley	1760	Henley	Extinct 1786	created Earl of Northington in 1764
Baron Wycombe	1760	Petty, Petty-Fitzmaurice	Extant	subsidiary title of the Earl of Shelburne in the Peerage of the United Kingdom; created Marquess of Lansdowne in 1784; also Baron Kerry and Earl of Kerry in the Peerage of Ireland since 1818
Baroness Stawell	1760	Bilson-Legge	Extinct 1820	
Baron Sondes	1760	Watson, Milles, Milles-Lade	Extinct 1996	created Earl Sondes in 1880

=== George III (1760–1800) ===
Title	Date of Creation	Surname	Current Status	Notes
Baron Boston	1761	Irby	Extant	
Baron Grantham	1761	Robinson, de Grey	Extinct 1923	also Earl de Grey in the Peerage of the United Kingdom from 1833 to 1923; also Baron Lucas of Crudwell in the Peerage of England from 1833 to 1859; also Viscount Goderich and Earl of Ripon in the Peerage of the United Kingdom from 1859 to 1923; created Marquess of Ripon in the Peerage of the United Kingdom in 1871
Baron Grosvenor	1761	Grosvenor	Extant	created Earl Grosvenor in 1784; created Marquess of Westminster in 1831 and Duke of Westminster in 1874, both in the Peerage of the United Kingdom
Baron Melcombe	1761	Bubb Dodington	Extinct 1762	
Baroness Mount Stuart	1761	Montagu, Crichton-Stuart	Extant	also Earl of Bute in the Peerage of Scotland from 1794; created Marquess of Bute in 1796
Baron Scarsdale	1761	Curzon	Extant	created Viscount Scarsdale in the Peerage of the United Kingdom in 1911; created Baron Ravensdale in the Peerage of the United Kingdom in 1911, which title is extant and a separate peerage; created Baron Curzon of Kedleston in the Peerage of Ireland in 1898 and Earl Curzon of Kedleston in 1911 and Earl of Kedleston and Marquess Curzon of Kedleston in 1921 in the Peerage of the United Kingdom, which titles became extinct in 1925
Baron Spencer	1761	Spencer	Extant	created Earl Spencer in 1765
Baron Beaulieu	1762	Hussey-Montagu	Extinct 1802	created Earl of Beaulieu in 1784
Baron Bingley	1762	Fox-Lane	Extinct 1773	
Baron Lovel and Holland	1762	Perceval	Extinct 2011	subsidiary title of the Earl of Egmont in the Peerage of Ireland
Baron Montagu of Boughton	1762	Montagu	Extinct 1770	
Baron Pelham of Stanmer	1762	Pelham-Holles, Pelham	Extant	also Duke of Newcastle-upon-Tyne from 1762 to 1768, when this title became extinct; also Duke of Newcastle-under-Lyne from 1762 to 1768, when the two peerages separated (the Dukedom became extinct in 1988); created Earl of Chichester in the Peerage of the United Kingdom in 1801
Baron Vernon	1762	Venables-Vernon, Vernon-Harcourt	Extant	
Baron Ducie	1763	Moreton, Reynolds-Moreton	Extant	created Earl of Ducie in the Peerage of the United Kingdom in 1837
Baron Milton	1763	Damer	Extinct 1808	also Baron Milton in the Peerage of Ireland; created Earl of Dorchester in 1792
Baron Camden	1765	Pratt	Extant	created Earl Camden in 1786 and Marquess Camden in the Peerage of the United Kingdom in 1812
Baron Digby	1765	Digby	Extant	also Baron Digby in the Peerage of Ireland; created Earl Digby in 1790, which title became extinct in 1856
Baron Pleydell-Bouverie	1765	Pleydell-Bouverie	Extant	created Earl of Radnor at the same time
Baron Sundridge	1766	Campbell	Extant	also Duke of Argyll in the Peerage of Scotland from 1770
Baroness Greenwich	1767	Townshend	Extinct 1797	
Baron Amherst	1776	Amherst	Extinct 1797	also created Baron Amherst in 1788, which title became extinct in 1993
Baron Brownlow	1776	Cust, Egerton-Cust	Extant	created Earl Brownlow in the Peerage of the United Kingdom 1815, which title became extinct in 1921
Baron Cardiff	1776	Crichton-Stuart	Extant	also Earl of Bute in the Peerage of Scotland from 1792; created Marquess of Bute in 1796
Baron Cranley	1776	Onslow	Extant	also Baron Onslow from 1776; created Earl of Onslow in the Peerage of the United Kingdom in 1801
Baron Foley	1776	Foley	Extant	
Baroness Hamilton of Hameldon	1776	Campbell, Hamilton	Extant	also Duke of Hamilton in the Peerage of Scotland from 1793 to 1799; also Duke of Argyll in the Peerage of Scotland since 1806
Baron Hawke	1776	Hawke, Harvey-Hawke	Extant	
Baron Harrowby	1776	Ryder	Extant	created Earl of Harrowby in 1809 in the Peerage of the United Kingdom
Baron Hume of Berwick	1776	Hume-Campbell	Extinct 1781	
Baron Rivers	1776	Pitt, Pitt-Rivers	Extinct 1828	also created Baron Rivers in the Peerage of the United Kingdom in 1802, which title became extinct in 1880
Baron Thurlow	1778	Thurlow	Extinct 1806	also created Baron Thurlow in 1792, which title is extant
Baron Bagot	1780	Bagot	Extant	
Baron Brudenell of Deene	1780	Brudenell, Brudenell-Bruce	Extinct 1811	also Earl of Cardigan in the Peerage of England 1790-1811
Baron Dynevor	1780	Talbot, de Cardonnel, Rice, Rice-Trevor, Rhys	Extant	also Baron Talbot and Earl Talbot from 1780 to 1782, which titles are now held by the Earl of Shrewsbury and Waterford
Baron Gage	1780	Gage	Extinct 1791	subsidiary title of the Viscount Gage in the Peerage of Ireland; also created Baron Gage in 1790, which title is extant
Baron Loughborough	1780	Wedderburn, St Clair-Erskine	Extinct 1805	created Baron Loughborough in the Peerage of Great Britain in 1795 and Earl of Rosslyn in the Peerage of the United Kingdom in 1801, which titles are extant
Baron Southampton	1780	FitzRoy	Extant	
Baron Walsingham	1780	de Grey	Extant	
Baron Montagu of Boughton	1781	Montagu	Extinct 1845	
Baron Ashburton	1782	Dunning	Extinct 1823	
Baron Grantley	1782	Norton	Extant	
Baron Rodney	1782	Rodney	Extant	
Baron Bolebrooke	1782	Sackville, Germain	Extinct 1843	subsidiary title of the Viscount Sackville; succeeded as Duke of Dorset in 1815, which title became extinct in 1843
Baron Rawdon	1783	Rawdon, Rawdon-Hastings	Extinct 1868	subsidiary title of the Earl of Moira in the Peerage of Ireland; created Marquess of Hastings in the Peerage of the United Kingdom in 1816
Baron Sydney	1783	Townshend	Extinct 1890	created Viscount Sydney in 1789 and Earl Sydney in the Peerage of the United Kingdom in 1874
Baron Berwick	1784	Hill, Noel-Hill	Extinct 1953	
Baron Boringdon	1784	Parker	Extant	created Earl of Morley in 1815
Baron Bulkeley	1784	Bulkeley	Extinct 1822	also Viscount Bulkeley in Peerage of Ireland
Baron Lowther	1784	Lowther	Extinct 1802	created Viscount Lonsdale in 1784 and Earl of Lonsdale in 1785, which titles also became extinct in 1802; created Baron Lowther and Viscount Lowther in 1797, which titles are extant and held by the Earl of Lonsdale (1807 creation)
Baron Sherborne	1784	Dutton	Extinct 1985	
Baron Somers	1784	Cocks, Somers-Cocks	Extant	created Earl Somers in the Peerage of the United Kingdom in 1821, which title became extinct in 1883
Baron Camelford	1784	Pitt	Extinct 1804	
Baron Carteret	1784	Carteret, Thynne	Extinct 1849	
Baron Eliot	1784	Eliot	Extant	created Earl of St Germans in the Peerage of the United Kingdom in 1815
Baron Gordon of Huntley	1784	Gordon	Extinct 1836	created Earl of Norwich at the same time; also Marquess of Huntly in the Peerage of Scotland from 1784 to 1836, which title is extant; also Duke of Gordon in the Peerage of Scotland from 1784 to 1836, when this title became extinct
Baron Lovaine	1784	Percy, Percy-Seymour	Extant	created Earl of Beverley in 1790; also Duke of Northumberland from 1784 to 1786 and since 1865
Baron Carleton	1786	Boyle	Extant	subsidiary title of the Earl of Shannon in the Peerage of Ireland
Baron Delaval	1786	Delaval	Extinct 1808	also Baron Delaval in the Peerage of Ireland
Baron Dorchester	1786	Carleton	Extinct 1897	
Baron Douglas of Amesbury	1786	Douglas	Extinct 1810	
Baron Hawkesbury	1786	Jenkinson	Extinct 1851	created Earl of Liverpool in 1796
Baron Montagu	1786		Extinct 1845	also Earl of Cardigan in the Peerage of England from 1786 to 1790, which title is extant and now held by the Marquess of Ailesbury; also Duke of Montagu from 1786 to 1790, when this title became extinct
Baron Murray of Stanley	1786	Murray, Stewart Murray	Extinct 1957	created Earl Strange at the same time; subsidiary titles of the Duke of Atholl in the Peerage of Scotland
Baron Suffield	1786	Harbord, Harbord-Hamond	Extant	
Baron Tyrone	1786	Beresford	Extant	subsidiary title of the Earl of Tyrone in the Peerage of Ireland; created Marquess of Waterford in the Peerage of Ireland in 1789
Baron Heathfield	1787	Heathfield	Extinct 1813	
Baron Kenyon	1788	Kenyon, Tyrell-Kenyon	Extant	
Baron Amherst	1788	Amherst	Extinct 1993	also Baron Amherst (created 1776), which title became extinct in 1797; created Earl Amherst in the Peerage of the United Kingdom in 1826
Baron Braybrooke	1788	Griffin, Neville	Extant	
Baron Dover	1788	Yorke	Extinct 1792	
Baron Howe	1788	Howe, Curzon, Curzon-Howe	Extant	also Baron Glenawley and Viscount Howe in the Peerage of Ireland from 1788 to 1799; also Earl Howe in the Peerage of Great Britain from 1788 to 1799, when this title became extinct; also Baron Curzon of Penn in the Peerage of Great Britain and Viscount Curzon and Earl Howe in the Peerage of the United Kingdom from 1835
Baron Malmesbury	1788	Harris	Extant	created Earl of Malmesbury in 1800
Baron Douglas	1790	Douglas	Extinct 1857	
Baron Fife	1790	Duff	Extinct 1809	subsidiary title of the Earl Fife in the Peerage of Ireland, which title became extinct or dormant in 1912
Baron Fisherwick	1790	Chichester	Extant	subsidiary title of the Marquess of Donegall in the Peerage of Ireland
Baron Gage	1790	Gage, Hall	Extant	subsidiary title of the Viscount Gage in the Peerage of Ireland
Baron Grenville	1790	Grenville	Extinct 1834	
Baron Harewood	1790	Lascelles	Extinct 1795	
Baron Mulgrave	1790	Phipps	extinct 1794	also Baron Mulgrave in Peerage of Ireland, which title is extant and held by the Marquess of Normanby
Baron Verulam	1790	Grimston	Extant	also Viscount Grimston in the Peerage of Ireland; created Earl of Verulam in the Peerage of the United Kingdom in 1815
Baron Douglas of Lochleven	1791	Douglas	Extinct 1827	subsidiary title of the Earl of Morton in the Peerage of Scotland
Baroness Bath	1792	Murray-Pulteney	Extinct 1808	created Countess of Bath in the Peerage of the United Kingdom in 1803
Baron Thurlow	1792	Thurlow, Hovell-Thurlow, Hovell-Thurlow-Cumming-Bruce	Extant	
Baron Auckland	1793	Eden	Extant	also Baron Auckland in the Peerage of Ireland; created Earl of Auckland in the Peerage of the United Kingdom in 1839, which title became extinct in 1849
Baron Bradford	1794	Bridgeman	Extant	created Earl of Bradford in the Peerage of the United Kingdom in 1815
Baron Clive of Walcot	1794	Clive, Herbert	Extant	also Baron Clive of Plassey in Peerage of Ireland; created Earl of Powis in the Peerage of the United Kingdom in 1804
Baron Curzon of Penn	1794	Howe, Curzon, Curzon-Howe	Extant	created Viscount Curzon in 1802 and Earl Howe in 1821 in the Peerage of the United Kingdom, also Baron Howe in the Peerage of Great Britain from 1835
Baron Dundas	1794	Dundas	Extant	created Earl of Zetland in 1838 and Marquess of Zetland in 1892, both in the Peerage of the United Kingdom
Baron Lyttelton	1794	Lyttelton	Extant	also Baron Westcote in the Peerage of Ireland; also Baron Cobham and Viscount Cobham since 1889
Baron Mendip	1794	Ellis,	Extant	also Baron Clifden and Viscount Clifden in Peerage of Ireland from 1802 to 1974, when these titles became extinct; also Baron Dover in the Peerage of the United Kingdom from 1836 to 1899, when this title became extinct; also Baron Robartes in the Peerage of the United Kingdom from 1899 to 1974, when this title became extinct; title held by the Earl of Normanton since 1974
Baron Mulgrave	1794	Phipps	Extant	created Earl of Mulgrave in 1812 and Marquess of Normanby in 1838, both in the Peerage of the United Kingdom
Baron Selsey	1794	Peachey	Extinct 1838	
Baron Upper Ossory	1794	Fitzpatrick	Extinct 1818	subsidiary title of the Earl of Upper Ossory in the Peerage of Ireland
Baron Yarborough	1794	Anderson-Pelham, Pelham	Extant	created Earl of Yarborough in the Peerage of the United Kingdom in 1837
Baroness Hood	1795	Hood	Extant	also Viscount Hood in the Peerage of Great Britain from 1816
Baron Loughborough	1795	Wedderburn, St Clair-Erskin	Extant	created Earl of Rosslyn in the Peerage of the United Kingdom in 1801
Baron Bridport	1796	Hood	Extinct 1814	created Viscount Bridport in 1814, which title also became extinct in 1814; also Baron Bridport (created 1794) in Peerage of Ireland, which title is extant and held by the Viscount Bridport (1868 creation)
Baron Brodrick	1796	Brodrick	Extant	also Viscount Midleton in the Peerage of Ireland; created Earl of Midleton in the Peerage of the United Kingdom in 1920, which title became extinct in 1979
Baron Calthorpe	1796	Gough-Calthorpe, Gough	Extinct 1997	
Baron Dawnay	1796	Dawnay	Extinct 1832	subsidiary title of the Viscount Downe in the Peerage of Ireland
Baron Gwydyr	1796	Burrell, Drummond-Burrell, Drummond-Willoughby	Extinct 1915	also Baron Willoughby de Eresby from 1828 to 1870
Baron Harewood	1796	Lascelles	Extant	created Earl of Harewood in the Peerage of the United Kingdom in 1812
Baron Macartney	1796	Macartney	Extinct 1806	also Earl Macartney in the Peerage of Ireland
Baron Rolle	1796	Rolle	Extinct 1842	
Baron Rous	1796	Rous	Extant	created Earl of Stradbroke in the Peerage of the United Kingdom in 1821
Baron Stewart	1796	Stewart	Extant	Subsidiary title of the Earl of Galloway in the Peerage of Scotland
Baron Stuart	1796	Stuart	Extant	Subsidiary title of the Earl of Moray in the Peerage of Scotland
Baron Cawdor	1796	Campbell	Extant	created Earl Cawdor in the Peerage of the United Kingdom in 1827
Baron de Dunstanville	1796	Basset	Extinct 1835	created Baron Basset in 1797, which title became extinct in 1855
Baron Saltersford	1796	Stopford	extant	subsidiary title of the Earl of Courtown
Baron Pierrepont	1796	Pierrepont	Extinct 1955	created Viscount Newark at the same time and Earl Manvers in the Peerage of the United Kingdom in 1806
Baron Delamer	1796	Grey	extinct 1883	created Earl of Warrington at the same time; also Baron Grey of Groby and Earl of Stamford from 1796 to 1883
Baron Basset	1797	Basset	Extinct 1855	also Baron de Dunstanville, which title became extinct in 1835
Baron Duncan of Lundie	1797	Haldane-Duncan	Extinct 1933	created Viscount Duncan of Camperdown at the same time; created Earl of Camperdown in the Peerage of the United Kingdom in 1831
Baron Jervis	1797	Jervis	Extinct 1823	created Earl St Vincent at the same time, which title also became extinct in 1823; created Viscount St Vincent in the Peerage of the United Kingdom in 1801, which title is extant
Baron Bayning	1797	Townshend	Extinct 1866	
Baron Bolton	1797	Orde-Powlett	Extant	
Baron Carrington	1797	Smith, Carrington, Wynn-Carington, Carington	Extant	also Baron Carrington in the Peerage of Ireland; created Earl Carrington in 1895 and Marquess of Lincolnshire in 1912, both in the Peerage of the United Kingdom, which titles became extinct in 1928; created Baron Carington of Upton for life in 1999 in the Peerage of the United Kingdom
Baron Perth	1797	Drummond	Extinct 1800	
Baron Glastonbury	1797	Grenville	Extinct 1825	
Baron Lilford	1797	Powys	Extant	
Baron Lowther	1797	Lowther	Extant	also Viscount Lonsdale (created 1784) and Earl of Lonsdale (created 1785), which titles became extinct in 1802; created Viscount Lowther in the Peerage of Great Britain in 1797 and Earl of Lonsdale in the Peerage of the United Kingdom in 1807
Baron Minto	1797	Elliot-Murray-Kynynmound	Extant	created Earl of Minto in the Peerage of the United Kingdom in 1813
Baron Northwick	1797	Rushout	Extinct 1887	
Baron Perth	1797	Drummond	Extinct 1800	created for the de jure 11th Earl of Perth
Baron Ribblesdale	1797	Lister	Extinct 1925	
Baron Seaforth	1797	Mackenzie	Extinct 1815	
Baron Wellesley	1797	Wellesley	Extinct 1842	subsidiary title of the Earl of Mornington in the Peerage of Ireland, which title is extant and held by the Duke of Wellington since 1863; created Marquess Wellesley in 1799
Baron Wodehouse	1797	Wodehouse	Extant	created Earl of Kimberley in the Peerage of the United Kingdom in 1866
Baron Nelson	1798	Nelson	Extinct 1805	created Viscount Nelson in the Peerage of the United Kingdom in 1801, which title also became extinct in 1805; created Baron Nelson in the Peerage of the United Kingdom in 1801, which title is extant and held by the Earl Nelson since 1805
Baron Eldon	1799	Scott	Extant	created Earl of Eldon in the Peerage of the United Kingdom in 1821
Baron FitzGibbon	1799	FitzGibbon	Extinct 1864	subsidiary title of the Earl of Clare in the Peerage of Ireland

== See also ==
- List of Baronies in the Peerage of England
- List of Lordships of Parliament (for Scotland)
- List of Baronies in the Peerage of Ireland
- List of hereditary Baronies in the Peerage of the United Kingdom
