= Lord Milton =

Lord Milton may refer to:

- Andrew Fletcher, Lord Milton (1692–1766), a Scottish judge and Lord Justice Clerk
- Joseph Damer, 1st Baron Milton (1718–1798) British MP, created Baron Milton of Shrone Hill, Tipperary, Ireland, on 30 May 1753 and Baron Milton of Milton Abbey on 10 May 1762. In 1792 he was made Viscount Milton, of Milton Abbey in the County of Dorset, at the same time he became Earl of Dorchester.
- A subsidiary title of the Earl of Dorchester
