= Josh Ovens =

English rugby union player

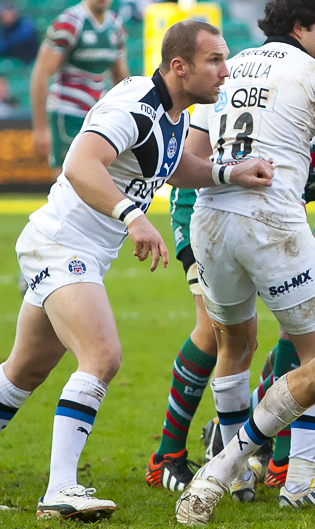
- Born: 11 July 1989 (age 37) Trowbridge, Wiltshire
- Height: 1.88 m (6 ft 2 in)
- Weight: 96 kg (15 st 2 lb)
- School: Monkton Combe School; Milton Abbey School
- University: University of Bath
- Notable relative: Laurence Ovens (cousin)

Rugby union career
- Position: Flanker
Senior career
Years	Team	Apps	(Points)
2008–2014	Bath	33	(12)
2009–2010	→ Newbury (loan)	5	(10)
2011–2012	→ Bristol (loan)	21	(10)
2014–2016	Bristol	5	(10)
2016	→ London Welsh (loan)	1	(0)
2016–2018	Rosslyn Park	30	(15)
International career
Years	Team	Apps	(Points)
2009	England U20	3	(5)

Joshua James McLaren Ovens (born 11 July 1989) is an English former rugby union player who played as a flanker.

== Education ==
Ovens was educated at the Prep School for Monkton Combe School, an independent school for boys and girls up to the age of 13 in Combe Down, a village on the edge of Bath in Somerset. After Monkton Prep, he went to Milton Abbey School, an independent day and boarding school in Milton Abbas, near Blandford Forum in Dorset.

== Rugby career ==
In 2008, Ovens joined Bath, and went on loan to Newbury in the 2008–09 season, where the club won the Berks/Bucks & Oxon Premier. He later had a spell on loan to Bristol in the 2011 Aviva Championship season, before returning to Bath for the start of the 2012 season. He re-signed with Bristol on a one-year deal after the club facilitated his rehabilitation by allowing him to train with the squad, almost two years after recovering from a potentially career-ending back injury in 2012. Ovens returned to the field in August 2014 against Clifton RFC for the annual pre-season friendly match between the two sides. In March 2016, he went on loan to London Welsh until the end of the season.

After falling out of favour at Bristol, Ovens decided to combine part-time work at his family farm with part-time rugby for Rosslyn Park, where he joined former senior players such as Hugo Ellis and Mark Lilley, dropping down a division to prepare for a future career outside rugby. Ovens has left the door open to returning to professional rugby, continuing to work part-time on his farm while training two days a week before Saturday match days.
