= Aughrim =

Aughrim or Eachroim (literally "horse ridge" in Irish) is the name of a number of villages in Ireland:

- Aughrim, County Galway, a village in County Galway, scene of the Battle of Aughrim
- Aughrim, County Wicklow, a village in County Wicklow, Republic of Ireland
- Aughrim, County Cavan, a townland in County Cavan, Republic of Ireland
- Aughrim, County Down, a townland in County Down, Northern Ireland
- Aughrim, County Fermanagh, a townland in County Fermanagh, Northern Ireland
- Aughrim, County Londonderry, a townland in County Londonderry, Northern Ireland
- Aughrim, County Roscommon, a civil parish in County Roscommon, Republic of Ireland

== Other uses ==
- Aughrim Park, Gaelic Athletic Association stadium in Aughrim, County Wicklow
- Baron Aghrim, a title created twice in the Peerage of Ireland
- Battle of Aughrim, decisive battle of the Williamite War in 1691
- River Aughrim in County Wicklow
- Aughrim Ringforts, archaeological sites
- The Lass of Aughrim, an Irish version of the song The Lass of Roch Royal
