= Terence Nugent, 1st Baron Nugent =

British Army officer and courtier (1895–1973)

Lieutenant Colonel The Right Honourable The Lord Nugent GCVO MC
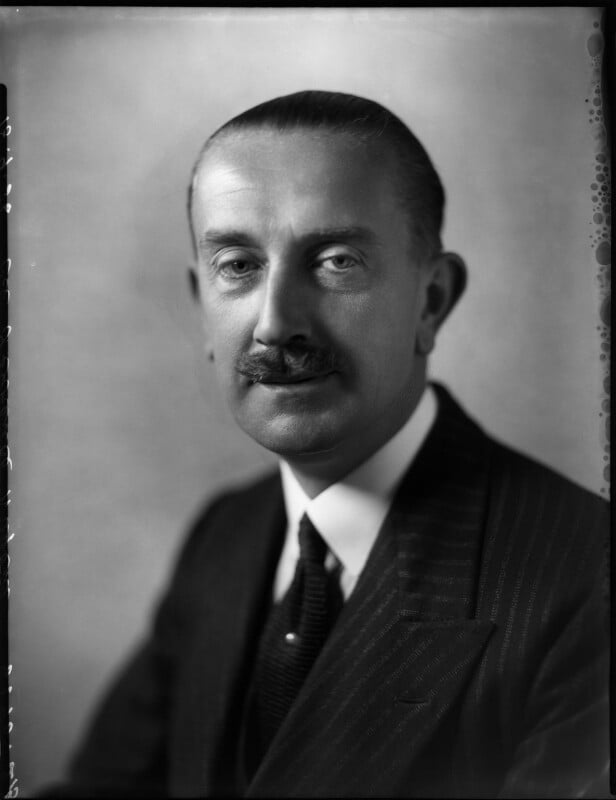
- Nugent in 1936
- Born: 11 August 1895
- Died: 27 April 1973 (aged 77)
- Alma mater: Royal Military College, Sandhurst
- Military career
- Allegiance: United Kingdom
- Rank: Lieutenant colonel
- Unit: Irish Guards
- Conflicts: First World War
- Awards: Military Cross; Mentioned in dispatches

Lieutenant-Colonel Terence Edmund Gascoigne Nugent, 1st Baron Nugent, GCVO, MC (11 August 1895 – 27 April 1973) was a British soldier and courtier. He was known Sir Terence Nugent between 1945 and 1960.

== Background, education and military career ==
Nugent was the younger son of Brigadier General George Colborne Nugent, eldest son of Sir Edmund Charles Nugent, 3rd Baronet, of Waddesdon (see Nugent Baronets), who was killed in action in 1915. His mother was Isabel Mary Bulwer, daughter of General Sir Edward Gascoigne Bulwer. Sir Guy Nugent, 4th Baronet, was his elder brother. He was educated at Eton and the Royal Military College, Sandhurst. He fought in the First World War as a major in the Irish Guards, was mentioned in dispatches, wounded and awarded the Military Cross. He was promoted to lieutenant-colonel in 1936.

== Career as courtier ==
Nugent was appointed Equerry to the Duke of York (the future George VI) in 1927, a post he held until 1936. He subsequently served as Comptroller of the Lord Chamberlain's Office between 1936 and 1960 and as an Extra Equerry to George VI between 1937 and 1952 and to Elizabeth II between 1952 and 1960. He was made a Member of the Royal Victorian Order (MVO) in 1927, promoted to Commander (CVO) in 1937, to Knight Commander (KCVO) in 1945 and to Knight Grand Cross (GCVO) in 1952. In 1960 he was elevated to the peerage as Baron Nugent, of West Harling in the County of Norfolk. He was also made a Grand Officer of the Legion of Honour the same year. From 1960 to 1973 he was a Permanent Lord-in-waiting to Elizabeth II.

== Cricket ==
Nugent appeared for the Eton XI before the First World War and following it was a regular club cricketer, most frequently playing for the Household Brigade team. In 1920, he made one appearance for Norfolk in a Minor Counties Championship match against Hertfordshire. He served as president of the Marylebone Cricket Club in 1962–63 and took the same role at Surrey County Cricket Club for three years in the late 1960s.

== Personal life ==
Lord Nugent married Rosalie Heathcote-Drummond-Willoughby, daughter of Brigadier-General the Honourable Charles Strathavon Heathcote-Drummond-Willoughby, in 1935. They had no children. He died in April 1973, aged 77, when the barony became extinct. Lady Nugent died on 20 July 1994.

Peerage of the United Kingdom
New creation	Baron Nugent; 1960–1973	Extinct
