= Milton, Dorset =

Coordinates: 51.0574°N 2.2975°W

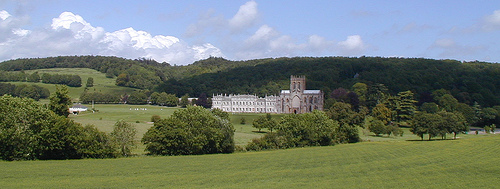
Milton Abbey School

The former town of Milton (or Middleton) in Dorset, England was cleared by the local landowner, Joseph Damer, Lord Milton, in the 1770s. This was a result of a fashion amongst English landowners to improve the amenity of their homes by converting surrounding farmland into open parkland. Where buildings were deemed to spoil the view, they were removed, including villages and towns, as in the case of Milton.

Damer's former residence, Milton Abbey, is now occupied by Milton Abbey School.

== History ==
A church, dedicated to Saint Sampson, was founded at Milton in the reign of King Athelstan (who also granted an annual fair). It was said to be a gesture of atonement for the death of the King's brother, Edwin, in 933 and it was endowed with relics. In 964, the church was handed over to the Benedictines and a monastery was established there until 11 March 1539, when closed during the general Dissolution of the Monasteries by Henry VIII. Henry subsequently sold the estate to John Tregonwell in February, 1540. A grammar school was established on the site in 1521. The town of Milton, Massachusetts, incorporated in 1662, was named for Milton; it is one of a number of settlements in that part of Massachusetts named for Dorset towns.

After several changes of ownership, the estate, including the town, the former monastery and its church were acquired in 1752 by Joseph Damer. Milton was a market town with almshouses, a grammar school, brewery, prosperous traders and inns. Nonetheless, having persuaded, by what means is not always clear, the inhabitants to vacate (many were rehoused at the nearby new settlement of Milton Abbas), Damer had the entire town demolished. This was substantially complete by 1776. A remaining tenant, William Harrison, successfully resisted the clearance and Damer had to wait for his death.

Institutions such as the almshouses were moved to Milton Abbas, as were materials from demolished buildings, but the grammar school survived until 1785 when an Act of Parliament sponsored by Damer obliged the school to move to Blandford Forum.
