= Agostino Carlini =

Italian sculptor and painter (c.1718–1790)

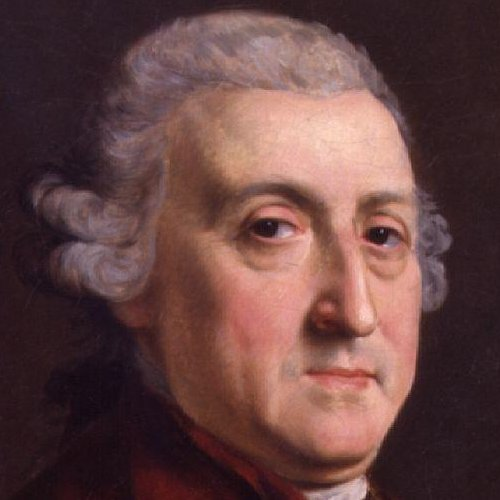
Carlini (detail from a larger painting)

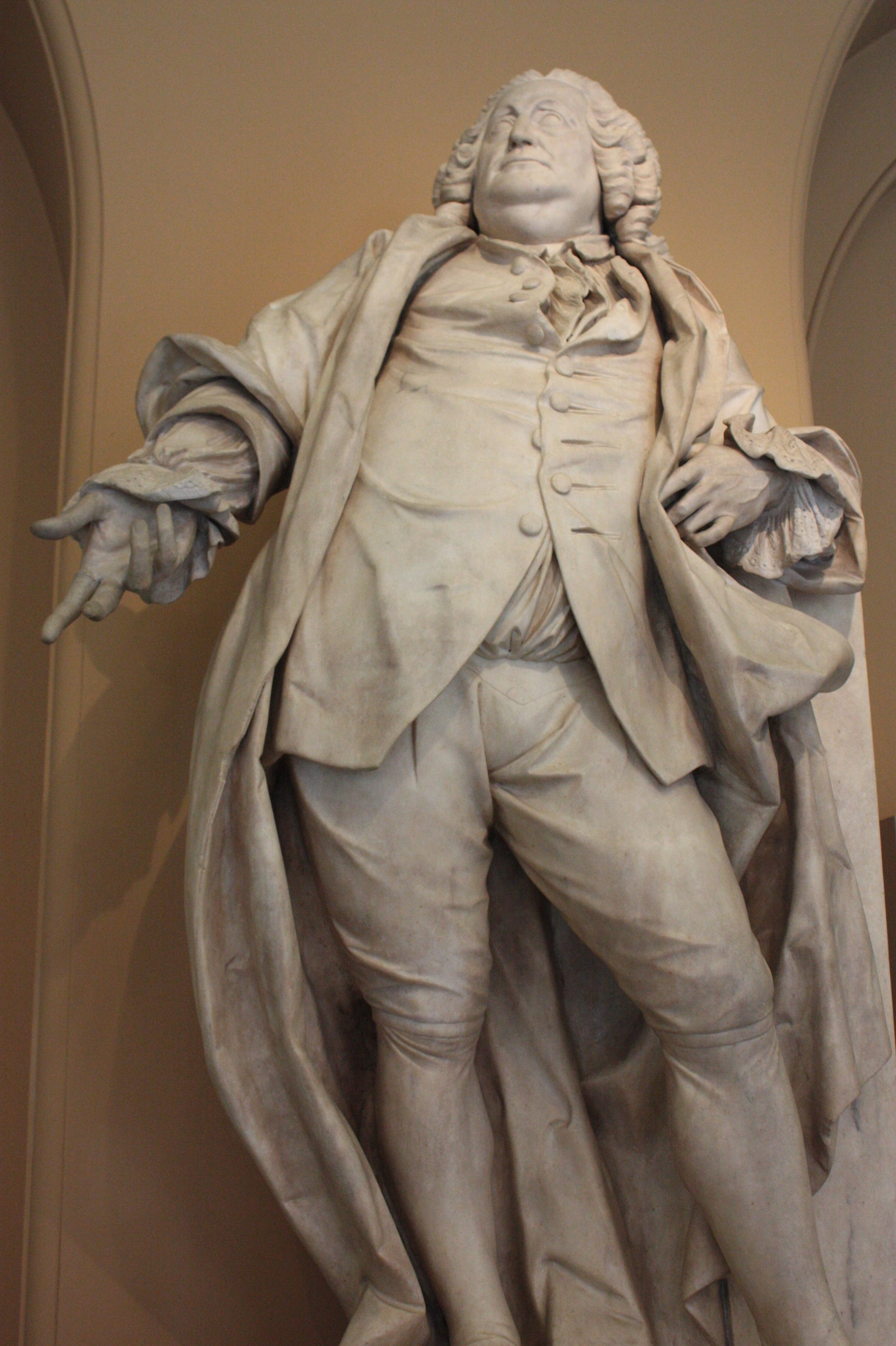
Joshua Ward by Agostini Carlini, c. 1760, Victoria and Albert Museum

Augostino Carlini or Agostino Carlini RA (c. 1718 – 15 August 1790) was an Italian sculptor and painter, who was born in Genoa but settled in England. He was also one of the founding members of the Royal Academy in 1768.

== Life ==
He features in a group portrait, by Johann Zoffany, of the founders, and is one of three sitters (with Francesco Bartolozzi and Giovanni Battista Cipriani) in a 1777 portrait displayed in the National Portrait Gallery in London. He was Keeper of the Royal Academy from 1783 until his death in 1790. He exhibited a portrait in oil in 1776.

He worked, with fellow Italian sculptor Giuseppe Ceracchi at Somerset House, and on statues at Custom House in Dublin. He is particularly noted for various church monuments, including a memorial to Lady Sophia Petty at All Saints' Parish Church, High Wycombe, Buckinghamshire, and one commissioned by Joseph Damer in 1775 to commemorate his wife Caroline, which stands in the north transept of Milton Abbey in Dorset.

Also in 1775, Carlini was commissioned by Dr William Hunter, the first Professor of Anatomy at the Royal Academy schools, to make a cast of the flayed corpse of a recently executed smuggler. The figure was posed as a Roman statue, the "Dying Gaul", and given the pseudo-classical title "Smugglerius".

He died unmarried at Carlisle Street, London, leaving all his estate to "Elizabeth Watton, spinster", his maid and housekeeper.

== Works ==
- Statue of his friend, Dr Joseph Ward (1760) (now in the Victoria and Albert Museum)
- Statuary group, "Maritime Power and Riches" (1768) (several copies, including the Royal Academy, London and Windsor Castle)
- Monument to the Countess of Shelbourne, High Wycombe (1771)
- Statue of Lady Bingley, Bramham Park (1771)
- Bust of George III, Burlington House (1773)
- Monument to the Earl and Countess of Dorchester, Milton Abbey (1775)
- Various statues for Somerset House (1776–78)
- Eight statues for Dublin Custom House (1783) (destroyed in the uprising of 1916)
