= Viscount Milton =

Viscountcy in the Peerage of Great Britain

The titles of Baron Milton and Viscount Milton have both been created several times.

== Sydney family ==
The first creation was for Henry Sydney, who was created Viscount Sydney of Sheppey and Baron Milton (i.e. Milton in Kent) in the Peerage of England on 9 September 1689. He was later further created Earl of Romney. He had no children so the titles became extinct on his death on 8 April 1704.

== Fitzwilliam family ==
The next creation was for William Fitzwilliam, 3rd Lord Fitzwilliam and Baron of Lifford in the Peerage of Ireland. He was created Earl Fitzwilliam and Viscount Milton (i.e. Milltown in County Westmeath), again in the Peerage of Ireland, on 21 July 1716. His grandson the third Earl Fitzwilliam was created Earl Fitzwilliam and Viscount Milton (i.e. Milton in what was then Northamptonshire) in the Peerage of Great Britain on 6 September 1746. All the titles became extinct on the death of the tenth Earl Fitzwilliam on 21 September 1979.

== Damer family ==
The final creations were for Joseph Damer. He was created Baron Milton of Shronell, County Tipperary in the Peerage of Ireland on 3 June 1753, Baron Milton of Milton Abbey, Dorset in the Peerage of Great Britain on 10 May 1762, and Viscount Milton of Milton Abbey and Earl of Dorchester on 18 May 1792. These titles became extinct on the death of his son on 7 March 1808.
