= Laurence Ovens =

English rugby union player

- Born: Laurence William Ovens; 6 September 1985 (age 41) Bath, Somerset
- Height: 1.85 m (6 ft 1 in)
- Weight: 113 kg (17 st 11 lb)
- School: St Laurence, Bradford-on-Avon
- University: Milfield
- Notable relative: Josh Ovens

Rugby union career
- Position: Prop
- Current team: Avonvale
Senior career
Years	Team	Apps	(Points)
2004–2009	Bath Rugby	21	(0)
2009–2010	Newcastle Falcons	15	(10)
2010–2011	Bedford Blues	10	(0)
2011–2014	Rosslyn Park	54	(10)
2015–	Avonvale	4	(5)
- Correct as of 21 November 2015

Laurence William Ovens (born 6 September 1985) is an English rugby union player who plays as a prop for Avonvale.

== Career ==
After five seasons with Bath Rugby (2004–2009), he signed for Newcastle Falcons.

In July 2010, Ovens signed for the Bedford Blues, giving him an opportunity to play every week for a promising championship side. He left the club ahead of the 2011/12 campaign.

For the 2011/12 season, Ovens joined Rosslyn Park. He spent three seasons there, leaving ahead of the 2014/15 season.

== Personal life ==
Ovens is married with three children. His first cousin is Josh Ovens.
