= Baron Nugent =

Historical title in Ireland and UK

Baron Nugent is a title that has been created three times, twice in the Peerage of Ireland and once in the Peerage of the United Kingdom. All three creations are extinct. The first creation came in the Peerage of Ireland in 1767 in favour of Robert Craggs-Nugent, who was made Viscount Clare at the same time. In 1776 he was further honoured when he was made Earl Nugent. For further history of this creation, see Earl Nugent and Viscount Cobham. The second creation came in the Peerage of Ireland in 1800 when Mary, Marchioness of Buckingham, was made Baroness Nugent, of Carlanstown in the county of Westmeath, with remainder to her second son Lord George Nugent-Grenville. She was the daughter of the first Earl Nugent and the wife of George Nugent-Temple-Grenville, 1st Marquess of Buckingham. She was succeeded according to the special remainder by her younger son, Lord George, the second Baron. The title became extinct on his death in 1850. The third creation came in the Peerage of the United Kingdom on 22 August 1960 when Terence Nugent was made Baron Nugent, of West Harling in the county of Norfolk. This creation became extinct on his death in 1973.

== Baron Nugent; First creation (1767) ==
- see Earl Nugent and Viscount Cobham

== Baron Nugent; Second creation (1800) ==
- Mary Elizabeth Nugent, Marchioness of Buckingham and 1st Baroness Nugent (died 1812)
- George Nugent-Grenville, 2nd Baron Nugent (1789–1850)

== Baron Nugent; Third creation (1960) ==
- Terence Edmund Gascoigne Nugent, 1st Baron Nugent (1895–1973)

== See also ==
- Earl Nugent
- Viscount Cobham
- Baron Nugent of Riverston
- Baron Nugent of Guildford
