= Milton Abbas =

Village in Dorset, England

Coordinates: 50.8152°N 2.2762°W

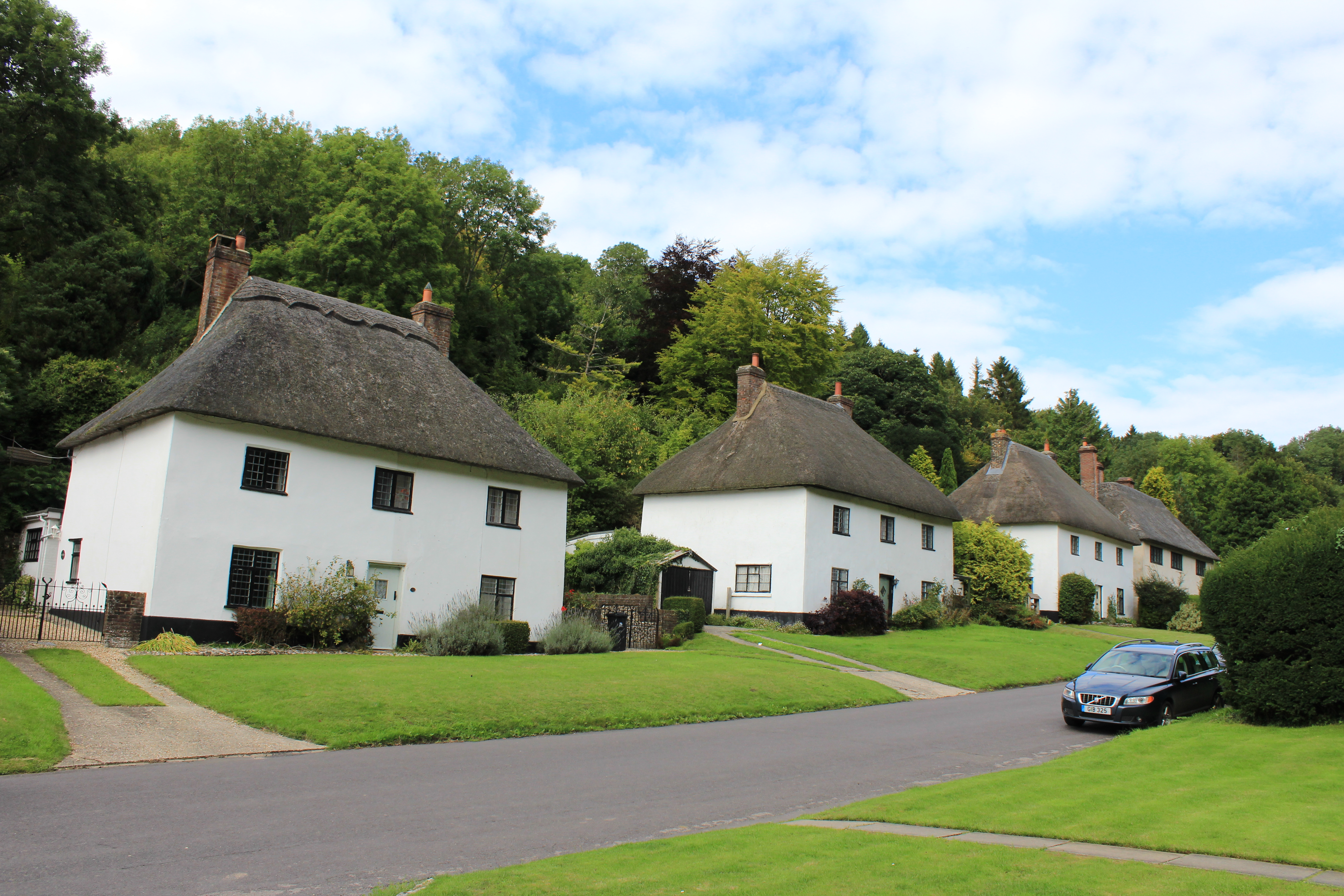
- Milton Abbas

- Location within Dorset
- Population: 729 (2021)
- OS grid reference: ST806018
- Civil parish: Milton Abbas
- Unitary authority: Dorset
- Ceremonial county: Dorset
- Region: South West
- Country: England
- Sovereign state: United Kingdom
- Post town: Blandford Forum
- Postcode district: DT11
- Dialling code: 01258
- Police: Dorset
- Fire: Dorset and Wiltshire
- Ambulance: South Western
- UK Parliament: North Dorset

Milton Abbas is a village and civil parish in Dorset, England, lying around 5 miles (8 kilometres) southwest of Blandford Forum. In the 2021 census the civil parish had a population of 729.

This planned community was built after the old town was demolished in the 1770s, said to be "the largest such project in England at the time".

== History ==
In 1780, Joseph Damer, Lord Milton, the first Earl of Dorchester and owner of Milton Abbey, decided that the adjacent market town, Middleton, was disturbing his vision of rural peace. He commissioned architect Sir William Chambers and landscape gardener Capability Brown (both of whom had already worked on the Abbey building and grounds) to design a new village, Milton Abbas, in a wooded valley (Luccombe Bottom) to the southeast of the Abbey. Most of the existing villagers were relocated here, and the previous village was demolished and the site landscaped.

The 36 almost identical thatched cottages were intended to house two families each. They were built from cob and previously were painted yellow, with each house fronted by a lawn; originally a horse chestnut tree was planted between each dwelling. Almshouses and a church were also provided for the new village, sited opposite each other. The almshouses were moved from the old town, where they had originally been built in 1674. The church, consecrated in 1786, is in Georgian Gothic style, with late 19th-century additions.

The word 'Abbas' used here as part of a place name (another example would be the English village of Compton Abbas) usually relates to land previously owned by an abbess (the head of an abbey of nuns).

Some house-names give clues to some of the original inhabitants of the village: baker, blacksmith, brewery, etc. Today the houses are white-washed, and the main street also features a public house (the Hambro Arms), a Post Office/shop, the Tea Clipper Tea Rooms, a now redundant school building, and a Wesleyan chapel. In 1953 the original horse chestnut trees were judged unsafe and a danger to the houses and removed. Above the eastern end of the valley, the village has been extended with more modern housing and other facilities, including a doctor's surgery.

== Geography ==
Measured directly, Milton Abbas village is about five miles (eight kilometres) southwest of the market town of Blandford Forum and 9 1/2 miles (15 kilometres) northeast of the county town of Dorchester. Milton Abbas civil parish extends from the village south to Bagber Farm, west to Bramblecombe Lane, north to Delcombe Head, and east to the top of Whatcombe Wood.

== Demography ==
In the 2011 census Milton Abbas civil parish had 263 dwellings, 232 households and a population of 755; 25% of the population lived in a communal establishment and 59% of the population was male, reflecting the effect of the boarding school on census figures for the parish.

Census population of Milton Abbas parish
Census	Population	Female	Male	Households	Source
1921	467				
1931	486				
1951	535				
1961	558				
1971	790				
1981	430				
1991	770				
2001	766	298	468	230	
2011	755	309	446	232	
2021	729	338	391	233	

== 18th-century street fair ==
Every two years there is a simulation of an 18th-century country fair with traditional music and dancing and local crafts people. Residents and stall holders dress in period costume.

== Notable buildings ==
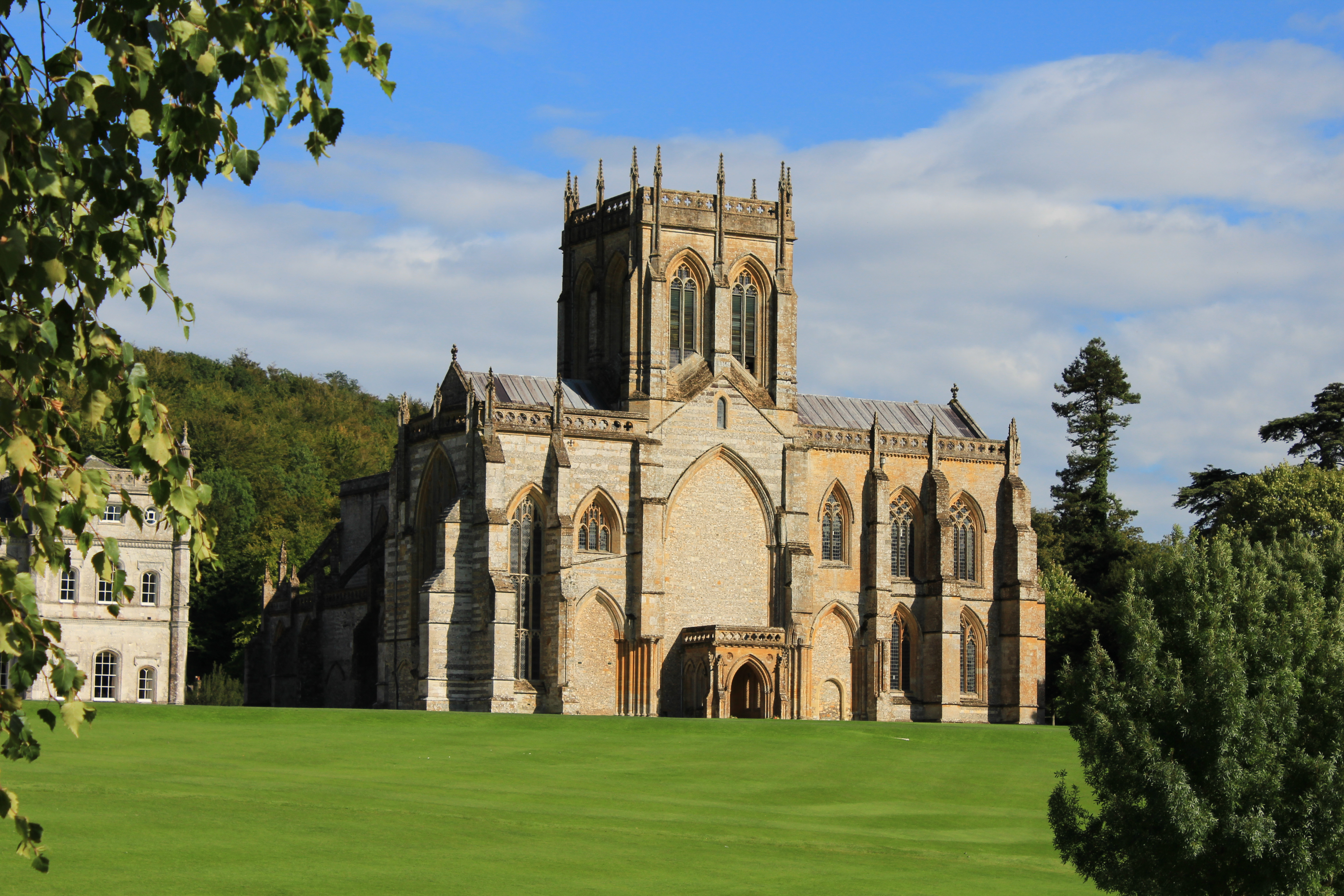
Abbey Church of St Mary, St Sansom and St Bradwalader

Within Milton Abbas civil parish, 75 structures are listed by Historic England for their historical or architectural interest; four structures are listed as Grade I, six are Grade II* and the rest are Grade II. The Grade I structures are the Abbey Church of St Mary, St Sansom and St Bradwalader, the Chapel of St Catherine, Milton Abbey School, and The Abbot's Hall and kitchen at Milton Abbey. The Grade II* structures are the almshouses and reading room, Delcombe Manor, Garden Cottage at Delcombe Manor, the Parish Church of St James (built circa 1786), The Old Rectory, and The Stone Lodge And Gatehouse (including the gatehouse, gatepiers and gates). In addition to the listed structures, 535 hectares (1,320 acres) of parkland around the abbey site are listed as Grade II* on the Register of Historic Parks and Gardens.

The Abbey Church dates mostly from the 14th century, with a 15th-century north transept and tower extension. It was restored in 1790 by James Wyatt and in 1865 by Sir George Gilbert Scott. It is described in its listing text as "a church of major importance". The Chapel of St Catherine dates from the late 12th century and originally served the abbey. It has been changed little since its construction; during the 18th century the chancel walls were raised and the nave's west wall rebuilt, in 1901 it was restored, and about 1980 the stone slates on the north side of the roof were replaced with artificial stone. Milton Abbey School, built in 1771–1776 as a country house, was designed by Sir William Chambers and James Wyatt in the early Gothic Revival style. It largely replaced the abbey's domestic buildings. The abbot's hall and kitchen at Milton Abbey used to be the abbey's hall (built 1498) and dining room (17th century); they were incorporated into the country house (now Milton Abbey School) by Chambers and restored by Sir Gilbert Scott in the mid-19th century. A fire in 1956 destroyed internal features in the kitchen.

Milton Manor, on the east side of the village, is listed as Grade II. It was originally built in the mid 19th century as a shooting lodge forming part of the Hambro Estate. It was enlarged in the early 20th century in the Arts and Crafts style.

== Education ==
The original abbey and House is now Milton Abbey School, a co-educational independent school, with around 250 pupils.
