= Joseph Damer, 1st Earl of Dorchester =

British politician, later peer

Joseph Damer, 1st Earl of Dorchester (12 March 1718 – 12 January 1798) was a country landowner and politician who sat in the House of Commons from 1741 to 1762 when he was raised to the peerage as Baron Milton. He was particularly associated with the reshaping of Milton Abbey and the creation of the village of Milton Abbas in Dorset, south-west England.

== Early life ==
Damer was the eldest son of Joseph Damer MP of Winterbourne Came, and his wife Mary Churchill, daughter of John Churchill of Henbury, Dorset. He was from a wealthy family and his great-uncle was a money-lender in Ireland. He was baptised at the Holy Trinity Church, Dorchester and educated at Trinity College, Dublin in 1734–5. He married Lady Caroline Sackville, daughter of the 1st Duke of Dorset on 27 July 1742.

== Political career ==
Damer was returned as Member of Parliament (MP) for Weymouth in the 1741 general election at the age of 22. He was then returned for Bramber in the 1747 general election and Dorchester in the 1754 general election. On 3 July 1753, Damer was created Baron Milton of Shrone Hill, County Tipperary, in the peerage of Ireland, which did not transfer him into the House of Lords, and then on 10 May 1762 Baron Milton of Milton Abbey in the peerage of Great Britain, which did.

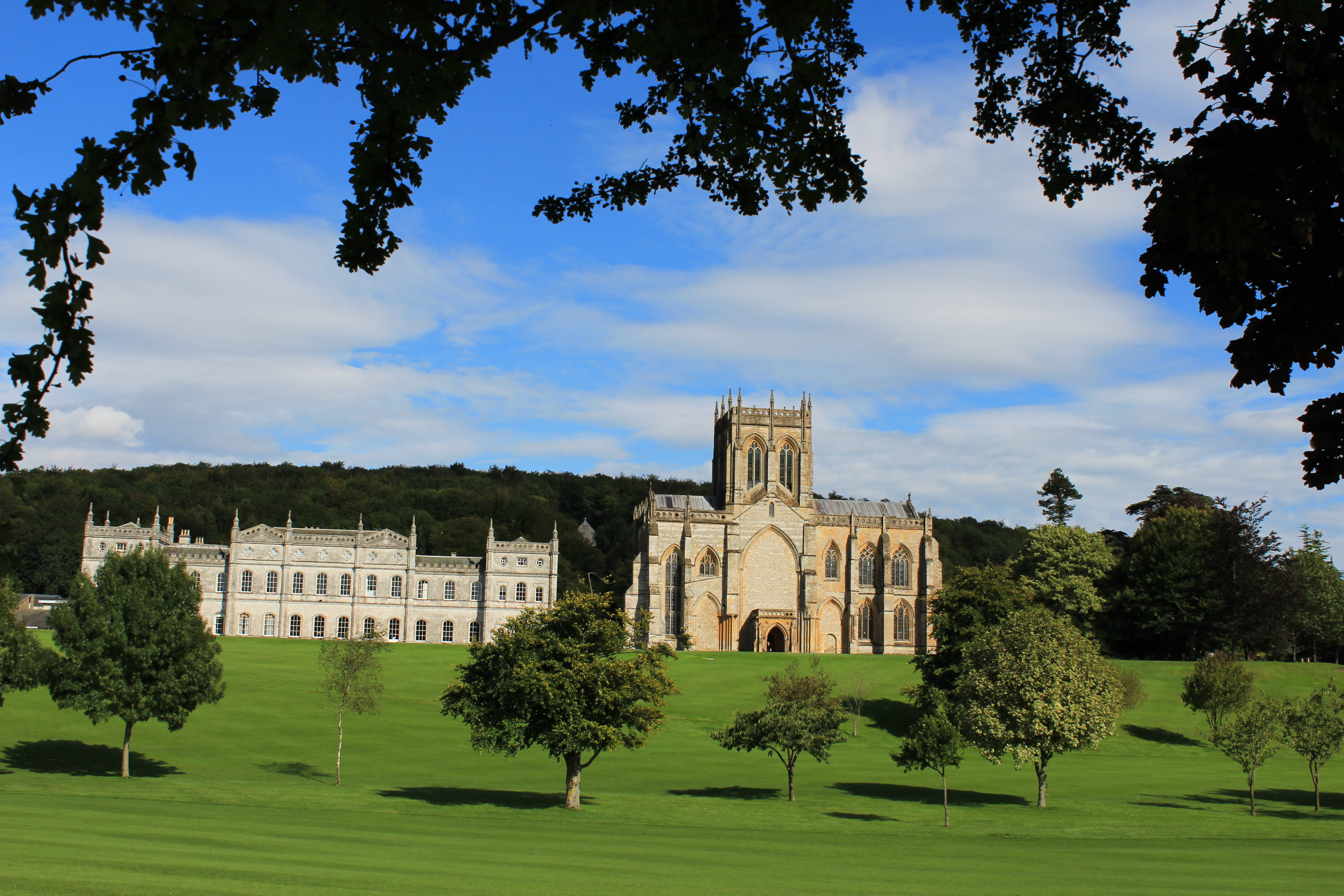
Milton Abbey

== Building ==
In 1751, Damer commissioned architect John Vardy to build him a London residence on Park Lane. He also purchased Milton Abbey and embarked on an ambitious project to reshape the surrounding valley. He replaced some existing buildings at the Abbey with a mansion house (designed initially by Vardy, then by Sir William Chambers, and completed by James Wyatt) for his own use. Landscape gardener Capability Brown was commissioned to remodel the surrounding grounds.

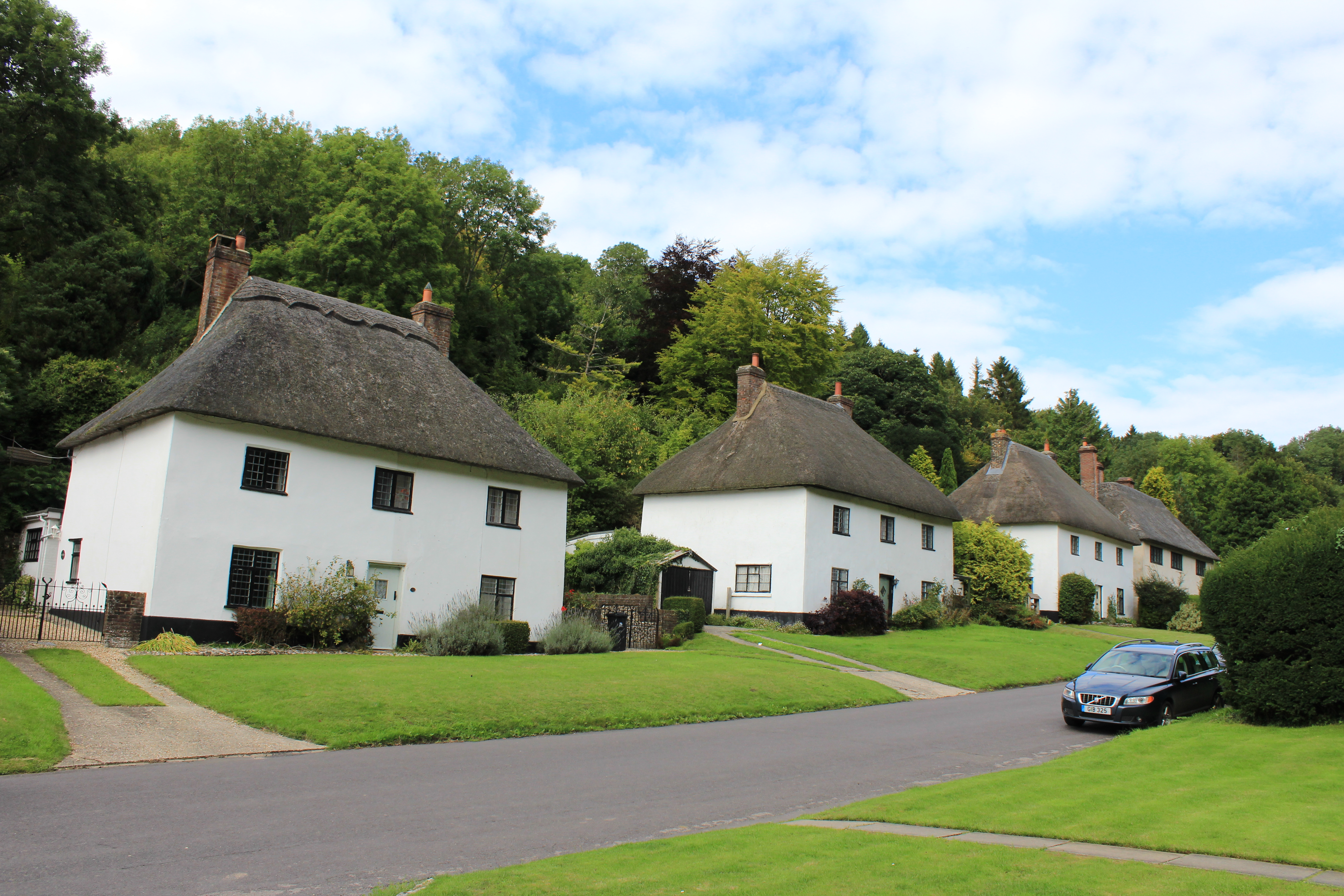
Milton Abbas main street

As a wealthy landowner Damer also set about the systematic removal of the neighbouring small town of Middleton and its residents. By 1780, most of the residents had been relocated to a new purpose-designed and built model village, Milton Abbas, approximately half a mile southeast of the Abbey; the town's grammar school was moved to Blandford Forum, 7 miles (11 km) away. The original town was razed to the ground and landscaped, most of the site disappearing beneath a new ornamental lake.

== Later life and legacy ==
Damer's wife Lady Caroline died on 24 March 1775 at the age of 57, and he commissioned the Italian sculptor Agostino Carlini to create a magnificent tomb to her memory in the Abbey Church at Milton Abbey. In politics he had been associated with his brother-in-law, Lord George Sackville, and from 1768 to 1775 with Rockingham, but upon his wife's death he spent a period in seclusion. In 1778 he returned to political life and took up a violent animosity against the Americans in their war of independence.

Damer was created first Earl of Dorchester and Viscount Milton on 18 May 1792. His income was variously estimated at between £15,000 and £30,000 a year. Horace Walpole in 1774 described him as "the most arrogant and proud of men", and Wraxall wrote of him: "At his seat of Milton Abbey in Dorsetshire, where he maintained a gloomy and sequestered splendour, analogous to his character and habits, he had made immense landed purchases, which, exhausting his pecuniary means, extensive as they were, reduced him to a species of temporary distress."

Damer died in 1798. He and his wife Caroline had three sons. The eldest, John, born in 1744, married the sculptor Anne Seymour Conway in 1767. She separated from him after seven years. Deep in debt, John Damer shot himself in 1776. The second son, George, born 1746, was also an MP and succeeded his father as Earl of Dorchester, but died unmarried in 1808, whereupon the title became extinct and the estate passed to his sister, Caroline.

Damer's Park Lane mansion became known as The Dorchester. It was replaced by an Italianate building during the mid-19th century, but the name lives on as it is now the site of the Dorchester Hotel.

== Notes ==
Parliament of Great Britain
Preceded by John Tucker; John Olmius; Thomas Pearse; George Dodington	Member of Parliament for Weymouth and Melcombe Regis; 1741–1747; With: John Tucker; John Raymond; James Steuart	Succeeded by Welbore Ellis; Richard Plumer; George Dodington; Edward Hungate Beaghan
Preceded by Henry Gough; Thomas Archer	Member of Parliament for Bramber; 1747–1751; With: Henry Gough; Henry Pelham	Succeeded by Viscount Malpas; Nathaniel Newnham
Preceded by John Pitt (of Encombe); George Clavell	Member of Parliament for Dorchester; 1754–1762; With: John Pitt (of Encombe) 1754–1761; Thomas Foster	Succeeded by Thomas Foster; John Damer
Peerage of Great Britain
New creation	Earl of Dorchester; 1792–1798	Succeeded by George Damer
New creation	Baron Milton; 1762–1798	Succeeded by George Damer
Peerage of Ireland
New creation	Baron Milton; 1753–1798	Succeeded by George Damer
