= Baron Whitworth =

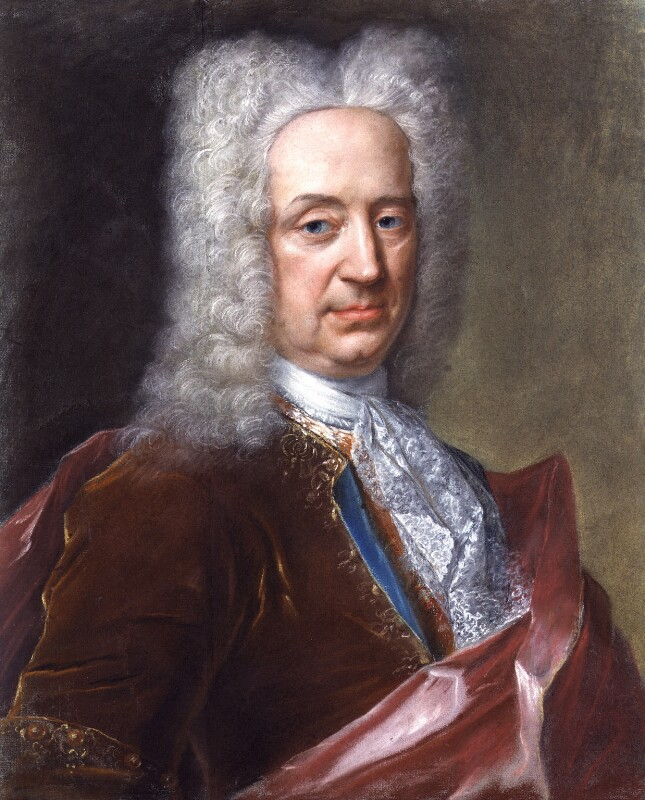
c. 1724 portrait of Charles Whitworth, 1st Baron Whitworth

Baron Whitworth was a title that was created twice in the Peerage of Ireland. The first creation came in 1721 when Charles Whitworth was made Baron Whitworth, of Galway. He was childless and the title became extinct on his death in 1725. The second creation came in 1800 when Sir Charles Whitworth was made Baron Whitworth, of Newport Pratt in the County of Mayo. He was the son of Sir Charles Whitworth, nephew and namesake of the first Baron of the 1721 creation. For more information on the second creation, see Charles Whitworth, 1st Earl Whitworth.

== Barons Whitworth; First creation (1721) ==
- Charles Whitworth, 1st Baron Whitworth (1675–1725)

== Barons Whitworth; Second creation (1800) ==
- see Charles Whitworth, 1st Earl Whitworth
