= Earl Nugent =

Extinct title in the Peerage of Ireland

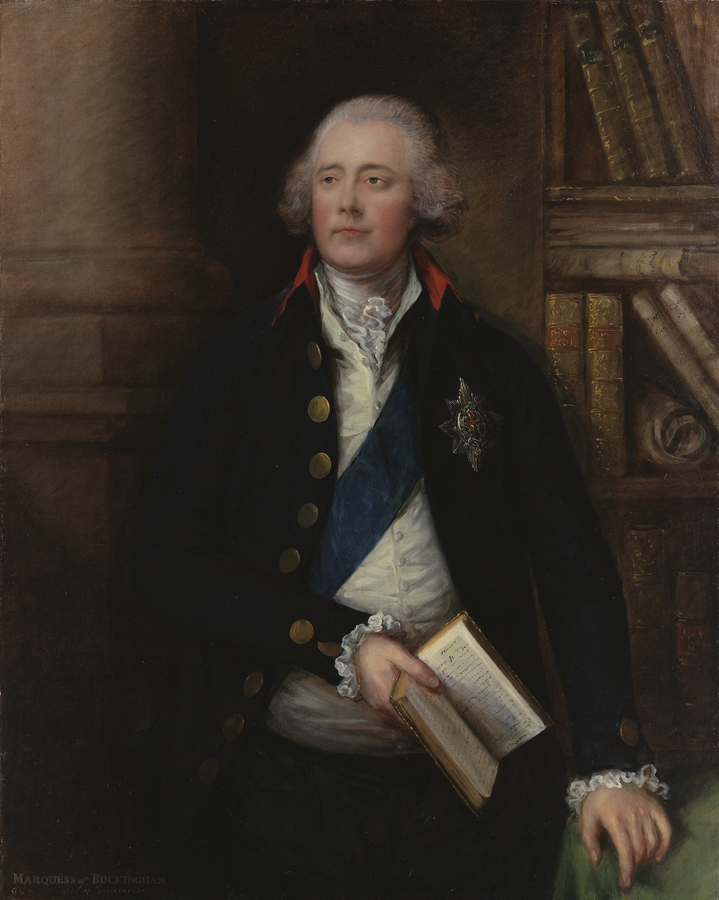

Earl Nugent was a title the Peerage of Ireland. It was created on 21 July 1776 for Robert Craggs-Nugent, 1st Viscount Clare, with remainder, failing heirs male of his body, to his son-in-law the 3rd Earl Temple and the heirs male of his body. Craggs-Nugent had already been made Baron Nugent, of Carlanstown in the County of Westmeath, and Viscount Clare, in the Peerage of Ireland on 19 January 1767. He died 13 October 1788, when the barony and viscountcy became extinct, and the earldom, under the terms of the special remainder, passed to his son-in-law, formerly known as Lord Temple, now the 1st Marquess of Buckingham. The earldom remained in his family until the death of the 5th Earl Nugent, also the 3rd Duke of Buckingham and Chandos, on 26 March 1889. See Viscount Cobham for further history of the title. The barony of Nugent was revived in 1800 in favour of his daughter, Mary, Marchioness of Buckingham. See Baron Nugent.

== Earl Nugent (1776) ==
- Robert Craggs-Nugent, 1st Earl Nugent (1702–1788)
- George Nugent-Temple-Grenville, 1st Marquess of Buckingham, 2nd Earl Nugent (1753–1813)
- Richard Temple-Nugent-Brydges-Chandos-Grenville, 2nd Marquess of Buckingham, 3rd Earl Nugent (1776–1839 (created Duke of Buckingham and Chandos in 1822)
- Richard Plantagenet Temple-Nugent-Brydges-Chandos-Grenville, 2nd Duke of Buckingham and Chandos, 4th Earl Nugent (1797–1861)
- Richard Plantagenet Campbell Temple-Nugent-Brydges-Chandos-Grenville, 3rd Duke of Buckingham and Chandos, 5th Earl Nugent (1823–1889)

== See also ==
- Viscount Cobham
- Baron Nugent
- Viscount Clare
