= Milton Abbey School =

Private school in Dorset, England

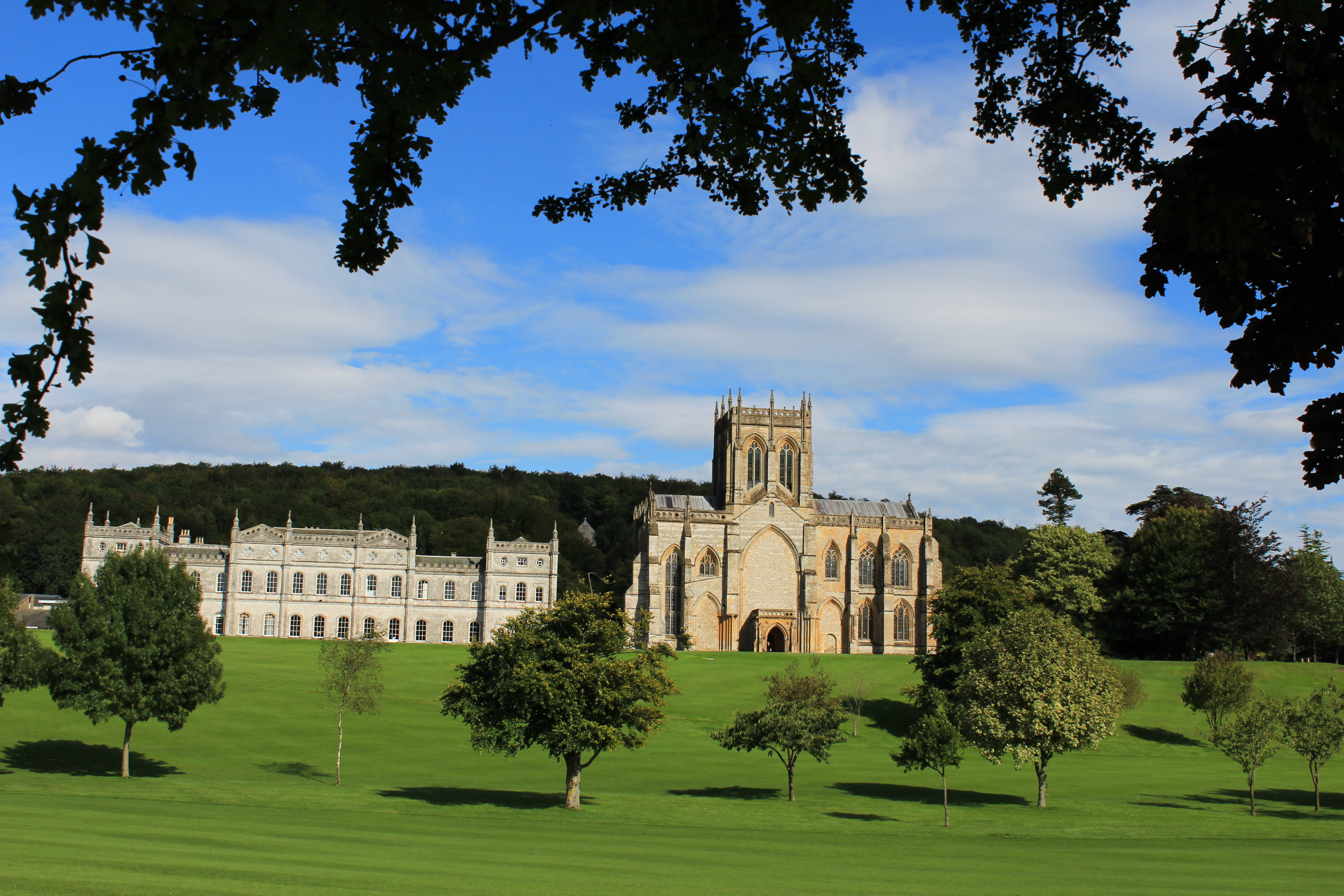

Location
- Milton Abbas near Blandford Forum, Dorset, DT11 0BZ; England; 50°49′12.74″N 2°17′14.75″W

Information
- Type: Private; Day and boarding school
- Religious affiliation: Church of England
- Established: 1954; 72 years ago
- Department for Education URN: 113932 Tables
- Chair of Governors: Ian G Bromilow
- Head: James Watson
- Staff: 129 (including part-time and contracts)
- Gender: Co-educational
- Age: 13 to 18
- Enrollment: 224 pupils as of September 2023
- Houses: Athelstan, Damer, Hambro, Huighe's and Tregonwell
- Alumni: Milton Abbey Association
- Website: www.miltonabbey.co.uk

Milton Abbey School is a private school for day and boarding pupils in the village of Milton Abbas, near Blandford Forum in Dorset, in South West England. It has 224 pupils as of September 2023, in five houses: Athelstan, Damer, Hambro, Huighe's and Tregonwell. The school was founded as a boys' school in 1954 and is now co-educational.

The school has facilities that include a golf course, a 15th-century dining hall, an Abbey chapel that can be traced back to the 10th century and grounds designed by Lancelot "Capability" Brown. The main house was built by Joseph Damer, 1st Earl of Dorchester.

== Academics ==
Milton Abbey School offers the English curriculum of GCSEs, A-levels, and BTECs. The school was named BTEC School of the Year 2019 by BTEC awarding body Pearson.

== Abbey Church ==
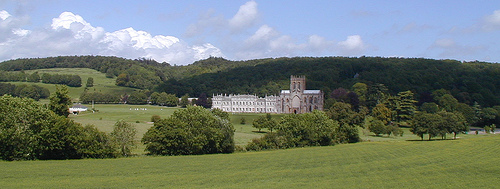
Milton Abbey School

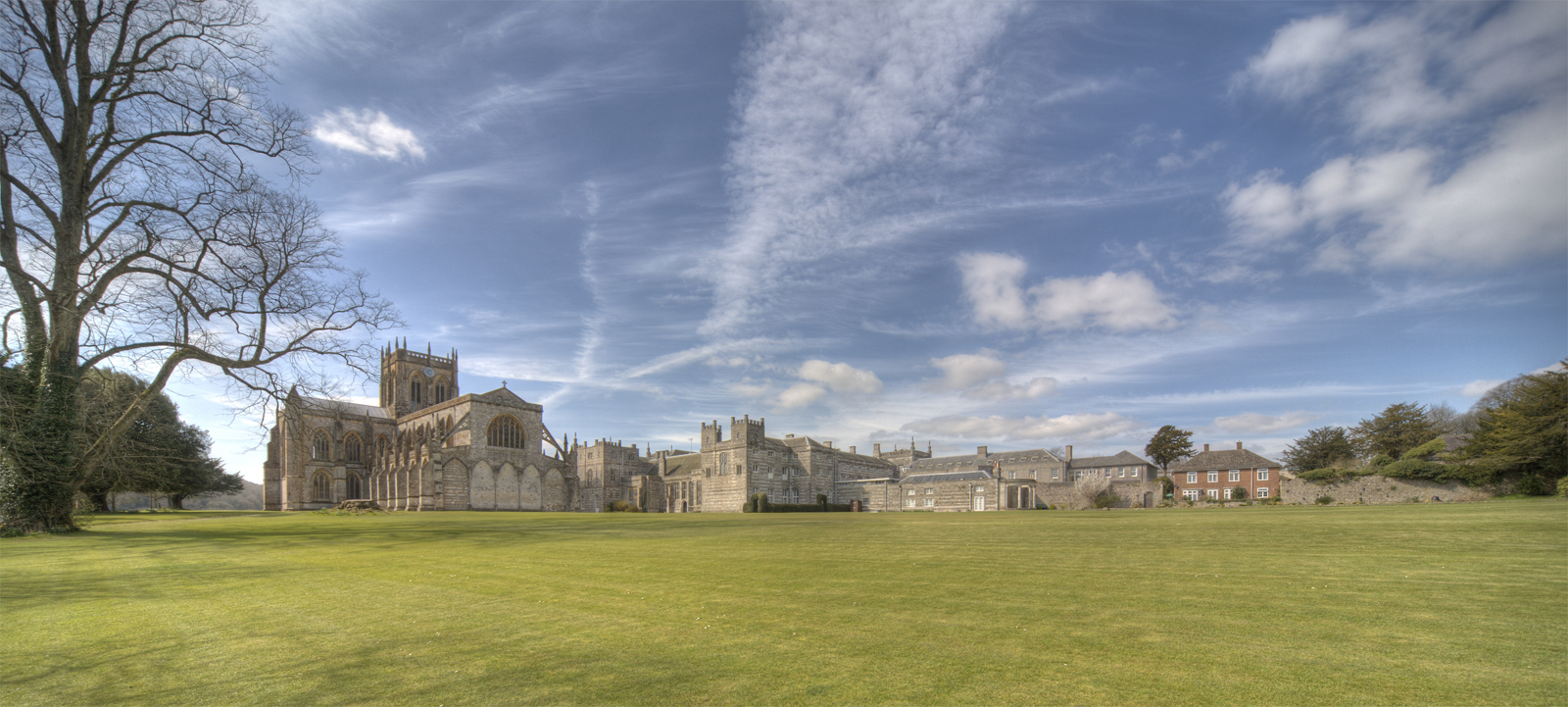
Milton Abbey Chapel and main building

A chapel service takes place for the whole school twice a week. On Monday there is a house assembly and Wednesday a whole school assembly. On Sundays the school gathers for a formal Sunday worship, and there are regular communion services throughout the term. The school, although a Church of England foundation, welcomes people of any faith, and also of none.

The abbey church is built in a mixture of Ham stone, Chilmark stone and flint and consists only of the choir, central tower and transepts. Its style is mostly decorated gothic dating from the mid-14th century with some 15th-century details in the tower and north transept. The eastern Lady Chapel was demolished after the suppression and some alterations were made by Wyatt in the late 18th century. The Earl and Countess of Dorchester were also generous to the church, and their joint tomb, designed by Robert Adam with sculpture by Agostino Carlini, is to be found in the north transept. Perhaps the most striking feature of the church's interior, however, is its south window, designed as a Tree of Jesse by Augustus Pugin. Other features of interest are the 14th-century pulpitum and sedilia, the 15th-century reredos and pyx canopy, and the 16th-century monument to John Tregonwell.

== History ==
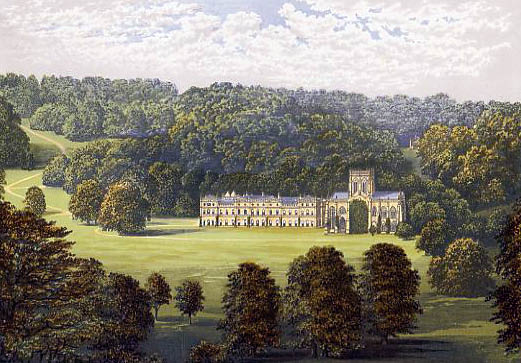
Milton Abbey in the late 19th century

Milton Abbey (fully, the Abbey Church of St Mary, St Samson, and St Branwalader) in Dorset was a Benedictine foundation, but only part of the church now survives and is used as the Milton Abbey School chapel. A college of secular canons was founded here by King Athelstan, in 933, and there are two medieval paintings of the king and his mother in the chancel. This foundation was replaced in 964 by a Benedictine monastery by King Edgar. The medieval church burned down in 1309, and although rebuilding started straight away it did not reach its present size until about 1400.

One of the church's benefactors was Sir John Tregonwell, whose family came into the possession of the buildings in 1540 following the Dissolution of the Monasteries in 1539. Tregonwell fell from the roof of the church in a childhood accident, but his life was saved when his wide pantaloons filled with air and broke his fall. In thanks, he bequeathed his library to the church. Sir John also was buried in an altar tomb in the Abbey Church.

In 1752, the buildings were bought by the Damer family: in 1771, to make way for a new house and landscaped estate, the 1st Baron Milton (later 1st Earl of Dorchester) demolished the remaining abbey buildings, keeping only part of the church as a private chapel, and the adjacent market town of Milton (creating Milton Abbas to rehouse the former inhabitants) in 1780. The new house was designed by William Chambers and the gardens by Capability Brown. Several members of the Damer family were buried in the family vault in the Abbey Church.

In 1852, the merchant banker Carl Joachim Hambro acquired Milton Abbey to make it his family home. He set about a major restoration programme, including an extensive refurbishment of the Abbey itself. The Hambro family developed and lived at Milton Abbey until 1932, when it was sold and for a while they moved to Hedge End Farm nearby, followed by a permanent move to Dixton Manor in Gloucestershire.

Milton Abbey School was the setting for "Bamfylde School" in the 1980 13-part TV series of R. F. Delderfield's To Serve Them All My Days. It also featured in the first of the Ripping Yarns by Michael Palin and Terry Jones, titled Tomkinson's Schooldays and in the 1994 film version of The Browning Version with Albert Finney and Greta Scacchi.

=== Burials ===
- Joseph Damer, 1st Earl of Dorchester
- John Tregonwell
- John Damer
- Carl Joachim Hambro (banker)
- Angus Hambro

=== Grounds ===
The parklands were landscaped in the late 18th century by Capability Brown. They are Grade II* listed in the National Register of Historic Parks and Gardens.

In 2009, the school started to develop a farm, which is worked on by staff, to promote environmental awareness and work towards an element of self-sufficiency. Traditional vegetables are grown, in addition to herbs, cutting flowers, fruit and some crops. The estate also has a small number of pigs, sheep, chickens and ducks.

The school has a golf course which winds around the main house and the Abbey Church. Designed by Peter Alliss and opened in 1972, it is a nine-hole course with par-3 and par-4 hours, which is used by pupils and by visitors, who are required to pay a small green fee. The school employs a PGA Professional, who helps to tutor the students.

== List of headteachers ==
- 1954–55: Revd. C. K. Francis Brown – founding Headmaster
- 1955–69: Cdr. R. H. Hodgkinson – previously an Officer in the Royal Navy; retired 1969.
- 1969–79: W. M. T. Holland – previously a housemaster at Eastbourne College; left to enter the priesthood.
- 1979–87: S. R. D. Hall – previously housemaster at Haileybury, and subsequently appointed as Warden of Glenalmond.
- 1987–95: R. H. Hardy – previously housemaster at Eton College; retired 1995.
- 1995–2010: W. J. Hughes-D'Aeth – previously a housemaster at Rugby School, and subsequently appointed to the post of Headmaster of Repton School, Dubai.
- 2010–14: G. E. Doodes – previously Deputy Headmaster at Milton Abbey and subsequently Principal of George Heriot's School, Edinburgh.
- 2014–18: Magnus Bashaarat – previously Deputy Head of Stowe.
- 2018–2023: Judith Fremont-Barnes – previously Head at Duke of Kent School in Surrey.
- 2023–current: James Watson – previously Senior Deputy Headmaster at Milton Abbey and Second Master of Bruern Abbey.

== Notable former pupils ==
See also Category:People educated at Milton Abbey School

- Alastair Bruce, governor of Edinburgh Castle, major general, professor, royalist, and events commentator
- Rupert Evans, stage, film and television actor
- Alexander Faludy, former child prodigy and youngest University of Cambridge undergraduate since 1773
- Jonathan Freeman-Attwood, principal of the Royal Academy of Music
- Francis Fulford, landowner and television personality
- Edward Hay, 13th Marquess of Tweeddale
- Tom Homer, rugby union player
- Rupert Mitford, 6th Baron Redesdale
- Charles Montagu, 5th Baron Swaythling
- John Nash, Baron Nash, Parliamentary Under Secretary of State for Schools and co-founder of the charity Future
- Josh Ovens, rugby union player
- Prince Rostislav Romanov, landscape painter
- Eric Saumarez, 7th Baron de Saumarez
- Mark Shand, travel writer, conservationist and brother to Queen Camilla
- Cenzo Townshend, record producer
