= Baron Aghrim =

Baron of Aghrim was a title created twice in the Peerage of Ireland, both times as a subsidiary title. The first creation was on 13 April 1676 for Lord John Butler, who was created Earl of Gowran at the same time. Both titles became extinct a year later. The second creation was on 4 March 1692 for Godert de Ginkell, who was also created Earl of Athlone. This creation of the title (along with the Earldom of Athlone), became extinct in 1844.

== Barons Aghrim; First creation (1676) ==
- see Earl of Gowran

== Barons Aghrim; Second creation (1692) ==
- See Earl of Athlone
