= Earl of Dorchester =

Earldom in the Peerage of Great Britain

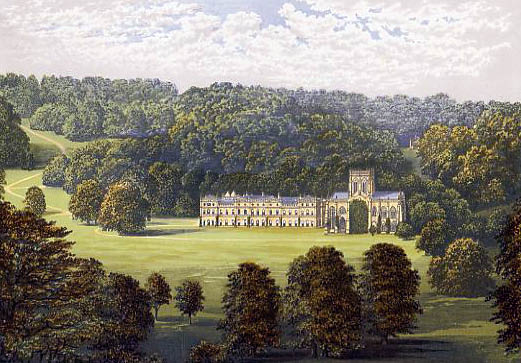
Milton Abbey in the late 19th century

Earl of Dorchester, in the County of Dorset, was a title in the Peerage of Great Britain. It was created in 1792 for Joseph Damer, 1st Baron Milton. He was a politician but is best remembered for the reshaping of Milton Abbey and the creation of the village of Milton Abbas in Dorset. Damer had already been created Baron Milton, of Shronehill in the County of Tipperary, in the Peerage of Ireland, in 1753 and Baron Milton, of Milton Abbey in the County of Dorset, in the Peerage of Great Britain, in 1762. In 1792 he was made Viscount Milton, of Milton Abbey in the County of Dorset, at the same time he was given the earldom. He was succeeded by his elder son. The second earl was a politician and notably served as Chief Secretary for Ireland between 1794 and 1795. He was unmarried and the titles became extinct on his death in 1808.

The title Countess of Dorchester had previously been created in the Peerage of England in 1686, together with the title Baroness Darlington, as life peerages, for Catherine Sedley, a mistress of King James II. Both titles became extinct on her death in 1717, but her heirs were Earls of Portmore in the Peerage of Scotland.

== Countess of Dorchester (1686) ==
- Catherine Sedley, Countess of Dorchester (1657–1717)

== Earls of Dorchester (1792) ==
- Joseph Damer, 1st Earl of Dorchester (1718–1798)
- George Damer, 2nd Earl of Dorchester (1746–1808)

== See also ==
- Marquess of Dorchester
- Baron Dorchester
