= List of life peerages (2010–2024) =

Peerages and baronetcies of Britain and Ireland
Extant	All
Dukes	Dukedoms
Marquesses	Marquessates
Earls	Earldoms
Viscounts	Viscountcies
Barons	Baronies
En, Sc, GB, Ire, UK (law, life: 1958–1979, 1979–1997, 1997–2010, 2010–2024, 2024–present)
Baronets	Baronetcies

This is a list of life peerages in the Peerage of the United Kingdom created under the Life Peerages Act 1958 from 2010 to 2024, during the tenures of Conservative prime ministers David Cameron, Theresa May, Boris Johnson, Liz Truss and Rishi Sunak.

Queen Elizabeth II died on 8 September 2022, two days after appointing Truss. All subsequent peerages were created by King Charles III.

== David Cameron (2010–2016) ==
Living
Living but left the House of Lords

Number	Date of creation	Name	Title	Territorial qualification	Party affiliation when taking seat	Date of retirement (if applicable)	Date of extinction (if applicable)
1	27 May 2010	Jonathan Hill	Baron Hill of Oareford	of Oareford in the County of Somerset	Conservative		
2	28 May 2010	Nat Wei	Baron Wei	of Shoreditch in the London Borough of Hackney	Conservative		
3	29 May 2010	James Sassoon	Baron Sassoon	of Ashley Park in the County of Surrey	Conservative		
4	17 June 2010 (a.m.)	Maeve Sherlock	Baroness Sherlock	of Durham in the County of Durham	Labour		
5	17 June 2010 (p.m.)	John McFall ‡	Baron McFall of Alcluith	of Dumbarton in Dunbartonshire	Labour		
6	18 June 2010 (6 a.m.)	Simon Wolfson	Baron Wolfson of Aspley Guise	of Aspley Guise in the County of Bedfordshire	Conservative		
7	18 June 2010 (9 a.m.)	Phil Willis ‡	Baron Willis of Knaresborough	of Harrogate in the County of North Yorkshire	Liberal Democrat		
8	18 June 2010 (12 noon)	Hilary Armstrong ‡	Baroness Armstrong of Hill Top	of Crook in the County of Durham	Labour		
9	18 June 2010 (3 p.m.)	Ian Paisley ‡ #	Baron Bannside	of North Antrim in the County of Antrim	Democratic Unionist		12 September 2014
10	19 June 2010	Roger Liddle	Baron Liddle	of Carlisle in the County of Cumbria	Labour		
11	20 June 2010 (a.m.)	Jeannie Drake	Baroness Drake	of Shene in the County of Surrey	Labour		
12	20 June 2010 (p.m.)	Margaret Wheeler	Baroness Wheeler	of Blackfriars in the City of London	Labour		
13	21 June 2010 (a.m.)	John Gummer ‡	Baron Deben	of Winston in the County of Suffolk	Conservative		
14	21 June 2010 (p.m.)	Roy Kennedy	Baron Kennedy of Southwark	of Newington in the London Borough of Southwark	Labour		
15	22 June 2010 (a.m.)	Dianne Hayter	Baroness Hayter of Kentish Town	of Kentish Town in the London Borough of Camden	Labour		
16	22 June 2010 (p.m.)	Tommy McAvoy ‡	Baron McAvoy	of Rutherglen in Lanarkshire	Labour		8 March 2024
17	23 June 2010 (a.m.)	Jim Knight ‡	Baron Knight of Weymouth	of Weymouth in the County of Dorset	Labour		
18	23 June 2010 (p.m.)	John Gardiner	Baron Gardiner of Kimble	of Kimble in the County of Buckinghamshire	Conservative		
19	24 June 2010 (a.m.)	John Maples ‡	Baron Maples	of Stratford-upon-Avon in the County of Warwickshire	Conservative		9 June 2012
20	24 June 2010 (p.m.)	Mike German	Baron German	of Llanfrechfa in the County Borough of Torfaen	Liberal Democrat		
21	25 June 2010 (a.m.)	Meral Hussein-Ece	Baroness Hussein-Ece	of Highbury in the London Borough of Islington	Liberal Democrat		
22	25 June 2010 (p.m.)	Shireen Ritchie	Baroness Ritchie of Brompton	of Brompton in the Royal Borough of Kensington and Chelsea	Conservative		24 April 2012
23	26 June 2010 (a.m.)	Floella Benjamin	Baroness Benjamin	of Beckenham in the County of Kent	Liberal Democrat		
24	26 June 2010 (p.m.)	Rita Donaghy	Baroness Donaghy	of Peckham in the London Borough of Southwark	Labour		
25	27 June 2010 (a.m.)	John Hutton ‡	Baron Hutton of Furness	of Aldingham in the County of Cumbria	Labour		
26	27 June 2010 (p.m.)	Paul Boateng ‡	Baron Boateng	of Akyem in the Republic of Ghana and of Wembley in the London Borough of Brent	Labour		
27	28 June 2010 (6 a.m.)	Jack McConnell	Baron McConnell of Glenscorrodale	of the Isle of Arran in Ayrshire and Arran	Labour		
28	28 June 2010 (9 a.m.)	Don Touhig ‡	Baron Touhig	of Islwyn and Glansychan in the County of Gwent	Labour		
29	7 July 2010 (a.m.)	Quentin Davies ‡	Baron Davies of Stamford	of Stamford in the County of Lincolnshire	Labour	25 July 2023	13 January 2025
30	7 July 2010 (1 p.m.)	Angela Smith ‡	Baroness Smith of Basildon	of Basildon in the County of Essex	Labour		
31	7 July 2010 (2 p.m.)	John Prescott ‡ #	Baron Prescott	of Kingston upon Hull in the County of East Yorkshire	Labour	9 July 2024	20 November 2024
32	7 July 2010 (3 p.m.)	Helen Liddell ‡	Baroness Liddell of Coatdyke	of Airdrie in Lanarkshire	Labour		
33	8 July 2010 (a.m.)	Michael Spicer ‡	Baron Spicer	of Cropthorne in the County of Worcestershire	Conservative		29 May 2019
34	8 July 2010 (p.m.)	Tim Boswell ‡	Baron Boswell of Aynho	of Aynho in the County of Northamptonshire	Conservative	24 July 2025	30 August 2025
35	9 July 2010 (a.m.)	Guy Black	Baron Black of Brentwood	of Brentwood in the County of Essex	Conservative		
36	9 July 2010 (p.m.)	Angela Browning ‡	Baroness Browning	of Whimple in the County of Devon	Conservative		
37	10 July 2010 (a.m.)	Michael Wills ‡	Baron Wills	of North Swindon in the County of Wiltshire and of Woodside Park in the London Borough of Barnet	Labour		
38	10 July 2010 (p.m.)	Dolar Popat	Baron Popat	of Harrow in the London Borough of Harrow	Conservative		
39	12 July 2010 (a.m.)	Deborah Stedman-Scott	Baroness Stedman-Scott	of Rolvenden in the County of Kent	Conservative		
40	12 July 2010 (p.m.)	Ken Macdonald	Baron Macdonald of River Glaven	of Cley-next-the-Sea in the County of Norfolk	Liberal Democrat		
41	13 July 2010 (a.m.)	Wilf Stevenson	Baron Stevenson of Balmacara	of Little Missenden in the County of Buckinghamshire	Labour		
42	13 July 2010 (p.m.)	Michael Howard ‡	Baron Howard of Lympne	of Lympne in the County of Kent	Conservative		
43	14 July 2010 (a.m.)	John Shipley	Baron Shipley	of Gosforth in the County of Tyne and Wear	Liberal Democrat		
44	14 July 2010 (p.m.)	Helen Newlove	Baroness Newlove	of Warrington in the County of Cheshire	Conservative		11 November 2025
45	15 July 2010 (a.m.)	Kate Parminter	Baroness Parminter	of Godalming in the County of Surrey	Liberal Democrat		
46	15 July 2010 (p.m.)	Beverley Hughes ‡	Baroness Hughes of Stretford	of Ellesmere Port in the County of Cheshire	Labour		
47	16 July 2010 (a.m.)	Matthew Taylor ‡	Baron Taylor of Goss Moor	of Truro in the County of Cornwall	Liberal Democrat		
48	16 July 2010 (p.m.)	John Reid ‡	Baron Reid of Cardowan	of Stepps in Lanarkshire	Labour		
49	19 July 2010 (a.m.)	Susan Nye	Baroness Nye	of Lambeth in the London Borough of Lambeth	Labour		
50	19 July 2010 (p.m.)	Anna Healy	Baroness Healy of Primrose Hill	of Primrose Hill in the London Borough of Camden	Labour		
51	20 July 2010 (a.m.)	Ian Blair	Baron Blair of Boughton	of Boughton in the County of Cheshire	Crossbencher		9 July 2025
52	20 July 2010 (p.m.)	Jeremy Beecham	Baron Beecham	of Benwell and Newcastle upon Tyne in the County of Tyne and Wear	Labour	1 September 2021	9 April 2026
53	21 July 2010 (a.m.)	Edward Faulks	Baron Faulks	of Donnington in the Royal County of Berkshire	Conservative		
54	21 July 2010 (p.m.)	Margaret Eaton	Baroness Eaton	of Cottingley in the County of West Yorkshire	Conservative		
55	22 July 2010 (a.m.)	Richard Allan ‡	Baron Allan of Hallam	of Ecclesall in the County of South Yorkshire	Liberal Democrat		
56	22 July 2010 (p.m.)	Des Browne ‡	Baron Browne of Ladyton	of Ladyton in Ayrshire and Arran	Labour	23 February 2026	
57	23 July 2010	Michael Williams	Baron Williams of Baglan	of Neath Port Talbot in Glamorgan	Labour		23 April 2017
58	26 July 2010	John Monks	Baron Monks	of Blackley in the County of Greater Manchester	Labour		
59	8 November 2010	Peter Hennessy †	Baron Hennessy of Nympsfield	of Nympsfield in the County of Gloucestershire	Crossbencher	25 June 2026	
60	15 November 2010	Sheila Hollins †	Baroness Hollins	of Wimbledon in the London Borough of Merton and of Grenoside in the County of South Yorkshire	Crossbencher		
61	16 November 2010	Stephen Green	Baron Green of Hurstpierpoint	of Hurstpierpoint in the County of West Sussex	Conservative		
62	22 November 2010	Michael Kerr, 13th Marquess of Lothian ‡	Baron Kerr of Monteviot	of Monteviot in Roxburghshire	Conservative		1 October 2024
63	17 December 2010 (a.m.)	Robert Balchin	Baron Lingfield	of Lingfield in the County of Surrey	Conservative		
64	17 December 2010 (p.m.)	Andrew Feldman	Baron Feldman of Elstree	of Elstree in the County of Hertfordshire	Conservative		
65	18 December 2010 (a.m.)	Michael Dobbs	Baron Dobbs	of Wylye in the County of Wiltshire	Conservative		
66	18 December 2010 (p.m.)	Patrick Cormack ‡	Baron Cormack	of Enville in the County of Staffordshire	Conservative		25 February 2024
67	20 December 2010 (a.m.)	John Sharkey	Baron Sharkey	of Niton Undercliff in the County of the Isle of Wight	Liberal Democrat		
68	20 December 2010 (p.m.)	Bernard Ribeiro	Baron Ribeiro	of Achimota in the Republic of Ghana and of Ovington in the County of Hampshire	Conservative	23 October 2023	
69	21 December 2010 (a.m.)	Fiona Shackleton	Baroness Shackleton of Belgravia	of Belgravia in the City of Westminster	Conservative		
70	21 December 2010 (p.m.)	Dee Doocey	Baroness Doocey	of Hampton in the London Borough of Richmond upon Thames	Liberal Democrat		
71	22 December 2010 (a.m.)	Susan Kramer ‡	Baroness Kramer	of Richmond Park in the London Borough of Richmond upon Thames	Liberal Democrat		
72	22 December 2010 (p.m.)	Patience Wheatcroft	Baroness Wheatcroft	of Blackheath in the London Borough of Greenwich	Conservative		
73	23 December 2010 (a.m.)	Nicholas True	Baron True	of East Sheen in the County of Surrey	Conservative		
74	23 December 2010 (p.m.)	Alistair Cooke	Baron Lexden	of Lexden in the County of Essex and of Strangford in the County of Down	Conservative		
75	24 December 2010 (a.m.)	Judith Jolly	Baroness Jolly	of Congdon's Shop in the County of Cornwall	Liberal Democrat	31 July 2024	
76	24 December 2010 (p.m.)	Richard Spring ‡	Baron Risby	of Haverhill in the County of Suffolk	Conservative		
77	10 January 2011 (a.m.)	Tina Stowell	Baroness Stowell of Beeston	of Beeston in the County of Nottinghamshire	Conservative		
78	10 January 2011 (p.m.)	Paul Strasburger	Baron Strasburger	of Langridge in the County of Somerset	Liberal Democrat		
79	11 January 2011 (a.m.)	Jonathan Marks	Baron Marks of Henley-on-Thames	of Henley-on-Thames in the County of Oxfordshire	Liberal Democrat		
80	11 January 2011 (p.m.)	Gordon Wasserman	Baron Wasserman	of Pimlico in the City of Westminster	Conservative		
81	12 January 2011 (a.m.)	Julian Fellowes	Baron Fellowes of West Stafford	of West Stafford in the County of Dorset	Conservative	28 April 2026	
82	12 January 2011 (p.m.)	Raj Loomba	Baron Loomba	of Moor Park in the County of Hertfordshire	Liberal Democrat		
83	13 January 2011 (a.m.)	Tariq Ahmad	Baron Ahmad of Wimbledon	of Wimbledon in the London Borough of Merton	Conservative		
84	13 January 2011 (p.m.)	Howard Flight ‡	Baron Flight	of Worcester in the County of Worcestershire	Conservative		24 January 2026
85	14 January 2011 (a.m.)	Robert Edmiston	Baron Edmiston	of Lapworth in the County of Warwickshire	Conservative	22 July 2015	
86	14 January 2011 (p.m.)	Michael Lord ‡	Baron Framlingham	of Eye in the County of Suffolk	Conservative		
87	15 January 2011 (a.m.)	Stewart Wood	Baron Wood of Anfield	of Tonbridge in the County of Kent	Labour		
88	15 January 2011 (p.m.)	Reg Empey	Baron Empey	of Shandon in the City and County Borough of Belfast	Conservative		
89	17 January 2011 (a.m.)	Monroe Palmer	Baron Palmer of Childs Hill	of Childs Hill in the London Borough of Barnet	Liberal Democrat		
90	17 January 2011 (p.m.)	Ben Stoneham	Baron Stoneham of Droxford	of the Meon Valley in the County of Hampshire	Liberal Democrat		
91	18 January 2011 (a.m.)	Elizabeth Berridge	Baroness Berridge	of the Vale of Catmose in the County of Rutland	Conservative		
92	18 January 2011 (p.m.)	Stanley Fink	Baron Fink	of Northwood in the County of Middlesex	Conservative		
93	19 January 2011 (a.m.)	Richard Dannatt	Baron Dannatt	of Keswick in the County of Norfolk	Crossbencher		
94	19 January 2011 (p.m.)	Dafydd Wigley ‡	Baron Wigley	of Caernarfon in the County of Gwynedd	Plaid Cymru		
95	20 January 2011 (a.m.)	Ray Collins	Baron Collins of Highbury	of Highbury in the London Borough of Islington	Labour		
96	20 January 2011 (p.m.)	Qurban Hussain	Baron Hussain	of Luton in the County of Bedfordshire	Liberal Democrat		
97	21 January 2011 (a.m.)	Joan Bakewell	Baroness Bakewell	of Stockport in the County of Greater Manchester	Labour		
98	21 January 2011 (p.m.)	Rachael Heyhoe Flint	Baroness Heyhoe Flint	of Wolverhampton in the County of West Midlands	Conservative		18 January 2017
99	24 January 2011 (a.m.)	Jonathan Kestenbaum	Baron Kestenbaum	of Foxcote in the County of Somerset	Labour		
100	24 January 2011 (p.m.)	Eluned Morgan #	Baroness Morgan of Ely	of Ely in the City of Cardiff	Labour		
101	25 January 2011 (a.m.)	George Magan	Baron Magan of Castletown	of Kensington in the Royal Borough of Kensington and Chelsea	Conservative		
102	25 January 2011 (p.m.)	Michael Grade	Baron Grade of Yarmouth	of Yarmouth in the County of Isle of Wight	Conservative		
103	26 January 2011 (a.m.)	Anne Jenkin	Baroness Jenkin of Kennington	of Hatfield Peverel in the County of Essex	Conservative		
104	26 January 2011 (p.m.)	Oona King ‡	Baroness King of Bow	of Bow in the London Borough of Tower Hamlets	Labour	9 July 2024	
105	27 January 2011 (a.m.)	Jenny Randerson	Baroness Randerson	of Roath Park in the City of Cardiff	Liberal Democrat		4 January 2025
106	27 January 2011 (p.m.)	Gulam Noon	Baron Noon	of St John's Wood in the London Borough of Camden	Labour		27 October 2015
107	28 January 2011 (a.m.)	Claire Tyler	Baroness Tyler of Enfield	of Enfield in the London Borough of Enfield	Liberal Democrat		
108	28 January 2011 (p.m.)	Jock Stirrup	Baron Stirrup	of Marylebone in the City of Westminster	Crossbencher		
109	31 January 2011 (a.m.)	Ruth Lister	Baroness Lister of Burtersett	of Nottingham in the County of Nottinghamshire	Labour		
110	31 January 2011 (p.m.)	Bryony Worthington	Baroness Worthington	of Cambridge in the County of Cambridgeshire	Labour		
111	1 February 2011 (a.m.)	Michael Bishop	Baron Glendonbrook	of Bowdon in the County of Cheshire	Conservative	24 July 2025	
112	1 February 2011 (p.m.)	David Gold	Baron Gold	of Westcliff-on-Sea in the County of Essex	Conservative		
113	2 February 2011 (a.m.)	Mike Storey	Baron Storey	of Childwall in the City of Liverpool	Liberal Democrat		
114	2 February 2011 (p.m.)	Nicol Stephen ‡	Baron Stephen	of Lower Deeside in the City of Aberdeen	Liberal Democrat		
115	4 February 2011 (a.m.)	Maurice Glasman	Baron Glasman	of Stoke Newington and of Stamford Hill in the London Borough of Hackney	Labour		
116	4 February 2011 (p.m.)	Sal Brinton	Baroness Brinton	of Kenardington in the County of Kent	Liberal Democrat		
117	28 February 2011	David Maclean ‡	Baron Blencathra	of Penrith in the County of Cumbria	Conservative		
118	12 October 2011	Indarjit Singh †	Baron Singh of Wimbledon	of Wimbledon in the London Borough of Merton	Crossbencher		
119	13 October 2011	Donald Curry †	Baron Curry of Kirkharle	of Kirkharle in the County of Northumberland	Crossbencher	30 April 2026	
120	10 January 2012	Gus O'Donnell	Baron O'Donnell	of Clapham in the London Borough of Wandsworth	Crossbencher		
121	26 June 2012	Beeban Kidron †	Baroness Kidron	of Angel in the London Borough of Islington	Crossbencher		
122	3 July 2012	Alexander Trees †	Baron Trees	of The Ross in Perth and Kinross	Crossbencher		
123	1 November 2012	Paul Deighton	Baron Deighton	of Carshalton in the County of Surrey	Conservative		
124	8 January 2013	Rowan Williams	Baron Williams of Oystermouth	of Oystermouth in the City and County of Swansea	Crossbencher	31 August 2020	
125	21 January 2013	John Nash	Baron Nash	of Ewelme in the County of Oxfordshire	Conservative		
126	25 March 2013	Martha Lane Fox †	Baroness Lane-Fox of Soho	of Soho in the City of Westminster	Crossbencher		
127	26 March 2013	Michael Berkeley †	Baron Berkeley of Knighton	of Knighton in the County of Powys	Crossbencher		
128	12 July 2013	Ian Livingston	Baron Livingston of Parkhead	of Parkhead in the City of Glasgow	Conservative		
129	19 July 2013	Mervyn King	Baron King of Lothbury	of Lothbury in the City of London	Crossbencher		
130	4 September 2013 (a.m.)	John Horam ‡	Baron Horam	of Grimsargh in the County of Lancashire	Conservative		24 July 2026
131	4 September 2013 (p.m.)	Rosalind Grender	Baroness Grender	of Kingston upon Thames in the London Borough of Kingston upon Thames	Liberal Democrat		
132	5 September 2013 (a.m.)	Jonathan Mendelsohn	Baron Mendelsohn	of Finchley in the London Borough of Barnet	Labour		
133	5 September 2013 (p.m.)	Ian Wrigglesworth ‡	Baron Wrigglesworth	of Norton on Tees in the County of Durham	Liberal Democrat		
134	6 September 2013 (a.m.)	Zahida Manzoor	Baroness Manzoor	of Knightsbridge in the Royal Borough of Kensington and Chelsea	Liberal Democrat		
135	6 September 2013 (p.m.)	Doreen Lawrence	Baroness Lawrence of Clarendon	of Clarendon in the Commonwealth Realm of Jamaica	Labour		
136	9 September 2013 (a.m.)	Nick Bourne	Baron Bourne of Aberystwyth	of Aberystwyth in the County of Ceredigion and of Wethersfield in the County of Essex	Conservative		
137	9 September 2013 (p.m.)	Cathy Bakewell	Baroness Bakewell of Hardington Mandeville	of Hardington Mandeville in the County of Somerset	Liberal Democrat		
138	10 September 2013 (a.m.)	Lucy Neville-Rolfe	Baroness Neville-Rolfe	of Chilmark in the County of Wiltshire	Conservative		
139	10 September 2013 (p.m.)	Mike Whitby	Baron Whitby	of Harborne in the City of Birmingham	Conservative		
140	11 September 2013 (a.m.)	Daniel Finkelstein	Baron Finkelstein	of Pinner in the County of Middlesex	Conservative		
141	11 September 2013 (p.m.)	Matthew Carrington ‡	Baron Carrington of Fulham	of Fulham in the London Borough of Hammersmith and Fulham	Conservative		
142	12 September 2013 (a.m.)	Stephen Sherbourne	Baron Sherbourne of Didsbury	of Didsbury in the City of Manchester	Conservative		
143	12 September 2013 (p.m.)	Brian Paddick	Baron Paddick	of Brixton in the London Borough of Lambeth	Liberal Democrat		
144	13 September 2013 (a.m.)	Jeremy Purvis	Baron Purvis of Tweed	of East March in the Scottish Borders	Liberal Democrat		
145	13 September 2013 (p.m.)	Chris Holmes	Baron Holmes of Richmond	of Richmond in the London Borough of Richmond upon Thames	Conservative		
146	16 September 2013 (a.m.)	Fiona Hodgson, Lady Hodgson of Astley Abbotts	Baroness Hodgson of Abinger	of Abinger in the County of Surrey	Conservative		
147	16 September 2013 (p.m.)	Howard Leigh	Baron Leigh of Hurley	of Hurley in the Royal County of Berkshire	Conservative		
148	17 September 2013 (a.m.)	Rumi Verjee	Baron Verjee	of Portobello in the Royal Borough of Kensington and Chelsea	Liberal Democrat		
149	17 September 2013 (p.m.)	Alison Suttie	Baroness Suttie	of Hawick in the Scottish Borders	Liberal Democrat		
150	18 September 2013 (a.m.)	Christine Humphreys	Baroness Humphreys	of Llanrwst in the County of Conwy	Liberal Democrat		
151	18 September 2013 (p.m.)	Willie Haughey	Baron Haughey	of Hutchesontown in the City of Glasgow	Labour		
152	19 September 2013 (a.m.)	Richard Balfe #	Baron Balfe	of Dulwich in the London Borough of Southwark	Conservative		
153	19 September 2013 (p.m.)	Alicia Kennedy, Lady Kennedy of Southwark	Baroness Kennedy of Cradley	of Cradley in the Metropolitan Borough of Dudley	Labour		
154	20 September 2013 (a.m.)	Susan Williams	Baroness Williams of Trafford	of Hale in the County of Greater Manchester	Conservative		
155	20 September 2013 (p.m.)	Jenny Jones	Baroness Jones of Moulsecoomb	of Moulsecoomb in the County of East Sussex	Green		
156	2 October 2013 (a.m.)	Charles Allen	Baron Allen of Kensington	of Kensington in the Royal Borough of Kensington and Chelsea	Labour		
157	2 October 2013 (p.m.)	James Palumbo	Baron Palumbo of Southwark	of Southwark in the London Borough of Southwark	Liberal Democrat	1 April 2026	
158	3 October 2013 (a.m.)	Anthony Bamford	Baron Bamford	of Daylesford in the County of Gloucestershire and of Wootton in the County of Staffordshire	Conservative	1 March 2024	
159	3 October 2013 (p.m.)	Annabel Goldie	Baroness Goldie	of Bishopton in the County of Renfrewshire	Conservative		
160	4 October 2013	John Thomas	Baron Thomas of Cwmgiedd	of Cwmgiedd in the County of Powys	Crossbencher		
161	24 February 2014	David Richards	Baron Richards of Herstmonceux	of Emsworth in the County of Hampshire	Crossbencher		
162	5 September 2014	Michael Farmer	Baron Farmer	of Bishopsgate in the City of London	Conservative		
163	11 September 2014 (a.m.)	Christopher Fox	Baron Fox	of Leominster in the County of Herefordshire	Liberal Democrat		
164	11 September 2014 (p.m.)	Ranbir Singh Suri	Baron Suri	of Ealing in the London Borough of Ealing	Conservative	9 March 2026	
165	12 September 2014 (a.m.)	Julie Smith	Baroness Smith of Newnham	of Crosby in the County of Merseyside	Liberal Democrat		
166	12 September 2014 (p.m.)	Natalie Evans	Baroness Evans of Bowes Park	of Bowes Park in the London Borough of Haringey	Conservative		
167	15 September 2014 (a.m.)	David Goddard	Baron Goddard of Stockport	of Stockport in the County of Greater Manchester	Liberal Democrat		
168	15 September 2014 (p.m.)	Dido Harding	Baroness Harding of Winscombe	of Nether Compton in the County of Dorset	Conservative		
169	16 September 2014 (a.m.)	Carlyn Chisholm	Baroness Chisholm of Owlpen	of Owlpen in the County of Gloucestershire	Conservative		
170	16 September 2014 (p.m.)	Joanna Shields	Baroness Shields	of Maida Vale in the City of Westminster	Conservative		
171	17 September 2014 (a.m.)	Stuart Rose	Baron Rose of Monewden	of Monewden in the County of Suffolk	Conservative		
172	17 September 2014 (p.m.)	Andrew Cooper	Baron Cooper of Windrush	of Chipping Norton in the County of Oxfordshire	Conservative		
173	18 September 2014 (a.m.)	Arminka Helic	Baroness Helic	of Millbank in the City of Westminster	Conservative		
174	18 September 2014 (p.m.)	Gail Rebuck. Lady Gould of Brookwood	Baroness Rebuck	of Bloomsbury in the London Borough of Camden	Labour		
175	19 September 2014 (a.m.)	Nosheena Mobarik #	Baroness Mobarik	of Mearns in the County of Renfrewshire	Conservative		
176	19 September 2014 (p.m.)	Paul Scriven	Baron Scriven	of Hunters Bar in the City of Sheffield	Liberal Democrat		
177	22 September 2014 (a.m.)	Christopher Lennie	Baron Lennie	of Longsands Tynemouth in the County of Tyne and Wear	Labour		
178	22 September 2014 (p.m.)	Karren Brady	Baroness Brady	of Knightsbridge in the City of Westminster	Conservative		
179	23 September 2014 (a.m.)	Michael Cashman #	Baron Cashman	of Limehouse in the London Borough of Tower Hamlets	Labour		
180	23 September 2014 (p.m.)	Kath Pinnock	Baroness Pinnock	of Cleckheaton in the County of West Yorkshire	Liberal Democrat		
181	24 September 2014 (a.m.)	Martin Callanan #	Baron Callanan	of Low Fell in the County of Tyne and Wear	Conservative		
182	24 September 2014 (p.m.)	Barbara Janke	Baroness Janke	of Clifton in the City and County of Bristol	Liberal Democrat		
183	28 November 2014	Andrew Green	Baron Green of Deddington	of Deddington in the County of Oxfordshire	Crossbencher		
184	2 December 2014	Alison Wolf	Baroness Wolf of Dulwich	of Dulwich in the London Borough of Southwark	Crossbencher		
185	3 December 2014	Jonathan Evans	Baron Evans of Weardale	of Toys Hill in the County of Kent	Crossbencher		
186	11 December 2014	Robert Rogers	Baron Lisvane	of Blakemere in the County of Herefordshire and of Lisvane in the City and County of Cardiff	Crossbencher		
187	16 December 2014	Willie Hay	Baron Hay of Ballyore	of Ballyore in the City of Londonderry	Crossbencher		
188	17 March 2015	Bob Kerslake	Baron Kerslake	of Endcliffe in the City of Sheffield	Crossbencher		1 July 2023
189	19 May 2015	Ros Altmann	Baroness Altmann	of Tottenham in the London Borough of Haringey	Conservative		
190	26 May 2015 (a.m.)	Andrew Dunlop	Baron Dunlop	of Helensburgh in the County of Dunbarton	Conservative	27 March 2026	
191	26 May 2015 (p.m.)	Francis Maude ‡	Baron Maude of Horsham	of Shipley in the County of West Sussex	Conservative		
192	28 May 2015 (a.m.)	Jim O'Neill	Baron O'Neill of Gatley	of Gatley in the County of Greater Manchester	Conservative		
193	28 May 2015 (p.m.)	George Bridges (Note: In remainder of the Barony of Bridges (United Kingdom).)	Baron Bridges of Headley	of Headley Heath in the County of Surrey	Conservative		
194	29 May 2015	David Prior ‡	Baron Prior of Brampton	of Swannington in the County of Norfolk	Conservative		
195	8 June 2015	Richard Keen	Baron Keen of Elie	of Elie in Fife	Conservative		
196	28 September 2015 (a.m.)	David Blunkett ‡	Baron Blunkett	of Brightside and Hillsborough in the City of Sheffield	Labour		
197	28 September 2015 (p.m.)	Robert Hayward ‡	Baron Hayward	of Cumnor in the County of Oxfordshire	Conservative		
198	29 September 2015 (a.m.)	Sir George Young, Bt. ‡	Baron Young of Cookham	of Cookham in the Royal County of Berkshire	Conservative		
199	29 September 2015 (p.m.)	Philip Smith	Baron Smith of Hindhead	of Hindhead in the County of Surrey	Conservative		
200	30 September 2015 (a.m.)	Stephen Gilbert	Baron Gilbert of Panteg	of Panteg in the County of Monmouthshire	Conservative		
201	30 September 2015 (p.m.)	Michelle Mone	Baroness Mone	of Mayfair in the City of Westminster	Conservative		
202	1 October 2015 (a.m.)	James Arbuthnot ‡	Baron Arbuthnot of Edrom	of Edrom in the County of Berwick	Conservative		
203	1 October 2015 (2 p.m.)	James O'Shaughnessy	Baron O'Shaughnessy	of Maidenhead in the Royal County of Berkshire	Conservative		
204	1 October 2015 (3 p.m.)	Philippa Stroud	Baroness Stroud	of Fulham in the London Borough of Hammersmith and Fulham	Conservative		
205	2 October 2015 (a.m.)	Stuart Polak	Baron Polak	of Hertsmere in the County of Hertfordshire	Conservative		
206	2 October 2015 (p.m.)	Shas Sheehan	Baroness Sheehan	of Wimbledon in the London Borough of Merton and of Tooting in the London Borough of Wandsworth	Liberal Democrat		
207	5 October 2015 (a.m.)	Andrew Lansley ‡	Baron Lansley	of Orwell in the County of Cambridgeshire	Conservative		
208	5 October 2015 (p.m.)	Jonny Oates	Baron Oates	of Denby Grange in the County of West Yorkshire	Liberal Democrat		
209	6 October 2015 (a.m.)	James Lupton	Baron Lupton	of Lovington in the County of Hampshire	Conservative		
210	6 October 2015 (p.m.)	Anne McIntosh ‡ #	Baroness McIntosh of Pickering	of the Vale of York in the County of North Yorkshire	Conservative		
211	7 October 2015 (a.m.)	Liz Redfern	Baroness Redfern	of the Isle of Axholme in the County of Lincolnshire	Conservative		
212	7 October 2015 (p.m.)	Don Foster ‡	Baron Foster of Bath	of Bath in the County of Somerset	Liberal Democrat		
213	8 October 2015 (a.m.)	Emma Pidding	Baroness Pidding	of Amersham in the County of Buckinghamshire	Conservative		
214	8 October 2015 (p.m.)	Jane Scott	Baroness Scott of Bybrook	of Upper Wraxall in the County of Wiltshire	Conservative		
215	9 October 2015 (a.m.)	William Hague ‡	Baron Hague of Richmond	of Richmond in the County of North Yorkshire	Conservative		
216	9 October 2015 (p.m.)	Lorely Burt ‡	Baroness Burt of Solihull	of Solihull in the County of West Midlands	Liberal Democrat	7 May 2026	
217	12 October 2015 (a.m.)	Douglas Hogg, 3rd Viscount Hailsham ‡	Baron Hailsham of Kettlethorpe	of Kettlethorpe in the County of Lincolnshire	Conservative		
218	12 October 2015 (p.m.)	Greg Barker ‡	Baron Barker of Battle	of Battle in the County of East Sussex	Conservative		
219	13 October 2015 (a.m.)	Andrew Robathan ‡	Baron Robathan	of Poultney in the County of Leicestershire	Conservative		
220	13 October 2015 (p.m.)	Menzies Campbell ‡	Baron Campbell of Pittenweem	of Pittenweem in the County of Fife	Liberal Democrat		26 September 2025
221	14 October 2015 (a.m.)	Kevin Shinkwin	Baron Shinkwin	of Balham in the London Borough of Wandsworth	Conservative		
222	14 October 2015 (p.m.)	Simone Finn	Baroness Finn	of Swansea in the County of West Glamorgan	Conservative		
223	15 October 2015 (a.m.)	Kate Rock	Baroness Rock	of Stratton in the County of Dorset	Conservative		
224	15 October 2015 (p.m.)	Gary Porter	Baron Porter of Spalding	of Spalding in the County of Lincolnshire	Conservative		
225	16 October 2015 (a.m.)	Ruby McGregor-Smith	Baroness McGregor-Smith	of Sunninghill in the Royal County of Berkshire	Conservative		
226	16 October 2015 (p.m.)	David Willetts ‡	Baron Willetts	of Havant in the County of Hampshire	Conservative		
227	19 October 2015 (a.m.)	Malcolm Bruce ‡	Baron Bruce of Bennachie	of Torphins in the County of Aberdeen	Liberal Democrat		
228	19 October 2015 (p.m.)	Alan Beith ‡	Baron Beith	of Berwick upon Tweed in the County of Northumberland	Liberal Democrat		
229	20 October 2015 (a.m.)	Paul Murphy ‡	Baron Murphy of Torfaen	of Abersychan in the County of Gwent	Labour		
230	20 October 2015 (p.m.)	Lynne Featherstone ‡	Baroness Featherstone	of Highgate in the London Borough of Haringey	Liberal Democrat		
231	21 October 2015 (a.m.)	Dorothy Thornhill	Baroness Thornhill	of Watford in the County of Hertfordshire	Liberal Democrat		
232	21 October 2015 (p.m.)	Spencer Livermore	Baron Livermore	of Rotherhithe in the London Borough of Southwark	Labour		
233	22 October 2015 (a.m.)	Peter Hain ‡	Baron Hain	of Neath in the County of West Glamorgan	Labour		
234	22 October 2015 (p.m.)	Catherine Fall	Baroness Fall	of Ladbroke Grove in the Royal Borough of Kensington and Chelsea	Conservative		
235	23 October 2015 (a.m.)	Sharon Bowles #	Baroness Bowles of Berkhamsted	of Bourne End in the County of Hertfordshire	Liberal Democrat		
236	23 October 2015 (p.m.)	David Watts ‡	Baron Watts	of Ravenhead in the County of Merseyside	Labour		
237	26 October 2015 (a.m.)	Andrew Stunell ‡	Baron Stunell	of Hazel Grove in the County of Greater Manchester	Liberal Democrat		29 April 2024
238	26 October 2015 (p.m.)	Dawn Primarolo ‡	Baroness Primarolo	of Windmill Hill in the City of Bristol	Labour		
239	27 October 2015	Tessa Jowell ‡	Baroness Jowell	of Brixton in the London Borough of Lambeth	Labour		12 May 2018
240	29 October 2015	Robert Mair †	Baron Mair	of Cambridge in the County of Cambridgeshire	Crossbencher		
241	30 October 2015 (a.m.)	John Bird †	Baron Bird	of Notting Hill in the Royal Borough of Kensington and Chelsea	Crossbencher		
242	30 October 2015 (p.m.)	Julia King †	Baroness Brown of Cambridge	of Cambridge in the County of Cambridgeshire	Crossbencher		
243	2 November 2015	Mary Watkins †	Baroness Watkins of Tavistock	of Buckland Monachorum in the County of Devon	Crossbencher		
244	1 December 2015	Alistair Darling ‡	Baron Darling of Roulanish	of Great Bernera in the County of Ross and Cromarty	Labour	28 July 2020	30 November 2023
245	29 February 2016	Mark Price	Baron Price	of Sturminster Newton in the County of Dorset	Conservative		

† recommended by House of Lords Appointments Commission
‡ former MP
# former MEP

== Theresa May (2016–2019) ==
Living
Living but left the House of Lords

Number	Date of creation	Name	Title	Territorial qualification	Party affiliation when taking seat	Date of retirement (if applicable)	Date of extinction (if applicable)
1	30 August 2016 (a.m.)	Liz Sugg	Baroness Sugg	of Coldharbour in the London Borough of Lambeth	Conservative		
2	30 August 2016 (p.m.)	Charlotte Vere	Baroness Vere of Norbiton	of Norbiton in the Royal Borough of Kingston upon Thames	Conservative		
3	31 August 2016 (a.m.)	Andrew Fraser	Baron Fraser of Corriegarth	of Corriegarth in the County of Inverness	Conservative		6 February 2021
4	31 August 2016 (p.m.)	Jitesh Gadhia	Baron Gadhia	of Northwood in the County of Middlesex	Conservative		
5	1 September 2016 (a.m.)	Mark McInnes	Baron McInnes of Kilwinning	of Kilwinning in the County of Ayrshire	Conservative		
6	1 September 2016 (p.m.)	Timothy Kirkhope ‡ #	Baron Kirkhope of Harrogate	of Harrogate in the County of North Yorkshire	Conservative		
7	2 September 2016 (a.m.)	Jonathan Caine	Baron Caine	of Temple Newsam in the City of Leeds	Conservative		
8	2 September 2016 (p.m.)	Gabrielle Bertin	Baroness Bertin	of Battersea in the London Borough of Wandsworth	Conservative		
9	5 September 2016 (a.m.)	Philippa Roe	Baroness Couttie	of Downe in the County of Kent	Conservative		12 December 2022
10	5 September 2016 (p.m.)	Olivia Bloomfield	Baroness Bloomfield of Hinton Waldrist	of Hinton Waldrist in the County of Oxfordshire	Conservative		
11	6 September 2016 (a.m.)	Shami Chakrabarti	Baroness Chakrabarti	of Kennington in the London Borough of Lambeth	Labour		
12	6 September 2016 (p.m.)	Camilla Cavendish	Baroness Cavendish of Little Venice	of Mells in the County of Somerset	Conservative		
13	4 October 2016	Nick Macpherson	Baron Macpherson of Earl's Court	of Earl's Court in the Royal Borough of Kensington and Chelsea	Crossbencher		
14	17 October 2016	Peter Ricketts	Baron Ricketts	of Shortlands in the County of Kent	Crossbencher		
15	20 October 2016	Edward Llewellyn	Baron Llewellyn of Steep	of Steep in the County of Hampshire	Conservative		
16	22 June 2017	Laura Wyld	Baroness Wyld	of Gosforth in the City of Newcastle upon Tyne	Conservative		
17	14 July 2017	Ian Duncan #	Baron Duncan of Springbank	of Springbank in the County of Perth	Conservative		
18	19 October 2017 (a.m.)	Rona Fairhead	Baroness Fairhead	of Yarm in the County of North Yorkshire	Conservative		
19	19 October 2017 (p.m.)	Theodore Agnew	Baron Agnew of Oulton	of Oulton in the County of Norfolk	Conservative		
20	30 October 2017	Ian Burnett	Baron Burnett of Maldon	of Maldon in the County of Essex	Non-affiliated		
21	3 November 2017	Christopher Geidt	Baron Geidt	of Crobeg in the County of Ross and Cromarty	Crossbencher		
22	7 November 2017 (a.m.)	Richard Chartres	Baron Chartres	of Wilton in the County of Wiltshire	Crossbencher		
23	7 November 2017 (p.m.)	Bernard Hogan-Howe	Baron Hogan-Howe	of Sheffield in the County of South Yorkshire	Crossbencher		
24	20 November 2017	Nick Houghton	Baron Houghton of Richmond	of Richmond in the County of North Yorkshire	Crossbencher		
25	12 June 2018	Andrew Tyrie ‡	Baron Tyrie	of Chichester in the County of West Sussex	Non-affiliated		
26	18 June 2018 (a.m.)	Eric Pickles ‡	Baron Pickles	of Brentwood and Ongar in the County of Essex	Conservative		
27	18 June 2018 (p.m.)	Peter Lilley ‡	Baron Lilley	of Offa in the County of Hertfordshire	Conservative		
28	19 June 2018 (a.m.)	William McCrea ‡	Baron McCrea of Magherafelt and Cookstown	of Magherafelt in the County of Londonderry and Cookstown in the County of Tyrone	Democratic Unionist		
29	19 June 2018 (p.m.)	Catherine Meyer	Baroness Meyer	of Nine Elms in the London Borough of Wandsworth	Conservative		
30	20 June 2018 (a.m.)	Amanda Sater	Baroness Sater	of Kensington in the Royal Borough of Kensington and Chelsea	Conservative		
31	20 June 2018 (p.m.)	Pauline Bryan	Baroness Bryan of Partick	of Partick in the City of Glasgow	Labour	25 July 2025	
32	21 June 2018 (a.m.)	Iain McNicol	Baron McNicol of West Kilbride	of West Kilbride in the County of Ayrshire	Labour		
33	21 June 2018 (p.m.)	Diana Barran	Baroness Barran	of Bathwick in the City of Bath	Conservative		
34	22 June 2018 (a.m.)	Alan Haselhurst ‡	Baron Haselhurst	of Saffron Walden in the County of Essex	Conservative	20 December 2024	1 June 2026
35	22 June 2018 (p.m.)	Edward Garnier ‡	Baron Garnier	of Harborough in the County of Leicestershire	Conservative		
36	25 June 2018	John Randall ‡	Baron Randall of Uxbridge	of Uxbridge in the London Borough of Hillingdon	Conservative		
37	9 July 2018	Rosie Boycott †	Baroness Boycott	of Whitefield in the County of Somerset	Crossbencher		
38	10 July 2018	David Anderson †	Baron Anderson of Ipswich	of Ipswich in the County of Suffolk	Crossbencher		
39	11 July 2018	Deborah Bull †	Baroness Bull	of Aldwych in the City of Westminster	Crossbencher		
40	26 October 2018	Jeremy Heywood	Baron Heywood of Whitehall	of Glossop in the County of Derbyshire	died before taking seat		4 November 2018
41	26 November 2018	Martha Osamor	Baroness Osamor	of Tottenham in the London Borough of Haringey and of Asaba in the Republic of Nigeria	Labour		
42	1 February 2019	Nicola Blackwood ‡	Baroness Blackwood of North Oxford	of North Oxford in the County of Oxfordshire	Conservative		

† recommended by House of Lords Appointments Commission
‡ former MP
# former MEP

== Boris Johnson (2019–2022) ==
Living
Living but left the House of Lords

Number	Date of creation	Name	Title	Territorial qualification	Party affiliation when taking seat	Date of retirement (if applicable)	Date of extinction (if applicable)
1	7 October 2019 (a.m.)	Natalie Bennett	Baroness Bennett of Manor Castle	of Camden in the London Borough of Camden	Green		
2	7 October 2019 (p.m.)	Gavin Barwell ‡	Baron Barwell	of Croydon in the London Borough of Croydon	Conservative		
3	8 October 2019 (a.m.)	Stephen Parkinson	Baron Parkinson of Whitley Bay	of Beyton in the County of Suffolk	Conservative		
4	8 October 2019 (p.m.)	Elizabeth Sanderson	Baroness Sanderson of Welton	of Welton in the East Riding of Yorkshire	Conservative		
5	9 October 2019 (a.m.)	Zameer Choudrey	Baron Choudrey	of Hampstead in the London Borough of Barnet	Conservative		
6	9 October 2019 (p.m.)	David Brownlow	Baron Brownlow of Shurlock Row	of Shurlock Row in the Royal County of Berkshire	Conservative		
7	10 October 2019 (a.m.)	Byron Davies ‡	Baron Davies of Gower	of Gower in the County of Swansea	Conservative		
8	10 October 2019 (p.m.)	Joanna Penn	Baroness Penn	of Teddington in the London Borough of Richmond	Conservative		
9	11 October 2019 (a.m.)	Rami Ranger	Baron Ranger	of Mayfair in the City of Westminster	Conservative		
10	11 October 2019 (p.m.)	Heather Hallett	Baroness Hallett	of Rye in the County of East Sussex	Crossbencher		
11	14 October 2019 (a.m.)	Debbie Wilcox	Baroness Wilcox of Newport	of Newport in the City of Newport	Labour		
12	14 October 2019 (p.m.)	Simon Woolley	Baron Woolley of Woodford	of Woodford in the London Borough of Redbridge	Crossbencher		
13	15 October 2019 (a.m.)	John Hendy	Baron Hendy	of Hayes and Harlington in the London Borough of Hillingdon	Labour		
14	15 October 2019 (p.m.)	Christine Blower	Baroness Blower	of Starch Green in the London Borough of Hammersmith and Fulham	Labour		
15	16 October 2019 (a.m.)	Ruth Hunt	Baroness Hunt of Bethnal Green	of Bethnal Green in the London Borough of Tower Hamlets	Crossbencher		
16	16 October 2019 (p.m.)	Margaret Ritchie ‡	Baroness Ritchie of Downpatrick	of Downpatrick in the County of Down	Non-affiliated		
17	28 October 2019	John Mann ‡	Baron Mann	of Holbeck Moor in the City of Leeds	Non-affiliated		
18	30 October 2019	Harold Carter	Baron Carter of Haslemere	of Haslemere in the County of Surrey	Crossbencher		
19	11 November 2019	Kim Darroch	Baron Darroch of Kew	of St Mawes in the County of Cornwall	Crossbencher		
20	6 January 2020	Nicky Morgan ‡	Baroness Morgan of Cotes	of Cotes in the County of Leicestershire	Conservative		
21	7 January 2020	Zac Goldsmith ‡	Baron Goldsmith of Richmond Park	of Richmond Park in the London Borough of Richmond upon Thames	Conservative		
22	11 January 2020	Robert Reed, Lord Reed	Baron Reed of Allermuir	of Sundridge Park in the London Borough of Bromley	Crossbencher		
23	8 April 2020	Gerry Grimstone	Baron Grimstone of Boscobel	of Belgravia in the City of Westminster	Conservative		
24	16 April 2020	Stephen Greenhalgh	Baron Greenhalgh	of Fulham in the London Borough of Hammersmith and Fulham	Conservative		
25	12 August 2020	David Frost	Baron Frost	of Allenton in the County of Derbyshire	Conservative		
26	1 September 2020 (a.m.)	Nick Herbert ‡	Baron Herbert of South Downs	of Arundel in the County of West Sussex	Conservative		
27	1 September 2020 (p.m.)	Ed Vaizey ‡	Baron Vaizey of Didcot	of Wantage in the County of Oxfordshire	Conservative		
28	2 September 2020 (a.m.)	James Wharton ‡	Baron Wharton of Yarm	of Yarm in the County of North Yorkshire	Conservative		
29	2 September 2020 (p.m.)	Ian Austin ‡	Baron Austin of Dudley	of Dudley in the County of West Midlands	Non-affiliated		
30	3 September 2020 (a.m.)	Helena Morrissey	Baroness Morrissey	of Chapel Green in the Royal County of Berkshire	Conservative		
31	3 September 2020 (p.m.)	Katy Clark ‡	Baroness Clark of Kilwinning	of Kilwinning in the County of Ayrshire	Labour	11 May 2026	
32	4 September 2020 (a.m.)	John Woodcock ‡	Baron Walney	of the Isle of Walney in the County of Cumbria	Non-affiliated		
33	4 September 2020 (p.m.)	Kenneth Clarke ‡	Baron Clarke of Nottingham	of West Bridgford in the County of Nottinghamshire	Conservative		
34	7 September 2020 (a.m.)	Gisela Stuart ‡	Baroness Stuart of Edgbaston	of Edgbaston in the City of Birmingham	Non-affiliated		
35	7 September 2020 (p.m.)	Lorraine Fullbrook ‡	Baroness Fullbrook	of Dogmersfield in the County of Hampshire	Conservative		
36	8 September 2020 (a.m.)	Aamer Sarfraz	Baron Sarfraz	of Kensington in the Royal London Borough of Kensington and Chelsea	Conservative		
37	8 September 2020 (p.m.)	Patrick McLoughlin ‡	Baron McLoughlin	of Cannock Chase in the County of Staffordshire	Conservative		
38	9 September 2020 (a.m.)	Sue Hayman ‡	Baroness Hayman of Ullock	of Ullock in the County of Cumbria	Labour		
39	9 September 2020 (p.m.)	Daniel Moylan	Baron Moylan	of Kensington in the Royal London Borough of Kensington and Chelsea	Conservative		
40	10 September 2020 (a.m.)	Ian Botham	Baron Botham	of Ravensworth in the County of North Yorkshire	Crossbencher		
41	10 September 2020 (p.m.)	Prem Sikka	Baron Sikka	of Kingswood in Basildon in the County of Essex	Labour		
42	11 September 2020 (a.m.)	Frank Field ‡	Baron Field of Birkenhead	of Birkenhead in the County of Merseyside	Non-affiliated		23 April 2024
43	11 September 2020 (p.m.)	Mark Sedwill	Baron Sedwill	of Sherborne in the County of Dorset	Crossbencher		
44	14 September 2020 (a.m.)	Claire Fox #	Baroness Fox of Buckley	of Buckley in the County of Flintshire	Non-affiliated		
45	14 September 2020 (p.m.)	Kate Hoey ‡	Baroness Hoey	of Lylehill and Rathlin in the County of Antrim	Non-affiliated		
46	15 September 2020 (a.m.)	Veronica Wadley	Baroness Fleet	of Hampstead in the London Borough of Camden	Conservative		
47	15 September 2020 (p.m.)	Andrew Sharpe	Baron Sharpe of Epsom	of Epsom in the County of Surrey	Conservative		
48	16 September 2020 (a.m.)	Mark Lancaster ‡	Baron Lancaster of Kimbolton	of Kimbolton in the County of Cambridgeshire	Conservative		
49	16 September 2020 (p.m.)	Neil Mendoza	Baron Mendoza	of King's Reach in the City of London	Conservative		
50	17 September 2020 (a.m.)	Charles Moore	Baron Moore of Etchingham	of Etchingham in the County of East Sussex	Non-affiliated		
51	17 September 2020 (p.m.)	Michael Spencer	Baron Spencer of Alresford	of Alresford in the County of Hampshire	Conservative		
52	18 September 2020 (a.m.)	Bryn Davies	Baron Davies of Brixton	of Brixton in the London Borough of Lambeth	Labour		
53	18 September 2020 (p.m.)	Nigel Dodds ‡	Baron Dodds of Duncairn	of Duncairn in the City of Belfast	Democratic Unionist		
54	30 September 2020 (a.m.)	Minouche Shafik	Baroness Shafik	of Camden in the London Borough of Camden and of Alexandria in the Arab Republic of Egypt	Crossbencher		
55	30 September 2020 (p.m.)	Philip Hammond ‡	Baron Hammond of Runnymede	of Runnymede in the County of Surrey	Conservative		
56	12 October 2020	Jo Johnson ‡	Baron Johnson of Marylebone	of Marylebone in the City of Westminster	Conservative		
57	30 October 2020	Louise Casey	Baroness Casey of Blackstock	of Finsbury in the London Borough of Islington	Crossbencher		
58	2 November 2020	Tony Woodley	Baron Woodley	of Wallasey in the Metropolitan Borough of Wirral	Labour		
59	5 November 2020	Henry Bellingham ‡	Baron Bellingham	of Congham in the County of Norfolk	Conservative		
60	6 November 2020 (a.m.)	Edward Lister	Baron Udny-Lister	of Wandsworth in the London Borough of Wandsworth	Conservative		
61	6 November 2020 (p.m.)	Keith Stewart	Baron Stewart of Dirleton	of Dirleton in the County of East Lothian	Conservative		
62	19 November 2020	Evgeny Lebedev	Baron Lebedev	of Hampton in the London Borough of Richmond upon Thames and of Siberia in the Russian Federation	Crossbencher		
63	23 December 2020	Terence Etherton	Baron Etherton	of Marylebone in the City of Westminster	Crossbencher		6 May 2025
64	30 December 2020	David Wolfson	Baron Wolfson of Tredegar	of Tredegar in the County of Gwent	Conservative		
65	25 January 2021 (a.m.)	Daniel Hannan #	Baron Hannan of Kingsclere	of Kingsclere in the County of Hampshire	Conservative		
66	25 January 2021 (p.m.)	Dean Godson	Baron Godson	of Thorney Island in the City of Westminster	Conservative		
67	26 January 2021 (a.m.)	Richard Benyon ‡	Baron Benyon	of Englefield in the Royal County of Berkshire	Conservative		
68	26 January 2021 (p.m.)	Stephanie Fraser	Baroness Fraser of Craigmaddie	of Craigmaddie in the County of Stirlingshire	Conservative		
69	27 January 2021 (a.m.)	Simon McDonald	Baron McDonald of Salford	of Pendleton in the City of Salford	Crossbencher		
70	27 January 2021 (p.m.)	Peter Cruddas	Baron Cruddas	of Shoreditch in the London Borough of Hackney	Conservative		
71	28 January 2021 (a.m.)	Syed Kamall #	Baron Kamall	of Edmonton in the London Borough of Enfield	Conservative		
72	28 January 2021 (p.m.)	Gillian Merron ‡	Baroness Merron	of Lincoln in the County of Lincolnshire	Labour		
73	29 January 2021 (a.m.)	Andrew Parker	Baron Parker of Minsmere	of Minsmere in the County of Suffolk	Crossbencher		
74	29 January 2021 (p.m.)	Jacqueline Foster #	Baroness Foster of Oxton	of Oxton in the County of Merseyside	Conservative		
75	1 February 2021 (a.m.)	Judith Blake	Baroness Blake of Leeds	of Gledhow in the City of Leeds	Labour		
76	1 February 2021 (p.m.)	Jenny Chapman ‡	Baroness Chapman of Darlington	of Darlington in the County of Durham	Labour		
77	3 February 2021	Vernon Coaker ‡	Baron Coaker	of Gedling in the County of Nottinghamshire	Labour		
78	4 February 2021	Wajid Khan #	Baron Khan of Burnley	of Burnley in the County of Lancashire	Labour		
79	26 March 2021	Amyas Morse †	Baron Morse	of Aldeburgh in the County of Suffolk	Crossbencher		
80	26 April 2021	Sue Black †	Baroness Black of Strome	of Strome in the County of Ross-shire	Crossbencher		
81	27 April 2021	John Sentamu	Baron Sentamu	of Lindisfarne in the County of Northumberland and of Masooli in the Republic of Uganda	Crossbencher		
82	5 July 2021	Simon Stevens	Baron Stevens of Birmingham	of Richmond upon Thames in the London Borough of Richmond upon Thames	Crossbencher		
83	16 July 2021	Ruth Davidson	Baroness Davidson of Lundin Links	of Lundin Links in the County of Fife	Conservative		
84	13 October 2021	Malcolm Offord	Baron Offord of Garvel	of Greenock in the County of Renfrewshire	Conservative	30 January 2026	
85	15 March 2022	Richard Harrington ‡	Baron Harrington of Watford	of Watford in the County of Hertfordshire	Conservative		
86	14 June 2022	Christopher Bellamy	Baron Bellamy	of Waddesdon in the County of Buckinghamshire	Conservative		
87	24 June 2022	Shaista Gohir †	Baroness Gohir	of Hall Green in the City of Birmingham	Crossbencher		
88	8 July 2022	Katherine Willis †	Baroness Willis of Summertown	of Summertown in the City of Oxford	Crossbencher		

† recommended by House of Lords Appointments Commission
‡ former MP
# former MEP

== Liz Truss (2022) ==
Living

Number	Date of creation	Name	Title	Territorial qualification	Party affiliation when taking seat	Date of retirement (if applicable)	Date of extinction (if applicable)
1	7 October 2022	Nick Markham	Baron Markham	of East Horsley in the County of Surrey	Conservative		
2	19 October 2022	Dominic Johnson	Baron Johnson of Lainston	of Lainston in the County of Hampshire	Conservative		
3	21 October 2022	Simon Murray	Baron Murray of Blidworth	of Blidworth in the County of Nottinghamshire	Conservative		

== Rishi Sunak (2022–2024) ==
Living
Living but left the House of Lords

Number	Date of creation	Name	Title	Territorial qualification	Party affiliation when taking seat	Date of retirement (if applicable)	Date of extinction (if applicable)
1	28 October 2022 (a.m.)	Nicholas Soames ‡	Baron Soames of Fletching	of Fletching in the County of East Sussex	Conservative		
2	28 October 2022 (p.m.)	Sharon Taylor	Baroness Taylor of Stevenage	of Stevenage in the County of Hertfordshire	Labour		
3	31 October 2022 (a.m.)	Sonny Leong	Baron Leong	of Chilton in the County of Oxfordshire and of Camden Town in the London Borough of Camden	Labour		
4	31 October 2022 (p.m.)	Ruth Lea	Baroness Lea of Lymm	of Lymm in the Borough of Warrington in the County of Cheshire	Conservative	30 April 2026	
5	1 November 2022 (a.m.)	Andrew Roberts	Baron Roberts of Belgravia	of Belgravia in the City of Westminster	Conservative		
6	1 November 2022 (p.m.)	Hugo Swire ‡	Baron Swire	of Down Saint Mary in the County of Devon	Conservative		
7	2 November 2022 (a.m.)	Guglielmo Verdirame	Baron Verdirame	of Belsize Park in the London Borough of Camden	Non-affiliated		
8	2 November 2022 (p.m.)	Kuldip Singh Sahota	Baron Sahota	of Telford in the County of Shropshire	Labour		
9	3 November 2022 (a.m.)	Michael Hintze	Baron Hintze	of Dunster in the County of Somerset	Conservative		
10	3 November 2022 (p.m.)	Sheila Lawlor	Baroness Lawlor	of Midsummer Common in the City of Cambridge	Conservative		
11	7 November 2022 (a.m.)	Teresa O'Neill	Baroness O'Neill of Bexley	of Crook Log in the London Borough of Bexley	Conservative		
12	7 November 2022 (p.m.)	Fiona Twycross	Baroness Twycross	of Headington in the City of Oxford	Labour		
13	8 November 2022 (a.m.)	Angie Bray ‡	Baroness Bray of Coln	of Coln Saint Aldwyns in the County of Gloucestershire	Conservative		
14	8 November 2022 (p.m.)	Dambisa Moyo	Baroness Moyo	of Knightsbridge in the City of Westminster	Conservative		
15	9 November 2022 (a.m.)	Graham Evans ‡	Baron Evans of Rainow	of Macclesfield in the County of Cheshire	Conservative		
16	9 November 2022 (p.m.)	Arlene Foster	Baroness Foster of Aghadrumsee	of Aghadrumsee in the County of Fermanagh	Non-affiliated		
17	16 November 2022 (a.m.)	Peter Weir	Baron Weir of Ballyholme	of Ballyholme in the County of Down	Democratic Unionist		
18	16 November 2022 (p.m.)	Stewart Jackson ‡	Baron Jackson of Peterborough	of Peterborough in the County of Cambridgeshire	Conservative		
19	17 November 2022 (a.m.)	Peter Hendy	Baron Hendy of Richmond Hill	of Imber in the County of Wiltshire	Crossbencher		
20	17 November 2022 (p.m.)	Kate Lampard	Baroness Lampard	of Frinsted in the County of Kent	Conservative		
21	18 November 2022 (a.m.)	Ruth Smeeth ‡	Baroness Anderson of Stoke-on-Trent	of Stoke-on-Trent in the County of Staffordshire	Labour		
22	18 November 2022 (p.m.)	Dave Prentis	Baron Prentis of Leeds	of Harehills in the City of Leeds	Labour		
23	21 November 2022 (a.m.)	Stuart Peach	Baron Peach	of Grantham in the County of Lincolnshire	Crossbencher		
24	21 November 2022 (p.m.)	Tom Watson ‡	Baron Watson of Wyre Forest	of Kidderminster in the County of Worcestershire	Labour		
25	9 December 2022	Frances O'Grady	Baroness O'Grady of Upper Holloway	of Wood Farm in the City of Oxford	Labour		
26	16 December 2022	Tony Sewell	Baron Sewell of Sanderstead	of Sanderstead in the County of Surrey	Conservative		
27	13 June 2023	Edward Young	Baron Young of Old Windsor	of Old Windsor in the Royal County of Berkshire	Crossbencher		
28	19 June 2023	Darren Mott	Baron Mott	of Chatteris in the County of Cambridgeshire	Conservative		
29	20 June 2023	Kay Swinburne #	Baroness Swinburne	of Llandysul in the County of Ceredigion	Conservative		
30	10 July 2023 (a.m.)	Benjamin Gascoigne	Baron Gascoigne	of Pendle in the County of Lancashire	Conservative		
31	10 July 2023 (p.m.)	Shaun Bailey	Baron Bailey of Paddington	of Paddington in the City of Westminster	Conservative		
32	11 July 2023 (a.m.)	Ross Kempsell	Baron Kempsell	of Letchworth in the County of Hertfordshire	Conservative		
33	11 July 2023 (p.m.)	Kulveer Ranger	Baron Ranger of Northwood	of Pimlico in the City of Westminster	Conservative		
34	12 July 2023 (a.m.)	Charlotte Owen	Baroness Owen of Alderley Edge	of Alderley Edge in the County of Cheshire	Conservative		
35	12 July 2023 (p.m.)	Ben Houchen	Baron Houchen of High Leven	of Ingleby Barwick in the Borough of Stockton-on-Tees	Conservative		
36	13 July 2023	Dan Rosenfield	Baron Rosenfield	of Muswell Hill in the London Borough of Haringey	Non-affiliated		
37	6 November 2023	Sue Carr	Baroness Carr of Walton-on-the-Hill	of Walton-on-the-Hill in the County of Surrey	Non-affiliated		
38	17 November 2023	David Cameron ‡	Baron Cameron of Chipping Norton	of Chipping Norton in the County of Oxfordshire	Conservative		
39	15 December 2023	Robbie Douglas-Miller	Baron Douglas-Miller	of The Hopes in the County of East Lothian	Conservative		
40	6 February 2024 (a.m.)	Jon Moynihan	Baron Moynihan of Chelsea	of Chelsea in the Royal Borough of Kensington and Chelsea	Conservative		
41	6 February 2024 (p.m.)	Matthew Elliott	Baron Elliott of Mickle Fell	of Barwick-in-Elmet in the City of Leeds	Conservative		
42	13 February 2024	Ruth Porter	Baroness Porter of Fulwood	of Fulwood in the City of Sheffield	Conservative		
43	4 March 2024	Donald Cameron of Lochiel	Baron Cameron of Lochiel	of Achnacarry in the County of Inverness	Conservative		
44	6 March 2024 (a.m.)	Charles Banner	Baron Banner	of Barnt Green in the County of Worcestershire	Conservative		
45	6 March 2024 (p.m.)	Gerald Shamash	Baron Shamash	of West Didsbury in the City of Manchester	Labour		
46	7 March 2024 (a.m.)	Franck Petitgas	Baron Petitgas	of Bosham in the County of West Sussex	Conservative		
47	7 March 2024 (p.m.)	Peter Booth	Baron Booth	of Houghton-le-Spring in the City of Sunderland	Conservative		
48	8 March 2024 (a.m.)	John Fuller	Baron Fuller	of Gorleston-on-Sea in the County of Norfolk	Conservative		
49	8 March 2024 (p.m.)	Stuart Marks	Baron Marks of Hale	of Hale in the County of Greater Manchester	Conservative		
50	11 March 2024 (a.m.)	Paul Goodman ‡	Baron Goodman of Wycombe	of High Wycombe in the County of Buckinghamshire	Conservative		
51	11 March 2024 (p.m.)	James Jamieson	Baron Jamieson	of Maulden in the County of Bedfordshire	Conservative		
52	12 March 2024 (a.m.)	Rosa Monckton	Baroness Monckton of Dallington Forest	of Earlsdown in the County of East Sussex	Conservative		
53	12 March 2024 (p.m.)	John Hannett	Baron Hannett of Everton	of Bramley-Moore Dock in the City of Liverpool	Labour		
54	13 March 2024 (a.m.)	Carmen Smith	Baroness Smith of Llanfaes	of Llanfaes in the County of Ynys Môn	Plaid Cymru		
55	13 March 2024 (p.m.)	Jane Ramsey	Baroness Ramsey of Wall Heath	of Dulwich in the London Borough of Southwark	Labour		
56	14 March 2024	Ayesha Hazarika	Baroness Hazarika	of Coatbridge in the County of Lanarkshire	Labour		
57	5 June 2024	Alexandra Freeman †	Baroness Freeman of Steventon	of Abingdon in the County of Oxfordshire	Crossbencher		
58	10 June 2024	Lionel Tarassenko †	Baron Tarassenko	of Headington in the City of Oxford	Crossbencher		

† recommended by House of Lords Appointments Commission
‡ former MP
# former MEP

== See also ==
- List of life peerages
- List of hereditary peers in the House of Lords by virtue of a life peerage
