= Rami Ranger, Baron Ranger =

British-Indian businessman (born 1947)

The Right Honourable The Lord Ranger BA
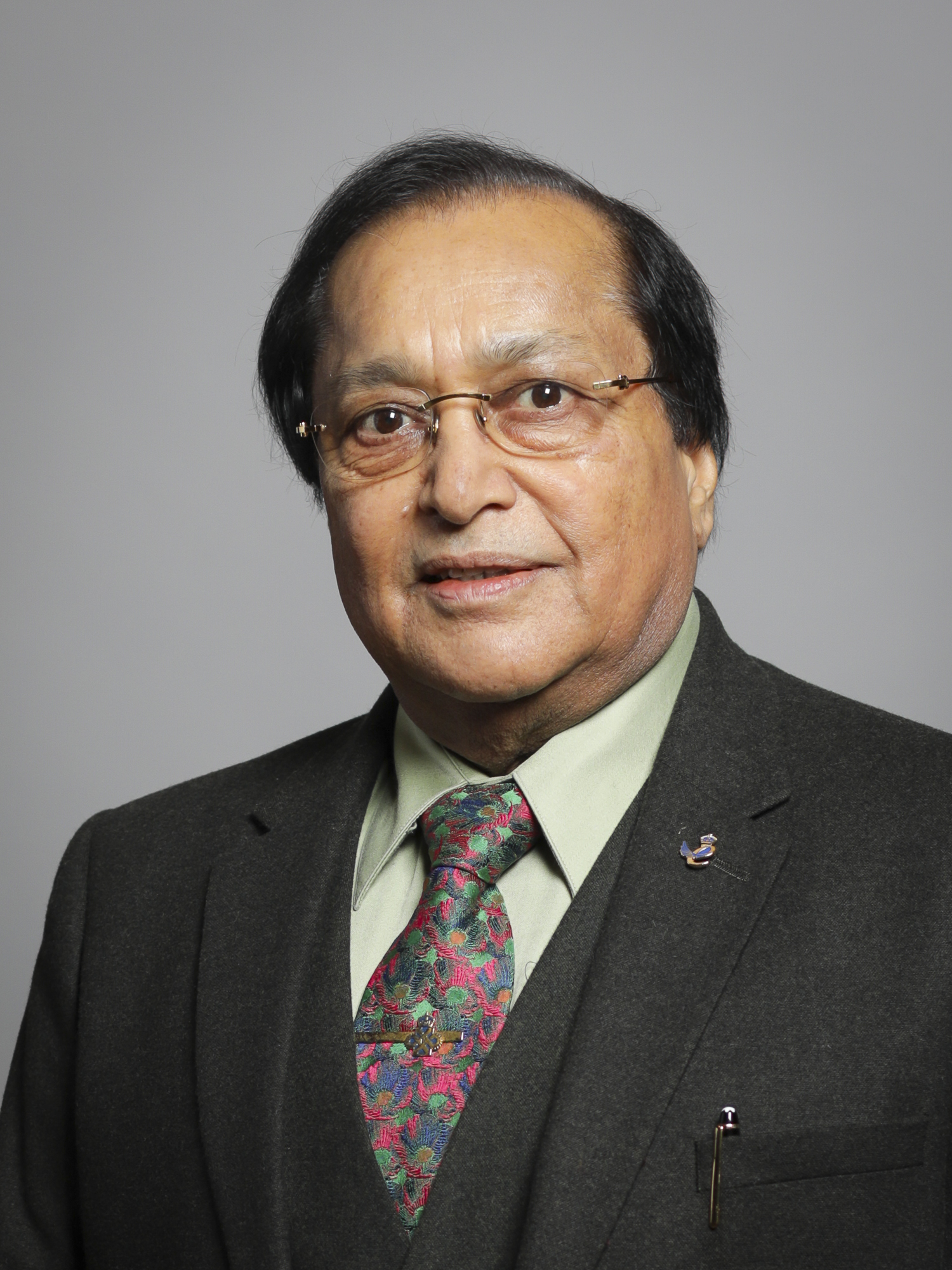
- Official portrait, 2019

Member of the House of Lords
- Lord Temporal
- Life peerage 11 October 2019

Personal details
- Born: Raminder Singh Ranger; 3 July 1947 (age 79) Gujranwala, British India (now Pakistan)
- Party: Conservative
- Other political affiliations: Non-affiliated (2023–2024)
- Spouse: Renu Ranger
- Children: 3, including Reena
- Occupation: Businessman

Raminder Singh Ranger, Baron Ranger (born 3 July 1947), is a British-Indian businessman and Conservative Party politician. He is the founder of Sun Mark, a multinational consumer-goods company, and has been a member of the House of Lords since 2019.

Born in Gujranwala, Punjab, just before the partition of India, Ranger was raised by his widowed mother in Patiala. He moved to the United Kingdom in 1971, and founded the shipping company Sea, Air and Land Forwarding in 1987, followed by Sun Mark in 1995. Ranger is a donor to the Conservative Party and served as a co-chairman of Conservative Friends of India. He was nominated for a life peerage in Theresa May's resignation honours in 2019.

In 2023, the House of Lords Commissioner for Standards found that Ranger bullied and harassed a journalist following a Diwali event in Parliament. After further revelations of derogatory comments about Pakistanis and Sikhs, Ranger's CBE appointment was revoked by the Honours Forfeiture Committee in 2024.

== Early life and education ==
Raminder Singh Ranger was born on 3 July 1947 in Gujranwala, then in the Punjab Province of British India (now Pakistan), as the son of Sardar Nanak Singh and Harbans Kaur. His father, an opponent of the planned partition of India, was assassinated about four months before Ranger was born. Shortly after his birth, the family moved to Patiala in Indian Punjab as refugees of the partition, and Ranger was raised with seven siblings by his widowed mother.

Ranger attended Mohindra College in Patiala, and obtained a Bachelor of Arts (BA) degree from the Government College in Chandigarh. He travelled to London to study law in 1971, but discontinued his studies because of a lack of funds.

== Business career ==
Ranger took up odd jobs after migrating to the United Kingdom, including working as a KFC chef in Norbury, south London, before being promoted to district manager. He subsequently operated a Post Office branch and newsagent's shop, and worked at Currys. In 1987, Ranger founded Sea, Air and Land Forwarding, a freight and logistics company, with £2 of capital and a typewriter. He founded Sun Mark, a fast-moving consumer goods export company, in 1995. Under Ranger's chairmanship, Sea, Air and Land Forwarding won a Queen's Award for Export Achievement in 1999, and Sun Mark won Queen's Awards for Enterprise in international trade from 2009 to 2013, becoming the first company to win the award in five consecutive years.

== Political career ==
Ranger is a major donor to the Conservative Party. Through Sun Mark, he donated £25,000 to Theresa May's party leadership campaign in 2016. He gave £1.5 million in total to the Conservative Party from 2009 to 2024.

In 2018, alongside MP Zac Goldsmith, Ranger was appointed a co-chairman of Conservative Friends of India, linking the party with the British-Indian community and supporting stronger India–United Kingdom relations. Ranger is a founding member of the Pakistan, India and UK Friendship Forum, the Hindu Forum of Britain, and the British Sikh Association.

May nominated Ranger for a life peerage in her resignation honours list. He was created Baron Ranger, of Mayfair in the City of Westminster, on 11 October 2019, and was introduced to the House of Lords on 29 October. He made his maiden speech in an International Women's Day debate in March 2020.

After a series of controversies, the Conservatives withdrew the party whip from Ranger in September 2023, but did not disclose this to parliamentary authorities until a year later. The whip was restored to him in November 2024.

== Controversies ==
In 2020, an employment tribunal at Watford ruled that, in a 2018 phone call, Ranger victimised, harassed and discriminated against a female employee who complained about workplace harassment, contrary to the Equality Act 2010. His words were found to have had the effect of "violating the claimant's dignity and creating an intimidating, hostile, degrading, humiliating and offensive environment for her". On appeal, the Employment Appeal Tribunal upheld the findings of harassment and discrimination against Ranger but allowed the claim of victimisation to be reheard; that claim was later withdrawn by the employee. Ranger won a subsequent legal case in which the employee's £673,000 compensation claim was struck out.

In 2022, the House of Lords Commissioner for Standards initiated an investigation into Ranger following a complaint by Poonam Joshi, a female journalist who accused him of bullying and harassment. Joshi was investigating Ranger's alleged links to Nithyananda, a controversial Indian guru, a representative of whom was invited to a Diwali event hosted by Ranger at the Palace of Westminster in October 2022. The commissioner's report, published in June 2023, found that Ranger bullied and harassed Joshi through a series of tweets and WhatsApp messages. He apologised to Joshi, and promised to undertake social-media training and re-attend a seminar on the parliamentary behaviour code, in lieu of being suspended from Parliament.

Ranger wrote to BBC director-general Tim Davie in January 2023 to complain about the documentary series India: The Modi Question, which examined Indian prime minister Narendra Modi's role in the 2002 Gujarat riots; in his letter, Ranger demanded to know whether the BBC's "Pakistani-origin staff were behind this nonsense". He withdrew his comments after they were accused of being "racially charged".

== Honours ==
Ranger was appointed Member of the Order of the British Empire (MBE) in the 2005 Birthday Honours for services to business and the Asian community, and promoted to Commander of the Order of the British Empire (CBE) in the 2016 New Year Honours for services to business and community cohesion. He was awarded honorary degrees by the University of West London in 2016, the University of Wolverhampton in 2021, and London South Bank University in 2022.

Ranger's CBE appointment was revoked in December 2024 for "bringing the honours system into disrepute". The Honours Forfeiture Committee was understood to have considered Ranger's bullying and harassment of Joshi, as well as derogatory comments about the Pakistani and Sikh communities, in deciding to strip Ranger of the honour. In 2026, it was reported that Ranger was suing Prime Minister Keir Starmer, claiming that the decision to revoke the honour posed a threat to free speech and made him a victim of cancel culture.

== Personal life ==
Ranger and his wife Renu have three daughters. His eldest daughter, Reena Ranger, is also a Conservative politician, and succeeded him as the co-chairman of Conservative Friends of India. She is married to Harmeet "Sunny" Ahuja, who is the CEO of Sun Mark and the Ranger family businesses.

Orders of precedence in the United Kingdom
Preceded by The Lord Davies of Gower	Gentlemen; Baron Ranger	Followed by The Lord Hendy
