= Lord Hendy =

Lord Hendy may refer to:

- John Hendy, Baron Hendy (born 1948), English barrister and Labour politician, elder brother of Peter Hendy
- Peter Hendy, Baron Hendy of Richmond Hill (born 1953), British transport executive and government minister, younger brother of John Hendy
