= Lord Carter =

Lord Carter may refer to

- Denis Carter, Baron Carter (1932–2006), British agriculturalist and politician
- Stephen Carter, Baron Carter of Barnes (born 1964), Scottish businessman and politician
- Patrick Carter, Baron Carter of Coles (born 1946), British review panel chairman
- Harold Carter, Baron Carter of Haslemere (born 1958), British lawyer

== See also ==
- Mark Bonham Carter, Baron Bonham-Carter (1922–1994), English publisher and politician
