= 2019 Prime Minister's Resignation Honours =

British government recognitions

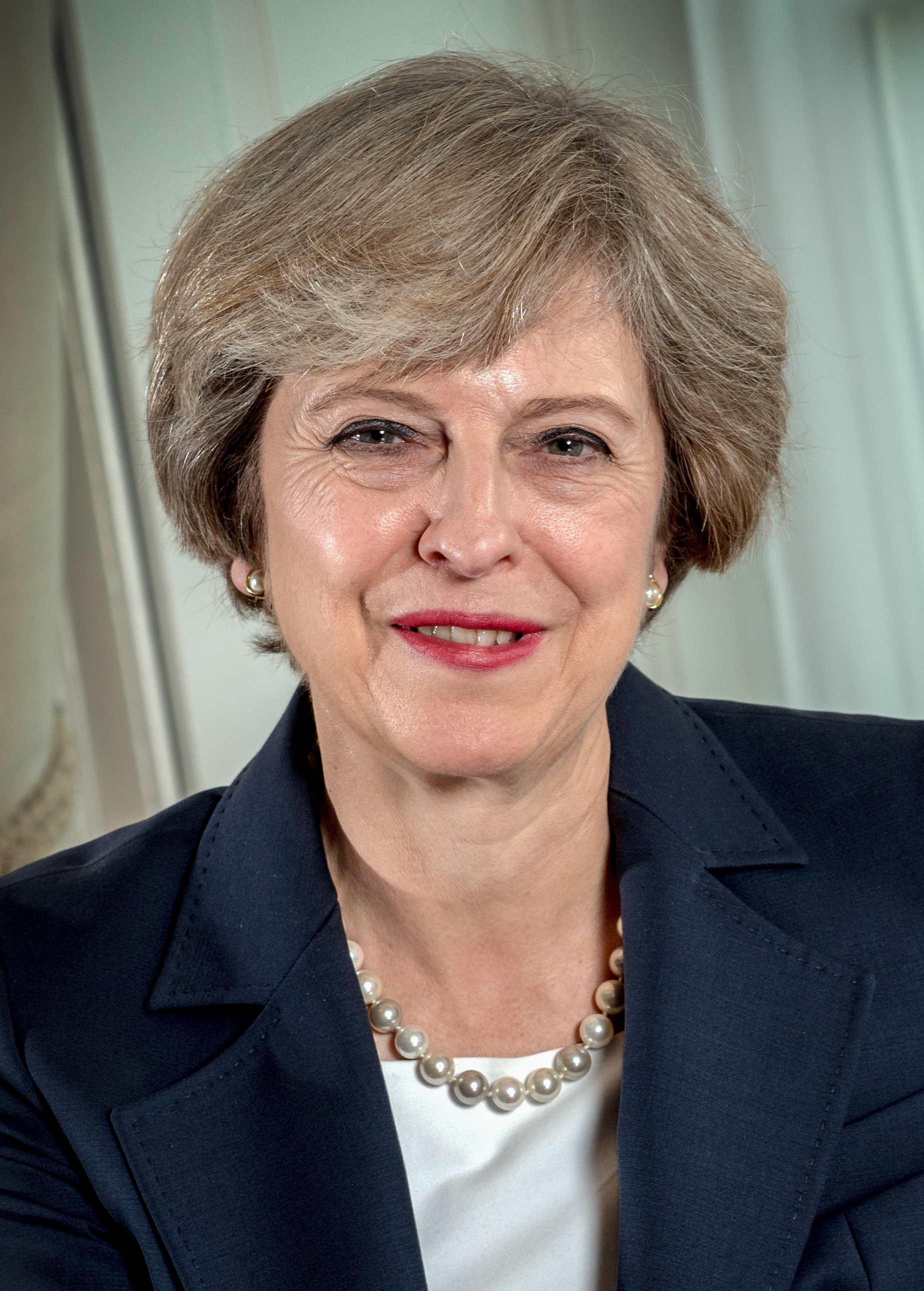
Theresa May in 2016

The 2019 Prime Minister's Resignation Honours are honours awarded following the July 2019 resignation of the Prime Minister, Theresa May. The life peerages and other honours were issued as two separate lists by the Cabinet Office on 10 September 2019, while the honours were gazetted as one list on 28 October 2019.

== Life peerages ==
=== Conservative nominations ===
- The Rt Hon Gavin Barwell, to be Baron Barwell, of Croydon in the London Borough of Croydon
- David Brownlow CVO DL, to be Baron Brownlow of Shurlock Row, of Shurlock Row in the Royal County of Berkshire
- Zameer Choudrey CBE, to be Baron Choudrey, of Hampstead in the London Borough of Barnet
- Byron Davies, to be Baron Davies of Gower, of Gower in the County of Swansea
- Stephen Parkinson, to be Baron Parkinson of Whitley Bay, of Beyton in the County of Suffolk
- Joanna Penn, to be Baroness Penn, of Teddington in the London Borough of Richmond
- Rami Ranger CBE, to be Baron Ranger, of Mayfair in the City of Westminster
- Elizabeth Sanderson, to be Baroness Sanderson of Welton, of Welton in the East Riding of Yorkshire

=== Crossbench nominations ===
- Harold Carter CB, to be Baron Carter of Haslemere, of Haslemere in the County of Surrey
- Sir Kim Darroch KCMG, to be Baron Darroch of Kew, of St Mawes in the County of Cornwall
- The Rt Hon Lady Justice Hallett DBE, to be Baroness Hallett, of Rye in the County of East Sussex
- Ruth Hunt, to be Baroness Hunt of Bethnal Green, of Bethnal Green in the London Borough of Tower Hamlets
- Sir Simon Woolley, to be Baron Woolley of Woodford, of Woodford in the London Borough of Redbridge

=== Green Party nominations ===
- Natalie Bennett, to be Baroness Bennett of Manor Castle, of Camden in the London Borough of Camden

=== Labour nominations ===
- Christine Blower, to be Baroness Blower, of Starch Green in the London Borough of Hammersmith and Fulham
- John Hendy QC, to be Baron Hendy, of Hayes and Harlington in the London Borough of Hillingdon
- Cllr Debbie Wilcox, to be Baroness Wilcox of Newport, of Newport in the City of Newport

=== Non-affiliated nominations ===
- John Mann MP, to be Baron Mann, of Holbeck Moor in the City of Leeds
- Margaret Ritchie, to be Baroness Ritchie of Downpatrick, of Downpatrick in the County of Down

== Order of the Companions of Honour ==
=== Member (CH) ===
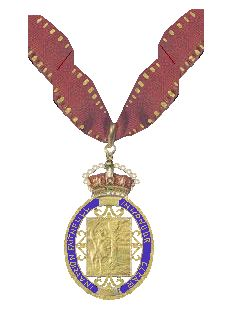
The riband and badge of the "Companions of Honour"

- The Rt Hon. Sir Patrick McLoughlin, MP – Member of Parliament for Derbyshire Dales and former Chancellor of the Duchy of Lancaster and Chairman of the Conservative & Unionist Party. For political and public service.

== Knights Bachelor ==
- Geoffrey Boycott, OBE – Former Captain of the English national cricket team and Captain of Yorkshire County Cricket Club. For services to sport.
- Ashley Fox – Lately Member of the European Parliament for South West England & Gibraltar, and Leader of the Conservative delegation in the European Parliament. For political and public service.
- Robbie Gibb – Lately Director of Communications, 10 Downing Street. For political and public service.
- Andrew Strauss, OBE – Former Captain of the English national cricket team. For services to sport.
- Ehud Sheleg – Treasurer of the Conservative & Unionist Party. For political and public service

== The Most Honourable Order of the Bath ==
=== Knight / Dame Commander of the Order of the Bath (KCB / DCB) ===
==== Civil Division ====
- The Rt Hon. David Lidington, CBE, MP – Member of Parliament for Aylesbury and former Chancellor of the Duchy of Lancaster. For political and public service.
- Peter Storr, CB – Lately European Adviser to the Prime Minister. For public service.

=== Companion of the Order of the Bath (CB) ===
==== Civil Division ====
- Peter Hill – Principal Private Secretary to the Prime Minister and former Director of Strategy, Foreign & Commonwealth Office. For public service.

== The Most Distinguished Order of Saint Michael and Saint George ==
=== Knight / Dame Commander of the Order of St Michael and St George (KCMG / DCMG) ===
- George Hollingbery, MP – Member of Parliament for Meon Valley and former Minister of State for Trade Policy and Parliamentary Private Secretary to the Prime Minister. For political and public service.
- Oliver Robbins, CB – Lately the Prime Minister's Europe Adviser and Chief Negotiator for Exiting the European Union. For public service.

== The Most Excellent Order of the British Empire ==
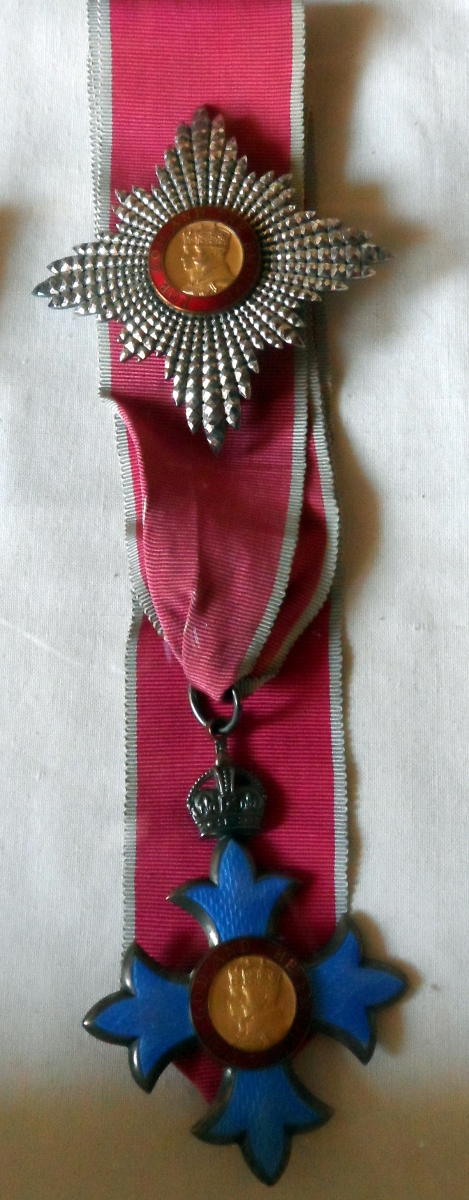
Insignia of a Knight Commander of the Order of the British Empire

=== Knight / Dame Commander of the Order of the British Empire (KBE / DBE) ===
==== Civil division ====
- Cressida Dick, CBE, QPM – Commissioner of the Metropolitan Police Service. For public service.
- Charles Walker, OBE, MP – Member of Parliament for Broxbourne and Chairman of the House of Commons Procedure Committee. For political and public service.

=== Commander of the Order of the British Empire (CBE) ===
==== Civil division ====
- Jackson Carlaw, MSP – Member of the Scottish Parliament for Eastwood and Interim Leader of the Scottish Conservative & Unionist Party. For political and public service.
- Ian Gallen – Consultant physician and endocrinologist, Royal Berkshire Hospital. For services to public health.
- Fiona Hill – Former Joint Chief of Staff to the Prime Minister and Special Adviser to the Home Secretary. For political and public service.
- Richard Jackson, MBE – Lately Head of Operations, 10 Downing Street and former Head of Operations, the Conservative & Unionist Party. For political and public service.
- The Rt Hon. Brandon Lewis, MP – Member of Parliament for Great Yarmouth and Minister of State, Home Office. Formerly Chairman of the Conservative & Unionist Party. For political and public service.
- James Marshall – Lately Director of the Prime Minister's Policy Unit, 10 Downing Street. For political and public service.
- James Slack – Prime Minister's Official Spokesman, 10 Downing Street. For public service.
- The Rt Hon. Julian Smith, MP – Member of Parliament for Skipton & Ripon and Secretary of State for Northern Ireland. Formerly Government Chief Whip. For political and public service.
- Nicholas Timothy – Former Joint Chief of Staff to the Prime Minister and Special Adviser to the Home Secretary. For political and public service.

=== Officer of the Order of the British Empire (OBE) ===
==== Civil division ====
- Kirsty Buchanan – Director of Communications, Ministry of Housing, Communities and Local Government and former Special Adviser to the Prime Minister. For political and public service.
- Victoria Busby – Lately Deputy Director for Events & Visits, 10 Downing Street. For public service.
- Keelan Carr – Lately Director of Research and Messaging, 10 Downing Street and Special Adviser to the Prime Minister. For political and public service.
- Alexander Dawson – Former Director of Research and Messaging, 10 Downing Street, Special Adviser to the Home Secretary and Director, Conservative Research Department. For political and public service.
- Philip Dumville – Agent to Maidenhead, Beaconsfield, and Chesham & Amersham Conservative Associations. For political and public service.
- Paul Harrison – Lately Press Secretary to the Prime Minister and former Special Adviser to the Secretary of State for Health. For political and public service.
- The Hon. Caroline Haughey, QC – Barrister, Furnival Chambers and Independent Reviewer of the Modern Slavery Act 2015. For public service.
- Seema Kennedy, MP – Member of Parliament for South Ribble and Parliamentary Under-Secretary of State, Home Office. Former Parliamentary Private Secretary to the Prime Minister. For political and public service.
- Matilda Macattram – Founder and Director, Black Mental Health UK. For services to mental health.
- James McLoughlin – Lately Special Adviser to the Prime Minister on business relations. For political and public service.
- Dr. Deborah Milligan – General Practitioner, Swallowfield Medical Practice and NHS Locality Lead, Wokingham. For services to public health.
- Raoul Ruparel – Lately Special Adviser to the Prime Minister and the Secretary of State for Exiting the European Union. For political and public service.
- William Vereker – Lately the Prime Minister's Business Envoy. For political and public service.

=== Member of the Order of the British Empire (MBE) ===
==== Civil division ====
- David Beckingham – Political Adviser, 10 Downing Street Political Office. For political and public service.
- Clare Brunton – Private Secretary to the Prime Minister and former Private Secretary to the Prime Minister's Chief of Staff and Principal Private Secretary. For public service.
- Eleanor Nicholson – Lately Deputy Director of the Cabinet Office Europe Unit Secretariat and former Private Secretary to the Home Secretary. For public service.
- Jennifer Sharkey – Executive Secretary to the Rt. Hon. Theresa May MP. For political and public service.

=== British Empire Medal (BEM) ===
- Graham Howarth. Head Chef to the Chequers Estate, Buckinghamshire. For public service.
- Debra Wheatley. Housekeeper, 10 Downing Street. For public service.
