= Sun Mark =

British marketing company

Sun Mark Ltd
- Formerly: Sun Oil Ltd
- Company type: Private
- Industry: Fast-moving consumer goods, Marketing & Distribution
- Founded: 1995
- Founder: Rami Ranger
- Headquarters: Sun House, 428 Long Drive, Greenford, Middlesex, UB6 8UH, UK
- Area served: Worldwide
- Key people: Rami Ranger (Chairman & Founder), Harmeet Ahuja (CEO) and Mohan Khurana (General Manager)
- Brands: Anmol, Bulldog Power, Comfi, English Breeze, Flower Garden, Gluco-Max, Golden Country, Laser, Pure Heaven, Robust, Royalty, Sabina, Sumo, Toilet Guard
- Website: www.sunmark.co.uk

Sun Mark (Sun Mark Limited) is a British company engaged in the marketing and distribution of fast-moving consumer goods. Founded in 1995, it is based in Greenford, London Borough of Ealing. It markets a range of own label products. The company has won several Queen's Awards for Enterprise in international trade.

== History ==
=== Origins and history ===
Sun Mark was founded in 1995 by Rami Ranger and operates from its head office in Greenford, Middlesex. Sun Mark, in partnership with its sister company Sea Air & Land Forwarding Ltd, was founded with the purpose to provide customers with an end to end service for marketing and distribution of fast-moving consumer goods products. Sun Mark focuses on approaching traditionally hard to reach markets around the world and provides both its own label and leading brands such as Heinz, Mondelez, Nestle and Unilever amongst others to certain territories worldwide. Sun Mark is also a leading member of the Landmark Wholesale group.

== Awards and recognition ==
The company was awarded the Queens Award for Enterprise in International Trade from 2009 to 2014 and became the only British company to be awarded consecutively for five years. In July 2014, Prime Minister David Cameron visited Sun Mark's headquarters in Greenford to award the 5th Queens Award for Enterprise in International Trade to the company. In 2013 the company was awarded by the Institute of Export in recognition of winning 5th consecutive Queens Award for Enterprise.

The Sunday Times fast track ranking
Year	Category	Rank	ref
2012	International Track	#102	
2012	Profit Track	#25	
2013	International Track	#162	
2013	Profit Track	#75	
2013	Top Track	#228	
