= A Manifesto for Labour Law =

Policy proposals on labour law reform

A Manifesto for Labour Law: towards a comprehensive revision of workers’ rights (Institute of Employment Rights, 2016) is a set of reform proposals for UK labour law, written by fifteen labour rights experts in academia and legal practice from the UK, Europe and the Commonwealth. It is edited by Keith D. Ewing, John Hendy QC and Carolyn Jones. The Manifesto urges that to stop low productivity, rising inequality, stagnant low wages, and poor working conditions, there should be a shift toward sectoral collective bargaining, worker voice in corporate governance, and a renewed Ministry of Labour with power to support democracy at work. In full, it lists 25 recommendations for reform.

== Contents ==
- Chapter one - introduction
- Chapter two - the four pillars of collective bargaining
- Chapter three - making collective bargaining work
- Chapter four - improving statutory protection
- Chapter five - making rights work
- Chapter six - securing freedom of association
- Chapter seven - enhancing the right to strike
- Chapter eight - conclusion
- Principal recommendations

== Significance ==
The ‘’Manifesto’’ has been reviewed in multiple blogs and journals, endorsed by trade unions, and adopted by the opposition Labour Party.

== See also ==
- United Kingdom labour law
- European labour law
- United States labor law
