= John Mann, Baron Mann =

British Labour Party Lord and former Labour MP (born 1960)

The Right Honourable The Lord Mann
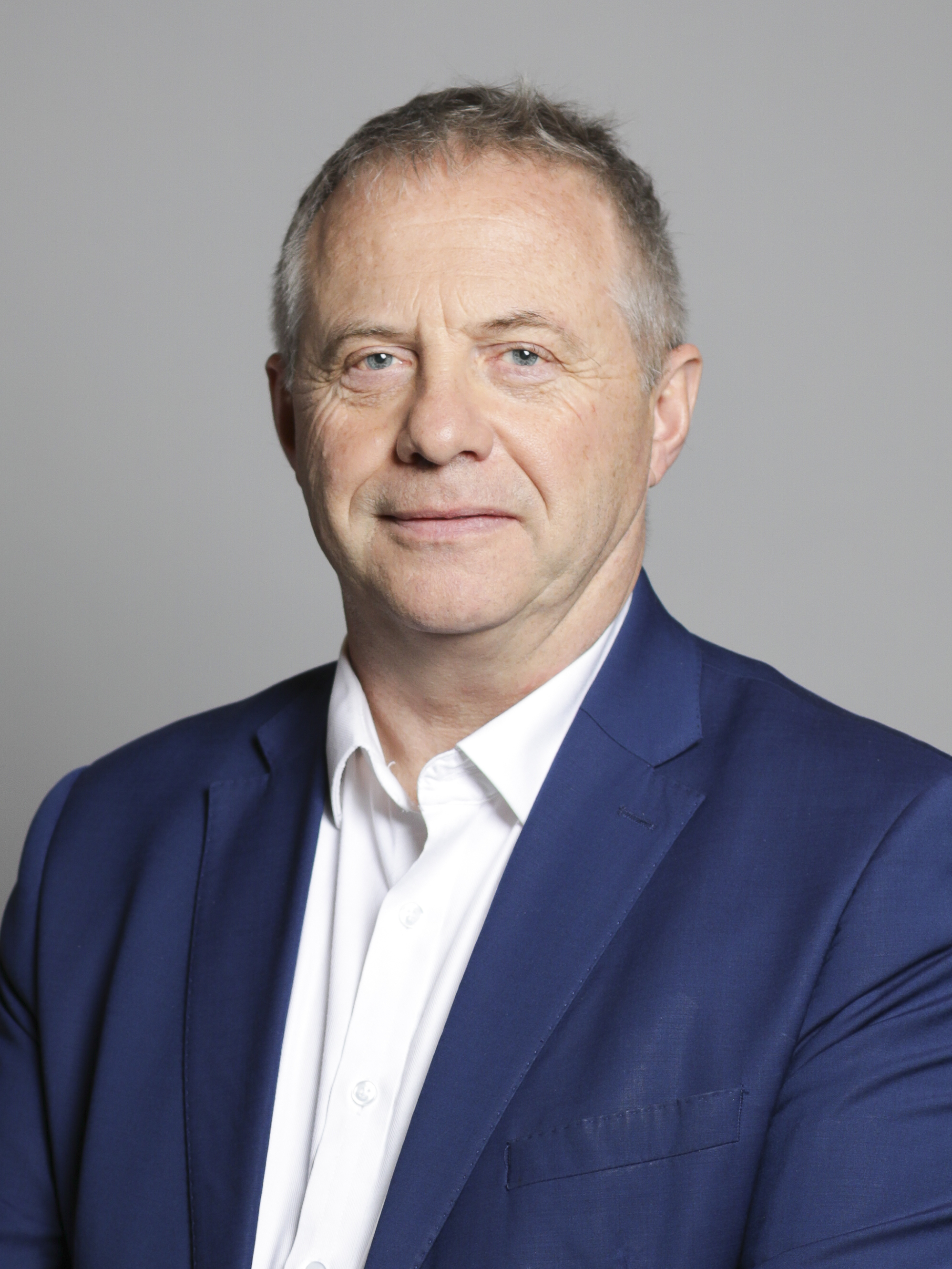
- Official portrait, 2019

UK Government Advisor on Antisemitism
- Incumbent
- Assumed office 28 October 2019
- Appointed by: Theresa May
- Prime Minister: Boris Johnson; Liz Truss; Rishi Sunak; Keir Starmer; Andy Burnham
- Preceded by: Office established

Chairman of the Treasury Select Committee
- Acting; 3 September 2019 – 13 September 2019
- Preceded by: Nicky Morgan
- Succeeded by: Catherine McKinnell (acting)

Member of the House of Lords
- Lord Temporal
- Life peerage 28 October 2019

Member of Parliament for Bassetlaw
- In office 7 June 2001 – 28 October 2019
- Preceded by: Joe Ashton
- Succeeded by: Brendan Clarke-Smith

Personal details
- Born: 10 January 1960 (age 66) Leeds, West Riding of Yorkshire, England
- Party: Parliamentary affiliation: Labour (2001–2019; since 2024); Non-affiliated (2019–2024); Party membership: Labour
- Spouse: Jo White
- Children: 3
- Education: University of Manchester

John Mann, Baron Mann (born 10 January 1960) is a British politician who is a Member of the House of Lords. Before being granted a peerage, he was the Labour Party Member of Parliament (MP) for Bassetlaw from the 2001 general election until 2019.

Mann served on the Treasury Select Committee. He had been the Parliamentary private secretary (PPS) to Tessa Jowell and Richard Caborn. Mann is also a prominent campaigner against antisemitism. In 2019, he stood down as an MP before the general election and took up a full-time role as the UK Government's independent adviser on antisemitism in the United Kingdom, at the Ministry of Housing, Communities and Local Government.

Mann was nominated as a life peer in the House of Lords by Prime Minister Theresa May in her resignation honours list. He resigned his Commons seat on 28 October. He retook the Labour whip in May 2024.

== Early life and career ==
Mann is the son of Brenda (née Cleavin) and James Mann. He attended Waterloo Infants school and Pudsey Waterloo Junior school in Pudsey, Yorkshire, then won a County Council scholarship to the private Bradford Grammar School. He holds a degree in Economics from the University of Manchester and a Diploma in Training Management.

Active in the Labour Party from his youth (Pudsey South Labour Party), he was formerly a councillor in the London Borough of Lambeth. He was chair of the National Organisation of Labour Students in 1983 and 1984. He subsequently co-authored a Fabian Society tract on the organisation of Labour's youth wing, which formed the basis of the later reorganisation of the youth wing by Tom Sawyer to reduce the influence of Militant tendency.

Before entering Parliament he worked for the Amalgamated Engineering and Electrical Union as Head of Research and Education and as the National Training Officer at the TUC National Education Centre in North London (now defunct). Mann was national trade union officer for the 1997 general election. He also was involved in running a family business organising international conferences, interpretation, translation, microphone hire and sound systems, alongside his trades union work.

== Parliamentary career ==
Mann sought and failed to be selected as Labour candidate in a by-election for the Yorkshire South constituency for the European Parliament in 1998, losing out to Linda McAvan who went on to win the by-election. Mann was first elected as MP for Bassetlaw at the 2001 general election after the previous MP Joe Ashton retired, and retained his seat at each subsequent election in which he stood.

Mann was the first Labour MP to call for Gordon Brown to resign following the 2010 general election. Mann was also vocal in criticising other MPs over the expenses scandal, arguing that they could not be trusted to self-regulate. He criticised the shredding of documents related to expenses before 2010, saying "it looks like MPs trying to protect MPs again". He was also responsible for lodging the complaint that resulted in an inquiry into Maria Miller's expense claims.

During the 2015 leadership campaign, he wrote an open letter to Jeremy Corbyn saying that it would be "inappropriate" for him to become Labour leader due to allegations that he had failed to act over allegations of child abuse in his constituency. Just over two months after Corbyn had won the leadership campaign, Mann continued to refuse to back him in an interview with the BBC, indicating he had no confidence in him. Instead, he said that he had confidence in the then shadow foreign secretary Hilary Benn. He supported Owen Smith in the failed attempt to replace Corbyn in the 2016 Labour leadership election.

Mann faced criticism for allegedly perpetuating racial stereotypes against Romani people and travellers in a booklet he produced on antisocial behaviour in 2007.

=== Drug policy ===
One of Mann's earliest campaigns in his constituency was his inquiry into heroin use in the area. In September 2002, Mann called for more treatment for heroin users in North Nottinghamshire. The inquiry he instigated called for heroin addicts to be given the choice between treatment or prison. At the same time more local GPs were trained to help heroin addicts get their lives back under control. Following the reforms the number of addicts in treatment in Bassetlaw rose from 2 to 400, and acquisitive crime fell by 75%.

Following a local newspaper story in October 2005, Mann raised an Early day motion calling for the psychoactive plant species, Salvia divinorum, to be banned in the UK (EDM796). The motion only received 11 signatures.

It was later reported that Mann had written to the Home Secretary in October 2008, urging her to take action with regard to salvia's legal status. The same report said that the Advisory Council on the Misuse of Drugs had met to discuss salvia, among other substances, in April 2009, and that there would be a follow-up meeting in May. The Observer newspaper gave the content of Mann's letter to Jacqui Smith. "Sadly the issue has come to light again as our young people are using the internet and sites like YouTube to broadcast their friends taking the drug and witnessing the hallucinogenic effects. Our young people are at risk and a wider cultural attachment to this drug seems to be developing that I am sure you agree – regardless of its legal status – needs nipping in the bud".

=== Local campaigns ===
Mann was an active campaigner in his constituency of Bassetlaw, and an advocate of using campaigning strategies he refers to as "organising to win" elsewhere. He has organised numerous campaigns in his constituency, examples of which include, during 2003 and 2004, campaigning to save Bassetlaw Hospital Accident and Emergency Department, helping former coal miners fight double charging solicitors to get their compensation back, and fighting Bassetlaw District Council's policy of "topple testing" headstones in local cemeteries. Mann kept a weekly column in the Worksop Guardian and – along with other local figures – wrote occasional pieces for the Retford Times.

=== Operation Midland ===
In December 2014, Mann gave a dossier, compiled by him and containing child sexual abuse allegations against 22 high-profile individuals, to the Metropolitan Police, which as part of Operation Midland was pursuing investigations into homicide and child abuse allegedly committed some decades previously at the Dolphin Square apartment building in Pimlico, London. Mann said that he had made a detailed examination of hundreds of pieces of evidence from members of the public and that he believed some of the twelve former UK government ministers named were "definitely child abusers". He said that evidence against half of those on the list was "very compelling" and that some could "definitely be prosecuted". Operation Midland was closed in 2016 when the allegations were found to be false.

=== Stance on antisemitism ===
Mann has described antisemitism as "the worst of racisms", and chaired the All-Party Parliamentary Group Against Antisemitism during 2004–2019. In May 2009, Mann received the American Jewish Committee's Jan Karski Award in recognition of his commitment to fighting antisemitism in all of its forms.

On 28 April 2016, Mann confronted Ken Livingstone in a public stairwell in front of a news camera crew, calling him a "Nazi apologist" and a "fucking disgrace" over Livingstone's remarks in a radio interview that Adolf Hitler, on coming to power, supported Zionism for the purpose of expelling Jewish people from Germany. Labour's chief whip, Rosie Winterton, told Mann it was "completely inappropriate for Labour members of Parliament to be involved in very public rows on the television".

Mann wrote in The Jewish Chronicle in early May 2016: "If Labour cannot combat racism then we are nothing – and racism always includes antisemitism. If we cannot do that now, then we have no reason to exist". In June 2017, he criticised Corbyn as "a man who claims he's dedicated his entire life to racism"(sic) but was "not prepared to make a speech exclusively, explicitly, just on antisemitism". In September 2019, upon his announcement that he was leaving the Commons, Mann said he would "never forgive" Corbyn, believing he had allowed the party to be "hijacked" by antisemitic bigots.

In July 2019, Prime Minister Theresa May appointed Mann as a government adviser on antisemitism. In September 2019, Mann announced that he was taking up a full-time role as the government's antisemitism adviser.

=== Brexit ===
Mann announced he would vote to leave the European Union in the June 2016 referendum, saying he believed Labour voters "fundamentally disagree" with Labour's official stance. His own constituency voted to leave by a margin of 68% to 32%.

Mann was one of only three Labour MPs, along with Ian Austin and Kevin Barron, to defy a three-line whip and to vote for Theresa May's Brexit deal in 15 January 2019 Meaningful vote. On 29 January 2019, Mann was one of seven Labour MPs to vote with the Conservative Government supporting Graham Brady's amendment mandating Theresa May to renegotiate the Irish backstop in the Withdrawal Agreement. The other six MPs were Austin, Barron, Jim Fitzpatrick, Roger Godsiff, Kate Hoey and Graham Stringer.

On 3 April 2019, Mann was one of twelve Labour and ex-Labour MPs to vote alongside the Conservatives against the Cooper Bill, which had been supported by the Labour Party. Nonetheless, the bill passed the House of Commons with a difference of one vote. On 3 September 2019, Mann and Hoey were the only Labour MPs to vote with the Government in an attempt to prevent MPs from taking control of the house to block a potential no-deal Brexit, saying "I didn't vote with the government. I voted against an amendment that is deliberately calculated to block Brexit".

== House of Lords ==
On 7 September 2019, Mann announced that he would not stand as an MP at the next general election to take up a full-time role as the government's antisemitism adviser, citing his belief that Corbyn was unfit to become Prime Minister for his mishandling of allegations of antisemitism within the Labour Party. Two days later, it was reported in The Times that Theresa May's resignation honours list was held up by a row over her decision to give Mann a life peerage and that the independent watchdog on Lords appointments warned it would set a dangerous precedent and could be seen as a bribe for his support of her Brexit withdrawal bill. He was created Baron Mann, of Holbeck Moor in the City of Leeds, on 28 October 2019, and was introduced to the House of Lords the next day.

== Personal life ==
Mann married Jo White in July 1986 in Leeds. White was a Labour councillor and was deputy leader of Bassetlaw District Council, and was employed by her husband as a part-time office manager, remunerated through his parliamentary expenses. The couple have two adult daughters and a son. White was selected as Labour's parliamentary candidate for Bassetlaw in August 2022 and was elected in the 2024 general election.

Mann supports Leeds United.

== See also ==
- List of combating antisemitism envoys

Parliament of the United Kingdom
Preceded by Joe Ashton	Member of Parliament for Bassetlaw; 2001–2019	Succeeded by Brendan Clarke-Smith
Orders of precedence in the United Kingdom
Preceded by The Lord Hendy	Gentlemen; Baron Mann	Followed by The Lord Carter of Haslemere
