= Ruth Hunt, Baroness Hunt of Bethnal Green =

Welsh administrator and former Chief Executive of Stonewall

The Right Honourable The Baroness Hunt of Bethnal Green
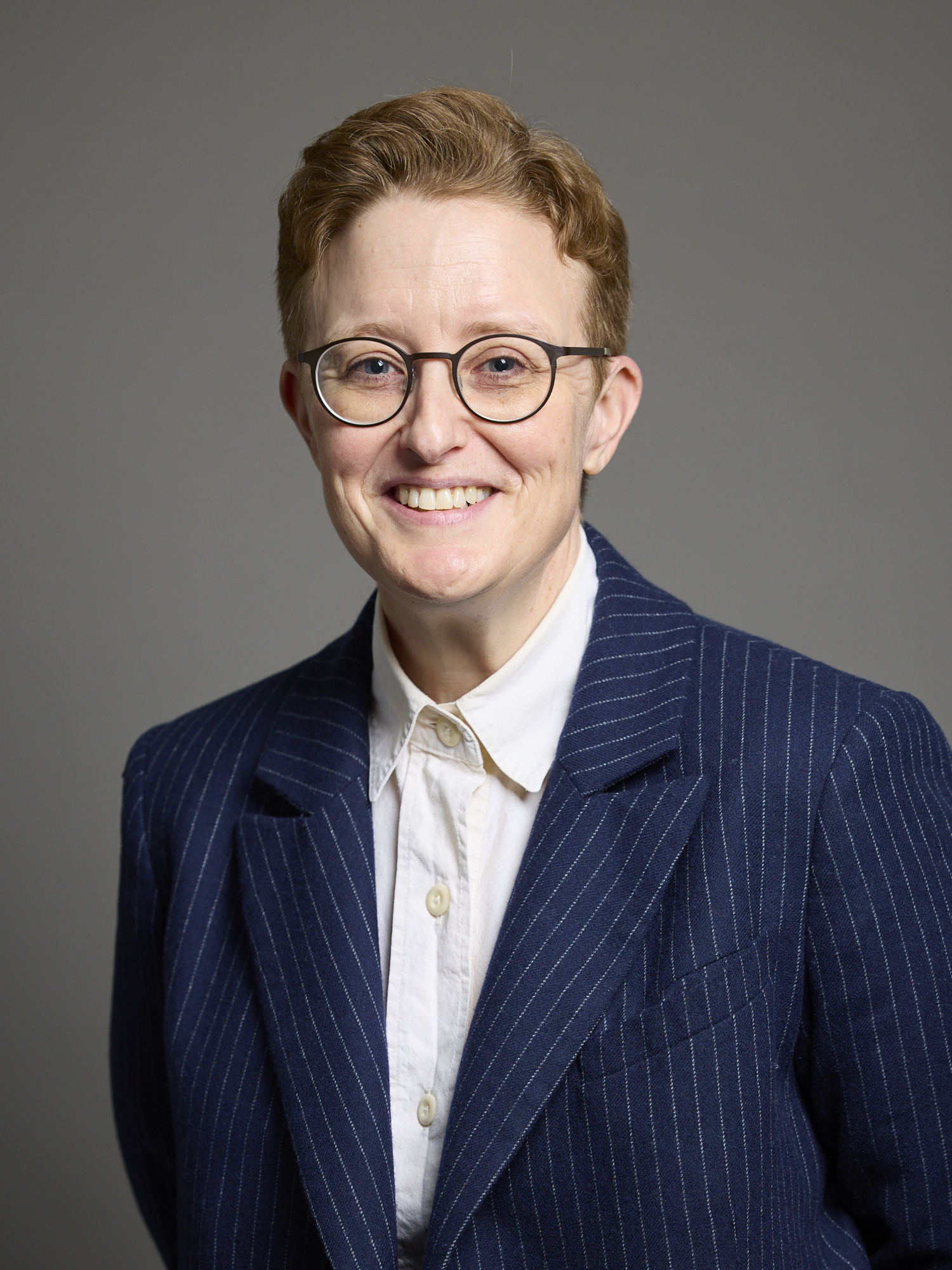
- Hunt in 2025

Member of the House of Lords
- Lord Temporal
- Life peerage 16 October 2019

Personal details
- Born: Ruth Elizabeth Hunt; 12 March 1980 (age 46) Cardiff, Wales
- Party: None (crossbencher)
- Domestic partner: Caroline Ellis
- Education: St Hilda's College, Oxford
- Occupation: Former Chief Executive of Stonewall

Ruth Elizabeth Hunt, Baroness Hunt of Bethnal Green (born 12 March 1980) is a Welsh administrator who was Chief Executive of UK-based lesbian, gay, bisexual and trans equality charity Stonewall, the largest LGBTQ equality body in Europe, from 2014 until her resignation in 2019.

Hunt was nominated for a life peerage and Crossbench member of the House of Lords in the 2019 Prime Minister's Resignation Honours. She was created Baroness Hunt of Bethnal Green, of Bethnal Green in the London Borough of Tower Hamlets, on 16 October 2019.

She was formerly President of the Oxford University Student Union.

== Biography ==
Hunt was educated at Christ the King Primary School, Cardiff, New College, Cardiff, a former independent school, and King Edward VI Camp Hill School for Girls, a Grammar School in Birmingham, before going on to study English Language and Literature at St Hilda's College, Oxford.

Hunt joined the Equality Challenge Unit, an organisation which promoted "equality for staff employed in the higher education sector", in January 2004, where she led work to advise higher education institutions on sexual orientation and gender identity equality.

In 2005, she joined Stonewall in the role of Senior Policy Officer, where she led work on Stonewall's research into homophobic bullying in schools. She became Head of Policy and Research in 2007 and Director of Public Affairs in 2009.

During this time Hunt produced research into lesbian, gay and bisexual health needs and inequalities, religion and belief and its impact on sexual orientation equality, older gay people's experiences in Britain and, in 2012, the first guide looking at openly gay role models.

In 2013, Hunt was named as Deputy Chief Executive of Stonewall, overseeing the strategic development and delivery of Stonewall's policy, research, campaigns and information functions which includes the work of Stonewall's Public Affairs team, Education team, the Stonewall Information Service and Stonewall Scotland and Stonewall Cymru.

In July 2014, after a period as Acting Chief Executive, she was named Chief Executive of Stonewall.

Hunt has overseen the growth of Stonewall's work in Scotland and Wales, in particular the establishment of the Stonewall Cymru bilingual information service and Stonewall Scotland's lobbying to secure the Marriage and Civil Partnership (Scotland) Bill. She gave evidence to the Scottish Parliament Equal Opportunities Committee on marriage equality in September 2013.

Hunt has led Stonewall's work on policy development and strategic influencing, in particular developing strategic partnerships with organisations across the public and private sector. She has led work with organisations such as the Ministry of Defence, the UK Border Agency, the Home Office and Accenture.

As Deputy Chief Executive, Hunt was involved in Stonewall's campaign on the Marriage (Same Sex Couples) Bill in England and Wales.

She was involved in Stonewall's campaign on the Human Fertilisation and Embryology Act 2008, legalising lesbian access to fertility treatment.

In 2015, in its "Rainbow List", the Independent on Sunday named Hunt as the third most influential LGBT person in Britain. In 2015, she also received an honorary fellowship from Cardiff University, where her mother Sheila was then Professor of Nursing, and an honorary degree from Keele University.

Hunt also holds an honorary doctorate with Exeter University and is a visiting fellow at Jesus College Cambridge.

In May 2014 she announced in The Daily Telegraph that Stonewall would not be joining a wide boycott of The Dorchester hotel in London, owned by the Sultan of Brunei, Hassanal Bolkiah, where Stonewall was to hold a gala dinner. Bolkiah was proposing to introduce the death penalty for sodomy but she argued that there was not "a mandate for the boycott" and "We only implement actions that we can calculate will have an impact."

She publicly apologised days before the 2015 general election after Stonewall was criticised for publishing an online campaign graphic which suggested that only the Labour Party substantially supported LGBT equality in its manifesto.

In 2019, some donors were reported by The Sunday Times to have stopped funding Stonewall as a consequence of Hunt's position on trans equality. One donor was reported as saying that Hunt was "no longer a worthy champion of our rights", another that she had "lost what the big principle is".

Hunt edited The Book of Queer Prophets, a collection of essays on sexuality and religion published in May 2020. The book includes essays by Jeanette Winterson, Phyll Opoku-Gyimah, John L. Bell, and others. The book was dedicated to "the countless queer people who continue to find the courage to speak truth to power ... We are channels of peace and we bring so much love to the world.

In a July 2022 interview with The Tablet - speaking about "her Catholic faith and her values" - Hunt explained that she was "a regular attender at the Wednesday evening Catholic Masses held in the Houses of Parliament". She said: “I try not to scrutinise too closely the political machinations of the Church because I find it too intrusive on my peace and my relationship with God. The most peaceful way I have that relationship is through Catholic Mass. I’ve been brought up with Catholic values. When I go to other shop fronts [other Christian churches’ services], I don’t experience that peace.” She also noted: "The Vatican has more gay staff than most corporates."

In April 2024, anti-trans campaigners started a change.org petition calling for the former chief executive of Stonewall to be expelled from the House of Lords following the Cass Review.

== Personal life ==
Hunt entered a civil partnership with Kirsty Lloyd in 2010.

Hunt works with her current partner, Caroline Ellis, as cofounders of Deeds and Words. Hunt and Ellis live together in London in a civil partnership.

Hunt is said to be Roman Catholic, but worships at an Anglican Church where she is a member of the Parochial Church Council.

Orders of precedence in the United Kingdom
Preceded by The Baroness Blower	Ladies; Baroness Hunt of Bethnal Green	Followed by The Baroness Ritchie of Downpatrick
