= Conservative Friends of India =

UK political campaign group

The Conservative Friends of India is linked to the Conservative Party in the UK, and is a membership organisation which engages with the British Indian community and played a significant role in the Conservative campaign in the 2019 general election, as well as supporting the development of stronger India–United Kingdom relations. It actively campaigns for the Conservative Party in the British Indian community. The organisation was also responsible for releasing Hindi campaign songs for the Conservative Party in recent elections supporting David Cameron, Theresa May and Zac Goldsmith.

The organisation's events have been attended by the High Commissioner of India to the United Kingdom.

== Board ==
=== Co-chairmen ===
- Rt. Hon Sir Oliver Dowden KCB CBE MP
- Dr Koolesh Shah
- Director Resham Kotecha

== Patrons ==
- Theresa May MP
- Iain Duncan Smith MP
- Nus Ghani MP
- Alok Sharma MP
- Tom Tugendhat MP
- Shailesh Vara MP
