= Elizabeth Sanderson, Baroness Sanderson of Welton =

The Right Honourable The Baroness Sanderson of Welton
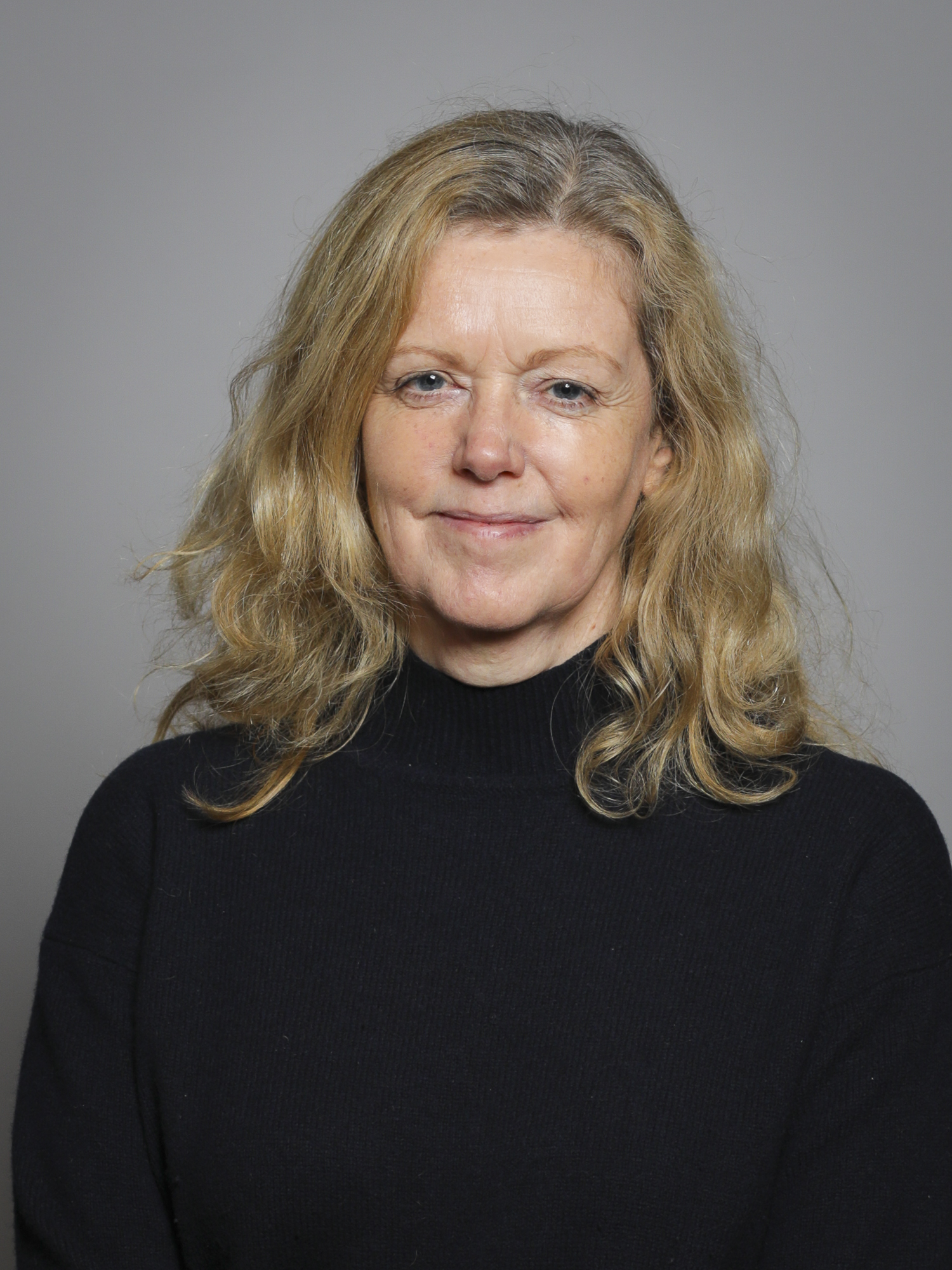

Member of the House of Lords
- Lord Temporal
- Life peerage 8 October 2019

Personal details
- Born: Elizabeth Jenny Rosemary Sanderson; 24 May 1971 (age 55) Yorkshire, England
- Party: Conservative
- Spouse: James Franklin (m. 2005)

Elizabeth Sanderson, Baroness Sanderson of Welton (born 24 May 1971), is a British political advisor and member of the House of Lords since 2019.

== Life ==
Born in 1971 in the East Riding of Yorkshire, a cousin of the Sanderson baronets, Liz Sanderson pursued a career in journalism with the Mail on Sunday where she worked for 17 years, before being appointed a Special Adviser and Head of Features to Theresa May (as Home Secretary then Prime Minister) from 2014 to 2019.

Nominated as a Life Peer in the 2019 Prime Minister's Resignation Honours, she was created Baroness Sanderson of Welton, of Welton in the East Riding of Yorkshire on 8 October 2019, and then introduced to the House of Lords on 22 October 2019, sitting on the Conservative benches. Lady Sanderson made her maiden speech on 31 October 2019 during a Lords debate on the Grenfell Tower Inquiry (Phase 1 report).

In September 2022, HMG appointed Lady Sanderson to chair an advisory panel for developing a new strategy for public libraries.

== See also ==
- Sanderson baronets
