= Franck Petitgas, Baron Petitgas =

French-British banker and politician (born 1961)

The Right Honourable The Lord Petitgas
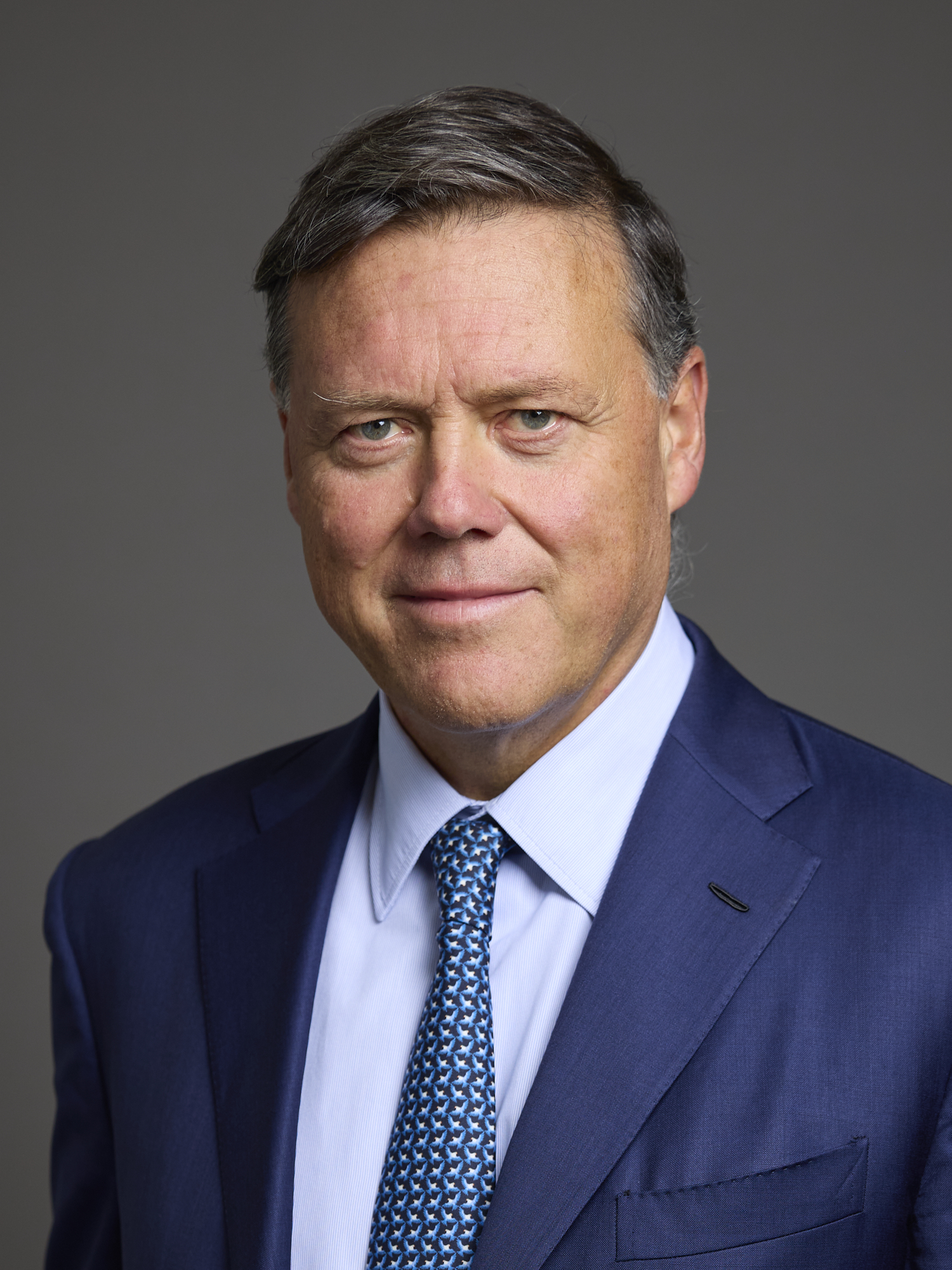
- Official portrait, 2024

Member of the House of Lords
- Lord Temporal
- Life peerage 7 March 2024

Personal details
- Born: Franck Robert Marie Petitgas; 25 February 1961 (age 65) Nantes, France
- Party: Conservative
- Education: ESCP Business School
- Occupation: Banker

Franck Robert Marie Petitgas, Baron Petitgas (born 25 February 1961) is a French banker based in the United Kingdom. Lord Petitgas is the Vice Chairman of Blackstone Europe. Formerly head of international at Morgan Stanley, he was a special adviser on business and investment to former British prime minister Rishi Sunak, and has been a member of the House of Lords since 2024.

== Early life and education ==
Petitgas was born on 25 February 1961 in Nantes, France, to Victor and Denise Petitgas. He was educated at ESCP Business School in Paris.

== Career ==
Petitgas worked at S. G. Warburg & Co. from 1986 before joining the investment bank Morgan Stanley in 1993. He was appointed a co-head of European banking in 2005, and became the firm's head of investment banking in 2007 and head of international in 2018. Petitgas retired from Morgan Stanley in November 2022, but stayed on a senior adviser to the company.

Petitgas served as a member of the board of trustees of Tate from 2008 to 2016, and was the chairman of the Tate Foundation from 2011 to 2021. He is a collector of contemporary Latin American art.

In April 2023, British prime minister Rishi Sunak appointed Petitgas a special adviser on business and investment while Sunak sought to increase business investment and deliver on the government's economic pledges. Petitgas has donated £35,000 to the Conservative Party as of 2024.

With his wife Amanda, Petitgas owns the historic manor of Bosham in West Sussex, comprising 2,230 acres (900 ha) of Chichester Harbour and its moorings.

== Honours ==
Petitgas was appointed a knight (chevalier) of the Legion of Honour in France's 2012 New Year honours. Nominated by Sunak for a life peerage, he was created Baron Petitgas, of Bosham in the County of West Sussex, on 7 March 2024. He sits on the Conservative benches in the House of Lords.

== Personal life ==
Petitgas was formerly married to Catherine Petitgas (née Gex), a fellow French banker and art collector. They married in 1985 and have a son.

Orders of precedence in the United Kingdom
Preceded by The Lord Shamash	Gentlemen; Baron Petitgas	Followed by The Lord Booth
