= Honours Forfeiture Committee =

UK government committee

- Type: UK Cabinet Office sub-committee
- Legal status: ad hoc

The Honours Forfeiture Committee is an ad hoc committee convened under the United Kingdom Cabinet Office, which considers cases referred to the prime minister of the United Kingdom where an individual's actions subsequent to their being awarded a British honour raises the question of whether they should be allowed to continue to be a holder. Recommendations are made to the Monarch of the United Kingdom, who has the sole authority to rescind an honour.

== Operations ==
The committee is only convened at the request of the Prime Minister.

The committee conducts its business by correspondence, and only meets to confer about a decision where the probability is to rescind an honour. The committee only considers cases where an individual who has been honoured is judged to have brought the honours system into disrepute, including issues covering someone who:

- has been found guilty by the courts of a criminal offence and sentenced to a term of imprisonment of three months or more
- has been censured, struck off, etc. by the relevant professional or other regulatory authority for action or inaction which was directly relevant to the granting of the honours.

If there is other compelling evidence that an individual has brought the honours system into disrepute, then it is open to the committee to consider such cases as well. The committee also considers matters of general policy regarding forfeiture.

In 2009, Gordon Brown confirmed that the process remains as set out in 1994 by the then Prime Minister John Major in a written answer to the House of Commons:

The statutes of most orders of knighthood and the royal warrants of decorations and medals include provision for the Queen to "cancel and annul" appointments and awards. Cancellation is considered in cases where retention of the appointment or award would bring the honours system into disrepute. There are no set guidelines for cancellations, which are considered on a case-by-case basis. Since 1979, the London Gazette has published details of cancellations of 15 appointments and awards—three knighthoods, one CBE, five OBEs, four MBEs and two BEMs.

— John Major, House of Commons Hansard, 2 December 1994, vol 250 c923W

All decisions made by the committee are submitted to the Monarch through the Office of the Prime Minister. The subjects discussed by the Committee remain confidential at all times, until confirmed by the Monarch.

Decisions on forfeiture are published in the London Gazette.

== Composition ==
The Forfeiture Committee has a majority of independent members. It is chaired by Dame Sarah Healey (previous chairs include Sir Chris Wormald and Sir Jonathan Stephens), on delegated authority from the Cabinet Secretary. The other members are the Treasury solicitor and four independent members.

As of November 2025 its membership is as follows:

- Dame Sarah Healey: July 2025 – present (Chair)
- Susanna McGibbon: March 2021 – present
- Sir Hamid Patel: October 2022 – present (Independent)
- John Booth: October 2022 – present (Independent)
- Stephen Kelly: October 2022 – present (Independent)
- Dame Jane Dacre: October 2022 – present (Independent)

== Notable honours recommended for revocation by the committee ==
- Roger Casement: Knighthood and CMG, August 1916
- Vidkun Quisling: CBE, 1940
- Anthony Blunt: Knighthood (KCVO), 1979
- Lester Piggott: OBE, 1987
- Jack Lyons: Knighthood and CBE, 1991
- Naseem Hamed: MBE, 2007
- Fred Goodwin: Knighthood, January 2012
- Rolf Harris: CBE, 2015
- Hubert Chesshyre: CVO, 2018
- Harvey Weinstein: CBE, 2020
- Paula Vennells: CBE, 2024
- Richard Cowie (AKA ‘Wiley’): MBE, 2024

== Voluntary renouncing of honours ==
An individual can renounce their honour, by returning their insignia to Buckingham Palace and by ceasing to make any reference to having that honour, including ceasing using the honour post-nominals. However, only the monarch can annul an honour, and the individual would still hold the honour unless and until annulled by the monarch.

== See also ==
- Honours Committee
- Cash-for-Honours scandal
