= Peter Booth, Baron Booth =

British businessman and politician

The Right Honourable The Lord Booth
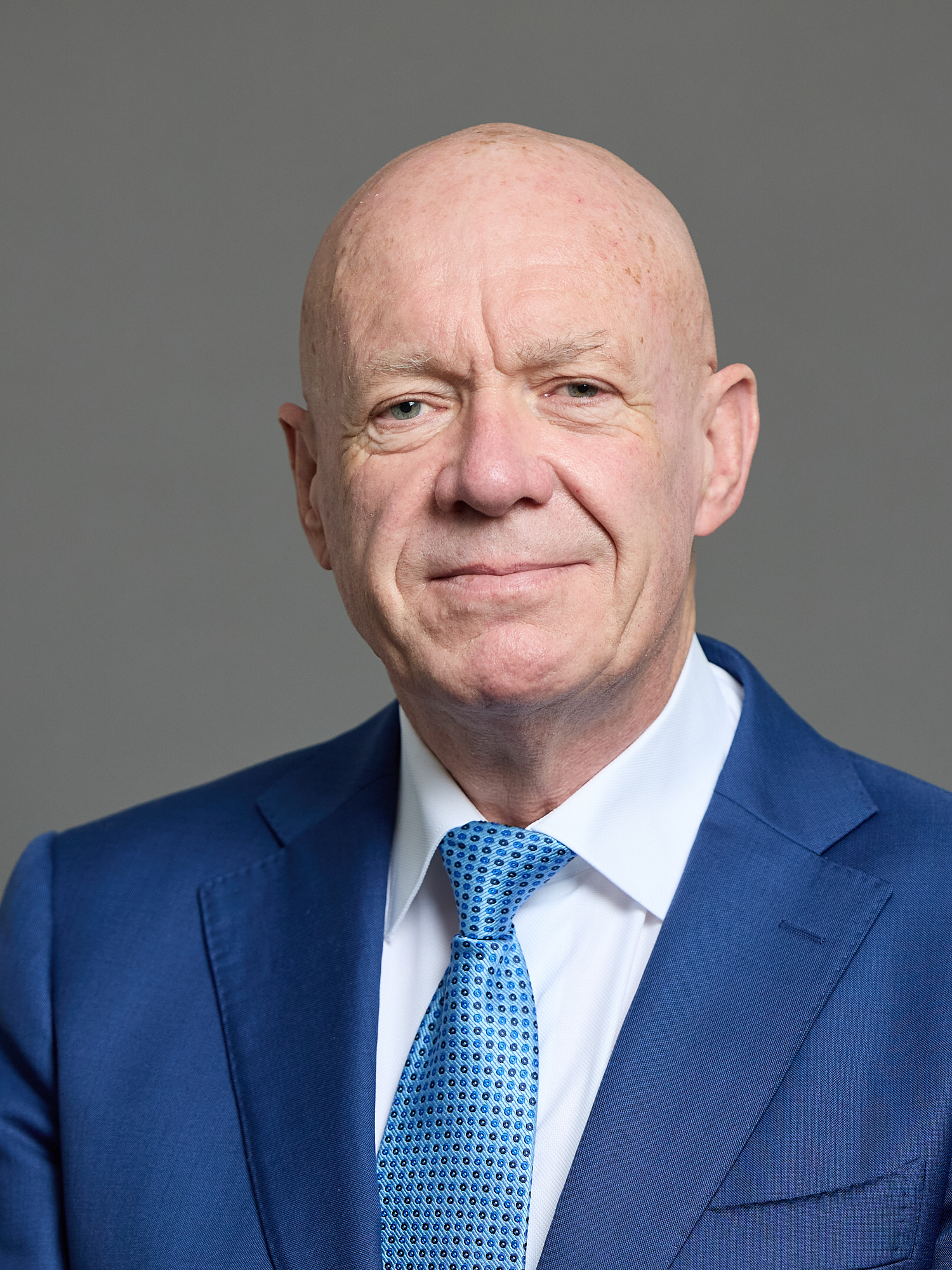
- Official portrait, 2025

Member of the House of Lords
- Lord Temporal
- Life peerage 7 March 2024

Personal details
- Born: Sydney John Peter Booth; August 1955 (age 71) Houghton-le-Spring, England
- Party: Conservative
- Spouse: Kelvin Poplett-Booth
- Education: University of Essex
- Occupation: Businessman

Sydney John Peter Booth, Baron Booth is a British businessman and politician.

== Early life ==
Booth was born in Houghton-le-Spring in the northeast of England, and lived there until attending the University of Essex where he took a bachelor's degree in government.

== Career ==
He has been a volunteer for the Conservative Party all of his adult life, having first being chairman of his university Conservative Association. He has served as a constituency chairman twice - once when living in Brighton and then in Cornwall. He was Regional Chairman of South West Conservatives before serving nationally. He served on the Conservative Party Board from 2019 to 2024. He served as the Chairman of the National Conservative Convention from July 2021 to September 2024, and was Deputy Chairman of the Conservative Party Board, and Chairman of the Conservative Party Finance and Audit Committee.

Booth was nominated by Prime Minister Rishi Sunak for a life peerage and was created Baron Booth, of Houghton-le-Spring in the City of Sunderland, on 7 March 2024.

== Personal life ==
He lives in Brighton with his husband.

Orders of precedence in the United Kingdom
| Preceded by The Lord Petitgas | Gentlemen; Baron Booth | Followed by The Lord Fuller |
