= Harold Carter, Baron Carter of Haslemere =

British lawyer and life peer

The Right Honourable The Lord Carter of Haslemere CB
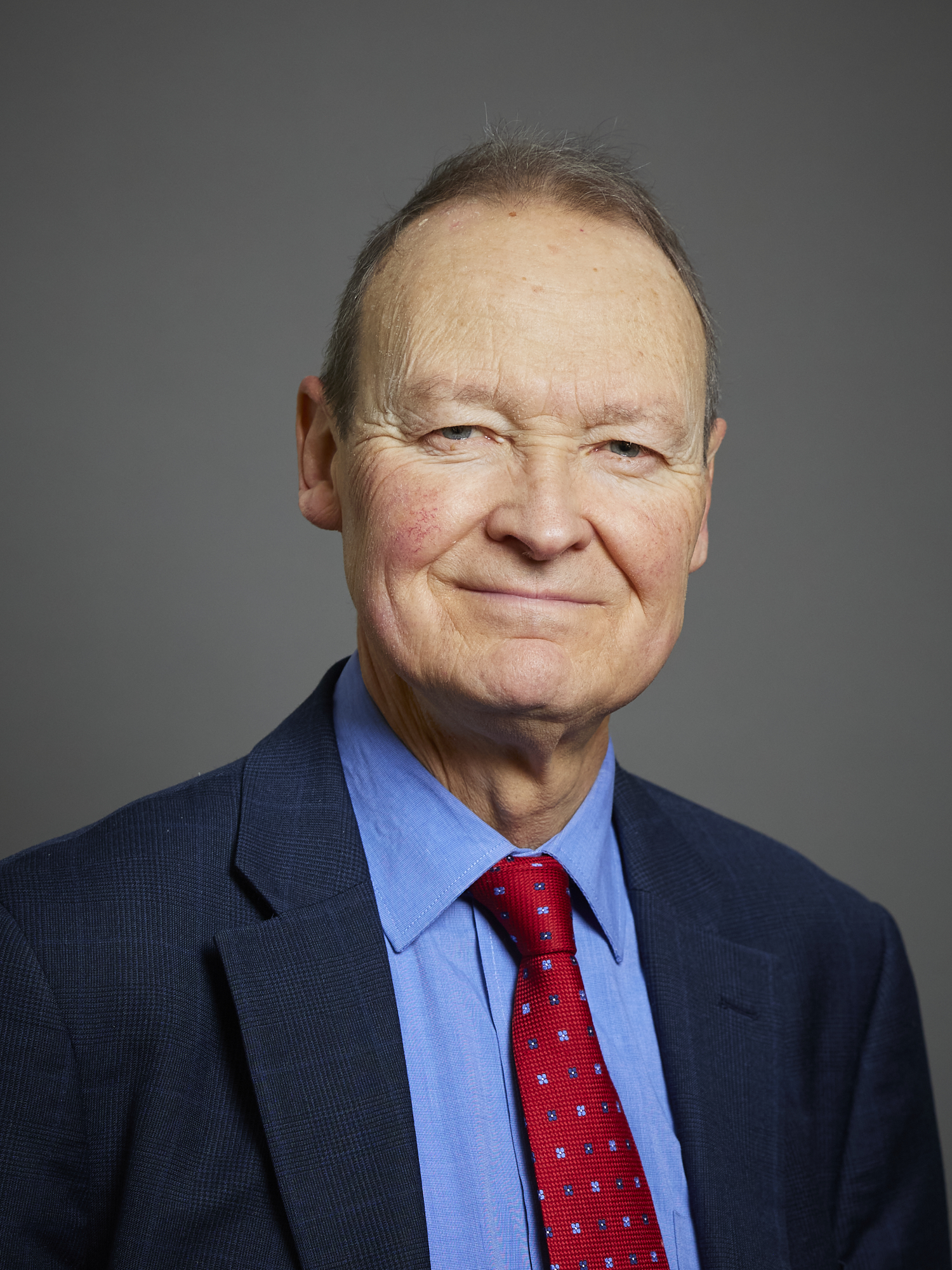

Member of the House of Lords
- Lord Temporal
- Life peerage 30 October 2019

Personal details
- Party: None (crossbencher)
- Education: University of Reading

Harold Mark Carter, Baron Carter of Haslemere, CB is a British lawyer, life peer and crossbench member of the House of Lords.

== Career ==
Carter studied law at the University of Reading, graduating with a Bachelor of Laws (LLB) degree. He worked at the Home Office from 1989 to 2006, and then the Foreign and Commonwealth Office from 2006 to 2009. He returned to the Home Office as deputy legal advisor in 2009. He has served as general counsel of 10 Downing Street since 2016. He is a bencher at Gray's Inn.

He was appointed Companion of the Order of the Bath (CB) in the 2015 New Year Honours for services to Government Legal Services and services to community in Guildford, Surrey.

=== House of Lords ===
In 2019, he was nominated for a life peerage in the Prime Minister's Resignation Honours and was created Baron Carter of Haslemere, of Haslemere in the County of Surrey, on 30 October. He was one of 11 peers who had not yet taken an oath to King Charles III by September 2023: peers are required to swear or affirm the oath of allegiance to the new monarch and cannot sit or vote in the House of Lords until they have done so. He stated that he refrained from involvement in the Lords "to avoid any conflict of interest whilst working as a crown [civil] servant".

Carter was introduced to the House of Lords on 4 December 2023. He made his maiden speech on 18 December 2023.

Orders of precedence in the United Kingdom
Preceded by The Lord Mann	Gentlemen; Baron Carter of Haslemere	Followed by The Lord Darroch of Kew
