= John Hendy, Baron Hendy =

British lawyer (born 1948)

The Right Honourable The Lord Hendy KC
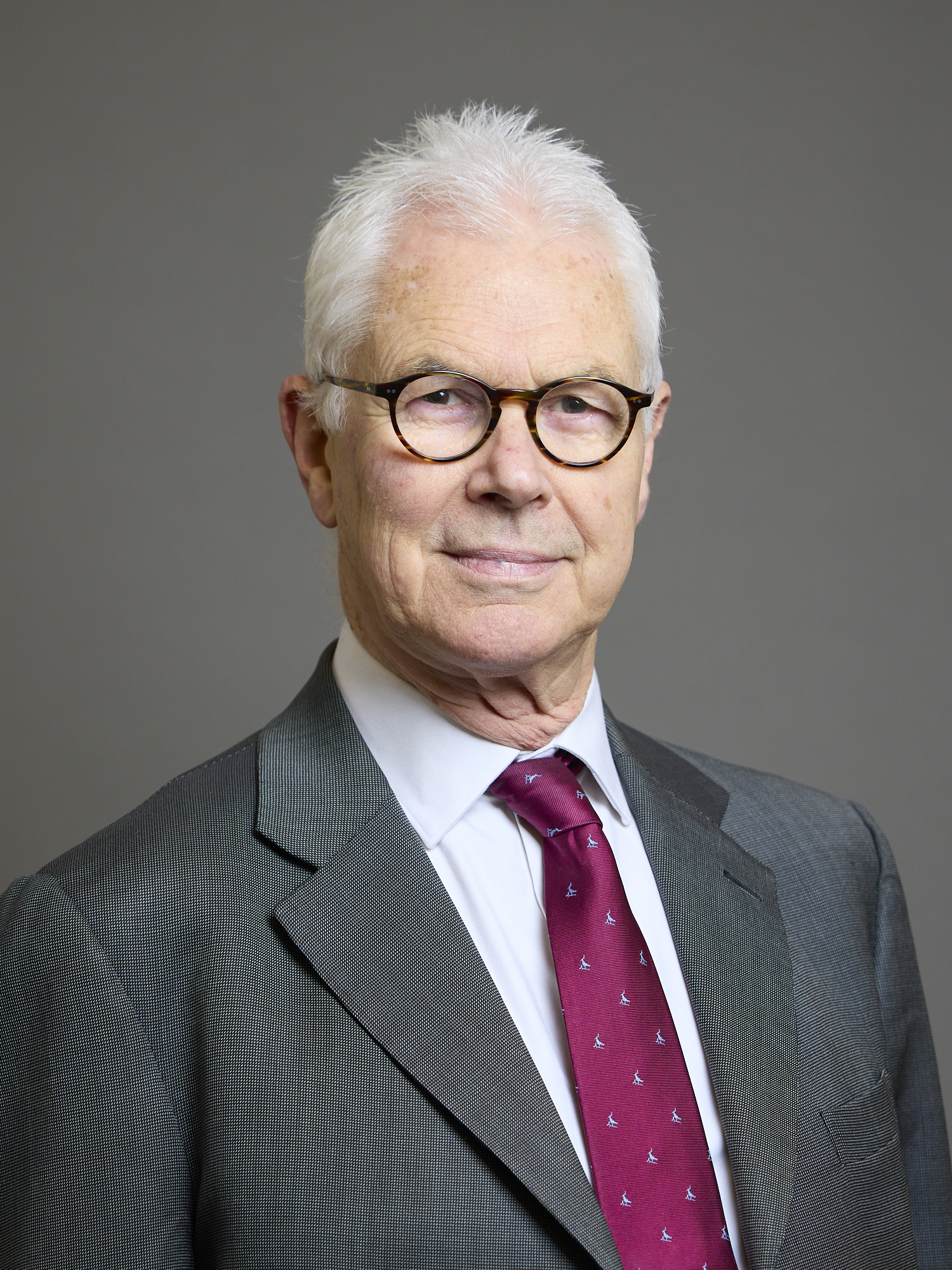
- Official portrait, 2024

Member of the House of Lords
- Lord Temporal
- Life peerage 15 October 2019

Personal details
- Born: John Giles Hendy; 11 April 1948 (age 78)
- Party: Labour
- Occupation: Barrister

John Giles Hendy, Baron Hendy, KC (born 11 April 1948), is an English barrister practising in employment and trade union law, and a member of the House of Lords.

== Early life ==
Hendy was educated at Mellow Lane Comprehensive in Hayes and Walpole Grammar in Ealing, both in West London, taking an external London LLB at Ealing Technical College, now the University of West London. He took an LLM at Queen's University, Belfast.

Lord Hendy's maternal grandfather was a hereditary peer, the 6th Baron Wynford, whose youngest daughter, the Hon. Jemima Best married Jack Hendy, "a communist electrician and trade unionist". He describes his father as "a great fighter for human dignity as a trade unionist" and as being the greatest influence on his life. His younger brother Lord Peter Hendy of Richmond Hill, former Commissioner of Transport for London, former chairman of Network Rail, and current Minister of State for Rail in the Department for Transport, is also a Labour life peer.

== Legal career ==
Once qualified as a barrister, Hendy established a law centre, the Newham Rights Centre in East London, and worked there full-time for three years. He then lectured for a year at Middlesex Polytechnic, before returning to the Bar in 1977 to focus on personal injury and industrial relations cases.

In the mid-1980s, he successfully represented Wendy Savage, a consultant obstetrician and gynecologist who was suspended from practice for alleged incompetence. The case led to Hendy taking others in the area of medical negligence, discipline and ethics.

In 1984–86, he represented the National Union of Mineworkers in the civil litigation arising out of the Miners' Strike. He took silk in 1987. In 1991, Hendy was one of four QCs, along with Michael Mansfield, Geoffrey Robertson and Kevin Garnett, acting for the National Union of Mineworkers against claims that it had handled funds inappropriately during the miners' strike of 1984–85. In 1992 he represented mining unions in the High Court against attempts to close 31 coal mines.

In 1995, he acted for National Union of Journalists (NUJ) member Dave Wilson in the Wilson and Palmer v United Kingdom in the European Court of Human Rights on discrimination against trade unionists.

In April 1999, Hendy became head of Old Square Chambers, in succession to John Melville Williams. By that year, judgments in 76 of his cases had been published in law reports.

Hendy also represented the relatives of the victims of the Southall, Ladbroke Grove, and Potters Bar rail crashes and the Lakanal House fire Inquest.

Hendy retired as head of Old Square Chambers in 2009. In 2011, The Lawyer described him as the "barrister champion of the trade union movement", noting that he often assists Unite, ASLEF and the National Union of Rail, Maritime and Transport Workers. He was Standing counsel to 7 trade unions.

In 2011 Hendy joined UCL Faculty of Laws as Honorary Professor of Labour Law.

He represented the NUJ at the Leveson Inquiry and questioned Rupert Murdoch directly on 27 March 2012.

== House of Lords ==
Nominated for a life peerage by Jeremy Corbyn in the 2019 Prime Minister's Resignation Honours, he was created Baron Hendy, of Hayes and Harlington in the London Borough of Hillingdon, on 15 October 2019. Lord Hendy sits as a Labour peer in the House of Lords, and made his maiden speech on 31 October 2019 during the Lords consideration of the Phase 1 Report of the Grenfell Tower Inquiry.

== See also ==
- A Manifesto for Labour Law (2016)

== Notes ==
Orders of precedence in the United Kingdom
| Preceded by The Lord Ranger | Gentlemen; Baron Hendy | Followed by The Lord Mann |
