= Blessington (disambiguation) =

Blessington is a town located in County Wicklow, Ireland. Blessington may also refer to:

- Blessington (Parliament of Ireland constituency), a constituency in County Wicklow represented in the Irish House of Commons from 1670 until 1800
- Blessington GAA, Gaelic games club in Blessington, County Wicklow
- Earl of Blessington, two extinct titles in Ireland
  - William Stewart, 1st Earl of Blessington (1709–1769), an Anglo-Irish peer and member of the House of Lords
  - Charles Gardiner, 1st Earl of Blessington (1782–1829), an Irish earl
  - Marguerite Gardiner, Countess of Blessington (1789–1849), an Irish novelist and wife of the earl
- James Blessington (1874-1939), a Scottish football player and manager
- Viscount Blesington, a title in the Peerage of Ireland
  - Murrough Boyle, 1st Viscount Blesington (1648–1718)
  - Charles Boyle, 2nd Viscount Blesington (d. 1732)
- Blessington, Ontario, a community in the township of Tyendinaga, Ontario
- Blessington, Tasmania, a locality in Australia
- Blessington Lake, a reservoir and conservation area in west County Wicklow, Ireland
  - Dublin and Blessington Steam Tramway, a steam-powered tram that ran from 1888 until 1932
