= List of viscountcies in the peerages of Britain and Ireland =

Peerages and baronetcies of Britain and Ireland
Extant	All
Dukes	Dukedoms
Marquesses	Marquessates
Earls	Earldoms
Viscounts	Viscountcies
Barons	Baronies
Baronets	Baronetcies

This article is a list of viscountcies in the peerages of Britain and Ireland, including England, Scotland, Ireland, Great Britain and the Peerage of the United Kingdom, listed in order of creation, including extant, extinct and abeyant titles. A viscount is the fourth rank in the peerage of the United Kingdom, Great Britain, England, Scotland and Ireland. A relatively late introduction, holders of the title take precedence after earls and before barons. (Note: On the evening of the Coronation of Queen Victoria in 1838, the Prime Minister Lord Melbourne explained to her why (from her journals): "I spoke to Ld M. about the numbers of Peers present at the Coronation, & he said it was quite unprecedented. I observed that there were very few Viscounts, to which he replied "There are very few Viscounts," that they were an old sort of title & not really English; that they came from Vice-Comites; that Dukes & Barons were the only real English titles;—that Marquises were likewise not English, & that people were mere made Marquises, when it was not wished that they should be made Dukes.")

The term "viscount" (vice-comes) was originally a judicial honorific, long used in Anglo-Norman England to refer to a county sheriff. It was only turned into a noble title, with hereditary dignity, in England by Henry VI in 1440, following the similar transformation of that title in France.

The majority of viscountcies are held by peers with higher titles, such as duke, marquess or earl; this can come about for a number of reasons, including the title being created as a subsidiary title at the same time as the higher peerage, the holder being elevated at a later time to a higher peerage or through inheritance when one individual is the heir to two separate titles.

Viscounts were created in the peerages of England and Scotland until the Act of Union 1707, thereafter being created in the peerage of Great Britain. After the Acts of Union 1800 came into effect in 1801, all peerages were created in the Peerage of the United Kingdom. Viscounts in the Peerage of Ireland were created by English and British monarchs in their capacity as Lord or King of Ireland. Irish peers were not initially granted a seat in the House of Lords and so allowed the grantee to sit in the House of Commons. Viscounts of Ireland have precedence below peers of England, Scotland, and Great Britain of the same rank, and above peers of the United Kingdom of the same rank; but Irish peers created after 1801 yield to United Kingdom peers of earlier creation.

A number of Speakers of the House of Commons have been elevated to the peerage as viscounts. Of the nineteen Speakers between 1801 and 1983, eleven were made viscounts, five were made barons, one refused a peerage and two died in office (and their widows were created a viscountess and a baroness). (Note: The first viscounts Sidmouth, Canterbury, Eversley, Ossington, Hampden, Peel, Selby, Ullswater, Ruffside, Dunrossil and Tonypandy were all retired Speakers of the House of Commons.) The last such was George Thomas, 1st Viscount Tonypandy upon his retirement in 1983. Since then it has become more common to grant life peerages to retiring Speakers.

== Naming conventions ==
In British practice, the title of a viscount may be either a place name, a surname, or a combination thereof: examples include the Viscount Falmouth, the Viscount Hardinge and the Viscount Colville of Culross, respectively. An exception exists for Viscounts in the peerage of Scotland, who were traditionally styled "The Viscount of [X]", such as the Viscount of Arbuthnott. In practice, however, very few maintain this style, instead using the more common version "The Viscount [X]" in general parlance.

== Courtesy viscountcies ==
Many extant viscountcies are used as courtesy titles; a specifically British custom is the heir apparent of an earl or marquess being referred to as a viscount, if the second most senior title held by the head of the family is a viscount. For example, the eldest son of the Earl Howe is Viscount Curzon, because this is the second most senior title held by the Earl. However, the son of a marquess or an earl can be referred to as a viscount when the title of viscount is not the second most senior if those above it share their name with the substantive title. For example, the second most senior title of the Marquess of Salisbury is the Earl of Salisbury, so his heir uses the lower title of Viscount Cranborne, to avoid any possible confusion caused by them both being referred to as Lord Salisbury. Sometimes the son of a peer can be referred to as a viscount even when he could use a more senior courtesy title which differs in name from the substantive title. Family tradition plays a role in this. For example, the eldest son of the Marquess of Londonderry is Viscount Castlereagh, even though the Marquess is also the Earl Vane.

== Viscountcies in the Peerage of England, 1440–1707 ==
English Viscountcy	Date of creation	Surname	Current status	Notes
Beaumont	1440	Beaumont	Extinct 1507	Also Baron Beaumont
Bourchier	14 December 1446	Bourchier	Extinct 1540	Created Earl of Essex in 1461.
Lisle	30 October 1451	Talbot	Extinct 1470	—
Berkeley	21 April 1481	de Berkeley	Extinct 1492	Created Earl of Nottingham in 1483 and Marquess of Berkeley in 1489.
Lisle	28 June 1483	Grey	Extinct 1504	—
Lovell	4 January 1483	Lovell	Extinct 1487	Also Baron Lovell and Baron Holand
Welles	1487	Welles	Extinct 1499	—
Lisle	15 May 1513	Brandon	Surrendered 1523	Created Duke of Suffolk in 1523.
Lisle	25 April 1523	Plantagenet	Extinct 1542	—
Rochford	1525	Boleyn	Extinct 1539	Created Earl of Ormonde in 1527 and Earl of Wiltshire in 1529.
FitzWalter	18 June 1525	Radclyffe	Extinct 1643	Created Earl of Sussex in 1529.
Beauchamp	5 June 1536	Seymour	Forfeit 1551	Created Earl of Hertford in 1537 and Duke of Somerset in 1546.
Lisle	12 March 1543	Dudley	Forfeit 1553	Created Earl of Warwick in 1547 and Duke of Northumberland in 1551.
Hereford	2 February 1550	Devereux	Extant	Created Earl of Essex in 1572 (earldom extinct 1646).
Montagu	1554	Browne	Extinct 1797	—
Howard of Bindon	13 January 1558	Howard	Extinct 1610	—
Cranborne	20 August 1604	Cecil	Extant	Created Earl of Salisbury in 1605 and Marquess of Salisbury in 1789.
L'Isle	4 May 1605	Sydney	Extinct 1743	Created Earl of Leicester in 1618.
Rochester	1611	Carr	Extinct 1645	Created Earl of Somerset in 1613.
Brackley	7 November 1616	Egerton	Extinct 1829	Created Earl of Bridgewater in 1617 and Duke of Bridgewater in 1720 (dukedom extinct in 1803).
Wallingford	1616	Knollys	Extinct 1632	Created Earl of Banbury in 1626.
Villiers	27 August 1616	Villiers	Extinct 1687	Created Earl of Buckingham in 1617, Marquess of Buckingham in 1618 and Duke of Buckingham in 1623.
Doncaster	5 July 1618	Hay	Extinct 1660	Created Earl of Carlisle in 1622.
Purbeck	19 July 1619	Villiers	Extinct 1657	—
Mandeville	1620	Montagu	Extant	Created Earl of Manchester in 1626 and Duke of Manchester in 1719.
Feilding	30 December 1620	Feilding	Extant	Created Earl of Desmond in 1622; also Earl of Denbigh from 1675.
Mansfield	3 November 1620	Cavendish	Extinct 1691	Created Earl of Newcastle in 1628, Marquess of Newcastle in 1643 and Duke of Newcastle in 1665.
Colchester	5 July 1621	Darcy	Extinct 1735	Created Earl Rivers in 1626.
St Alban	1621	Bacon	Extinct 1626	Also Baron Verulam
Thame	1621	Bertie	Extinct 1624	Subsidiary title of the Earl of Berkshire
Rochford	6 July 1621	Carey	Extinct 1677	Created Earl of Dover in 1628.
Andover	23 January 1622	Howard	Extant	Created Earl of Berkshire in 1626; also Earl of Suffolk from 1745.
Maidstone	1623	Finch	Extant	Created Countess of Winchilsea in 1628; also Earl of Nottingham from 1729.
Saye and Sele	1624	Fiennes	Extinct 1781	Created for William Fiennes, 8th Baron Saye and Sele.
Tunbridge	3 April 1624	Bourke	Extinct 1657	Subsidiary title of Earl of Clanricarde; created Earl of St Albans in 1628 and Marquess of Clanricarde in 1646
Wimbledon	9 November 1625	Cecil	Extinct 1638	Also Baron Cecil of Putney
Savage	1626	Savage	Extinct 1737	Succeeded as Earl Rivers in 1640.
Conway	26 June 1627	Conway	Extinct 1683	Also Viscount Killultagh; created Earl of Conway in 1679
Newark	1627	Pierrepont	Extinct 1773	Subsidiary title of the Earl of Kingston-upon-Hull; created Marquess of Dorchester in 1706 and Duke of Kingston-upon-Hull in 1715
Wentworth	13 December 1628	Wentworth	Extinct 1695	Created Earl of Strafford in 1640.
Ascott	2 August 1628	Dormer	Extinct 1709	Subsidiary title of the Earl of Carnarvon
Bayning	1628	Bayning	Extinct 1638	—
Campden	5 May 1628	Hicks	Extinct 1798	Created Earl of Gainsborough in 1682.
Dorchester	25 July 1628	Carleton	Extinct 1632	—
Galway	1628	Bourke	Extinct 1657	Subsidiary title of the Earl of St Albans and Earl of Clanricarde; created Marquess of Clanricarde in 1646
Savile	11 June 1628	Savile	Extinct 1671	Created Earl of Sussex in 1644.
Stafford	1640	Howard	Attainted 1680	—
Fauconberg	31 January 1643	Belasyse	Extinct 1815	Created Earl Fauconberg in 1689 (extinct 1700) and in 1756 (extinct 1802). Also Baron Fauconberg..
Mordaunt	1659	Mordaunt	Extinct 1814	Succeeded as Earl of Peterborough in 1697.
Hinchingbrooke	12 July 1660	Montagu	Extant	Subsidiary title of the Earl of Sandwich
Malden	20 April 1661	Capel	Extant	Subsidiary title of the Earl of Essex
Howard of Morpeth	30 January 1661	Howard	Extant	Subsidiary title of the Earl of Carlisle
Cornbury	20 April 1661	Hyde	Extinct 1753	Subsidiary title of the Earl of Clarendon
Granville	20 April 1661	Granville	Extinct 1711	Subsidiary title of the Earl of Bath
Craven	1663	Craven	Extinct 1697	Subsidiary title of the Earl of Craven
Bruce	18 March 1664	Bruce	Extinct 1747	Subsidiary title of the Earl of Ailesbury; also Earl of Elgin
Halifax	13 January 1668	Saville	Extinct 1700	Created Earl of Halifax in 1679 and Marquess of Halifax in 1682.
Thetford	22 April 1672	Bennet, Fitzroy	Abeyant 1936 (Note: Unusually for a viscountcy, the viscountcy of Thetford was created with remainder to the heirs male and female of the first viscount, Henry Bennet, thus when John FitzRoy, the 10th Viscount died childess, the title fell into abeyance between his two sisters.)	Subsidiary title of the Earl of Arlington; also Duke of Grafton from 1723 to 1936
Ipswich	16 August 1672	FitzRoy	Extant	Subsidiary title of the Earl of Euston; created Duke of Grafton in 1675
Latimer	15 August 1673	Osborne	Extinct 1964	Created Earl of Danby in 1674, Marquess of Carmarthen in 1689 and Duke of Leeds in 1694.
Yarmouth	1673	Paston	Extinct 1732	Created Earl of Yarmouth in 1679.
Bayning	17 March 1674	Murray	Extinct 1678	Life peerage
Quarendon	5 June 1674	Lee	Extinct 1776	Subsidiary title of the Earl of Lichfield
Falmouth	1 October 1674	FitzRoy	Extinct 1716	Subsidiary title of the Earl of Northumberland; created Duke of Northumberland in 1683
Totnes	1675	FitzCharles	Extinct 1680	Subsidiary title of the Earl of Plymouth
Newport	11 March 1675	Newport	Extinct 1762	Created Earl of Bradford in 1694.
Sondes	8 April 1676	Sondes	Extinct 1709	Subsidiary title of the Earl of Feversham
Dursley	11 September 1679	Berkeley	Extinct 1942	Subsidiary title of the Earl of Berkeley
Bodmin	23 July 1679	Robartes	Extinct 1757	Subsidiary title of the Earl of Radnor
Brandon	23 July 1679	Gerard	Extinct 1702	Subsidiary title of the Earl of Macclesfield
Corbet	23 October 1679	Corbet	Extinct 1682	Life peerage
Townshend	1682	Townshend	Extant	Created Marquess Townshend in Great Britain in 1787.
Weymouth	1682	Thynne	Extant	Created Marquess of Bath in 1789.
Hyde	29 November 1682	Hyde	Extinct 1753	Subsidiary title of the Earl of Rochester
Hatton	11 December 1683	Hatton	Extinct 1762	—
Montgomery	24 March 1687	Herbert	Extinct 1748	Subsidiary title of the Marquess of Powis
Radclyffe and Langley	1688	Radclyffe	Forfeit 1716	Subsidiary title of Earl of Derwentwater
Monthermer	9 April 1689	Montagu	Extinct 1749	Subsidiary title of the Earl of Montagu; created Duke of Montagu in 1705
Woodstock	1689	Bentinck	Extant	Subsidiary title of the Earl of Portland; created Duke of Portland in 1716 (dukedom extinct in 1990)
Lumley	10 April 1689	Lumley	Extant	Created Earl of Scarbrough in 1690.
Sydney	9 April 1689	Sydney	Extinct 1704	Created Earl of Romney in 1694.
Longueville	21 April 1690	Yelverton	Extinct 1799	Created Earl of Sussex in 1717.
Villiers	1691	Villiers	Extant	Created Earl of Jersey in 1697.
Glendale	11 June 1695	Grey	Extinct 1701	Subsidiary title of the Earl of Tankerville
Tunbridge	1695	Nassau de Zuluystein	Extinct 1830	Subsidiary title of the Earl of Rochford
Lonsdale	28 May 1696	Lowther	Extinct 1751	—
Bury	10 February 1697	Keppel	Extant	Subsidiary title of the Earl of Albemarle
Deerhurst	26 April 1697	Coventry	Extant	Subsidiary title of the Earl of Coventry
Barfleur	7 May 1697	Russell	Extinct 1727	Subsidiary title of the Earl of Orford
Boston	1698	de Nassau d'Auverquerque	Extinct 1754	Subsidiary title of the Earl of Grantham
Goderich	14 November 1706	Grey	Extinct 1740	Subsidiary title of the Marquess of Kent; created Duke of Kent in 1710
Hinton	24 December 1706	Poulett	Extinct 1973	Subsidiary title of the Earl Poulett
Rialton	26 December 1706	Godolphin	Extinct 1766	Subsidiary title of the Earl of Godolphin
Malpas	29 December 1706	Cholmondeley	Extant	Subsidiary title of the Earl of Cholmondeley; created Marquess of Cholmondeley in 1815
Winchendon	1706	Wharton	Extinct 1731	Subsidiary title of the Earl of Wharton; created Marquess of Catherlough, Marquess of Wharton and Marquess of Malmesbury in 1715 and Duke of Wharton in 1718
Northallerton	1706	—	Merged in the crown 1727	Subsidiary of the Duke of Cambridge, later Prince of Wales and King

== Viscountcies in the Peerage of Scotland, 1606–1707 ==
Scottish Viscountcy	Date of creation	Surname	Current status	Notes
Fentoun	18 March 1606	Erskine	Extant	Created Earl of Kellie in 1619.
Haddington	1606	Ramsay	Extinct 1626	Created Earl of Holdernesse in 1621.
Lauderdale	1616	Maitland	Extant	Created Earl of Lauderdale in 1624.
Fentoun	12 March 1619	Erskine	Extant	Subsidiary title of the Earl of Kellie
Falkland	14 November 1620	Cary	Extant	—
Dunbar	14 November 1620	Constable	Dormant 1718	—
Stormont	16 August 1621	Murray	Extant	Succeeded as Earl of Mansfield in 1793 and inherited the senior earldom of Mansfield in 1843.
Air	2 February 1622	Crichton-Stuart	Extant	Created Earl of Dumfries in 1633; also Earl of Stair from 1758 to 1769; also Marquess of Bute from 1803.
Annand	c. 1622	Murray	Extinct 1658	Created Earl of Annandale in 1625.
Maitland	1624	Maitland	Extant	Subsidiary title of the Earl of Lauderdale
Dupplin	4 May 1627	Hay	Extant	Created Earl of Kinnoull in 1633.
Melgum	1627	Gordon	Extinct 1630	
Drumlanrig	1628	Douglas	Extant	Created Earl of Queensberry in 1628, created Marquess of Queensberry in 1682, created Duke of Queensberry, Marquess of Dumfriesshire, Earl of Drumlanrig and Sanquhar and Viscount of Nith, Torthorwald and Ross in 1684 (titles separated in 1810).
Stirling	4 September 1630	Alexander	Dormant 1739	Created Earl of Stirling in 1633.
Aboyne	20 April 1632	Gordon	Extinct 1649	—
Canada	14 June 1633	Alexander	Dormant 1739	Subsidiary title of the Earl of Stirling
Air	12 June 1633	Crichton	Extant	Subsidiary title of the Earl of Dumfries; already Viscount of Air from 1622
Belhaven	24 June 1633	Douglas	Extinct 1639	—
Kenmure	1633	Gordon	Dormant 1847	—
Drumlanrig	13 June 1633	Douglas	Extant	Subsidiary title of the Earl of Queensberry; created Marquess of Queensberry in 1682 and Duke of Queensberry in 1684
Arbuthnott	16 November 1641	Arbuthnott	Extant	—
Dudhope	1641	Scrimgeour	Extant	Created Earl of Dundee in 1660.
Frendraught	29 August 1642	Crichton	Forfeit 1690	—
Newburgh	13 September 1647	Levingston	Extant	Created Earl of Newburgh in 1660.
Oxfuird	1651	Makgill	Extant	Dormant 1706-1977
Kingston	6 February 1651	Seton	Forfeit 1715	—
Kynnaird	1660	Livingston	Extant	Subsidiary title of the Earl of Newburgh
Irvine	23 May 1661	Ingram	Extinct 1778	—
Annand	13 February 1661	Johnstone	Dormant 1792	Subsidiary title of the Earl of Annandale and Hartfell; became Marquess of Annandale, Earl of Hartfell, and Viscount of Annand in 1701
Dudhope	1661	Scrimgeour	Extant	Subsidiary title of the Earl of Dundee
Kilsyth	17 August 1661	Livingston	Forfeit 1716	—
Breadalbane	28 June 1677	Campbell	Resigned 1681	Subsidiary title of the Earl of Caithness
Osborne	2 February 1673	Osborne	Extinct 1964	Created Earl of Danby in 1674, Marquess Carmarthen in 1689 and Duke of Leeds in 1694, all in the Peerage of England.
Dunblane	1675	Osborne	Extinct 1964	Also Earl of Danby and Viscount Latimer in England and Viscount of Osborne, created Marquess Carmarthen in England in 1689 and Duke of Leeds in England in 1694
Balquhidder	17 February 1676	Murray	Extant	Subsidiary title of the Marquess of Atholl; created Duke of Atholl in 1703
Tay and Paintland	1677	Campbell	Extinct 1995	Subsidiary title Earl of Breadalbane and Holland; created Marquess of Breadalbane and Earl of Ormelie in the United Kingdom in 1831 (marquessate and Ormelie earldom extinct 1862)
Lyon	1677	Lyon	Extant	Subsidiary title of the Earl of Strathmore and Kinghorne, created Earl of Strathmore and Kinghorne in the United Kingdom in 1937
Lugtoun	29 May 1680	Leslie	Extinct 1681	Subsidiary title of the Duke of Rothes
Preston	21 May 1681	Graham	Extinct 1739	—
Newhaven	17 May 1681	Cheyne	Extinct 1728	—
Formartine	30 November 1682	Gordon	Extant	Subsidiary title of the Earl of Aberdeen; created Marquess of Aberdeen and Temair in 1916
Nith, Torthorwald and Ross	11 February 1682	Douglas	Extant	Subsidiary title of the Marquess of Queensberry; created Duke of Queensberry in 1684
Nith, Torthorwald and Ross	1684	Douglas	Extant	Subsidiary title of the Duke of Queensberry
Inverness	3 November 1684	Gordon	Extinct 1836	Subsidiary title of the Duke of Gordon
Melfort	14 April 1685	Drummond	Dormant 1902	Created Earl of Melfort in 1686; titles forfeited from 1715 to 1853.
Teviot	20 October 1685	Spencer	Extinct 1694	—
Tarbat	15 April 1685	Mackenzie	Forfeit 1746	Created Earl of Cromartie in 1703.
Forth	1686	Drummond	Dormant 1902	Subsidiary title of the Earl of Melfort; forfeit from 1715 to 1853 and dormant 1902
Fincastle	19 August 1686	Murray	Extant	Subsidiary title of the Earl of Dunmore
Strathallan	16 August 1686	Drummond	Extant	Also Earl of Perth from 1902
Dundee	12 November 1688	Graham	Forfeit 1690	—
Kirkcaldie	8 April 1690	Melville	Extant	Subsidiary title of the Earl of Melville; also Earl of Leven from 1707
Stair	21 April 1690	Dalrymple	Extant	Created Earl of Stair in 1703; also Earl of Dumfries from 1758 to 1769.
Walden	17 December 1694	Hay	Extant	Subsidiary title of the Marquess of Tweeddale
Kirkwall	3 January 1696	Hamilton	Extant	Subsidiary title of the Earl of Orkney
Teviot	4 December 1696	Livingston	Extinct 1711	—
Glenalmond	27 July 1696	Murray	Extinct 1724	Life peerage – subsidiary title to the Earl of Tullibardine; also Marquess of Atholl from 1703; created Duke of Atholl in 1703
Riccartoun	1697	Douglas	Extinct 1810	Subsidiary title of the Earl of Ruglen; also Earl of Selkirk from 1739 to 1744, Earl of March from 1748 and Duke of Queensberry from 1778
Peebles	1697	Douglas	Extant	Subsidiary title of the Earl of March; also Earl of Ruglen from 1748 to 1810, Duke of Queensberry from 1778 to 1810 and Earl of Wemyss from 1810
Blasonberrie	1697	Hume	Dormant 1794	Subsidiary title of the Earl of Marchmont
Seafield	1698	Ogilvy	Extant	Created Earl of Seafield in 1871.
Rosebery	1700	Primrose	Extant	Created Earl of Rosebery in 1703 and created Earl of Midlothian in 1911.
Lochow and Glenyla	23 June 1701	Campbell	Extant	Subsidiary title of the Duke of Argyll
Briene	23 June 1701	Kerr	Extant	Subsidiary title of the Marquess of Lothian
Reidhaven	1701	Ogilvie	Extant	Subsidiary title of the Earl of Seafield; also Earl of Findlater from 1711 to 1811
Annand	24 June 1701	Johnston	Dormant 1792	Subsidiary title of the Marquess of Annandale
Inglisberry and Nemphlar	25 July 1701	Carmichael	Dormant 1817	Subsidiary title of the Earl of Hyndford
Dalrymple	1703	Dalrymple	Extant	Subsidiary title of the Earl of Stair, also Viscount of Stair
Inverkeithing	1703	Primrose	Extant	Subsidiary title of the Earl of Rosebery; created Earl of Midlothian in 1911
Kelburn	12 April 1703	Boyle	Extant	Subsidiary title of the Earl of Glasgow
Kingarth	14 April 1703	Crichton-Stuart	Extant	Subsidiary title of the Earl of Bute; created Marquess of Bute, in 1796; also Earl of Dumfries from 1803
Jedburgh Forest	10 April 1703	Douglas	Extinct 1761	Subsidiary title of the Duke of Douglas
Aithrie	15 April 1703	Hope	Extant	Subsidiary title of the Earl of Hopetoun, created Marquess of Linlithgow in the United Kingdom in 1902
Balquhidder, Glenalmond and Glenlyon	1703	Murray	Extant	Subsidiary title of the Duke of Atholl, created Marquess of Tullibardine and Earl of Strathtay and Strathardle at the same time, also Marquess of Atholl, Earl of Atholl, Earl of Tullibardine and Viscount of Balquhidder
Garnock	10 April 1703	Lindsay-Crawford	Extant	Succeeded as Earl of Lindsay in 1749.
Primrose	1703	Primrose	Extinct 1741	—
Tarbat	1 January 1703	Mackenzie	Forfeit 1746	Subsidiary title of the Earl of Cromartie
Milsington	13 April 1703	Colyear	Extinct 1835	Subsidiary title of the Earl of Portmore
Hermitage	1706	Scott	Extinct 1807	Subsidiary title of Earl of Deloraine
Ilay	19 October 1706	Campbell	Extinct 1761	Subsidiary title of the Earl of Ilay; succeeded as Duke of Argyll in 1743
Dundaff	24 April 1707	Graham	Extant	Subsidiary title of the Duke of Montrose
Tiberris	1707	Douglas	Extinct 1778	Subsidiary title of Earl of Solway; succeeded as Duke of Queensberry in 1711 and as Marquess of Queensberry in 1715
Broxmouth	25 April 1707	Ker	Extant	Subsidiary title of the Duke of Roxburghe

== Viscountcies in the Peerage of Great Britain, 1707–1801 ==
Title	Date of creation	Surname	Current status	Notes
Tamworth	3 September 1711	Shirley	Extant	Subsidiary title of the Earl Ferrers
Lewisham	5 September 1711	Legge	Extant	Subsidiary title of the Earl of Dartmouth
Wentworth	29 June 1711	Wentworth	Extinct 1799	Subsidiary title of the Earl of Strafford
Bolingbroke	7 July 1712	St John	Extant	Also Viscount St John from 1751
Wilton	19 October 1714	Brydges	Extinct 1789	Subsidiary title of the Earl of Carnarvon; created Duke of Chandos in 1789
Sunbury	19 October 1714	Montagu	Extinct 1715	Subsidiary title of the Earl of Halifax
Tadcaster	19 October 1714	O'Brien	Forfeit 1741	Subsidiary title of the Earl of Thomond
Sondes	1714	Watson	Extinct 1746	Subsidiary title of the Earl of Rockingham
Haughton	19 October 1714	Pelham-Holles	Extinct 1768	Subsidiary title of the Earl of Clare; created Duke of Newcastle in 1715
Carteret	1 January 1715	Carteret	Extinct 1776	Subsidiary title of the Countess Granville
Sunbury	14 June 1715	Montagu	Extinct 1771	Subsidiary title of the Earl of Halifax
St John	2 July 1716	St John	Extant	Also Viscount Bolingbroke from 1751
Stanhope	3 July 1717	Stanhope	Extant	Created Earl Stanhope in 1718 (earldom extinct 1967); also Earl of Harrington from 1967.
Coningsby	26 January 1717	Newton	Extinct 1761	Succeeded as Countess Coningsby in 1729.
Cobham	23 May 1718	Temple	Extant	Created Earl Temple in 1749, Marquess of Buckingham in 1784 and Duke of Buckingham and Chandos in 1822 (dukedom extinct 1889), and Earl Temple of Stowe in 1822.
Caversham	8 May 1718	Cadogan	Extinct 1726	Subsidiary title of the Earl Cadogan
Fordwich	18 March 1718	Cowper	Extinct 1905	Subsidiary title of the Earl Cowper
Sherard	31 October 1718	Sherard	Extinct 1859	Created Earl of Harborough in 1719.
Falmouth	9 June 1720	Boscawen	Extant	Created Earl of Falmouth in 1821 (earldom extinct 1852).
Lymington	11 June 1720	Wallop	Extant	Created Earl of Portsmouth in 1753.
Torrington	21 September 1721	Byng	Extant	—
Parker	15 November 1721	Parker	Extant	Subsidiary title of the Earl of Macclesfield
Harcourt	11 September 1721	Harcourt	Extinct 1830	Created Earl Harcourt in 1749.
Launceston	1726	—	Merged in the crown 1760	Subsidiary title of the Duke of Edinburgh, belonging to two Princes of Wales
Trematon	1726	—	Extinct 1765	Subsidiary title of the Duke of Cumberland
Chewton	13 September 1729	Waldegrave	Extant	Subsidiary title of the Earl Waldegrave
Pevensey	1730	Compton	Extinct 1742	Subsidiary title of the Earl of Wilmington
St Asaph	14 May 1730	Ashburnham	Extinct 1924	Subsidiary title of the Earl of Ashburnham
Harwich	14 May 1730	Mildmay	Extinct 1756	Subsidiary title of the Earl FitzWalter
Higham	19 November 1733	Watson-Wentworth	Extinct 1782	Subsidiary title of Earl of Malton; created Marquess of Rockingham in 1746
Petersham	9 February 1742	Stanhope	Extant	Subsidiary title of the Earl of Harrington
Walpole	1742	Walpole	Extinct 1797	Subsidiary title of Earl of Orford
Pulteney	14 July 1742	Pulteney	Extinct 1764	Subsidiary title of the Earl of Bath
Coke	9 May 1744	Coke	Extinct 1759	Subsidiary title of the Earl of Leicester
Trentham	8 July 1746	Leveson-Gower	Extant	Subsidiary title of the Earl Gower; created Marquess of Stafford in 1786 and Duke of Sutherland in 1833; also Earl of Ellesmere from 1963
Milton	6 September 1746	Wentworth-FitzWilliam	Extinct 1979	Subsidiary title of the Earl FitzWilliam
Leinster	1747	FitzGerald	Extant	Also Earl of Kildare; created Marquess of Kildare in 1761 and Duke of Leinster in 1766
Folkestone	1747	de Bouverie	Extant	Created Earl of Radnor in 1765.
Ludlow	27 May 1748	Herbert	Extinct 1801	Subsidiary title of the Earl of Powis
Nuneham	1 December 1749	Harcourt	Extinct 1830	Subsidiary title of the Earl Harcourt
Beauchamp	3 August 1750	Seymour	Extant	Subsidiary title of the Earl of Hertford; created Marquess of Hertford in 1793
Brome	30 June 1753	Cornwallis	Extinct 1852	Subsidiary title of the Earl Cornwallis; also Marquess Cornwallis from 1792 to 1823
Royston	2 April 1754	Yorke	Extant	Subsidiary title of the Earl of Hardwicke
Barnard	3 April 1754	Vane	Extinct 1891	Subsidiary title of the Earl of Darlington; created Marquess of Cleveland in 1827 and Duke of Cleveland in 1833
Cantelupe	18 March 1761	West	Extant	Subsidiary title of the Earl De La Warr
Spencer	3 April 1761	Spencer	Extant	Created Earl Spencer in 1765.
Courtenay	6 May 1762	Courtenay	Extinct 1835	Subsidiary title of the Earl of Devon
Wentworth	1762	Noel	Extinct 1815	—
Dudley and Ward	21 April 1763	Ward	Extinct 1833	Created Earl of Dudley in 1827.
Althorp	1 November 1765	Spencer	Extant	Subsidiary title of the Earl Spencer
Maynard	28 October 1766	Maynard	Extinct 1865	—
Pitt	4 August 1766	Pitt	Extinct 1835	Subsidiary title of the Earl of Chatham
Fairford	28 August 1772	Hill	Extant	Subsidiary title of the Earl of Hillsborough; created Marquess of Downshire in 1789
Hampden	14 June 1776	Hampden-Trevor	Extinct 1824	—
Mount Edgcumbe and Valletort	1781	Edgcumbe	Extant	Created Earl of Mount Edgcumbe in 1789.
Sackville	11 February 1782	Sackville	Extinct 1843	Succeeded as Duke of Dorset in 1815.
Howe	20 April 1782	Howe	Extinct 1799	Created Earl Howe in 1788.
Keppel	22 April 1782	Keppel	Extinct 1786	—
Lonsdale	24 May 1784	Lowther	Extinct 1802	Subsidiary title of the Earl of Lonsdale
Lowther	24 May 1784	Lowther	Extinct 1802	Subsidiary title of the Earl of Lonsdale
Nevill	17 May 1784	Nevill	Extant	Subsidiary title of the Earl of Abergavenny; created Marquess of Abergavenny in 1876
Ingestre	1784	Chetwynd-Talbot	Extant	Subsidiary title of the Earl Talbot; also Earl of Shrewsbury and Earl of Waterford from 1849
Belgrave	5 July 1784	Grosvenor	Extant	Subsidiary title of the Earl Grosvenor; created Marquess of Westminster in 1831 and Duke of Westminster in 1874
Calne and Calstone	1784	Petty-Fitzmaurice	Extant	Subsidiary title of the Marquess of Lansdowne; also Earl of Kerry from 1818
Bayham	13 May 1786	Pratt	Extant	Subsidiary title of the Earl Camden; created Marquess Camden in 1812
Hamilton	24 August 1786	Hamilton	Extant	Also Earl of Abercorn; created Marquess of Abercorn in 1790 and Duke of Abercorn in 1868
Ebrington	1 September 1789	Fortescue	Extant	Subsidiary title of the Earl Fortescue
Sydney	11 June 1789	Townshend	Extinct 1890	Created Earl Sydney in 1874.
Coleshill	1 November 1790	Digby	Extinct 1856	Subsidiary title of the Earl Digby
Milton	18 May 1792	Damer	Extinct 1808	Subsidiary title of the Earl of Dorchester
Mountjoy	19 March 1796	Crichton-Stuart	Extant	Subsidiary title of the Marquess of Bute; also Earl of Dumfries from 1803
Hood	1 June 1796	Hood	Extant	—
Newark	23 July 1796	Pierrepont	Extinct 1955	Created Earl Manvers in 1806.
Lowther	26 October 1797	Lowther	Extant	Also Earl of Lonsdale until 1802; created Earl of Lonsdale in 1807
Duncan	30 October 1797	Haldane-Duncan	Extinct 1933	Created Earl of Camperdown in 1831.
Chelsea	27 December 1800	Cadogan	Extant	Subsidiary title of the Earl Cadogan
Fitz-Harris	1800	Harris	Extant	Subsidiary title of the Earl of Malmesbury
Bridport	16 June 1800	Hood	Extinct 1814	—

== Viscountcies in the Peerage of Ireland, c. 1406–1816 ==
Irish Viscountcy	Date of creation	Surname	Current status	Notes
Gormanston	1478	Preston	Extant	Forfeit 1691 to 1800
Grane	2 January 1536	Grey	Forfeit 1541	—
Thurles	2 January 1536	Butler	Dormant 1997	Succeeded as Earl of Ossory and Earl of Ormonde in 1539.
Kilmaule	1537	FitzMaurice	Extinct 1541	—
Buttevant (Note: The exact date of the elevation of Viscount Buttevant is uncertain, though it is thought to be sometime around the turn of the 15th century:'The earliest document which mentions the title of VISCOUNT BUTTEVANT, bears the date in 1406, and is enrolled on the patent roll, in the rolls office of chancery, in Ireland, of the 12th of King James I. It recites that John Barry, esq. required a certain deed to be enrolled in chancery, dated the Monday next before the Epiphany, in the 7th of King Henry IV., (1406,) whereby James, VISCOUNT BUTTEVANT, granted to John Stapleton, gentleman, the lands of the Island Cullyne, at the rent of two shillings Irish per annum. This James was probably created VISCOUNT BUTTEVANT, either by King Richard II. on his last visit to Ireland, or by Henry IV. soon after his accession'. 'G.D. Burtchaell, who has investigated this question thoroughly, writes; " I am convinced that the titles of Viscount Buttevant and Viscount Fermoy were unknown before the reign of Henry VIII, and that such titles were never created; and that Lord Barry and Lord Roche managed to get themselves acknowledged as Viscounts with precedence before Gormanston, who was the first and only Viscount until Barry and Roche insisted on being treated as such." ' - Complete Peerage, 2nd edition, Vol 1, Appendix A, P 459)	c. 1541	Barry	Extinct 1823	Created Earl of Barrymore in 1628.
Baltinglass	29 June 1541	Eustace	Extinct 1585	—
Clontarf	5 November 1541	Rawson	Extinct 1560	—
Mountgarret	1550	Butler	Extant	—
Decies	31 January 1569	FitzGerald	Extinct 1572	—
Butler of Tulleophelim	4 August 1603	Butler	Extinct 1613	—
Ranelagh	1611	Jones	Extinct 1885	Created Earl of Ranelagh in 1677 (earldom extinct 1711).
Powerscourt	19 February 1618	Wingfield	Extinct 1634	—
Dunluce	28 May 1618	MacDonnell	Extinct 1791	Subsidiary title of the Earl of Antrim; created Marquess of Antrim in 1789
Dungarvan	26 October 1620	Boyle	Extant	Subsidiary of the Earl of Cork
Grandison	3 January 1621	St John, Villiers	Extant	Created Earl Grandison in 1721 (earldom extinct 1766); also Earl of Jersey from 1766.
Wilmot	4 January 1621	Wilmot	Extinct 1681	Created Earl of Rochester in 1652.
Valentia	1 March 1621	Power	Extinct 1642	—
Moore	7 February 1622	Moore	Extant	Created Earl of Drogheda in 1661 and Marquess of Drogheda in 1791, (marquessate extinct 1892).
Dillon	16 March 1622	Dillon	Extant	—
Loftus	10 May 1622	Loftus	Extinct 1725	—
Beaumont of Swords	20 May 1622	Beaumont	Extinct 1702	—
Netterville	3 April 1622	Netterville	Extinct 1882	—
Montgomery	3 May 1622	Montgomery	Extinct 1757	Created Earl of Mount Alexander in 1661.
Claneboye	4 May 1622	Hamilton	Extinct 1675	Created Earl of Clanbrassil in 1647.
Gallen-Ridgeway	23 August 1622	Ridgeway	Extinct 1714	Subsidiary title of the Earl of Londonderry
Callan	7 November 1622	Feilding	Extant	Succeeded as Earl of Desmond in 1628; also Earl of Denbigh from 1675.
Magennis	18 July 1623	Magennis	Forfeit 1691	—
Lecale	12 November 1624	Cromwell	Extinct 1687	Created Earl of Ardglass in 1645.
Chichester	1 April 1625	Chichester	Extant	Created Earl of Donegall in 1647 and Marquess of Donegall in 1791.
Kilmorey	8 April 1625	Needham	Extant	Created Earl of Kilmorey in 1822.
Somerset	1626	Somerset	Extinct 1649	—
Carlingford	26 March 1627	Swift	Extinct 1634	—
Baltinglass	27 June 1627	Roper	Extinct 1672	—
Castleton	1627	Saunderson	Extinct 1723	Created Viscount Castleton again in 1716 and Earl Castleton in 1720.
Killultagh	15 March 1627	Conway	Extinct 1683	Created Viscount Conway in 1627 and Earl of Conway in 1679.
Mayo	21 June 1627	Bourke	Dormant or extinct 1767	—
Sarsfield	1627	Sarsfield	Forfeit 1691	—
Boyle of Kinalmeaky	28 February 1628	Boyle	Extant	Became Earl of Cork in 1643; also Earl of Orrery.
Chaworth	4 March 1628	Chaworth	Extinct 1693	—
Cholmondeley	2 July 1628	Cholmondeley	Extinct 1659	Created Earl of Leinster in 1645.
Lumley	12 July 1628	Lumley	Extant	Created Earl of Scarbrough in 1690.
Taaffe	1 August 1628	Taaffe	Suspended 1919 extinct 1967	Created Earl of Carlingford in 1661 (earldom extinct 1738); suspended under the Titles Deprivation Act 1917 (Note: The Titles Deprivation Act 1917 is an Act of Parliament of the United Kingdom which authorised enemies of the United Kingdom during the First World War to be deprived of their British peerages and royal titles. The Viscounts Taaffe had emigrated to continental Europe in the 17th century and remained loyal to the Austrian emperor during the war.. 'Their Lordships do humbly report to Your Majesty that the persons hereinafter named have adhered to Your Majesty's enemies during the present war: —His Royal Highness Leopold Charles, Duke of Albany, Earl of Clarence and Baron Arklow; His Royal Highness Ernest Augustus, Duke of Cumberland and Teviotdale, Earl of Armagh; His Royal Highness Ernest Augustus (Duke of Brunswick), Prince of Great Britain and Ireland; Henry, Viscount Taaffe of Corren and Baron of Ballymote.')
Molyneux	1628	Molyneux	Extinct 1972	Created Earl of Sefton in 1771.
Monson	1628	Monson	Extinct 1661	—
Muskerry	15 November 1628	Maccarty	Forfeit 1691	Created Earl of Clancarty in 1658.
Strangford	17 July 1628	Smythe	Extinct 1869	—
Scudamore	1 July 1628	Scudamore	Extinct 1716	—
Wenman	1628	Wenman	Extinct 1800	—
Ranelagh	1628	Jones	Extinct 1885	—
Bourke of Clanmories	20 April 1629	Bourke	Dormant or extinct	Became Earl of Clanricarde in 1635, exact fate uncertain.
FitzWilliam	5 August 1629	FitzWilliam	Extinct 1833	Created Earl of Tyrconnel in 1661 (earldom extinct in 1667).
Fairfax of Emley	10 February 1629	Fairfax	Extinct 1772	—
Ikerrin	12 May 1629	Butler	Extant	Created Earl of Carrick in 1748.
Clanmalier	22 December 1631	O'Dempsey	Extinct 1691	—
Valentia (Note: Francis Annesley, 1st Viscount Valentia, of the second creation, had a patent granted to him stating that the title of Viscount Valentia would devolve to him upon the death of Henry Power, 1st Viscount Valentia, of the first creation. Henry Power died without issue in 1642.)	1642	Annesley	Extant	Created Earl of Anglesey in 1661 (earldom became extinct 1761).
Cullen	11 August 1642	Cokayne	Extinct 1810	—
Carrington	4 November 1643	Smyth	Extinct 1706	—
Tracy	1643	Tracy	Extinct 1797	—
Bulkeley	19 January 1644	Bulkeley	Extinct 1822	—
Bellomont	18 July 1645	Bard	Extinct 1667	—
Ogle	1645	Ogle	Extinct 1682	—
Brouncker	12 September 1645	Brouncker	Extinct 1688	—
Ogle	23 December 1645	Ogle	Extinct 1682	—
Barnewall	29 June 1646	Barnewall	Extinct 1834	Dormant from 1800 to 1814
Galmoye	16 May 1646	Butler	Forfeit 1697	—
Kilcoursie	1 April 1647	Lambart	Extant	Subsidiary title of the Earl of Cavan
Tara	1650	Preston	Extinct 1674	—
Massereene	1660	Clotworthy, Skefington	Extant	Created Earl of Massereene (earldom extinct 1816); also Viscount Ferrard from 1831.
Coote	1660	Coote	Extinct 1802	Subsidiary title of the Earl of Mountrath
Shannon	6 September 1660	Boyle	Extinct 1699	—
Fanshawe	5 September 1661	Fanshawe	Extinct 1716	—
Cholmondeley	29 March 1661	Cholmondeley	Extant	Created Earl of Cholmondeley in 1706 and Marquess of Cholmondeley in 1815.
Dungannon	28 August 1662	Trevor	Extinct 1706	—
Clare	11 July 1662	O'Brien	Forfeit 1691	—
Tullogh	13 May 1662	Butler	Extinct 1686	Subsidiary title of the Earl of Arran
FitzHardinge	14 July 1663	Berkeley	Extinct 1712	Created Earl of Falmouth in 1664 (earldom extinct 1665).
Charlemont	8 October 1665	Caulfeild	Extant	Created Earl of Charlemont in 1763 (earldom extinct 1892).
Powerscourt	22 February 1665	Wingfield	Extinct 1717	—
Blessington	23 August 1673	Boyle	Extinct 1732	—
Decies	9 October 1673	Power	Extinct 1704	Subsidiary title of the Earl of Tyrone
Downe	19 July 1675	Ducie	Extinct 1679	—
Longford	8 November 1675	Aungier	Extinct 1705	Created Earl of Longford in 1677.
Granard	22 November 1675	Forbes	Extant	Created Earl of Granard in 1684.
Clonmore	13 April 1676	Butler	Extinct 1677	Subsidiary title of the Earl of Gowran
Lanesborough	31 July 1676	Lane	Extinct 1724	—
Downe	1680	Dawnay	Extant	—
Rosse	2 July 1681	Parsons	Extinct 1764	Created Earl of Rosse in 1718.
Mountjoy	19 March 1683	Stewart	Extinct 1769	Created Earl of Blessington in 1745.
Lisburne	29 January 1685	Loftus	Extinct 1689	—
Baltinglass	1685	Talbot	Forfeit 1691	Subsidiary title of the Earl of Tyrconnell
Dungan	2 January 1686	Dungan	Extinct 1715	Subsidiary title of the Earl of Limerick
Galway	2 June 1687	Bourke	Extinct 1691	—
Hewett	9 April 1689	Hewett	Extinct 1689	—
Galway	25 November 1692	Massue de Ruvigny	Extinct 1720	Created Earl of Galway in 1697.
Tullogh	1693	Butler	Extinct 1758	Subsidiary title of the Earl of Arran
Lisburne	5 June 1695	Vaughan	Extant	Created Earl of Lisburne in 1776.
Windsor	1699	Windsor	Extinct 1758	—
Howe	16 May 1701	Howe	Extinct 1814	Created Earl Howe in 1788 (earldom extinct 1799).
Strabane	2 September 1701	Hamilton	Extant	Already Earl of Abercorn; created Marquess of Abercorn in 1790 and Duke of Abercorn in 1868
Fermanagh	16 June 1703	Verney	Extinct 1791	Created Earl Verney in 1743.
Doneraile	23 June 1703	St Leger	Extinct 1767	—
Mount Cashell	31 January 1706	Davys	Extinct 1736	—
Castlecomer	1707	Wandesford	Extinct 1784	Created Earl Wandesford in 1758.
Castleton	1716	Saunderson	Extinct 1723	Already Viscount Castleton; created Earl Castleton in 1720
Molesworth	1716	Molesworth	Extant	—
Milton	21 July 1716	FitzWilliam	Extinct 1979	Subsidiary title of the Earl FitzWilliam
Allen	28 August 1717	Allen	Extinct 1845	—
Chetwynd	29 June 1717	Chetwynd	Extant	—
Midleton	1717	Brodrick	Extant	Created Earl of Midleton in 1920, (earldom extinct1979).
Boyne	20 August 1717	Hamilton	Extant	—
Hillsborough	21 August 1717	Hill	Extant	Created Earl of Hillsborough in 1751 and Marquess of Downshire in 1789.
Tyrconnel	23 June 1718	Brownlow	Extinct 1754	—
Fane	April 1718	Fane	Extinct 1766	—
Castlemaine	1718	Child	Extinct 1784	Created Earl Tylney in 1731.
Dunkerron	29 April 1719	Petty	Extinct 1751	Subsidiary title of the Earl of Shelburne
Limerick	13 May 1719	Hamilton	Extinct 1798	Created Earl of Clanbrassil in 1756.
Grimston	29 November 1719	Grimston	Extant	Created Earl of Verulam in 1815.
Barrington	1 July 1720	Barrington	Extinct 1990	—
Gage	14 September 1720	Gage	Extant	—
Blundell	22 November 1720	Blundell	Extinct 1756	—
Vane	1720	Vane	Extinct 1789	—
Tyrone	1720	Beresford	Extant	Created Earl of Tyrone in 1746 and Marquess of Waterford in 1789.
Clanmaurice	1723	Fitzmaurice	Extant	Subsidiary title of the Earl of Kerry; also Marquess of Lansdowne from 1818
Palmerston	16 January 1723	Temple	Extinct 1865	—
Perceval	25 February 1723	Perceval	Extinct 2011	Created Earl of Egmont in 1725.
Duncannon	28 February 1723	Ponsonby	Extant	Created Earl of Bessborough in 1739.
Darnley	7 March 1723	Bligh	Extant	Created Earl of Darnley in 1725.
Bateman	12 July 1725	Bateman	Extinct 1802	—
Gallen-Ridgeway	8 October 1726	Pitt	Extinct 1765	Subsidiary title of the Earl of Londonderry
Micklethwaite	1727	Micklethwaite	Extinct 1734	—
Galway	1727	Monckton, Monckton-Arundell	Extant	—
Lanesborough	12 August 1728	Butler	Extinct 1998	Created Earl of Lanesborough in 1756.
Maule	6 April 1743	Maule	Extinct 1782	Subsidiary title of the Earl Panmure
Powerscourt	4 February 1744	Wingfield	Extant	—
Grandison	10 April 1746	Mason, Mason-Villiers	Extinct 1800	Created Countess Grandison in 1767.
Ashbrook	30 September 1751	Flower	Extant	—
Bellfield	1751	Rochfort	Extinct 1814	Subsidiary title of the Earl of Belvidere
FitzMaurice	1751	Petty	Extant	Created Earl of Shelburne in 1753 and Marquess of Lansdowne in 1784.
Kilwarlin	3 October 1751	Hill	Extant	Subsidiary title of the Earl of Hillsborough; created Marquess of Downshire in 1789
Belfield	5 October 1751	Rochfort	Extinct 1814	Created Earl of Belvedere in 1756.
Jocelyn	6 December 1755	Jocelyn	Extant	Created Earl of Roden in 1771.
Boyle of Bandon	20 March 1756	Boyle	Extant	Subsidiary title of the Earl of Shannon
Loftus	19 July 1756	Loftus	Extinct 1783	Created Earl of Ely in 1766 (earldom extinct 1769); created Earl of Ely in 1771.
Conyngham	20 July 1756	Conyngham	Extinct 1781	Created Earl Conyngham in 1781.
Ligonier	31 December 1757	Ligonier	Extinct 1770	Created Earl Ligonier in 1766.
Sudley	15 August 1756	Gore	Extant	Created Earl of Arran in 1762.
Macduff	26 April 1759	Duff	Extinct 1912	Subsidiary title of the Earl Fife; created Duke of Fife in 1889 and 1900
Wellesley	1760	Wesley, Wellesley	Extant	Subsidiary title of the Earl of Mornington. Held by the Duke of Wellington.
Russborough	8 September 1760	Leeson	Dormant 1891	Created Earl of Milltown in 1763.
Farnham	10 September 1760	Maxwell	Extinct 1779	Created Earl of Farnham in 1763.
Preston	3 October 1760	Ludlow	Extinct 1842	Subsidiary title of the Earl Ludlow
Carlingford	1 May 1761	Carpenter	Extinct 1853	Subsidiary title of the Earl of Tyrconnel
Headfort	12 April 1762	Taylour	Extant	Created Earl of Bective in 1766 and Marquess of Headfort in 1800.
Stopford	12 April 1762	Stopford	Extant	Subsidiary title of the Earl of Courtown
Ligonier	20 May 1762	Ligonier	Extinct 1782	Created Earl Ligonier in 1766 (earldom extinct 1770); created Earl Ligonier in 1776.
Barrells	16 May 1763	Knight	Extinct 1772	Subsidiary title of the Earl of Catherlough
Mountmorres	29 June 1763	Morres, De Montmorency	Extinct 1951	—
Dungannon	17 February 1766	Hill-Trevor	Extinct 1862	—
Langford	1766	Rowley	Extinct 1796	—
Turnour	1766	Turnour	Extant	Subsidiary title of the Earl Winterton
Mount Cashell	22 January 1766	Moore	Extinct 1915	Created Earl Mount Cashell in 1781.
Pollington	11 February 1766	Savile	Extant	Subsidiary title of the Earl of Mexborough
Glerawly	14 November 1766	Annesley	Extant	Created Earl Annesley in 1789.
Kingston	15 November 1766	King, King-Tenison	Extant	Created Earl of Kingston in 1768.
Clanwilliam	17 November 1766	Meade	Extant	Created Earl of Clanwilliam in 1776.
Fortrose	18 November 1766	Mackenzie	Extinct 1781	Created Earl of Seaforth in 1771.
St Lawrence	3 September 1767	St Lawrence	Extinct 1909	Subsidiary title of the Earl of Howth
Clare	19 January 1767	Nugent	Extinct 1788	Created Earl Nugent in 1776 (earldom extinct 1889).
Westport	24 August 1768	Browne	Extant	Created Earl of Altamont in 1771 and Marquess of Sligo in 1800.
Belleisle	25 August 1768	Gore	Extinct 1802	Created Earl of Ross in 1772.
Crosbie	30 November 1771	Crosbie	Extinct 1815	Created Earl of Glandore in 1776.
Aldborough	22 July 1776	Stratford	Extinct 1875	Created Earl of Aldborough in 1777.
Carlow	24 July 1776	Dawson	Extant	Created Earl of Portarlington in 1785.
Southwell	1776	Southwell	Extant	—
de Vesci	19 July 1776	Vesey	Extant	—
Enniskillen	20 July 1776	Cole	Extant	Created Earl of Enniskillen in 1789.
Clermont	1776	Fortescue	Extinct 1829	—
Orwell	1776	Vernon	Extinct 1783	Created Earl of Shipbrook in 1777.
Amiens	9 February 1777	Stratford	Extinct 1875	Subsidiary title of the Earl of Aldborough
Desart	6 January 1781	Cuffe	Extinct 1934	Created Earl of Desart in 1793.
Farnham	10 January 1781	Maxwell	Extinct 1823	Created Earl of Farnham in 1785.
Clifden	12 January 1781	Agar	Extinct 1974	—
Melbourne	1781	Lamb	Extinct 1853	—
Lifford	1781	Hewitt	Extant	—
Bangor	13 January 1781	Ward	Extant	—
Erne	6 January 1781	Creighton	Extant	Created Earl Erne in 1789.
Carhampton	9 January 1781	Luttrell	Extinct 1829	Created Earl of Carhampton in 1785.
Mayo	13 January 1781	Bourke	Extant	Created Earl of Mayo in 1785.
Doneraile	22 June 1785	St Leger	Extant	—
Wicklow	23 June 1785	Howard	Extinct 1978	Created Countess of Wicklow in 1793.
Pery	30 March 1785	Pery	Extinct 1806	—
Cremorne	19 June 1785	Dawson	Extinct 1813	—
Dunluce	19 June 1785	MacDonnell	Extant	Subsidiary title of the Earl of Antrim; created Marquess of Antrim in 1789 (marquessate extinct 1791)
Gosford	20 June 1785	Acheson	Extant	Created Earl of Gosford in 1806.
Clonmell	18 August 1789	Scott	Extinct 1935	Created Earl of Clonmell in 1793.
Belmore	6 December 1789	Lowry-Corry	Extant	Created Earl Belmore in 1797.
Conyngham	6 December 1789	Conyngham	Extant	Created Earl Conyngham in 1797 and Marquess Conyngham in 1816.
Loftus	28 December 1789	Loftus, Tottenham	Extant	Created Earl of Ely in 1794 and Marquess of Ely in 1800.
Harberton	5 July 1791	Pomeroy	Extant	—
Northland	1791	Knox	Extant	Created Earl of Ranfurly in 1831.
Macartney	19 July 1792	Macartney	Extinct 1806	Created Earl Macartney in 1794.
Hawarden	10 June 1793	Maude	Extant	Created Earl de Montalt in 1886 (earldom extinct in 1905).
Castle Cuffe	1793	Cuffe	Extinct 1934	Subsidiary title of the Earl of Desart
Castle Stewart	20 December 1793	Stewart-Moore	Extant	Created Earl Castle Stewart in 1800.
Landaff	4 December 1793	Mathew	Extinct or dormant 1833	Created Earl Landaff in 1797.
Leitrim	20 December 1793	Clements	Extinct 1952	Created Earl of Leitrim in 1795.
FitzGibbon	6 December 1793	FitzGibbon	Extinct 1864	Created Earl of Clare in 1795.
Castlereagh	1 October 1795	Stewart	Extant	Created Earl of Londonderry in 1796 and Marquess of Londonderry in 1816.
O'Neill	1795	O'Neill	Extinct 1855	—
Bandon	6 October 1795	Barnard	Extinct 1979	Created Earl of Bandon in 1800.
Oxmantown	6 October 1795	Parsons	Extinct 1807	Created Earl of Rosse in 1806.
Mountjoy	30 September 1795	Gardiner	Extinct 1829	Created Earl of Blessington in 1816.
Caledon	23 November 1797	Alexander	Extant	Created Earl of Caledon in 1800.
Carleton	21 November 1797	—	Extinct 1826	—
Mount Charles	5 November 1797	Conyngham	Extant	Subsidiary title of the Earl Conyngham; created Marquess Conyngham in 1816
Donoughmore	20 November 1797	Hely-Hutchinson	Extant	Created Earl of Donoughmore in 1800.
Ferrard|	1797	Foster, Skeffington	Extant	Also Viscount Massereene from 1831
Kenmare	12 February 1798	Browne	Extinct 1952	Created Earl of Kenmare in 1801.
Bernard	6 August 1800	Bernard	Extinct 1979	Subsidiary title of the Earl of Bandon
Raymond	August 1800	O'Neill	Extinct 1841	Subsidiary title of the Earl O'Neill
Limerick	29 December 1800	Pery	Extant	Created Earl of Limerick in 1803.
Avonmore	30 December 1800	Yelverton	Dormant 1910	—
Charleville	1800	Bury	Extinct 1875	Created Earl of Charleville in 1806.
Bantry	29 December 1800	White	Extinct 1891	Created Earl of Bantry in 1816.
Kilwarden	29 December 1800	Wolfe	Extinct 1830	—
Longueville	1800	Longfield	Extinct 1811	—
Somerton	30 December 1800	Agar	Extant	Created Earl of Normanton in 1806.
Monck	1801	Monck	Extant	—
Castlerosse	3 January 1801	Browne	Extinct 1953	Subsidiary title of the Earl of Kenmare
Dunlo	3 January 1801	Trench	Extant	Created Earl of Clancarty in 1803.
Newcomen	1803	Gleadowe-Newcomen	Extinct 1825	—
Lorton	28 May 1806	King	Extant	Succeeded as Earl of Kingston in 1869.
Templetown	1806	Upton	Extinct 1981	—
Lismore	30 May 1806	O'Callaghan	Extinct 1898	—
Frankfort de Montmorency	22 January 1816	de Montmorency	Extinct 1917	—
Gort	22 January 1816	Prendergast-Smyth, Vereker	Extant	Created Viscount Gort in the Peerage of the United Kingdom in 1946 (viscountcy extinct 1946).
Pevensey	1816	Baker-Holroyd	Extinct 1909	Subsidiary title of the Earl of Sheffield
Ennismore and Listowel	15 January 1816	Hare	Extant	Created Earl of Listowel in 1822.
Berehaven	22 January 1816	White	Extinct 1891	Subsidiary title of the Earl of Bantry
Caher	22 January 1816	Butler	Extinct 1858	Subsidiary title of the Earl of Glengall
Slane	22 January 1816	Conyngham	Extant	Subsidiary title of the Marquess Conyngham
Mount-Earl	5 February 1816	Quin	Extinct 2011	Created Earl of Dunraven and Mount-Earl in 1822.
Castlemaine	1822	Handcock	Extinct 1839	—
Newry and Morne	12 January 1822	Needham	Extant	Subsidiary title of the Earl of Kilmorey
Adare	5 February 1822	Quin	Extinct 2011	Subsidiary title of the Earl of Dunraven and Mount-Earl
Glandine	23 June 1827	Toler	Extant	Subsidiary title of the Earl of Norbury
Guillamore	28 January 1831	O'Grady	Extinct 1955	—

== Viscountcies in the Peerage of the United Kingdom, 1801–present ==
United Kingdom Viscountcy	Date of creation	Surname	Current status	Notes
St Vincent	27 April 1801	Jervis	Extant	Also Earl of St Vincent and Baron Jervis (earldom and barony extinct 14 March 1823)
Nelson	22 May 1801	Nelson	Extinct 21 October 1805	Also Baron Nelson
Uffington	18 June 1801	Craven	Extant	Subsidiary title of the Earl of Craven
Cranley	19 June 1801	Onslow	Extant	Subsidiary title of the Earl of Onslow
Marsham	22 June 1801	Marsham	Extant	Subsidiary title of the Earl of Romney
Grey de Wilton	26 June 1801	Egerton	Extant	Subsidiary title of the Earl of Wilton; also Baron Ebury from 1 October 1999
Curzon	27 February 1802	Curzon	Extant	Created Earl Howe on 16 July 1821.
Melville	24 December 1802	Dundas	Extant	Also Baron Dunira
Clive	14 May 1804	Clive	Extant	Subsidiary title of the Earl of Powis
Sidmouth	1805	Addington	Extant	
Merton	20 November 1805	Nelson	Extant	Subsidiary title of the Earl Nelson
Anson	17 February 1806	Anson	Extant	Created Earl of Lichfield on 15 September 1831.
Howick	11 April 1806	Grey	Extant	Subsidiary title of the Earl Grey
Lake	4 November 1807	Lake	Extinct 24 June 1848	Also Baron Lake
Cathcart	9 November 1807	Cathcart	Extant	Created Earl Cathcart on 16 July 1814.
Sandon	19 July 1809	Ryder	Extant	Subsidiary title of the Earl of Harrowby
Wellington	4 September 1809	Wellesley	Extant	Created Earl of Wellington on 28 February 1812; Marquess of Wellington on 3 October 1812 and Duke of Wellington on 11 May 1814; also Earl of Mornington from 25 July 1863.
Normanby	7 September 1812	Phipps	Extant	Subsidiary title of the Earl of Mulgrave; created Marquess of Normanby on 25 June 1838
Lascelles	7 September 1812	Lascelles	Extant	Subsidiary title of the Earl of Harewood
Melgund	24 February 1813	Elliot-Murray-Kynynmound	Extant	Subsidiary title of the Earl of Minto
Whitworth	14 June 1813	Whitworth	Extinct 12 May 1825	Created Earl Whitworth on 25 November 1815.
Keith	1 June 1814	Elphinstone	Extinct 10 March 1823	—
Gordon	16 July 1814	Gordon	Extant	Also Earl of Aberdeen; created Marquess of Aberdeen and Temair in 1916
Granville	12 August 1815	Leveson-Gower	Extant	Created Earl Granville on 10 May 1833.
Grimston	24 November 1815	Grimston	Extant	Subsidiary title of the Earl of Verulam
Alford	27 November 1815	Cust	Extinct 17 March 1921	Subsidiary title of the Earl Brownlow
Boringdon	29 November 1815	Parker	Extant	Subsidiary title of the Earl of Morley
Newport	30 November 1815	Bridgeman	Extant	Subsidiary title of the Earl of Bradford
Elmley	1 December 1815	Lygon	Extinct 1979	Subsidiary title of the Earl Beauchamp
Exmouth	10 December 1816	Pellew	Extant	Also Baron Exmouth
Loudoun	13 February 1817	Rawdon-Hastings	Extinct 1 November 1868	Subsidiary title of the Marquess of Hastings
Encombe	7 July 1821	Scott	Extant	Subsidiary title of the Earl of Eldon
Savernake	17 July 1821	Brudenell-Bruce	Extant	Subsidiary title of the Marquess of Ailesbury
Eastnor	17 July 1821	Cocks	Extinct 26 September 1883	Subsidiary title of the Earl Somers
Dunwich	18 July 1821	Rous	Extant	Subsidiary title of the Earl of Stradbroke
Hutchinson	14 July 1821	Hely-Hutchinson	Extant	Also Earl of Donoughmore
Beresford	22 April 1823	Beresford	Extinct 1854	Also Baron Beresford
Seaham	8 July 1823	Vane	Extant	Subsidiary title of the Earl Vane; also Marquess of Londonderry until 1854 and from 1872
Clancarty	17 November 1823	Trench	Extant	Also Earl of Clancarty
Holmesdale	2 December 1826	Amherst	Extinct 4 March 1993	Subsidiary title of the Earl Amherst
Combermere	8 February 1827	Cotton	Extant	Also Baron Combermere
Goderich	28 April 1827	Robinson	Extinct 22 September 1923	Created Earl of Ripon on 13 April 1833; also Earl de Grey from 14 November 1859; created Marquess of Ripon on 23 June 1871.
Ednam	5 October 1827	Ward	Extinct 6 March 1833	Subsidiary title of the Earl of Dudley
Emlyn	6 October 1827	Campbell	Extant	Subsidiary title of the Earl Cawdor
Canning	1828	Canning	Extinct 17 June 1862	Created Earl Canning on 21 May 1859.
FitzClarence	4 June 1831	FitzClarence	Extinct 30 December 2000	Subsidiary title of the Earl of Munster
Lambton	23 March 1833	Lambton	Extant	Subsidiary title of the Earl of Durham
Canterbury	10 March 1835	Manners Sutton	Extinct 26 February 1941	Created Baron Bottesford at the same time.
Coke	12 August 1837	Coke	Extant	Subsidiary title of the Earl of Leicester
Ockham	30 June 1838	King	Extinct 5 February 2018	Subsidiary title of the Earl of Lovelace
Ponsonby	20 April 1839	Ponsonby	Extinct 21 February 1855	Also Baron Ponsonby of Imokilly
Campden	16 August 1841	Noel	Extant	Subsidiary title of the Earl of Gainsborough
Hill	27 September 1842	Hill	Extant	Also Baron Hill (barony extinct 10 December 1842); also Baron Hill
Southam	22 October 1844	Law	Extinct 22 December 1871	Subsidiary title of the Earl of Ellenborough
Hardinge	2 May 1846	Hardinge	Extant	—
Brackley	6 July 1846	Egerton	Extant	Subsidiary title of the Earl of Ellesmere; also Duke of Sutherland from 1 February 1963
Enfield	18 September 1847	Byng	Extant	Subsidiary title of the Earl of Strafford
Gough	15 June 1849	Gough	Extinct 14 April 2023	Also Baron Gough
Crowhurst	11 June 1850	Pepys	Extant	Subsidiary title of the Earl of Cottenham
Stratford de Redcliffe	1 May 1852	Canning	Extinct 14 August 1880	—
Dangan	11 April 1857	Wellesley	Extant	Subsidiary title of the Earl Cowley
Eversley	11 April 1857	Shaw-Lefevre	Extinct 28 December 1888	—
Ednam	17 February 1860	Ward	Extant	Subsidiary title of the Earl of Dudley
Amberley	30 July 1861	Russell	Extant	Subsidiary title of the Earl Russell
Tarbat	21 October 1861	Leveson-Gower	Extant	Subsidiary title of the Countess of Cromartie
Halifax	21 February 1866	Wood	Extant	Created Earl of Halifax on 11 July 1944.
Bridport	6 July 1868	Hood	Extant	Also Baron Bridport
Helmsley	25 July 1868	Duncombe	Extinct 4 September 1963	Subsidiary title of the Earl of Feversham
Beaconsfield	30 November 1868	Disraeli	Extinct 15 December 1872	—
Clandeboye	13 November 1871	Blackwood	Extinct 1988	Subsidiary title of the Earl of Dufferin; created Marquess of Dufferin and Ava on 17 November 1888
Ossington	13 February 1872	Denison	Extinct 7 March 1873	—
Portman	28 March 1873	Portman	Extant	Also Baron Portman
Cardwell	6 March 1874	Cardwell	Extinct 15 February 1886	—
Carlton	1876	Stuart-Wortley-Mackenzie	Extant	Subsidiary title of the Earl of Wharncliffe
Baring	10 June 1876	Baring	Extinct 12 April 1929	Subsidiary title of the Earl of Northbrook
Hughenden	21 August 1876	Disraeli	Extinct 19 April 1881	Subsidiary title of the Earl of Beaconsfield
Cranbrook	4 May 1878	Hardy	Extant	Created Earl of Cranbrook on 22 August 1892.
Garmoyle	27 September 1878	Cairns	Extant	Subsidiary title of the Earl Cairns
Knebworth	28 April 1880	Bulwer-Lytton	Extant	Subsidiary title of the Earl of Lytton
Throwley	4 May 1880	Milles	Extinct 2 December 1996	Subsidiary title of the Earl Sondes
Sherbrooke	25 May 1880	Lowe	Extinct 27 July 1892	
Lyons	24 November 1881	Lyons	Extinct 5 December 1887	Also Baron Lyons
Wolmer	30 December 1882	Palmer	Extant	Subsidiary title of the Earl of Selborne
Hampden	4 March 1884	Brand	Extant	
Saint Cyres	3 July 1885	Northcote	Extant	Subsidiary title of the Earl of Iddesleigh
Wolseley	28 September 1885	Wolseley	Extinct 24 December 1936	Also Baron Wolseley
Oxenbridge	13 August 1886	Monson	Extinct 16 April 1898	Also Baron Monson
Cross	19 August 1886	Cross	Extinct 5 December 2004	—
Raincliffe	1 July 1887	Denison	Extinct 17 April 1937	Subsidiary title of the Earl of Londesborough
Hambleden	11 November 1891	Smith	Extant	—
Peel	9 May 1895	Peel	Extant	Created Earl Peel on 10 July 1929.
Wendover	16 July 1895	Carington	Extinct 13 June 1928	Subsidiary title of the Earl Carrington; created Marquess of Lincolnshire in 1911
Knutsford	3 August 1895	Holland	Extant	Also Baron Knutsford
Llandaff	5 August 1895	Matthews	Extinct 13 April 1913	
Salford	22 July 1897	Egerton	Extinct 16 March 1909	Subsidiary title of the Earl Egerton
Esher	11 November 1897	Brett	Extant	Also Baron Esher
Tiverton	1898	Giffard	Extinct 31 December 2010	Subsidiary title of the Earl of Halsbury
Cromer	25 January 1899	Baring	Extant	Created Earl of Cromer on 6 August 1901.
Goschen	18 December 1900	Goschen	Extant	
Ridley	19 December 1900	Ridley	Extant	—
St Pierre	11 February 1901	Roberts	Extinct 21 February 1955	Subsidiary title of the Earl Roberts
Errington	6 August 1901	Baring	Extant	Subsidiary title of the Earl of Cromer
Kitchener of Khartoum	11 July 1902	Kitchener	Extinct 16 December 2011	Created Earl Kitchener on 27 July 1914.
Colville of Culross	12 July 1902	Colville	Extant	—
Churchill	14 July 1902	Spencer	Extinct 18 October 2017	Also Baron Churchill
Milner	15 July 1902	Milner	Extinct 13 May 1925	Also Baron Milner
Selby	6 July 1905	Gully	Extant	
Windsor	18 December 1905	Windsor-Clive	Extant	Subsidiary title of the Earl of Plymouth
Iveagh	18 December 1905	Guinness	Extant	Created Earl of Iveagh on 30 September 1919.
Althorp	19 December 1905	Spencer	Extant	Succeeded as Earl Spencer in 1910.
Hawkesbury	22 December 1905	Foljambe	Extant	Subsidiary title of the Earl of Liverpool
Tredegar	28 December 1905	Morgan	Extinct 11 March 1913	Also Baron Tredegar
St Aldwyn	1906	Hicks-Beach	Extant	Created Earl St Aldwyn on 22 February 1915.
Wolverhampton	4 May 1908	Fowler	Extinct 9 March 1943	
Morley of Blackburn	1908	Morley	Extinct 1923	
Gladstone	15 March 1910	Gladstone	Extinct 6 March 1930	—
Haldane	27 March 1911	Haldane	Extinct 19 August 1928	
Mentmore	3 July 1911	Primrose	Extant	Subsidiary title of the Earl of Midlothian; also Earl of Rosebery
Hythe	5 July 1911	Brassey	Extinct 12 November 1919	Subsidiary title of the Earl Brassey
Elibank	3 July 1911	Murray	Extinct 5 December 1962	Also Lord Elibank
Knollys	4 July 1911	Knollys	Extant	Also Baron Knollys
Allendale	5 July 1911	Beaumont	Extant	Also Baron Allendale
Chilston	6 July 1911	Akers-Douglas	Extant	Also Baron Douglas of Baads
Scarsdale	2 November 1911	Curzon	Extant	Subsidiary title of the Earl Curzon of Kedleston; created Marquess Curzon of Kedleston on 28 June 1921 (earldom extinct 20 March 1925)
Alverstone	24 November 1913	Webster	Extinct 15 December 1915	Also Baron Alverstone
Bryce	1914	Bryce	Extinct 1922	
Buxton	11 May 1914	Buxton	Extinct 15 October 1934	Created Earl Buxton on 8 November 1920.
Broome	27 July 1914	Kitchener	Extinct 16 December 2011	Subsidiary title of the Earl Kitchener
Quenington	22 February 1915	Hicks-Beach	Extant	Subsidiary title of the Earl St Aldwyn
French	1916	French	Extinct 4 March 1988	Created Earl of Ypres on 5 June 1922.
Mersey	1916	Bigham	Extant	Also Baron Mersey
Chaplin	20 June 1916	Chaplin	Extinct 18 December 1981	
Reading	26 June 1916	Isaacs	Extant	Created Earl of Reading on 20 December 1917 and Marquess of Reading on 7 May 1926.
Grey of Fallodon	27 July 1916	Grey	Extinct 7 September 1933	—
Sandhurst	1917	Mansfield	Extinct 2 November 1921	Also Baron Sandhurst
Cowdray	1917	Pearson	Extant	Also Baron Cowdray
Harcourt	1917	Harcourt	Extinct 1979	—
Farquhar	21 June 1917	Townsend-Farquhar	Extinct 30 August 1923	Created Earl Farquhar on 30 November 1922.
Devonport	22 June 1917	Kearley	Extant	Also Baron Devonport
Astor	23 June 1917	Astor	Extant	Also Baron Astor
Northallerton	16 July 1917	Cambridge	Extinct 16 April 1981	Subsidiary title of the Marquess of Cambridge
Trematon	16 July 1917	Cambridge	Extinct 1957	Subsidiary title of the Earl of Athlone
Alderney	17 July 1917	Mountbatten	Extant	Subsidiary title of the Marquess of Milford Haven
Launceston	18 July 1917	Mountbatten	Extinct 23 February 1960	Subsidiary title of the Marquess of Carisbrooke
Erleigh	20 December 1917	Isaacs	Extant	Subsidiary title of the Earl of Reading; created Marquess of Reading on 7 May 1926
Northcliffe	1918	Harmsworth	Extinct 14 August 1922	Also Baron Northcliffe
Jellicoe	15 January 1918	Jellicoe	Extant	Created Earl Jellicoe on 29 June 1925.
Furness	1918	Furness	Extinct 1 May 1995	Also Baron Furness
Wimborne	15 June 1918	Guest	Extant	Also Baron Wimborne
St Davids	17 June 1918	Philipps	Extant	Also Baron St Davids; also Baron Strange, Baron Hungerford and Baron de Moleyns from 1974
Rhondda	19 June 1918	Thomas	Extinct 20 July 1958	Also Baron Rhondda (barony extinct 3 July 1918)
Bertie of Thame	2 September 1918	Bertie	Extinct 29 August 1954	Also Baron Bertie of Thame
Cave	14 November 1918	Cave	Extinct 29 March 1928	—
Finlay	27 March 1919	Finlay	Extinct 30 June 1945	Also Baron Finlay
Burnham	16 May 1919	Levy-Lawson	Extinct 20 July 1933	Also Baron Burnham
Rothermere	17 May 1919	Harmsworth	Extant	Also Baron Rothermere
Borodale	27 September 1919	Beatty	Extant	Subsidiary title of the Earl Beatty
Dawick	29 September 1919	Haig	Extant	Subsidiary title of the Earl Haig
Elveden	30 September 1919	Guinness	Extant	Subsidiary title of the Earl of Iveagh
Allenby	7 October 1919	Allenby	Extant	
Dunsford	2 February 1920	Brodrick	Extinct 2 November 1979	Subsidiary title of the Earl of Midleton
Novar	6 December 1920	Munro-Ferguson	Extinct 30 March 1934	
FitzAlan of Derwent	28 April 1921	Talbot, FitzAlan-Howard	Extinct 17 May 1962	
Chelmsford	3 June 1921	Thesiger	Extant	Also Baron Chelmsford
Long	4 June 1921	Long	Extant	—
Birkenhead	15 June 1921	Smith	Extinct 18 February 1985	Created Earl of Birkenhead on 28 November 1922.
Ullswater	8 July 1921	Lowther	Extant	
Pirrie	9 July 1921	Pirrie	Extinct 6 June 1924	Also Baron Pirrie
Traprain	5 May 1922	Balfour	Extant	Subsidiary title of the Earl of Balfour
Leverhulme	27 November 1922	Lever	Extinct 4 July 2000	Also Baron Leverhulme
Furneaux	28 November 1922	Smith	Extinct 18 February 1985	Subsidiary title of the Earl of Birkenhead
Lee of Fareham	28 November 1922	Lee	Extinct 21 July 1947	Also Baron Lee of Fareham
Younger of Leckie	20 February 1923	Younger	Extant	
Cecil of Chelwood	24 December 1923	Gascoyne-Cecil	Extinct 24 November 1958	
Inchcape	21 January 1924	Mackay	Extant	Created Earl of Inchcape on 20 June 1929.
Willingdon	23 June 1924	Freeman-Thomas	Extinct 19 March 1979	Created Earl of Willingdon on 20 February 1931 and Marquess of Willingdon on 26 May 1936.
Asquith	9 February 1925	Asquith	Extant	Subsidiary title of the Earl of Oxford and Asquith
Bearsted	16 June 1925	Samuel	Extant	Also Baron Bearsted
Brocas	29 June 1925	Jellicoe	Extant	Subsidiary title of the Earl Jellicoe
Dunedin	17 February 1926	Murray	Extinct 21 August 1942	Also Baron Dunedin
D'Abernon	20 February 1926	Vincent	Extinct 1 November 1941	Also Baron D'Abernon
Tredegar	4 August 1926	Morgan	Extinct 27 April 1949	Also Baron Tredegar
Craigavon	1927	Craig	Extinct 31 March 2025	—
Sumner	1927	Hamilton	Extinct 24 May 1934	Also Baron Sumner
Byng of Vimy	1928	Byng	Extinct 6 June 1935	Also Baron Byng of Vimy
Bridgeman	18 June 1929	Bridgeman	Extant	—
Glenapp	20 June 1929	Mackay	Extant	Subsidiary title of the Earl of Inchcape
Plumer	24 June 1929	Plumer	Extinct 24 February 1944	Also Baron Plumer
Hailsham	4 July 1929	Hogg	Extant	Also Baron Hailsham
Brentford	5 July 1929	Joynson-Hicks	Extant	
Clanfield	10 July 1929	Peel	Extant	Subsidiary title of the Earl Peel
Ratendone	20 February 1931	Freeman-Thomas	Extinct 19 March 1979	Subsidiary title of the Earl of Willingdon; created Marquess of Willingdon on 26 May 1936
Snowden	24 November 1931	Snowden	Extinct 15 May 1937	
Sankey	1932	Sankey	Extinct 6 February 1948	Also Baron Sankey
Buckmaster	24 February 1933	Buckmaster	Extant	Also Baron Buckmaster
Wakefield	28 June 1934	Wakefield	Extinct 1941	Also Baron Wakefield
Bledisloe	24 June 1935	Bathurst	Extant	Also Baron Bledisloe
Swinton	29 November 1935	Cunliffe-Lister	Extant	Created Earl of Swinton on 5 May 1955.
Monsell	30 November 1935	Eyres-Monsell	Extinct 28 November 1993	—
Hanworth	17 January 1936	Pollock	Extant	Also Baron Hanworth
Trenchard	1 February 1936	Trenchard	Extant	Also Baron Trenchard
Dawson of Penn	30 October 1936	Dawson	Extinct 7 March 1945	Also Baron Dawson of Penn
Greenwood	16 February 1937	Greenwood	Extinct 7 July 2003	Also Baron Greenwood
Corvedale	8 June 1937	Baldwin	Extant	Subsidiary title of the Earl Baldwin of Bewdley
Samuel	8 June 1937	Samuel	Extant	—
Horne of Slamannan	9 June 1937	Horne	Extinct 3 September 1940	—
Runciman of Doxford	10 June 1937	Runciman	Extant	Also Baron Runciman
Davidson	11 June 1937	Davidson	Extant	—
Nuffield	1938	Morris	Extinct 22 August 1963	Also Baron Nuffield
Weir	25 June 1938	Weir	Extant	Also Baron Weir
Stonehaven	27 June 1938	Baird	Extant	Succeeded as Earl of Kintore in 1974.
Caldecote	6 September 1939	Inskip	Extant	
Maugham	22 September 1939	Maugham	Extinct 13 March 1981	Also Baron Maugham for life (barony extinct 23 March 1958)
Simon	20 May 1940	Simon	Extinct 15 August 2021	—
Hewart	28 October 1940	Hewart	Extinct 23 July 1964	Also Baron Hewart
Camrose	1941	Berry	Extant	Also Baron Camrose
Bennett	16 July 1941	Bennett	Extinct 27 June 1947	—
Stansgate	1942	Benn	Extant	—
Margesson	27 April 1942	Margesson	Extant	
Viscountess Daventry	3 May 1943	FitzRoy	Extant	
Wavell	22 July 1943	Wavell	Extinct 24 December 1953	Created Earl Wavell on 1 May 1947.
Templewood	14 July 1944	Hoare	Extinct 7 May 1959	
Ruthven of Canberra	1945	Hore-Ruthven	Extant	Subsidiary title of the Earl of Gowrie, also Baron Gowrie
Portal	1 February 1945	Portal	Extinct 6 May 1949	Also Baron Portal
Gwynedd	12 February 1945	Lloyd-George	Extant	Subsidiary title of the Earl Lloyd-George of Dwyfor
Addison	2 July 1945	Addison	Extant	Also Baron Addison
Lambert	23 July 1945	Lambert	Extinct 22 October 1999	
Kemsley	12 September 1945	Berry	Extant	Also Baron Kemsley
Marchwood	13 September 1945	Penny	Extant	Also Baron Marchwood
Southwood	1946	Elias	Extinct 10 April 1946	Also Baron Southwood
Cunningham of Hyndhope	1946	Cunningham	Extinct 12 June 1963	Also Baron Cunningham of Hyndhope
Portal of Hungerford	1946	Portal	Extinct 22 April 1971	Also Baron Portal of Hungerford
Alanbrooke	1946	Brooke	Extinct 10 January 2018	Also Baron Alanbrooke
Montgomery of Alamein	1946	Montgomery	Extant	
Gort	8 February 1946	Vereker	Extinct 31 March 1946	Also Viscount Gort, in the Peerage of Ireland
Alexander of Tunis	1 March 1946	Alexander	Extant	Created Earl Alexander of Tunis on 11 March 1952.
Mountbatten of Burma	23 August 1946	Mountbatten	Extant	Created Earl Mountbatten of Burma on 18 October 1947.
Hall	28 October 1946	Hall	Extinct 24 July 1985	—
Jowitt	1947	Jowitt	Extinct 16 August 1957	Created Earl Jowitt on 24 December 1951.
Bruce of Melbourne	18 March 1947	Bruce	Extinct 25 August 1967	—
Keren	1 May 1947	Wavell	Extinct 24 December 1953	Subsidiary title of the Earl Wavell
Hyndley	2 February 1948	Hindley	Extinct 1963	Also Baron Hyndley
Alexander of Hillsborough	1950	Alexander	Extinct 1965	Created Earl Alexander of Hillsborough in 1963.
Ruffside	14 December 1951	Brown	Extinct 5 May 1958	
Stevenage	24 December 1951	Jowitt	Extinct 16 August 1957	Subsidiary title of the Earl Jowitt
Hudson	5 January 1952	Hudson	Extinct 28 August 1963	
Bracken	7 January 1952	Bracken	Extinct 8 August 1958	
Waverley	28 January 1952	Anderson	Extant	
Thurso	10 April 1952	Sinclair	Extant	
Brookeborough	1 July 1952	Brooke	Extant	—
Norwich	5 July 1952	Cooper	Extant	
Woolton	2 July 1953	Marquis	Extant	Also Baron Woolton; created Earl of Woolton on 9 January 1956
Leathers	18 January 1954	Leathers	Extant	Also Baron Leathers
Soulbury	16 July 1954	Ramsbotham	Extant	Also Baron Soulbury
Chandos	9 September 1954	Lyttelton	Extant	Created Baron Lyttelton of Aldershot for life on 19 April 2000.
Simonds	18 October 1954	Simonds	Extinct 28 June 1971	Also Baron Simonds for life and Baron Simonds
Kilmuir	19 October 1954	Maxwell Fyfe	Extinct 27 January 1967	Created Earl of Kilmuir on 20 July 1962.
Malvern	18 March 1955	Huggins	Extinct 2013	
Prestwood	16 December 1955	Attlee	Extant	Subsidiary title of the Earl Attlee
Walberton	9 January 1956	Marquis	Extant	Subsidiary title of the Earl of Woolton
De L'Isle	12 January 1956	Sidney	Extant	Also Baron de L'Isle and Dudley
Crookshank	13 January 1956	Crookshank	Extinct 17 October 1961	
Ingleby	17 January 1956	Peake	Extinct 2008	—
Cilcennin	18 January 1956	Thomas	Extinct 13 July 1960	—
Cherwell	26 June 1956	Lindemann	Extinct 3 July 1957	Also Baron Cherwell
Monckton of Brenchley	11 February 1957	Monckton	Extant	
Tenby	12 February 1957	Lloyd-George	Extant	—
Mackintosh of Halifax	10 July 1957	Mackintosh	Extant	Also Baron Mackintosh of Halifax
Dunrossil	12 November 1959	Morrison	Extant	—
Stuart of Findhorn	20 November 1959	Stuart	Extinct July 2026	—
Rochdale	20 January 1960	Kemp	Extant	Also Baron Rochdale
Slim	15 July 1960	Slim	Extant	
Head	2 August 1960	Head	Extant	
Amory	1 September 1960	Amory	Extinct 19 January 1981	
Boyd of Merton	8 September 1960	Lennox-Boyd	Extant	
Ward of Witley	11 November 1960	Ward	Extinct 15 June 1988	
Eden	12 July 1961	Eden	Extinct 17 August 1985	Subsidiary title of the Earl of Avon
Linley	6 October 1961	Armstrong-Jones	Extant	Subsidiary title of the Earl of Snowdon; created Baron Armstrong-Jones for life on 16 November 1999
Radcliffe	11 July 1962	Radcliffe	Extinct 1 April 1977	Also Baron Radcliffe
Mills	22 August 1962	Mills	Extant	Also Baron Mills
Blakenham	8 November 1963	Hare	Extant	
Eccles	14 January 1964	Eccles	Extant	Also Baron Eccles
Watkinson	26 June 1964	Watkinson	Extinct 19 December 1995	
Muirshiel	16 July 1964	Maclay	Extinct 17 August 1992	
Dilhorne	7 December 1964	Manningham-Buller	Extant	Also Baron Dilhorne
Whitelaw	16 June 1983	Whitelaw	Extinct 1 July 1999	
Tonypandy	11 July 1983	Thomas	Extinct 22 September 1997	—
Macmillan of Ovenden	24 February 1984	Macmillan	Extant	Subsidiary title of the Earl of Stockton
Severn	19 June 1999	Mountbatten-Windsor	Extant	Subsidiary title of the Duke of Edinburgh

== See also ==
- British nobility
- List of viscounts in the peerages of Britain and Ireland
