= Charles Gardiner =

Irish politician

Charles Gardiner (21 February 1720 – 20 November 1769) was an Irish landowner and politician.

He was the son of Luke Gardiner and his wife Anne, daughter of Alexander Stewart and granddaughter of William Stewart, 1st Viscount Mountjoy. He was educated at Trinity College, Dublin. On 20 March 1741 he married Florinda, daughter of Robert Norman.

From 1742 to 1760 he represented Taghmon in the Irish House of Commons. He was sworn of the Irish Privy Council on 15 September 1758.

Gardiner inherited the estates of his mother's family, the Stewarts, following the death of William Stewart, 3rd Viscount Mountjoy and 1st Earl of Blessington, on 14 August 1769. He died later the same year and was succeeded by his eldest son Luke, for whom the Mountjoy title was revived in 1785. The Earldom of Blessington was also revived, in 1816 for Luke's son Charles.

Charles Gardiner's other children included a daughter Anne, later Countess of Clancarty, and William Neville Gardiner, sometime British Ambassador to Poland.

Many of Gardiner's Irish property documents and some maps are now at the National Library of Ireland in the manuscripts section.

Parliament of Ireland
| Preceded by John Bowes; William Hore | Member of Parliament for Taghmon; 1742–1760; With: William Hore 1742–1746; Walter Hore 1746–1760 | Succeeded by Walter Hore; Hon. James Stopford |
