= Lord Boyle (disambiguation) =

Lord Boyle or Baron Boyle may refer to:

In the Peerage of Ireland:

- Baron Boyle of Youghal, created in 1616, later merged with the Earldom of Cork
- Baron Boyle of Broghill, created in 1628, later merged with the Earldom of Orrery
- Baron Boyle of Bandon Bridge, created in 1628, later merged with the Earldom of Cork
- Baron Boyle, created in 1673 with the Viscountcy of Blessington

In the Peerage of Scotland:

- Lord Boyle of Kelburn, created in 1699, later merged with the Earldom of Glasgow
- Lord Boyle of Stewartoun, created in 1703 with the Earldom of Glasgow

In the Peerage of Great Britain:

- Baron Boyle of Marston, created in 1711 for the Earl of Orrery

In the Peerage of the United Kingdom:

- Baron Boyle of Handsworth, created in 1970

As a judicial title:

- David Boyle, Lord Boyle, so styled from 1811 to 1837
