= Murrough Boyle, 1st Viscount Blesington =

Irish peer and official

Murragh Boyle, 1st Viscount Blesington (c.1645–1718) was an Irish peer and member of the Irish House of Lords.

Murrough (or Murragh) Boyle was born in Cork, Ireland, the only surviving son of Michael Boyle, Archbishop of Armagh and his second wife Mary O'Brien, daughter of Dermod O'Brien, 5th Baron Inchiquin. He matriculated at Trinity College, Dublin on 8 August 1662.

He was a Member of Parliament in the Parliament of Ireland for Kilmallock from 1665 to 1666. He was created 1st Viscount Blesington (in the Peerage of Ireland) and 1st Baron Boyle, on 23 August 1673, with a special remainder to the male heirs of his father. He was invested as a Privy Counsellor for Ireland in June 1675. He held the office of Constable of King John's Castle in the city of Limerick between 1679 and 1692 and the office of Governor of Limerick between 1679 and 1692. He was awarded the honorary degree of Doctor of Laws (LL.D.) in 1682. He was appointed a Commissioner of the Great Seal of Ireland on 17 November 1693 and appointed one of the Lord Justices of Ireland in 1696, although he only held this office for a fortnight, and was never elected.

Murrough was the author of a tragedy, entitled "The Lost Princess". Baker, a contemporary dramatic critic, characterised this production as "truly contemptible", and added that the "genius and abilities of the writer did no credit to the name of Boyle".

On his death in Dublin on 26 April 1718 he was buried at St Patrick's Cathedral, Dublin.

He had married twice; firstly Mary Parker, daughter of Dr. John Parker, Archbishop of Dublin and Mary Clarke, and secondly Lady Ann Coote, daughter of Charles Coote, 2nd Earl of Mountrath and Alice Meredyth. By his first wife he had a daughter Mary and by his second a son and heir, Charles and two daughters Alicia and Anne. Alicia married Pierce Butler, 4th Viscount Ikerrin and had one son James who succeeded to his father's title but died young. Anne married William Stewart, 2nd Viscount Mountjoy and was the mother of William Stewart, 1st Earl of Blessington.

His title was inherited by his son Charles Boyle, 2nd Viscount Blesington. On Charles' death without a male heir, his estates passed to his surviving sister Anne.

Peerage of Ireland
New creation	Viscount Blesington; 1673–1718	Succeeded by Charles Boyle
