= Robert Fielding =

English rake (1650/51–1712)

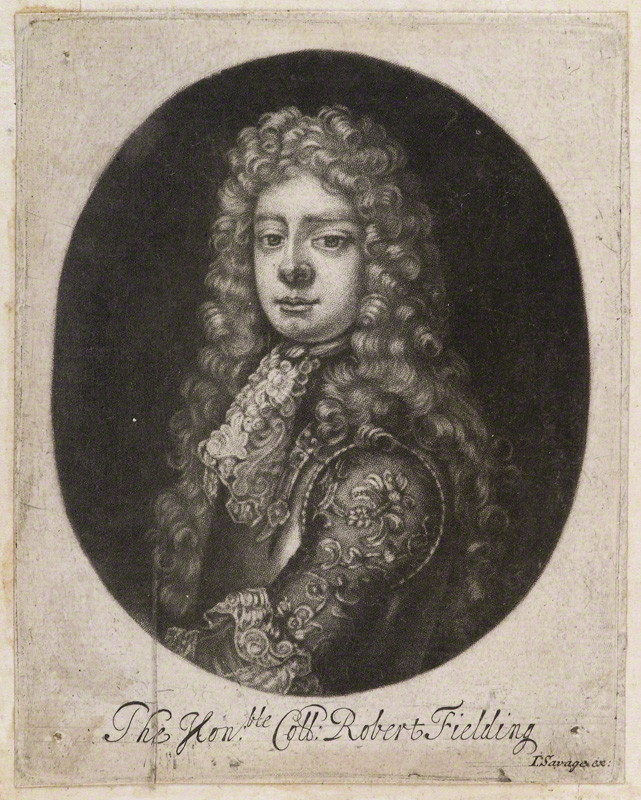
Beau Fielding

Robert Fielding (or Feilding; also nicknamed Beau Fielding; 1650/51 – 12 May 1712) was an English bigamist and rake in the late 17th and early 18th centuries. He was known as a handsome womanizer at the royal court of King Charles II, where he was given the nicknames "Beau" and "Handsome" Fielding, and later became the bigamous husband of the King's former mistress, Barbara Villiers, the first Duchess of Cleveland.

== Early life ==
Fielding was born in Solihull, Warwickshire, to George Fielding, a kinsman of the Earl of Denbigh. There is no record of his mother. A minor reference to his early life and character is found in Jonathan Swift's Miscellaneous and autobiographical pieces, fragments and marginalia, which reports that Fielding married Mary, only daughter and heiress of Barnham Swift, 1st Viscount Carlingford and Lady Mary Crichton. Swift recalls that she "brought him a considerable estatte in Yorkshire, which he squandered away, but had no children". His second wife was the twice-widowed Lady Margaret Burke, only daughter of Ulick Burke, the first Marquess of Clanricarde and Lady Anne Compton.

== Member of Parliament ==
Following the death of Charles II in 1685, Fielding became a loyal supporter of King James II and the Roman Catholic cause. James gave him a regiment of the Royal Irish Army, and while in Ireland, Fielding became an MP for Gowran, County Kilkenny in the 1689 Patriot Parliament in Dublin. With his regiment, he is said to have put down a Protestant riot. After the Glorious Revolution and James' forced abdication, Fielding travelled to Paris with the exiled king, before returning to England, where he was imprisoned in Newgate Prison as a Jacobite in 1696. After securing a pardon the following year, he led an ostentatious lifestyle, leading a life filled with gambling, wealthy mistresses and duels. At the age of 50, Fielding was involved in a duel with a barrister named Fulwood, who drew first and injured his opponent. While Fulwood left triumphantly for Lincoln's Inn Fields in London, Fielding showed his injuries to the public, hoping to arouse some compassion. Instead, as Swift recorded: "[h]e was run into his breast, which he opened, and shewed [sic] to the ladies, that he might move their love and pity; but they all fell a-laughing".

== Scandal ==
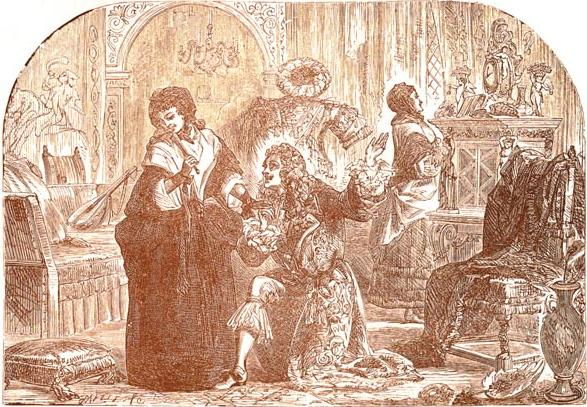
Beau Fielding, proposing to Mary Wadsworth

Following the death of his wife Margaret on 14 August 1698, Fielding courted Barbara, Duchess of Cleveland, former mistress of Charles II. At the same time, he pursued Anne Deleau, an heiress with a fortune of £60,000, which Fielding discovered by studying her late husband's will. Love letters sent to her house in Waddon, Surrey were hidden by the servants, who suspected Fielding's motives for proposing, due to his bad reputation. However, his pursuit continued, and he bribed Deleau's hairdresser, Charlotte Villars, with £500 to arrange the marriage. Mrs. Villars, however, knowing that Deleau would most likely refuse, disguised one of her own friends, a poor woman named Mary Wadsworth, as the widow. Believing her to be Deleau, Fielding married Wadsworth on 9 November 1705. Fielding's pursuit of the Duchess of Cleveland also continued, and he entered into a bigamous union with her on 25 November 1705.

News of the double marriage emerged in May 1706, when Fielding discovered that he had married Wadsworth rather than Deleau. He arrived at Waddon, beat Wadsworth, and warned Deleau's hairdresser Charlotte Villars, who had arranged the deception, not to reveal the marriage. In the meantime, the relations between the Duchess of Cleveland and her husband were increasingly unhappy. After she stopped indulging his expenses, he "so barbarously ill-treated her, that she was obliged to have recourse to a magistrate for protection against his outrages". He also conducted a sexual relationship with the Duchess' granddaughter, Charlotte Calvert, in the Spring of 1706, and was rumoured to have fathered a child by her, born on 23 April 1707. The case went to the Old Bailey, where Fielding was prosecuted and found guilty of bigamy at his trial on 4 December 1706. The marriage between Fielding and the Duchess was annulled, but he claimed benefit of clergy, escaping the sentence for bigamy. He escaped the lesser sentence of being burnt at the hand by producing a warrant from Queen Anne, which ordered the suspension of all sentences against him.

Popular with women, 19th century writer Anna Jameson claimed that Fielding was full of self-love and extravagance, lavishing money on those in his circle. His portrait was painted by three of the great contemporary artists of the time: Peter Lely, Godfrey Kneller and Willem Wissing. After the annulment of his marriage, he became reconciled with Mary Wadsworth, and the couple lived together until his death, from fever, on 12 May 1712. The Duchess of Cleveland had died of dropsy at her home in Chiswick on 9 October 1709.

== Bibliography ==
- Baldick, Robert (1970). The duel: A history of duelling. Taylor & Francis. ISBN 0-600-32837-6.
- Jameson, Anna (1838). Memoirs of the Beauties of the Court of Charles the Second. H. Colburn.
- Feilding, Robert (1708). The Arraignment, Tryal, and Conviction of Robert Feilding, Esq. J. Mount.
- Scott, Walter; Swift, Jonathan (1824). The works of Jonathan Swift, containing additional letters, tracts, and poems, with notes, and a life of the author. London: Constable.
