= Charles Gardiner, 1st Earl of Blessington =

Irish peer

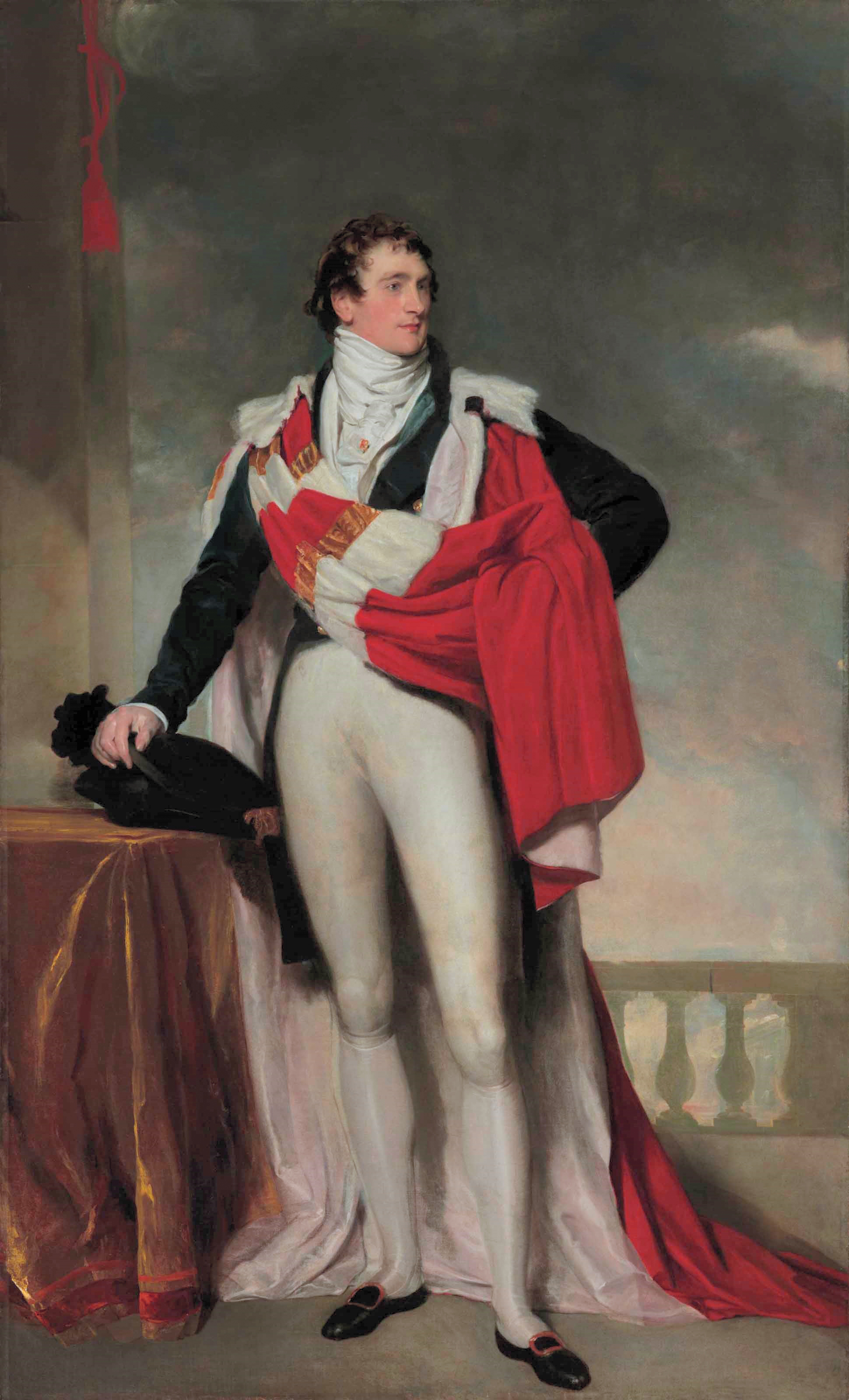
Charles Gardiner, 1st Earl of Blessington (1782-1829), c.1816 by Thomas Lawrence

Charles John Gardiner, 1st Earl of Blessington (1782 – 25 May 1829) was an Irish peer best known for his marriage to Margaret Farmer (née Power), whom he married at St Mary's, Bryanston Square, London, on 16 February 1818 (only four months after her first husband's death). He was elected an Irish representative peer in 1809, created Earl of Blessington in 1816, and inherited the title of Viscount Mountjoy in 1798. He was present at the trial of Queen Caroline.

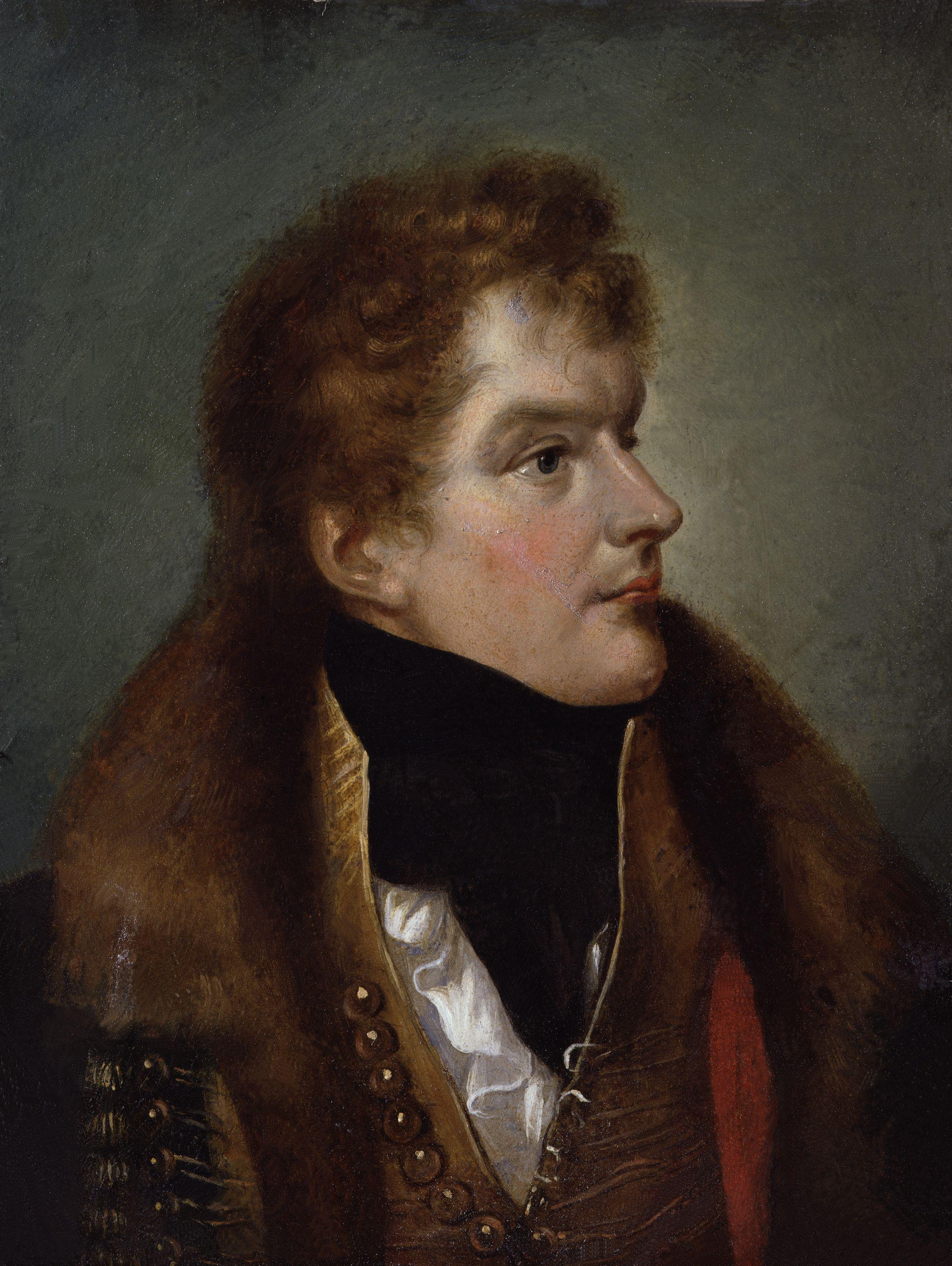
Charles John Gardiner by James Holmes (1777-1860)

After she left her first unhappy marriage, Margaret Power had stayed for almost three years with her parents, then moved to Cahir, in 1809 to Dublin, and from 1809 to 1814 with a Dublin acquaintance, Captain Thomas Jenkins, of the 11th light dragoons, with whom she formed a close relationship. It was during her Hampshire stay that she met Gardiner, 7 years her senior. (Gardiner's first wife died sometime after 1812, having borne him two illegitimate children prior to their marriage and two legitimate children, Lady Harriet Gardiner and Luke Wellington Gardiner, Viscount Mountjoy). Jenkins received £10,000 from Gardiner to cover the jewels and clothing that he had purchased for Margaret, buying his approval for Gardiner's and Power's marriage, after which she changed her name to Marguerite.

After honeymooning in Ireland, they returned to a newly leased town mansion at 10 St. James's Square, London, in 1820. This address (now the base of Chatham House) soon became a social centre, but their heavy spending and extravagant tastes meant that, despite his annual income of £30,000 from his Irish estates, they were soon both heavily in debt. On 25 August 1822 they set out for a continental tour with Marguerite's youngest sister, the twenty-one-year-old Mary Anne, and servants. They met Count D'Orsay (who had first become an intimate of Lady Blessington in London in 1821) in Avignon on 20 November 1822, before settling at Genoa for four months from 31 March 1823. There they met Byron on several occasions, giving Lady Blessington material for her "Conversations with Lord Byron".

After that they settled for the most part in Naples, also spending time in Florence with their friend Walter Savage Landor, author of the "Imaginary Conversations" greatly admired by Lady Blessington. It was in Italy, on 1 December 1827, that Count D'Orsay married Harriet Gardiner to strengthen the tie between himself and her stepmother Lady Blessington. The Blessingtons and the new couple moved to Paris towards the end of 1828, taking up residence in the Hôtel Maréchal Ney, where the Earl suddenly died at age 46 of an apoplectic stroke in 1829.

D'Orsay and his wife then accompanied Lady Blessington to England, but the couple soon separated. D'Orsay lived with Lady Blessington until her death, and she let out the Earl's St James's house.

== Sources ==
- Dictionary of National Biography

Peerage of Ireland
New creation	Earl of Blessington; 1816–1829	Extinct
Preceded by Luke Gardiner	Viscount Mountjoy; 1798–1829	Extinct
Political offices
Preceded by The Marquess of Sligo	Representative peer for Ireland; 1809–1829	Succeeded by The Earl of Glengall
