= James Holmes (artist) =

English painter

James Holmes RBA (1777 – 24 February 1860) was a painter in oil and water colour of genre scenes and miniatures.

James Holmes was at an early age apprenticed to the well-known engraver Robert Mitchell Meadows and in 1800 engraved in stipple a portrait of Rickman after Hazlitt. Holmes was also talented in music, specifically as a flute player; Novello recommended that he pursue a career in music. He began attending the Royal Academy schools in 1796 and first exhibited at the Royal Academy in 1798. From 1798 to 1849 Holmes exhibited 21 paintings at the Royal Academy, including two miniatures (Miss Emma E. Kendrick and Portraits of the infant children of J. Harlop, Esq.) in 1819 and one miniature in 1848. He became a water colourist and in 1813 became a member of the Society of Painters in Water Colours, exhibiting there two of his paintings, Hot Porridge and The Married Man. He continued exhibiting there until 1820. In 1822 he resigned from the Society of Painters in Water Colours, and became in 1824 a founding member of the Society of British Artists, and a frequent exhibitor, chiefly in miniatures, until 1850; he was the president of the Society in 1829. He had a successful practice as a portrait painter in miniature. Two of his miniature portraits of Lord Byron were engraved. Holmes’s portraiture of George IV lead to a personal friendship in which they played music together. Published engravings were done for some of Holmes’s paintings, including The Amulet and The Literary Souvenir. He retired to Shropshire.
