= William Stewart, 2nd Viscount Mountjoy =

Anglo-Irish peer

William Stewart, 2nd Viscount Mountjoy (1675 – 10 January 1728), was an Anglo-Irish peer.

William Stewart was born in 1675, the son of Sir William Stewart, later 1st Viscount Mountjoy. His father was a leader of the Irish Protestants during the early stages of the Williamite War, and had commanded the Royal Irish Army detachment in Derry in 1689. He was later killed at the Battle of Steinkirk.

He married on 23 November 1696 Anne Boyle, the daughter of Murrough Boyle, 1st Viscount Blesington. They had five sons and four daughters.

Viscount Mountjoy was friends with the writer Jonathan Swift and they had a regular card game during the period 1710 to 1713. He was given command of a regiment of foot and was made successively a brigadier-general, a major-general and a lieutenant-general. In 1714 he was made Master-General of the Ordnance, colonel of a regiment of dragoons and soon after one of the Keepers of the Great Seal.

On his death on 10 January 1728, his title passed to his son Sir William Stewart, 3rd Viscount Mountjoy, later (1745) William Stewart, 1st Earl of Blessington.

Peerage of Ireland
Preceded by William Stewart	Viscount Mountjoy; 1692–1728	Succeeded by William Stewart
