= Earl of Blessington =

The title of Earl of Blessington was created twice in the Peerage of Ireland, in 1745 and 1816. Both creations became extinct, in 1769 and 1829 respectively. The earldom was also spelt as Blesington.

Anne Boyle, sister of the last Viscount Blessington, married William Stewart, 2nd Viscount Mountjoy, and their son William, 3rd Viscount Mountjoy, was created Earl of Blessington, in the Peerage of Ireland, on 7 December 1745. This title became extinct on his death on the 14 August 1769.

The Earldom was recreated on 22 January 1816 for Charles John Gardiner, 2nd Viscount Mountjoy, a descendant of the Stewart Viscounts Mountjoy, although not of the Boyle Viscounts Blessington. Gardiner died on 25 May 1829, without surviving male heir and his titles became extinct.

== Earls of Blessington, First Creation (1745) ==
- William Stewart, 1st Earl of Blessington (1709–1769)

== Earls of Blessington, Second Creation (1816) ==
- Charles John Gardiner, 1st Earl of Blessington (1782–1829)
  - Luke Wellington Gardiner, Viscount Mountjoy (1813–1823; predeceased his father)

== Namesake ==
Blessington, historically known as Ballycomeen, is a town on the River Liffey in County Wicklow, Ireland, near the border with County Kildare.

== Secondary sources ==
- Mosley, Charles (2002). Burke's Peerage and Baronetage. Vol. 2 vols (107th ed.).
- Cokayne, George E.; Vicary Gibbs, Peter; Doubleday, Harry; Howard de Walden, Lord David (1958). The Complete Peerage of England, Scotland and Ireland, Great Britain and Northern Ireland, extant, abeyant, dormant and extinct. Vol. XIV vols.
