= Viscount Carlingford =

Viscount Carlingford, in the County of Louth, was a title that was created twice in the Peerage of Ireland. The first creation came in 1627 in favour of Edward Barnham Swift. He was the son of Sir Robert Swift, High Sheriff of Yorkshire from 1599 to 1600 and his wife Ursula Barnham. Lord Carlingford had no sons and the title became extinct on his early death in 1634. By his wife Lady Mary Crichton, daughter of William, 1st Earl of Dumfries, he had one daughter Mary, who married the notorious rake Robert Fielding, but had no children.

The second creation came in 1761 in favour of George Carpenter, 3rd Baron Carpenter. He was made Earl of Tyrconnel at the same time; for more information on this creation, see the latter title.

== Viscounts Carlingford; First creation (1627) ==
- Edward Barnham Swift, 1st Viscount Carlingford (1606–1634)

== Viscounts Carlingford (1761) ==
- see Earl of Tyrconnel

== See also ==
- Earl of Carlingford
- Baron Carlingford
