= Viscount Mountjoy =

Viscountcy in the Peerage of Great Britain

The title of Viscount Mountjoy has been created three times, twice in the Peerage of Ireland and once in the Peerage of Great Britain. The creations in the Peerage of Ireland were made in 1683 and 1795, and became extinct in 1769 and 1829, respectively. The creation in the Peerage of Great Britain occurred in 1796, as a subsidiary title for the Marquess of Bute, to which title it is still attached.

The titles of Viscount Mountjoy and Baron Stewart of Ramelton in the Peerage of Ireland were conferred upon Sir William Stewart, 3rd Baronet, of Ramelton, in 1683. His grandson the 3rd Viscount Mountjoy was created Earl of Blessington in 1745 and died in 1769, when all his peerage titles became extinct (though the baronetcy remains extant). His cousin Anne, daughter of the Hon. Alexander Stewart and granddaughter of the 1st Viscount Mountjoy, married in 1711 Luke Gardiner, who served as Vice-Treasurer of Ireland. Their grandson Luke was created Baron Mountjoy, of Mountjoy in the County of Tyrone, in 1789 and Viscount Mountjoy in 1795, both in the Peerage of Ireland. His son Charles John Gardiner, 2nd Viscount Mountjoy, was created Earl of Blessington, again in the Peerage of Ireland, in 1816. His second wife was the famous Marguerite, Countess of Blessington. He died without male issue in 1829, when all his titles became extinct.

Charlotte Jane Windsor, daughter of the 2nd Viscount Windsor and 2nd Baron Mountjoy, married the 4th Earl of Bute, and that nobleman was created Marquess of Bute, Earl of Windsor and Viscount Mountjoy in the Isle of Wight in 1796, in the Peerage of Great Britain. These titles remain extant.

== Viscounts Mountjoy (1683) ==
- William Stewart, 1st Viscount Mountjoy (1653–1692)
- William Stewart, 2nd Viscount Mountjoy (1675–1728)
- William Stewart, 3rd Viscount Mountjoy (1709–1769), created Earl of Blessington in 1745

== Viscounts Mountjoy (1795) ==
- Luke Gardiner, 1st Viscount Mountjoy (1745–1798)
- Charles John Gardiner, 2nd Viscount Mountjoy (1782–1829), elected an Irish representative peer in 1809, created Earl of Blessington in 1816

== Viscounts Mountjoy (1796) ==
- see Marquess of Bute

== Family tree ==
Earls and Marquesses of Bute, Earls of Dumfries, Earls of Stair, and Earls of Windsor family tree

Lord Crichton of Sanquhar, 1488
William Crichton (d. 1550); 5th Lord Crichton of Sanquhar
Robert Crichton (d. 1561); 6th Lord Crichton of Sanquhar	Edward Crichton (d. 1569); 7th Lord Crichton of Sanquhar	William Crichton
Viscount of Ayr and Lord Sanquhar, 1622; Earl of Dumfries and Lord Crichton of Sanquhar and Cumnock, 1633
James Stuart; 1st Baronet d. 1662	Robert Crichton (d. 1612); 8th Lord Crichton of Sanquhar	William Crichton; 1578–1643; 1st Earl of Dumfries, Viscount of Ayr, Lord Sanquhar, and Lord Crichton of Sanquhar and Cumnock, 9th Lord Crichton of Sanquhar
Baronet Dalrymple of Stair, 1664; Viscount of Stair and Lord Glenluce and Stranraer, 1690
Dugald Stuart; 2nd Baronet d. 1670	William Crichton; 1598–1691; 2nd Earl of Dumfries, Viscount of Ayr, Lord Sanquhar, and Lord Crichton of Sanquhar and Cumnock, 10th Lord Crichton of Sanquhar	James Dalrymple; 1619–1695; 1st Viscount of Stair, Lord Glenluce and Stranraer, and Baronet Dalrymple
Earl of Bute, Viscount of Kingarth, and Lord Mount Stuart, Cumra and Inchmarnock, 1703	Earl of Stair, Viscount of Dalrymple and Lord Newliston, Glenluce and Stranraer, 1703	Baronet of Dalrymple of Killock, 1698
James Stuart; 1661–1710; 1st Earl of Bute, Viscount of Kingarth, and Lord Mount Stuart, Cumra and Inchmarnock	Charles Chricton styled Lord Crichton	John Dalrymple; 1648–1706/1707; 1st Earl of Stair, Viscount of Dalrymple, and Lord Newliston, Glenluce and Stranraer, 2nd Viscount of Stair and Lord Glenluce and Stranraer	James Dalrymple d. 1719; 1st Baronet Dalrymple of Cranstoun [Nova Scotia]
James Stuart d. 1722/1723; 2nd Earl of Bute, Viscount of Kingarth, and Lord Mount Stuart, Cumra and Inchmarnock	John Dalrymple; 1673–1747; 2nd Earl of Stair, Viscount of Dalrymple, and Lord Newliston, Glenluce and Stranraer, 3rd Viscount of Stair and Lord Glenluce and Stranraer	Penelope Crichton; 1682–1741/1742 suo jure 4th Countess of Dumfries, Viscountess of Ayr, Lady of Sanquhar, and Lady Crichton of Sanquhar and Cumnock, 12th Lady Crichton of Sanquhar,	William Dalrymple; 1678–1744	William Crichton d. 1694; 3rd Earl of Dumfries, Viscount of Ayr, Lord Sanquhar, and Lord Crichton of Sanquhar and Cumnock, 11th Lord Crichton of Sanquhar	George Dalrymple; 1680-1745	John Dalrymple d. 1743; 2nd Baronet Dalrymple of Cranstoun
John Stuart; 1713–1792; 3rd Earl of Bute, Viscount of Kingarth, and Lord Mount Stuart, Cumra and Inchmarnock	Elizabeth Crichton Dalrymple	James Dalrymple d. 1760; 3rd Earl of Stair, Viscount of Dalrymple, and Lord Newliston, Glenluce and Stranraer, 4th Viscount of Stair, Lord Glenluce and Stranraer, and Baronet Dalrymple of Stair	William Dalrymple-Crichton; 1699–1768; 5th Earl of Dumfries, Viscount of Stair, Viscount of Ayr, Lord Sanquhar, Lord Crichton of Sanquhar and Cumnock, Lord Glenluce and Stranraer, and Baronet Dalrymple of Stair, 4th Earl of Stair, Viscount Dalrymple, and Lord Newliston, Glenluce and Stranraer, 12th Lord Crichton of Sanquhar	John Dalrymple; 1720–1789; 5th Earl of Stair, Viscount of Dalrymple, and Lord Newliston, Glenluce and Stranraer, 6th Viscount of Stair, and Lord Glenluce and Stranraer	William Dalrymple; 1736–1807	William Dalrymple; 1704–1771; 3rd Baronet Dalrymple of Cranstoun
Marquess of Bute, Earl of Windsor and Viscount Mountjoy (3rd creation), 1796
John Stuart; 1744–1814; 1st Marquess of Bute, 4th Earl of Bute, 1st Earl of Windsor, 4th Viscount of Kingarth, 4th Lord Mount Stuart, Cumra and Inchmarnock	Patrick McDouall-Crichton; 1726–1803; 6th Earl of Dumfries, 6th Viscount of Ayr, 13th Lord Crichton of Sanquhar, 6th Lord Sanquhar, 6th Lord Crichton of Sanquhar and Cumnock	John Dalrymple; 1749–1821; 6th Earl of Stair, 6th Viscount of Stair, 6th Viscount of Dalrymple, 6th Lord Newliston, Glenluce and Stranraer	John Dalrymple-Hamilton-Makgill; 1726–1810; 4th Baronet Dalrymple of Cranstoun
John Stuart; 1767–1794 styled Viscount Mount Stuart	Elizabeth Penelope McDouall-Crichton; 1772–1797	John William Henry Dalrymple; 1784–1840; 7th Earl of Stair, 8th Viscount of Stair, 7th Viscount of Dalrymple, 7th Lord Newliston, Glenluce and Stranraer	John Hamilton Dalrymple; 1771–1853; 8th Earl of Stair, 9th Viscount of Stair, 8th Viscount of Dalrymple, 8th Lord Newliston, Glenluce and Stranraer (1703), 9th Lord Glenluce and Stranraer (1690), 5th Baronet Dalrymple, 9th Baronet Dalrymple of Stair, 1st Baron Oxenfoord of Cranstoun in the County of Edinburgh	North Hamilton Dalrymple; 1776–1864; 9th Earl of Stair, 10th Viscount of Stair, 9th Viscount Dalrymple, 2nd Baron Oxenfoord of Cranstoun, 9th Lord Newliston, Glenluce and Stranraer, 10th Lord Glenluce and Stranraer, 10th Baronet Dalrymple of Stair, 6th Baronet Dalrymple of Cranstoun
John Crichton-Stuart; 1793–1848; 2nd Marquess of Bute, Earl of Windsor, and Viscount Mountjoy, 5th Earl of Bute, Viscount Kingarth, and Lord Mount Stuart, Cumra and Inchmarnock, 7th Earl of Dumfries, Viscount of Ayr, Lord Crichton of Sanquhar and Cumnock, Lord Sanquhar, and Baronet Stuart of Bute, 14th Lord Crichton of Sanquhar, 3rd Baron of Mount Stuart of Wortley, 2nd Baron Cardiff of Cardiff Castle	John Hamilton Dalrymple; 1819–1903; 10th Earl of Stair, Viscount Dalrymple, and Lord Newliston, Glenluce and Stranraer, 11th Viscount of Stair, Lord Glenluce and Stranraer, and Baronet Dalrymple of Stair, 3rd Baron Oxenfoord of Cranstoun, 7th Baronet Dalrymple of Cranstoun
John Patrick Crichton-Stuart; 1847–1900; 3rd Marquess of Bute, Earl of Windsor, Viscount Mountjoy, and Baron Cardiff of Cardiff Castle, 6th Earl of Bute, Viscount Kingarth, and Lord Mount Stuart, 8th Earl of Dumfries, Viscount of Ayr, Lord Crichton of Sanquhar and Cumnock, Lord Sanquhar, and Baronet Stuart of Bute, 15th Lord Crichton of Sanquhar, 4th Baron of Mount Stuart of Wortley, Cumra and Inchmarnock	John Hew North Gustav Henry Hamilton-Dalrymple; 1848–1914; 11th Earl of Stair, Viscount Dalrymple, and Lord Newliston, 12th Viscount of Stair, Lord Glenluce and Stranraer, and Baronet Dalrymple of Stair, 4th Baron Oxenfoord of Cranstoun, Glenluce and Stranraer, 8th Baronet Dalrymple of Cranstoun
John Patrick Crichton-Stuart; 1881–1947; 4th Marquess of Bute, Earl of Windsor, Viscount Mountjoy, and Baron Cardiff of Cardiff Castle, 7th Earl of Bute, Viscount Kingarth, and Lord Mount Stuart, Cumra and Inchmarnock, 9th Earl of Dumfries, Viscount of Ayr, Lord Crichton of Sanquhar and Cumnock, Lord Sanquhar, and Baronet Stuart of Bute, 16th Lord Crichton of Sanquhar, 5th Baron of Mount Stuart of Wortley	John James Hamilton Dalrymple; 1879–1961; 12th Earl of Stair, Viscount Dalrymple, and Lord Newliston, Glenluce and Stranraer, 13th Viscount of Stair, Lord Glenluce and Stranraer, and Baronet Dalrymple of Stair, 5th Baron Oxenfoord of Cranstoun, 9th Baronet Dalrymple of Cranstoun
John Crichton-Stuart; 1907–1956; 5th Marquess of Bute, Earl of Windsor, Viscount Mountjoy, and Baron Cardiff of Cardiff Castle, 10th Earl of Dumfries, Viscount of Ayr, Lord Crichton of Sanquhar and Cumnock, Lord Sanquhar, and Baronet Stuart of Bute, 8th Earl of Bute, 8th Viscount Kingarth and Lord Mount Stuart, Cumra and Inchmarnock, 17th Lord Crichton of Sanquhar, 6th Baron of Mount Stuart of Wortley	John Aymer Dalrymple; 1906–1996; 13th Earl of Stair, Viscount Dalrymple, and Lord Newliston, Glenluce and Stranraer, 14th Viscount of Stair, Lord Glenluce and Stranraer, and Baronet Dalrymple of Stair, 6th Baron Oxenfoord of Cranstoun, 10th Baronet Dalrymple of Cranstoun
John Crichton-Stuart; 1933–1993; 6th Marquess of Bute, 6th Earl of Windsor, 6th Viscount Mountjoy, 6th Baron Cardiff of Cardiff Castle, 9th Earl of Bute, 9th Viscount Kingarth, 9th Lord Mount Stuart, Cumra and Inchmarnock, 11th Earl of Dumfries, 11th Viscount of Ayr, 11th Lord Crichton of Sanquhar and Cumnock, 11th Lord Sanquhar, 11th Baronet Stuart of Bute, 18th Lord Crichton of Sanquhar, 7th Baron of Mount Stuart of Wortley
John Colum Crichton-Stuart; 1958–2021; 7th Marquess of Bute, Earl of Windsor, Viscount Mountjoy, and Baron Cardiff of Cardiff Castle, 10th Earl of Bute, Viscount Kingarth, and Lord Mount Stuart, Cumra and Inchmarnock, 12th Earl of Dumfries, Viscount of Ayr, Lord Crichton of Sanquhar and Cumnock, Lord Sanquhar, and Baronet Stuart of Bute, 19th Lord Crichton of Sanquhar, 8th Baron of Mount Stuart of Wortley	Anthony Crichton-Stuart b. 1961; Heir presumptive to the Marquessate of Bute and Earldoms of Bute and Windsor	John David James Dalrymple b. 1961; 14th Earl of Stair, Viscount Dalrymple, and Lord Newliston, Glenluce and Stranraer, 15th Viscount of Stair, Lord Glenluce and Stranraer, and Baronet Dalrymple of Stair, 7th Baron Oxenfoord of Cranstoun, 11th Baronet Dalrymple of Cranstoun
Caroline Crichton-Stuart b. 1984; Heir presumptive to the Earldom of Dumfries	John Bryson Crichton-Stuart b. 1989; 8th Marquess of Bute, 8th Earl of Windsor, Viscount Mountjoy, and Baron Cardiff of Cardiff Castle, 11th Earl of Bute, Viscount Kingarth, and Lord Mount Stuart, Cumra and Inchmarnock, 13th Earl of Dumfries, Viscount of Ayr, Lord Crichton of Sanquhar and Cumnock, Lord Sanquhar, and Baronet Stuart of Bute, 20th Lord Crichton of Sanquhar, 9th Baron of Mount Stuart of Wortley	Arthur Alec Crichton-Stuart b. 2001	John James Thomas Dalrymple b. 2008 styled Viscount Dalrymple; Heir apparent to the Earldom of Stair

== See also ==
- Baron Mountjoy
- Earl of Blessington
- Marquess of Bute
