= Charles Boyle, 2nd Viscount Blesington =

Irish peer

Charles Boyle, 2nd Viscount Blesington (died 2 June 1732) was an Irish peer and member of the House of Lords.

Charles Boyle was the son of Murrough Boyle, 1st Viscount Blesington and Lady Anne Coote, daughter of Charles Coote, 2nd Earl of Mountrath and Alice Meredyth.

He married twice; firstly Penelope Rose Coote, daughter of his uncle Colonel Hon. Richard Coote and his wife Penelope Hill, and secondly Martha Matthews, daughter of Samuel Matthews and Anne Cuffe. By his second wife, he had a son and heir, Murrough, who died in infancy.

He sat as Member of Parliament for Blessington between 1711 and 1718, when he succeeded in the viscountcy on the death of his father. After his death in Paris he was buried at St Patrick's Cathedral, Dublin and, although his estates passed to his sister Anne, his titles became extinct.

Peerage of Ireland
Preceded by Murrough Boyle	Viscount Blesington; 1718–1732	Extinct
