= William Stewart, 1st Earl of Blessington =

Anglo-Irish peer

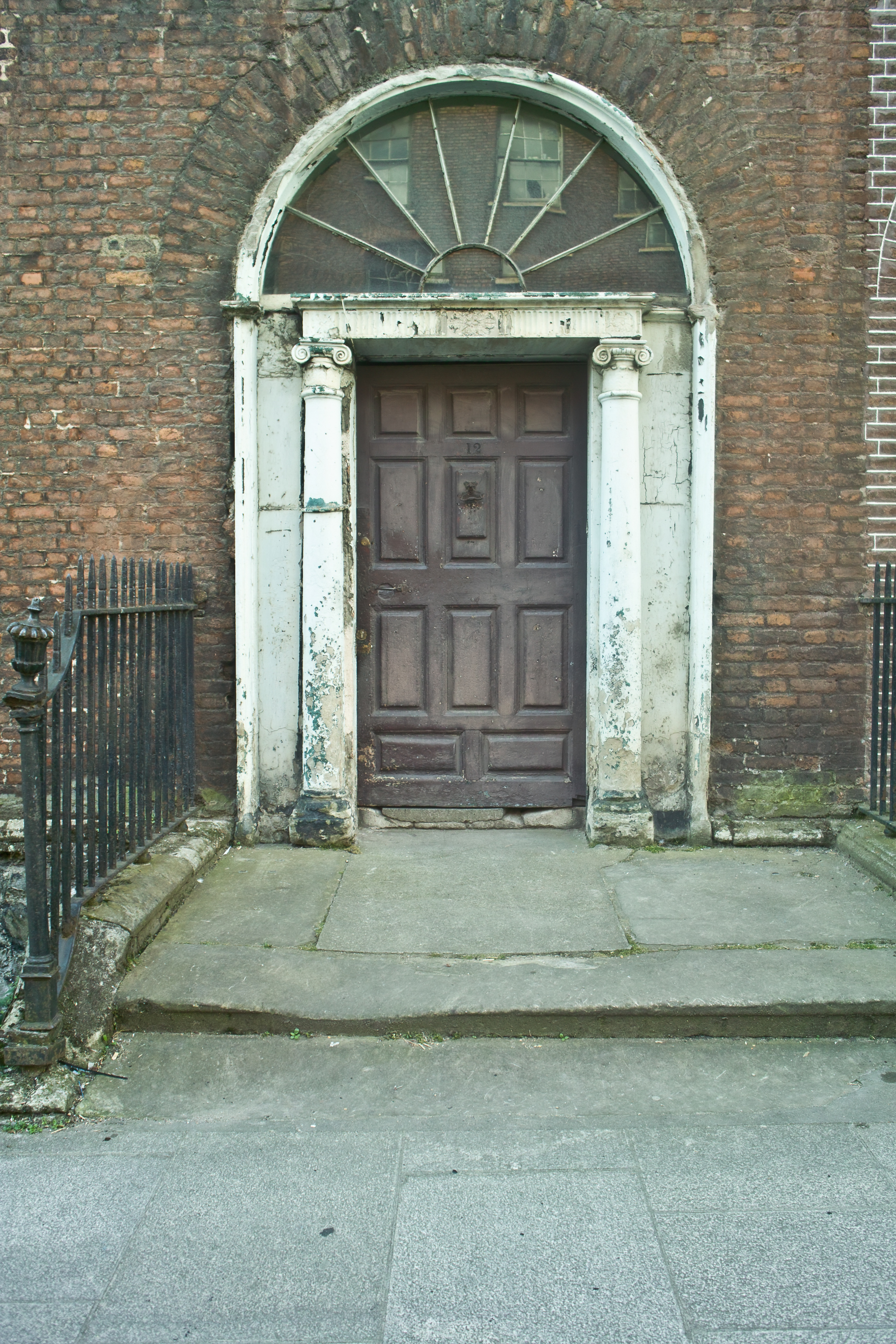
Entrance to Mountjoy's town house 12 Henrietta Street Dublin August 2010

William Stewart, 1st Earl of Blessington (7 April 1709 – 14 August 1769) was an Anglo-Irish peer and member of the House of Lords, styled The Honourable William Stewart until 1728 and known as The Viscount Mountjoy from 1728 to 1745.

== Life ==
Stewart was the son of William Stewart, 2nd Viscount Mountjoy and Anne Boyle. He married Eleanor Fitzgerald, daughter of Robert Fitzgerald, on 10 January 1733. They had two children, William Stewart and Lionel Robert, both of whom died before their father.

He succeeded his father as Viscount Mountjoy on 10 January 1727. He was Grand Master of the Freemasons (in Ireland) between 1738 and 1740. He was created Earl of Blessington on 7 December 1745, his mother having been sister and sole heiress of Charles, 2nd and last Viscount Blesington. He was made Governor of County Tyrone and in 1748, was sworn of the Privy Council of Ireland.

On his death in London on 14 August 1769, he was buried at Silchester in Hampshire. His peerages became extinct, but his baronetcy was inherited by a distant cousin, Sir Annesley Stewart.

Peerage of Ireland
New creation	Earl of Blessington; 1745–1769	Extinct
Preceded by William Stewart	Viscount Mountjoy; 1727–1769	Extinct
Baronetage of Ireland
Preceded by William Stewart	Baronet (of Ramelton); 1727–1769	Succeeded by Annesley Stewart
Masonic offices
Preceded by William Vaughan	Grand Master of the Antient Grand Lodge of England; 1756–1760	Succeeded by The Earl of Kellie
