= Viscount Blesington =

Viscount Blesington, in the County of Wicklow, was a title in the Peerage of Ireland. It was created on 23 August 1673 for Murrough Boyle. He was the son of Michael Boyle, Archbishop of Armagh, eldest son of Richard Boyle, Archbishop of Tuam. He was created Baron Boyle, in the County of Wicklow, at the same time, also in the Peerage of Ireland. Both titles were created with remainder to the heirs male of his father. However, the titles became extinct on the death of his son, Charles, the second Viscount, on 2 June 1732.

Michael Boyle had established a town in County Wicklow, to which he gave the name of Blessington. In connection with this town he in 1673 obtained the title of Viscount Blessington for his eldest son, Murrough. Richard Boyle, Archbishop of Tuam, was the son of Michael Boyle, brother of Roger Boyle, father of Richard Boyle, 1st Earl of Cork (see Earl of Cork for more information on this branch of the family).

== Viscounts Blesington (1673) ==
- Murrough Boyle, 1st Viscount Blesington (1648–1718)
- Charles Boyle, 2nd Viscount Blesington (died 1732)

== See also ==
- Earl of Cork
- Earl of Orrery
- Earl of Shannon
