= Cumberlege =

Cumberlege is a surname. Notable people with this surname include:

- Barry Cumberlege (1891–1970), English rugby union player
- Charles Cumberlege (1851–1929), Indian-born English cricketer
- Claude Cumberlege (1877–1962), British Royal Navy officer, father of Mike
- Julia Cumberlege, Baroness Cumberlege (born 1943), British politician
- Mike Cumberlege (1905–1945), British Royal Navy officer, son of Claude

== See also ==
- Cumberlege Commission, an ecclesiastical commission chaired by Julia Cumberlege
- Cumberlege Report 1986, British report on community nursing chaired by Julia Cumberlege
- Cumberlidge
