= List of former members of the House of Lords (2000–present) =

This is a list of former members of the House of Lords, the upper house of the Parliament of the United Kingdom, who ceased serving after 2000.

== Living ==
Apart from retired Lords Spiritual and the surviving hereditary peers excluded under the House of Lords Act 1999, including the Marquess of Cholmondeley who was exempt from the 1999 Act by virtue of his position as Lord Great Chamberlain until the proclamation of accession of Charles III in September 2022, there are a number of living peers who have permanently ceased to be members of the House.

=== Resigned under the House of Lords Reform Act 2014 ===
Under Section 1 of the House of Lords Reform Act 2014, peers may permanently retire or otherwise resign their membership of the House. The following peers have exercised that right and are still living:

Member of the Privy Council

‡ former MP
# former MEP

Title	Party	Date joined	Resigned	Type	Notes
The Lord Grenfell	Labour	17 April 2000 (Note: Sat as an Hereditary peer: 24 September 1976–11 November 1999.)	1 October 2014	Hereditary peer given a Life Peerage	Sat as Baron Grenfell of Kilvey; Previously retired under the Resolution of the House of 27 June 2011 on 31 March 2014
The Lord Nickson	Crossbencher	22 March 1994	27 March 2015	Life peer	
The Lord Ashcroft, PC	Conservative	20 October 2000	3 April 2015	Life peer	
The Lord Hope of Thornes, PC	Crossbencher	31 March 2005	30 April 2015	Life peer	Archbishop of York (1995–2005)
The Lord Sharman	Liberal Democrat	2 August 1999	30 April 2015	Life peer	
The Lord Edmiston	Conservative	14 January 2011	22 July 2015	Life peer	
The Lord Sewel	Non-affiliated	10 January 1996	30 July 2015	Life peer	Chairman of Committees (2012–2015); Junior Minister
The Lord Simpson of Dunkeld	Labour	5 November 1997	30 July 2015	Life peer	
The Baroness Perry of Southwark	Conservative	16 July 1991	26 May 2016	Life peer	
The Lord Hurd of Westwell, PC ‡	Conservative	13 June 1997	9 June 2016	Life peer	Foreign Secretary (1989–1995); Home Secretary (1985–1989); Cabinet Minister (1984–1985)
The Baroness Sharp of Guildford	Liberal Democrat	1 August 1998	31 July 2016	Life peer	
The Lord Scott of Foscote, PC	Crossbencher	17 July 2000	21 December 2016	Law life peer	Law Lord (2000–2009); Vice-Chancellor (1994–2000)
The Lord Macdonald of Tradeston, PC	Labour	2 October 1998	27 April 2017	Life peer	Cabinet Minister (1999–2003)
The Marquess of Salisbury, PC ‡	Conservative	17 November 1999 (Note: Sat as an Hereditary peer: 29 April 1992–11 November 1999)	8 June 2017	Hereditary peer given a Life Peerage	Sat as Baron Gascoyne-Cecil; Cabinet Minister (1994–1997); Leader of the Conservative Party in the House of Lords (1994–1998)
The Lord Simon of Highbury	Non-affiliated	16 May 1997	9 June 2017	Life peer	
The Earl of Mar and Kellie	Liberal Democrat	19 April 2000 (Note: Sat as an Hereditary peer: 22 December 1993–11 November 1999)	30 June 2017	Hereditary peer given a Life Peerage	Sat as Baron Erskine of Alloa Tower
The Lord Lloyd-Webber	Conservative	18 February 1997	17 October 2017	Life peer	
The Baroness Paisley of Saint George's	DUP	14 June 2006	30 October 2017	Life peer	also The Lady Bannside (2010–2014) also The Dowager Lady Bannside (2014–present)
The Lord Tanlaw	Conservative	21 May 1971	3 November 2017	Life peer	
The Lord Condon	Crossbencher	27 June 2001	21 December 2017	Life peer	Commissioner of the Metropolitan Police (1993–2000)
The Lord MacLaurin of Knebworth	Conservative	18 October 1996	22 December 2017	Life peer	
The Lord Blyth of Rowington	Conservative	24 July 1995	1 January 2018	Life peer	
The Lord Glentoran	Conservative	11 November 1999 (Note: Sat as an Hereditary peer: 22 July 1995–11 November 1999)	1 June 2018	Elected hereditary peer	
The Baroness Richardson of Calow	Crossbencher	3 August 1998	20 December 2018	Life peer	President of the Methodist Conference (1992–1993)
The Lord Mogg	Crossbencher	28 May 2008	14 January 2019	Life peer	
The Lord Cullen of Whitekirk, PC	Crossbencher	17 June 2003	1 February 2019	Life peer	Lord President of the Court of Session (2002–2005); Lord Justice Clerk (1997–2002); Senator of the College of Justice (1986–2005)
The Baroness Gould of Potternewton	Labour	6 October 1993	22 July 2019	Life peer	
The Lord MacGregor of Pulham Market, PC ‡	Conservative	5 July 2001	26 July 2019	Life peer	Cabinet Minister (1985–1994)
The Lord Palumbo	Conservative	4 February 1991	2 September 2019	Life peer	Chairman of Arts Council of Great Britain (1989–1994)
The Lord Vallance of Tummel	Liberal Democrat	22 June 2004	13 January 2020	Life peer	
The Lord Steel of Aikwood, PC ‡	Non-affiliated	6 June 1997	27 March 2020	Life peer	Leader of the Liberal Party (1976–1988); Chief Whip of the Liberal Party (1970–1976)
The Countess of Mar	Crossbencher	11 November 1999 (Note: Sat as an Hereditary peer: 21 April 1975–11 November 1999)	1 May 2020	Elected hereditary peer	
The Baroness Byford	Conservative	15 October 1996	5 May 2020	Life peer	
The Lord Cope of Berkeley, PC ‡	Conservative	4 October 1997	13 May 2020	Life peer	Junior Minister; Chief Whip of the Conservative Party in the House of Lords (2001–2007)
The Lord Woolmer of Leeds ‡	Labour	3 August 1999	26 May 2020	Life peer	
The Lord Luce, PC ‡	Crossbencher	2 October 2000	29 June 2020	Life peer	Lord Chamberlain of the Household (2000–2006); Junior Minister
The Lord Morris of Handsworth	Labour	7 June 2006	21 July 2020	Life peer	General Secretary of the TGWU (1992–2003); President of the Trades Union Congress (2001)
The Lord Jones of Birmingham	Crossbencher	10 July 2007	31 August 2020	Life peer	Junior Minister
The Lord Williams of Oystermouth, PC	Crossbencher	8 January 2013	31 August 2020	Life peer	Archbishop of Canterbury (2002–2012)
The Lord Kirkwood of Kirkhope, PC ‡	Liberal Democrat	10 June 2005	2 September 2020	Life peer	Chief Whip of the Liberal Democrats (1992–1997)
The Lord Ahmed	Non-affiliated	3 August 1998	14 November 2020	Life peer	
The Baroness Wilcox	Conservative	16 January 1996	17 December 2020	Life peer	Junior Minister
The Lord Cavendish of Furness	Conservative	17 May 1990	1 January 2021	Life peer	Junior Minister
The Lord Wilson of Tillyorn	Crossbencher	14 February 1992	12 February 2021	Life peer	Governor of Hong Kong (1987–1992)
The Baroness Tonge ‡	Non-affiliated	23 June 2005	19 February 2021	Life peer	
The Lord Ryder of Wensum, PC ‡	Conservative	22 November 1997	12 April 2021	Life peer	Government Chief Whip (1990–1995)
The Lord Sainsbury of Turville	Labour	3 October 1997	1 July 2021	Life peer	Junior Minister
The Lord Puttnam	Labour	27 October 1997	27 October 2021	Life peer	
The Lord Tyler, PC ‡	Liberal Democrat	15 June 2005	28 October 2021	Life peer	Chief Whip of the Liberal Democrats (1997–2001)
The Baroness Hilton of Eggardon	Labour	14 June 1991	5 November 2021	Life peer	
The Lord Broers	Crossbencher	21 June 2004	17 December 2021	Life peer	Vice-Chancellor of the University of Cambridge (1996–2003)
The Viscount Ridley	Conservative	6 February 2013	17 December 2021	Elected hereditary peer	
The Lord Coe ‡	Conservative	16 May 2000	31 January 2022	Life peer	
The Lord Rotherwick	Conservative	11 November 1999 (Note: Sat as an Hereditary peer: 11 June 1996–11 November 1999)	1 February 2022	Elected hereditary peer	
The Lord Lea of Crondall	Non-affiliated	20 July 1999	7 April 2022	Life peer	Assistant General Secretary of the Trades Union Congress (1978–1999)
The Lord Brabazon of Tara, PC	Conservative	11 November 1999 (Note: Sat as an Hereditary peer: 11 December 1974–11 November 1999)	28 April 2022	Elected hereditary peer	Chairman of Committees (2002–2012); Junior Minister
The Lord Oxburgh	Crossbencher	27 July 1999	28 April 2022	Life peer	
The Lord Moonie ‡	Non-affiliated	22 June 2005	28 April 2022	Life peer	Junior Minister
The Lord Lang of Monkton, PC ‡	Conservative	29 September 1997	30 June 2022	Life peer	Cabinet Minister (1990–1997)
The Lord Vinson	Conservative	7 February 1985	13 July 2022	Life peer	
The Viscount Ullswater, PC	Conservative	25 March 2003 (Note: Sat as an Hereditary peer: 27 March 1949–11 November 1999)	20 July 2022	Elected hereditary peer	Junior Minister; Government Chief Whip in the House of Lords (1993–1994)
The Earl of Listowel	Crossbencher	11 November 1999 (Note: Sat as an Hereditary peer: 12 March 1997–11 November 1999)	21 July 2022	Elected hereditary peer	Sat as Baron Hare in the Peerage of the United Kingdom; his other titles are in the Peerage of Ireland
The Lord Astor of Hever, PC	Conservative	11 November 1999 (Note: Sat as an Hereditary peer: 28 June 1984–11 November 1999)	22 July 2022	Elected hereditary peer	Junior Minister
The Lord Soley ‡	Labour	29 June 2005	19 January 2023	Life peer	Chairman of the Parliamentary Labour Party (1997–2001)
The Baroness Chalker of Wallasey, PC ‡	Conservative	24 April 1992	3 February 2023	Life peer	Junior Minister
The Viscount Falkland	Crossbencher	11 November 1999 (Note: Sat as an Hereditary peer: 16 March 1984–11 November 1999)	21 March 2023	Elected hereditary peer	
The Lord Watson of Richmond	Liberal Democrat	23 July 1999	25 July 2023	Life peer	
The Lord Hylton	Crossbencher	11 November 1999 (Note: Sat as an Hereditary peer: 14 November 1967–11 November 1999)	27 July 2023	Elected hereditary peer	
The Lord Stevenson of Coddenham	Crossbencher	13 July 1999	1 October 2023	Life peer	
The Lord Ribeiro	Conservative	20 December 2010	23 October 2023	Life peer	
The Lord Rodgers of Quarry Bank, PC ‡	Liberal Democrat	12 February 1992	12 December 2023	Life peer	Cabinet Minister (1976–1979); Leader of the Liberal Democrats in the House of Lords (1997–2001)
The Lord Plant of Highfield	Labour	24 July 1992	28 February 2024	Life peer	
The Lord Goodlad, PC ‡	Conservative	19 July 2005	29 February 2024	Life peer	Government Chief Whip (1995–1997)
The Lord Bamford	Conservative	3 October 2013	1 March 2024	Life peer	
The Lord Saville of Newdigate, PC	Crossbencher	28 July 1997	20 June 2024	Law life peer	Justice of the Supreme Court of the United Kingdom (2009–2010); Law Lord (1997–2009)
The Lord Rana	Conservative	16 June 2004	2 July 2024	Life peer	
The Lord MacKenzie of Culkein	Labour	4 August 1999	8 July 2024	Life peer	General Secretary of the COHSE (1987–1993); President of the Trades Union Congress (1999)
The Baroness King of Bow ‡	Labour	26 January 2011	9 July 2024	Life peer	
The Baroness Jolly	Liberal Democrat	24 December 2010	31 July 2024	Life peer	Junior Minister
The Lord Warner, PC	Crossbencher	29 July 1998	1 August 2024	Life peer	Civil Servant; Junior Minister
The Lord Owen, PC ‡	Ind. Social Democrat	30 June 1992	13 August 2024	Life peer	Foreign Secretary (1976–1979); Leader of the SDP (1983–1987); Leader of the SDP (1988–1990)
The Lord Levene of Portsoken	Crossbencher	22 July 1997	28 November 2024	Life peer	
The Baroness Cohen of Pimlico	Labour	3 May 2000	19 December 2024	Life peer	
The Baroness Quin, PC ‡ #	Labour	30 May 2006	19 December 2024	Life peer	Junior Minister
The Baroness Cumberlege	Conservative	18 May 1990	20 December 2024	Life peer	Junior Minister
The Baroness Smith of Gilmorehill	Labour	17 February 1995	28 February 2025	Life peer	
The Lord Carter of Barnes	Non-affiliated	15 October 2008	28 March 2025	Life peer	Junior Minister
The Viscount Waverley	Crossbencher	11 November 1999 (Note: Sat as an Hereditary peer: 21 February 1990–11 November 1999)	23 June 2025	Elected hereditary peer	
The Lord Glendonbrook	Conservative	1 February 2011	24 July 2025	Life peer	
The Baroness Bryan of Partick	Labour	20 June 2018	25 July 2025	Life peer	
The Lord Aberdare	Crossbencher	15 July 2009	31 August 2025	Elected hereditary peer	
The Baroness Meacher	Crossbencher	16 June 2006	28 October 2025	Life peer	also The Lady Layard (2000–present)
The Baroness Stern	Crossbencher	13 July 1999	2 December 2025	Life peer	
The Lord Stone of Blackheath	Non-affiliated	29 October 1997	5 December 2025	Life peer	
The Lord Hodgson of Astley Abbotts ‡	Conservative	7 June 2000	12 December 2025	Life peer	
The Baroness Ford	Crossbencher	5 June 2006	18 December 2025	Life peer	
The Lord Offord of Garvel	Reform UK	13 October 2021	30 January 2026	Life peer	Junior Minister
The Lord Mandelson, PC ‡	Non-affiliated	13 October 2008	4 February 2026	Life peer	Cabinet Minister (1997–1998, 1999–2001, 2008–2010); European Commissioner (2004–2008)
The Lord Browne of Ladyton, PC ‡	Labour	22 July 2010	23 February 2026	Life peer	Defence Secretary (2006–2008); Cabinet Minister (2005–2006, 2007–2008)
The Earl Attlee	Conservative	11 November 1999 (Note: Sat as an Hereditary peer: 27 July 1991–11 November 1999)	26 February 2026	Elected hereditary peer	Junior Minister
The Lord Turnberg	Labour	4 May 2000	1 March 2026	Life peer	
The Lord Dykes ‡	Crossbencher	21 June 2004	2 March 2026	Life peer	
The Lord Chadlington	Conservative	16 October 1996	7 March 2026	Life peer	
The Lord Suri	Conservative	11 September 2014	9 March 2026	Life peer	
The Lord Dunlop	Conservative	26 May 2015	27 March 2026	Life peer	Junior Minister
The Lord Trefgarne, PC	Conservative	11 November 1999 (Note: Sat as an Hereditary peer: 29 June 1962–11 November 1999.)	27 March 2026	Elected hereditary peer	Junior Minister
The Lord St John of Bletso	Crossbencher	11 November 1999 (Note: Sat as an Hereditary peer: 11 February 1978–11 November 1999.)	27 March 2026	Elected hereditary peer	
The Earl of Lytton	Crossbencher	11 May 2011 (Note: Sat as an Hereditary peer: 18 January 1985–11 November 1999.)	28 March 2026	Elected hereditary peer	
The Lord Bragg	Labour	4 August 1998	31 March 2026	Life peer	
The Lord Palumbo of Southwark	Liberal Democrat	2 October 2013	1 April 2026	Life peer	
The Earl of Liverpool	Conservative	11 November 1999 (Note: Sat as an Hereditary peer: 13 March 1969–11 November 1999.)	17 April 2026	Elected hereditary peer	
The Lord Clarke of Hampstead	Labour	29 July 1998	17 April 2026	Life peer	Deputy General Secretary of the UCW (1982–1993)
The Lord Cunningham of Felling, PC	Labour	27 June 2005	20 April 2026	Life peer	Cabinet Minister (1997–1999)
The Lord Fellowes of West Stafford	Conservative	12 January 2011	28 April 2026	Life peer	
The Lord Curry of Kirkharle	Crossbencher	13 October 2011	30 April 2026	Life peer	
The Baroness Lea of Lymm	Conservative	31 October 2022	30 April 2026	Life peer	
The Baroness Eccles of Moulton	Conservative	10 May 1990	30 April 2026	Life peer	also The Viscountess Eccles (1999–present)
The Baroness Burt of Solihull ‡	Liberal Democrat	9 October 2015	7 May 2026	Life peer	
The Lord Irvine of Lairg, PC	Labour	25 March 1987	11 May 2026	Life peer	Lord High Chancellor of Great Britain (1997–2003)
The Lord Low of Dalston	Crossbencher	13 June 2006	15 May 2026	Life peer	
The Lord Collins of Mapesbury, PC	Crossbencher	21 April 2009	18 May 2026	Law life peer	Justice of the Supreme Court of the United Kingdom (2009–2011); Law Lord (2009)
The Baroness Clark of Kilwinning ‡	Labour	3 September 2020	19 May 2026	Life peer	
The Lord Haskel	Labour	4 October 1993	21 May 2026	Life peer	
The Lord Hennessy of Nympsfield	Crossbencher	8 November 2010	25 June 2026	Life peer	
The Lord Oakeshott of Seagrove Bay	Non-affiliated	1 May 2000	16 July 2026	Life peer	
The Lord Jopling, PC	Conservative	5 June 1997	24 July 2026	Life peer	Cabinet Minister (1983–1987); Government Chief Whip (1979–1983)
The Lord Wilson of Dinton	Crossbencher	18 November 2002	6 September 2026	Life peer	Cabinet Secretary (1998–2002)
The Lord Shipley	Liberal Democrat	14 July 2010	31 October 2026	Life peer	

==== Future resignations ====
Title	Party	Date joined	Resigning	Type	Notes
The Lord Burnett	Liberal Democrat	31 May 2006	9 December 2026	Life peer	

=== Removed for non-attendance under the House of Lords Reform Act 2014 ===
Under Section 2 of the House of Lords Reform Act 2014, peers who fail to attend any sittings of the House during a whole parliamentary session cease to be members of the House at the start of the next session. The following peers have been subject to this provision since the Act came into force and are still living:

Member of the Privy Council

‡ former MP
# former MEP

Title	Party	Date joined	Removed	Type	Notes
The Lord Dixon-Smith	Conservative	11 October 1993	7 November 2023	Life peer	
The Lord Black of Crossharbour	Non-affiliated	30 October 2001	9 July 2024	Life peer	
The Baroness Corston, PC ‡	Labour	29 June 2005	9 July 2024	Life peer	Chairman of the Parliamentary Labour Party (2001–2005)
The Lord Willoughby de Broke	Non-affiliated	11 November 1999 (Note: Sat as an Hereditary peer: 25 May 1986–11 November 1999)	9 July 2024	Elected hereditary peer	
The Baroness Billingham #	Labour	2 May 2000	13 May 2026	Life peer	

=== Resigned under the Constitutional Reform and Governance Act 2010 ===
Under Section 41 of the Constitutional Reform and Governance Act 2010, peers are automatically and compulsorily treated as domiciled in the United Kingdom for tax purposes. Section 42 allowed peers who did not wish to comply with the provision to choose within three months of the act coming into force to give notice with the same effect as to resign and retire from the House of Lords. The following peers opted to exercise that right and are still living:

Title	Party	Date joined	Resigned	Type	Notes
The Lord Laidlaw	Conservative	14 June 2004	15 April 2010	Life peer	Retains tax residency (domicile) in Monaco
The Baroness Dunn	Crossbencher	24 August 1990	30 June 2010	Life peer	Retains tax residency (domicile) in Hong Kong (Special Administrative Region of China)
The Lord Foster of Thames Bank	Crossbencher	19 July 1999	6 July 2010	Life peer	Retains tax residency (domicile) in Switzerland

=== Peers excluded by the House of Lords (Hereditary Peers) Act 2026 ===
Section 1 of the House of Lords (Hereditary Peers) Act 2026 abolished the right of hereditary peers to sit and vote in the House, effective from the end of the 2024–26 session. This list includes peers who ceased to be members under this Act: 26 excluded hereditary peers included in this list later returned as life peers, but 3 excluded hereditary peers was created life peers before 29 April 2026.
‡ former MP
# former MEP
§ returned to the House as a Life Peer under the 2025 political peerages and May 2026 political peerages

Member of the Privy Council

Title	Party	Date joined	Excluded	Type	Notes
The Lord Addington §	Liberal Democrat	11 November 1999 (Note: Sat as an Hereditary peer: 26 June 1982–11 November 1999)	29 April 2026	Elected hereditary peer	
The Lord Altrincham §	Conservative	23 June 2021	29 April 2026	Elected hereditary peer	
The Earl of Arran	Conservative	11 November 1999 (Note: Sat as an Hereditary peer: 23 February 1983–11 November 1999)	29 April 2026	Elected hereditary peer	Sat as Baron Sudley in the Peerage of the United Kingdom; his other titles are in the Peerage of Ireland; Junior Minister
The Lord Ashcombe §	Conservative	28 October 2022	29 April 2026	Elected hereditary peer	
The Lord Ashton of Hyde, PC	Crossbencher	25 July 2011	29 April 2026	Elected hereditary peer	Master of the Horse (2024–present); Junior Minister; Government Chief Whip in the House of Lords (2019–2022)
The Viscount Astor	Conservative	11 November 1999 (Note: Sat as an Hereditary peer: 7 March 1966–11 November 1999)	29 April 2026	Elected hereditary peer	Junior Minister
The Lord Bethell	Conservative	19 July 2018	29 April 2026	Elected hereditary peer	Junior Minister
The Lord Borwick	Conservative	26 July 2013	29 April 2026	Elected hereditary peer	
The Viscount Brookeborough	Crossbencher	11 November 1999 (Note: Sat as an Hereditary peer: 5 March 1987–11 November 1999)	29 April 2026	Elected hereditary peer	
The Earl of Caithness, PC	Conservative	11 November 1999 (Note: Sat as an Hereditary peer: 8 May 1969–11 November 1999)	29 April 2026	Elected hereditary peer	Junior Minister
The Lord Camoys §	Conservative	28 November 2023	29 April 2026	Elected hereditary peer	
The Viscount Camrose §	Conservative	6 April 2022	29 April 2026	Elected hereditary peer	Junior Minister
The Lord Carrington	Crossbencher	4 December 2018	29 April 2026	Elected hereditary peer	Lord Great Chamberlain (2022–present)
The Earl Cathcart	Conservative	9 March 2007 (Note: Sat as an Hereditary peer: 15 June 1999–11 November 1999)	29 April 2026	Elected hereditary peer	
The Earl of Clancarty §	Crossbencher	28 June 2010 (Note: Sat as an Hereditary peer: 29 March 1996–11 November 1999)	29 April 2026	Elected hereditary peer	Sat as Viscount Clancarty in the Peerage of the United Kingdom; his other titles are in the Peerage of Ireland
The Lord Colgrain	Conservative	27 March 2017	29 April 2026	Elected hereditary peer	
The Viscount Colville of Culross §	Crossbencher	25 July 2011	29 April 2026	Elected hereditary peer	
The Earl of Cork and Orrery	Crossbencher	19 July 2016	29 April 2026	Elected hereditary peer	Sat as Baron Boyle of Marston, in the Peerage of Great Britain; his senior titles are in the Peerage of Ireland
The Earl of Courtown §	Conservative	11 November 1999 (Note: Sat as an Hereditary peer: 23 July 1975–11 November 1999)	29 April 2026	Elected hereditary peer	Sat as Baron Saltersford, in the Peerage of Great Britain; his other titles are in the Peerage of Ireland; Junior Minister
The Lord Crathorne	Conservative	11 November 1999 (Note: Sat as an Hereditary peer: 26 March 1977–11 November 1999)	29 April 2026	Elected hereditary peer	
The Lord Cromwell §	Crossbencher	10 April 2014 (Note: Sat as an Hereditary peer: 18 August 1982–11 November 1999)	29 April 2026	Elected hereditary peer	
The Lord de Clifford	Crossbencher	26 September 2023	29 April 2026	Elected hereditary peer	
The Lord de Mauley §	Conservative	15 March 2005	29 April 2026	Elected hereditary peer	Master of the Horse (2019–2024); Junior Minister
The Earl of Devon	Crossbencher	12 July 2018	29 April 2026	Elected hereditary peer	
The Earl of Dundee	Conservative	11 November 1999 (Note: Sat as an Hereditary peer: 29 June 1983–11 November 1999)	29 April 2026	Elected hereditary peer	Junior Minister
The Viscount Eccles	Conservative	24 March 2005 (Note: Sat as an Hereditary peer: 24 February 1999–11 November 1999)	29 April 2026	Elected hereditary peer	
The Earl of Effingham §	Conservative	28 October 2022	29 April 2026	Elected hereditary peer	
The Earl of Erroll	Crossbencher	11 November 1999 (Note: Sat as an Hereditary peer: 16 May 1978–11 November 1999)	29 April 2026	Elected hereditary peer	Lord High Constable of Scotland (1978–present)
The Lord Fairfax of Cameron	Conservative	26 November 2015 (Note: Sat as an Hereditary peer: 8 April 1964–11 November 1999)	29 April 2026	Elected hereditary peer	
The Lord Freyberg	Crossbencher	11 November 1999 (Note: Sat as an Hereditary peer: 26 May 1993–11 November 1999)	29 April 2026	Elected hereditary peer	
The Lord Geddes	Conservative	11 November 1999 (Note: Sat as an Hereditary peer: 2 February 1975–11 November 1999)	29 April 2026	Elected hereditary peer	
The Earl of Glasgow	Liberal Democrat	17 January 2005 (Note: Sat as an Hereditary peer: 8 June 1984–11 November 1999)	29 April 2026	Elected hereditary peer	
The Lord Glenarthur	Conservative	11 November 1999 (Note: Sat as an Hereditary peer: 19 May 1976–11 November 1999)	29 April 2026	Elected hereditary peer	Junior Minister
The Viscount Goschen §	Conservative	11 November 1999 (Note: Sat as an Hereditary peer: 22 March 1977–11 November 1999)	29 April 2026	Elected hereditary peer	Junior Minister
The Lord Grantchester §	Labour Party	31 October 2003 (Note: Sat as an Hereditary peer: 27 November 1995–11 November 1999)	29 April 2026	Elected hereditary peer	
The Lord Greenway	Crossbencher	11 November 1999 (Note: Sat as an Hereditary peer: 14 September 1975–11 November 1999)	29 April 2026	Elected hereditary peer	
The Lord Hacking	Labour Party	19 November 2021 (Note: Sat as an Hereditary peer: 7 November 1971–11 November 1999)	29 April 2026	Elected hereditary peer	
The Lord Hampton §	Crossbencher	25 October 2022	29 April 2026	Elected hereditary peer	
The Viscount Hanworth	Labour Party	30 March 2011 (Note: Sat as an Hereditary peer: 31 August 1996–11 November 1999)	29 April 2026	Elected hereditary peer	
The Lord Harlech §	Conservative	21 July 2021	29 April 2026	Elected hereditary peer	Junior Minister
The Lord Henley, PC	Conservative	11 November 1999 (Note: Sat as an Hereditary peer: 20 December 1977–11 November 1999)	29 April 2026	Elected hereditary peer	Sat as Baron Northington, in the Peerage of the United Kingdom; his other titles are in the Peerage of Ireland; Junior Minister
The Earl Howe, PC §	Conservative	11 November 1999 (Note: Sat as an Hereditary peer: 29 May 1984–11 November 1999)	29 April 2026	Elected hereditary peer	Junior Minister
The Lord Inglewood #	Crossbencher	11 November 1999 (Note: Sat as an Hereditary peer: 22 June 1989–11 November 1999)	29 April 2026	Elected hereditary peer	Junior Minister
The Earl of Kinnoull §	Crossbencher	3 February 2015	29 April 2026	Elected hereditary peer	Convenor of the Crossbench Peers (2023–present)
The Earl of Leicester	Conservative	23 June 2021	29 April 2026	Elected hereditary peer	
The Lord Londesborough §	Crossbencher	23 June 2021 (Note: Sat as an Hereditary peer: 5 April 1968–11 November 1999)	29 April 2026	Elected hereditary peer	
The Lord Lucas and Dingwall	Conservative	11 November 1999 (Note: Sat as an Hereditary peer: 31 December 1991–11 November 1999)	29 April 2026	Elected hereditary peer	
The Lord Mancroft	Conservative	11 November 1999 (Note: Sat as an Hereditary peer: 14 September 1987–11 November 1999)	29 April 2026	Elected hereditary peer	
The Lord Meston	Crossbencher	26 September 2023 (Note: Sat as an Hereditary peer: 2 January 1984–11 November 1999)	29 April 2026	Elected hereditary peer	
The Earl of Minto §	Conservative	25 October 2022	29 April 2026	Elected hereditary peer	Junior Minister
The Duke of Montrose	Conservative	11 November 1999 (Note: Sat as an Hereditary peer: 10 February 1992–11 November 1999)	29 April 2026	Elected hereditary peer	
The Lord Mountevans	Crossbencher	8 July 2015	29 April 2026	Elected hereditary peer	
The Lord Moynihan ‡ §	Conservative	11 November 1999 (Note: Sat as an Hereditary peer: 30 April 1997–11 November 1999)	29 April 2026	Elected hereditary peer	Junior Minister
The Duke of Norfolk	Crossbencher	14 February 2003	29 April 2026	Hereditary peer	Earl Marshal (2002–present)
The Lord Northbrook	Non-affiliated	11 November 1999 (Note: Sat as an Hereditary peer: 4 December 1990–11 November 1999)	29 April 2026	Elected hereditary peer	
The Earl of Oxford and Asquith	Crossbencher	24 October 2014	29 April 2026	Elected hereditary peer	
The Earl Peel, PC	Crossbencher	11 November 1999 (Note: Sat as an Hereditary peer: 22 September 1969–11 November 1999)	29 April 2026	Elected hereditary peer	Lord Chamberlain of the Household (2006–2021)
The Lord Ravensdale §	Crossbencher	3 April 2019	29 April 2026	Elected hereditary peer	
The Lord Reay §	Conservative	28 January 2019	29 April 2026	Elected hereditary peer	
The Lord Remnant	Conservative	11 July 2022	29 April 2026	Elected hereditary peer	
The Lord Roborough §	Conservative	25 October 2022	29 April 2026	Elected hereditary peer	Junior Minister
The Earl of Rosslyn	Crossbencher	11 November 1999 (Note: Sat as an Hereditary peer: 22 November 1977–11 November 1999)	29 April 2026	Elected hereditary peer	Lord Steward of the Household (2023–present)
The Earl Russell §	Liberal Democrat	13 June 2023	29 April 2026	Elected hereditary peer	
The Lord Russell of Liverpool §	Crossbencher	11 December 2014 (Note: Sat as an Hereditary peer: 8 April 1981–11 November 1999)	29 April 2026	Elected hereditary peer	
The Lord Sandhurst	Conservative	23 June 2021	29 April 2026	Elected hereditary peer	
The Earl of Shrewsbury, Talbot and Waterford	Conservative	11 November 1999 (Note: Sat as an Hereditary peer: 12 November 1980–11 November 1999)	29 April 2026	Elected hereditary peer	Lord High Steward of Ireland (1980–present)
The Duke of Somerset	Crossbencher	12 December 2014 (Note: Sat as an Hereditary peer: 15 November 1984–11 November 1999)	29 April 2026	Elected hereditary peer	
The Earl of Stair	Crossbencher	29 May 2008 (Note: Sat as an Hereditary peer: 26 February 1996–11 November 1999)	29 April 2026	Elected hereditary peer	
The Viscount Stansgate §	Labour Party	15 July 2021	29 April 2026	Elected hereditary peer	
The Lord Strathcarron	Non-affiliated	18 February 2022	29 April 2026	Elected hereditary peer	
The Lord Strathclyde, PC §	Conservative	11 November 1999 (Note: Sat as an Hereditary peer: 12 July 1985–11 November 1999)	29 April 2026	Elected hereditary peer	Cabinet Minister (2010–2013); Leader of the Conservative Party in the House of Lords (1998–2013); Junior Minister; Government Chief Whip in the House of Lords (1994–1997)
The Lord Thurlow	Crossbencher	6 February 2015	29 April 2026	Elected hereditary peer	
The Viscount Thurso, PC ‡	Liberal Democrat	20 April 2016 (Note: Sat as an Hereditary peer: 29 April 1995–11 November 1999)	29 April 2026	Elected hereditary peer	
The Viscount Trenchard	Conservative	17 May 2004 (Note: Sat as an Hereditary peer: 29 April 1987–11 November 1999)	29 April 2026	Elected hereditary peer	
The Lord Trevethin and Oaksey	Crossbencher	22 October 2015	29 April 2026	Elected hereditary peer	
The Lord Vaux of Harrowden §	Crossbencher	11 August 2017	29 April 2026	Elected hereditary peer	
The Duke of Wellington # §	Crossbencher	17 September 2015	29 April 2026	Elected hereditary peer	
The Lord Wrottesley	Conservative	11 July 2022 (Note: Sat as an Hereditary peer: 23 October 1977–11 November 1999)	29 April 2026	Elected hereditary peer	
The Viscount Younger of Leckie	Conservative	28 June 2010	29 April 2026	Elected hereditary peer	Junior Minister

=== Former Lords Spiritual ===
Twenty-six bishops of the Church of England sit in the House of Lords: the Archbishops of Canterbury and of York, the Bishops of London, of Durham and of Winchester, and the next 21 most senior diocesan bishops (with the exception of the Bishop in Europe and the Bishop of Sodor and Man). Under the Lords Spiritual (Women) Act 2015, until May 2030, female bishops take precedence over men to become new Lords Spiritual for the 21 seats allocated by seniority. All bishops are required to retire at the age of 70.

==== Lords Spiritual ex officio ====
Member of the Privy Council

Bishopric	Bishop	Resigned	Introduced	Notes
Lord Archbishop of Canterbury	George Carey, PC	31 October 2002	24 April 1991	Created a Life peer in 2002.
Lord Archbishop of Canterbury	Rowan Williams, PC	31 December 2012	12 March 2003	Created a Life peer in 2013.
Lord Archbishop of Canterbury	Justin Welby, GCVO, PC	6 January 2025	26 February 2013	Translated from Durham: 12 January 2012
Lord Archbishop of York	David Hope, KCVO, PC	28 February 2005	29 January 1996	Created a Life peer in 2005.
Lord Archbishop of York	David Hope, KCVO, PC	28 February 2005	29 January 1996	Translated from London: 27 November 1991
Lord Archbishop of York	David Hope, KCVO, PC	28 February 2005	29 January 1996	Translated from Wakefield: 19 December 1990
Lord Archbishop of York	John Sentamu, PC	7 June 2020	25 January 2006	Created a Life peer in 2021.
Lord Bishop of London	Richard Chartres, GCVO, PC	31 March 2017	22 January 1996	Created a Life peer in 2017.
Lord Bishop of Durham	Michael Turnbull, CBE	30 April 2003	29 November 1994	
Lord Bishop of Durham	N. T. Wright	31 August 2010	5 November 2003	
Lord Bishop of Durham	Paul Butler	29 February 2024	3 March 2014	
Lord Bishop of Winchester	Tim Dakin	6 February 2022	26 March 2012	

==== Lords Spiritual by virtue of seniority of service ====
Bishopric	Bishop	Resigned	Introduced	Notes
Lord Bishop of Bath and Wells	Peter Price	30 June 2013	18 November 2008	
Lord Bishop of Birmingham	David Urquhart, KCMG	18 October 2022	26 October 2010	Convenor of the Lords Spiritual (2015–2022)
Lord Bishop of Blackburn	Alan Chesters, CBE	31 August 2003	12 December 1995	
Lord Bishop of Blackburn	Nicholas Reade	31 October 2012	22 October 2009	
Lord Bishop of Blackburn	Julian Henderson	31 August 2022	6 February 2020	
Lord Bishop of Bradford	David James	14 July 2010	23 March 2009	
Lord Bishop of Bristol	Barry Rogerson	30 November 2002	2 May 1990	
Lord Bishop of Bristol	Mike Hill	30 September 2017	16 July 2009	
Lord Bishop of Bristol	Vivienne Faull	1 September 2025	23 October 2018	
Lord Bishop of Carlisle	Graham Dow	30 April 2009	8 November 2007	
Lord Bishop of Carlisle	James Newcome, KCVO	31 August 2023	23 October 2013	
Lord Bishop of Chelmsford	John Perry	30 June 2003	5 July 2000	
Lord Bishop of Chelmsford	John Gladwin	31 August 2009	16 December 2003	Translated from Guildford: 26 October 1999
Lord Bishop of Chester	Peter Forster	30 September 2019	14 November 2001	
Lord Bishop of Chichester	John Hind	30 April 2012	13 March 2008	
Lord Bishop of Chichester	Martin Warner	30 May 2026	15 January 2018	
Lord Bishop of Coventry	Christopher Cocksworth	6 November 2023	15 January 2013	
Lord Bishop of Derby	Alastair Redfern	31 August 2018	15 June 2010	
Lord Bishop of Ely				
Lord Bishop of Exeter	Michael Langrish	31 August 2013	17 October 2005	
Lord Bishop of Exeter	Robert Atwell	30 September 2023	15 November 2021	
Lord Bishop of Gloucester				
Lord Bishop of Guildford	Christopher Hill, KCVO	30 November 2013	27 May 2010	
Lord Bishop of Hereford	John Oliver	30 November 2003	22 January 1997	
Lord Bishop of Hereford	Anthony Priddis	24 September 2013	24 November 2009	
Lord Bishop of Leeds	Nick Baines	30 November 2025	5 February 2015	
Lord Bishop of Leicester	Tim Stevens, CBE	31 August 2015	3 December 2003	Convenor of the Lords Spiritual (2009–2015)
Lord Bishop of Lichfield				
Lord Bishop of Lincoln	John Saxbee	31 January 2011	1 July 2008	
Lord Bishop of Lincoln	Christopher Lowson	31 December 2021	14 September 2017	
Lord Bishop of Liverpool	James Jones, KBE	31 August 2013	20 October 2003	
Lord Bishop of Liverpool	Paul Bayes	2 March 2022	15 November 2021	
Lord Bishop of Manchester	Christopher Mayfield	30 September 2002	27 January 1998	
Lord Bishop of Manchester	Nigel McCulloch, KCVO	17 January 2013	18 December 2002	Translated from Wakefield: 15 October 1997
Lord Bishop of Newcastle	Martin Wharton, CBE	30 November 2014	5 February 2003	
Lord Bishop of Newcastle	Christine Hardman	30 November 2021	26 January 2016	
Lord Bishop of Norwich	Graham James	28 February 2019	17 March 2004	
Lord Bishop of Oxford	John Pritchard	31 October 2014	25 November 2010	
Lord Bishop of Peterborough	Donald Allister	8 January 2023	4 February 2014	
Lord Bishop of Portsmouth	Christopher Foster	31 May 2021	6 February 2014	
Lord Bishop of Ripon and Leeds	John Packer	31 January 2014	23 October 2006	
Lord Bishop of Rochester	Michael Nazir-Ali	31 August 2009	30 June 1999	
Lord Bishop of Rochester	James Langstaff	31 July 2021	1 April 2014	
Lord Bishop of Saint Albans	Christopher Herbert	7 January 2009	8 December 1999	
Lord Bishop of Saint Albans	Alan Smith	31 May 2025	4 November 2013	Convenor of the Lords Spiritual (2022–2025)
Lord Bishop of Saint Edmundsbury and Ipswich	Nigel Stock	21 October 2013	8 March 2011	
Lord Bishop of Saint Edmundsbury and Ipswich	Martin Seeley	28 February 2025	21 March 2022	
Lord Bishop of Salisbury	David Stancliffe	30 September 2010	20 January 1998	
Lord Bishop of Salisbury	Nick Holtam	3 July 2021	9 February 2015	
Lord Bishop of Sheffield	Jack Nicholls	16 July 2008	4 March 2003	
Lord Bishop of Southwark	Tom Butler	5 March 2010	27 October 1998	Translated from Leicester: 10 February 1997
Lord Bishop of Southwell and Nottingham				
Lord Bishop of Truro	Tim Thornton	31 August 2017	22 April 2013	
Lord Bishop of Wakefield	Stephen Platten	20 April 2014	22 June 2009	
Lord Bishop of Worcester	Peter Selby	30 September 2007	5 November 2002	
Lord Bishop of Worcester	John Inge, KCVO	9 October 2024	25 June 2012	

== Deceased ==
The following life peers, elected hereditary peers and Lords Spiritual have died since 2000:

=== 2000–2009 ===
Member of the Privy Council

‡ former MP
# former MEP

Title	Party	Date joined	Died	Type	Notes
The Lord Braine of Wheatley, PC ‡	Conservative	10 August 1992	5 January 2000	Life peer	Junior Minister
The Lord Henderson of Brompton	Crossbencher	1 February 1984	13 January 2000	Life peer	Clerk of the Parliaments (1974–1983)
The Lord Annan	Crossbencher	16 July 1965	21 February 2000	Life peer	Academic
The Lord Mackenzie-Stuart	Crossbencher	18 October 1988	1 April 2000	Life peer	President of the European Court of Justice (1984–1988); Senator of the College of Justice (1972–1973)
The Baroness Wharton	Crossbencher	11 November 1999 (Note: Sat as an Hereditary peer: 4 April 1990–11 November 1999)	15 May 2000	Elected hereditary peer	
The Lord Coggan, PC	Crossbencher	28 January 1980	17 May 2000	Life peer	Archbishop of Canterbury (1974–1980); Archbishop of York (1961–1974)
The Lord MacLehose of Beoch	Crossbencher	21 May 1982	27 May 2000	Life peer	Governor of Hong Kong (1971–1982)
The Lord Runcie, PC	Crossbencher	1 February 1991	11 July 2000	Life peer	Archbishop of Canterbury (1980–1991)
The Lord Butterfield	Conservative	10 August 1988	22 July 2000	Life peer	
The Baroness Brooke of Ystradfellte	Conservative	7 December 1964	1 September 2000	Life peer	also The Lady Brooke of Cumnor (1967–1984) also The Dowager Lady Brooke of Cumnor (1984–2000)
The Lord Harmar-Nicholls ‡ #	Conservative	10 January 1975	15 September 2000	Life peer	Junior Minister
The Lord Erroll of Hale, PC ‡	Conservative	16 November 1999 (Note: Sat as an Hereditary peer: 19 December 1964–11 November 1999)	19 September 2000	Hereditary peer given a Life Peerage	Sat as Baron Erroll of Kilmun; Cabinet Minister (1961–1964)
The Lord McConnell, PC (NI)	Crossbencher	10 February 1995	25 October 2000	Life peer	
The Baroness Ryder of Warsaw	Crossbencher	31 January 1979	2 November 2000	Life peer	also The Lady Cheshire (1991–1992) also The Dowager Lady Cheshire (1992–2000)
The Lord Greenhill of Harrow	Crossbencher	31 January 1974	8 November 2000	Life peer	Civil Servant
The Lord Cowdrey of Tonbridge	Conservative	18 July 1997	4 December 2000	Life peer	
The Lord Aldington, PC ‡	Conservative	16 November 1999 (Note: Sat as an Hereditary peer: 29 January 1962–11 November 1999)	7 December 2000	Hereditary peer given a Life Peerage	Sat as Baron Low; Junior Minister
The Baroness Denton of Wakefield	Conservative	11 June 1991	5 February 2001	Life peer	Junior Minister
The Lord Lovell-Davis	Labour	26 June 1974	6 January 2001	Life peer	Junior Minister
The Lord Prentice, PC ‡	Conservative	30 January 1992	18 January 2001	Life peer	Cabinet Minister (1974–1976)
The Lord Bellwin	Conservative	21 May 1979	11 February 2001	Life peer	Junior Minister
The Lord Plowden ‡	Crossbencher	17 February 1959	15 February 2001	Life peer	Civil Servant
The Lord MacKay of Ardbrecknish, PC ‡	Crossbencher	26 June 1991	21 February 2001	Life peer	Chairman of Committees (2000–2001); Junior Minister
The Lord Cledwyn of Penrhos, PC ‡	Labour	16 July 1979	22 February 2001	Life peer	Cabinet Minister (1966–1970); Chairman of the Parliamentary Labour Party (1974–1979); Leader of the Labour Party in the House of Lords (1982–1992)
The Lord Sieff of Brimpton	Conservative	14 February 1980	23 February 2001	Life peer	
The Lord Onslow of Woking, PC ‡	Conservative	31 October 1997	13 March 2001	Life peer	Chairman of the 1922 Committee (1984–1992); Junior Minister
The Lord Cocks of Hartcliffe, PC ‡	Labour	6 October 1987	26 March 2001	Life peer	Government Chief Whip (1976–1979)
The Lord Hartwell	Crossbencher	19 January 1968	3 April 2001	Life peer	Disclaimed the Viscountcy of Camrose in 1995.
The Lord Shepherd, PC	Labour	16 November 1999 (Note: Sat as an Hereditary peer: 4 December 1954–11 November 1999)	5 April 2001	Hereditary peer given a Life Peerage	Sat as Baron Shepherd of Spalding; Cabinet Minister (1974–1976); Government Chief Whip in the House of Lords (1964–1967); Leader of the Labour Party in the House of Lords (1976–1978)
The Lord Harris of Greenwich, PC	Liberal Democrat	26 March 1974	11 April 2001	Life peer	Junior Minister; Chief Whip of the Liberal Democrats in the House of Lords (1994–2001)
The Lord Morris of Castle Morris	Labour	9 May 1990	30 April 2001	Life peer	
The Lord Molloy ‡ #	Labour	12 May 1981	26 May 2001	Life peer	
The Lord Taylor of Gryfe	Labour	29 January 1968	13 July 2001	Life peer	
The Lord Carmichael of Kelvingrove ‡	Labour	10 October 1983	19 July 2001	Life peer	Junior Minister
The Earl of Longford, PC	Labour	16 November 1999 (Note: Sat as an Hereditary peer: 12 October 1945–11 November 1999)	3 August 2001	Hereditary peer given a Life Peerage	Sat as Baron Pakenham of Cowley; Cabinet Minister (1947–1951, 1964–1968); Leader of the Labour Party in the House of Lords (1964–1968)
The Lord Hamlyn	Labour	23 February 1998	31 August 2001	Life peer	
The Lord Sefton of Garston	Labour	3 May 1978	9 September 2001	Life peer	
The Earl of Carnarvon	Crossbencher	11 November 1999 (Note: Sat as an Hereditary peer: 22 September 1987–11 November 1999)	11 September 2001	Elected hereditary peer	
The Lord Shore of Stepney, PC ‡	Labour	5 June 1997	24 September 2001	Life peer	Cabinet Minister (1967–1970, 1974–1979)
The Lord Hailsham of Saint Marylebone, PC ‡	Non-affiliated	30 June 1970	12 October 2001	Life peer	Disclaimed the Viscountcy of Hailsham in 1963. Lord High Chancellor of Great Britain (1970–1974, 1979–1987); Cabinet Minister (1957–1964); Leader of the Conservative Party in the House of Lords (1960–1963)
The Lord Carver	Crossbencher	15 July 1977	9 December 2001	Life peer	Chief of the Defence Staff (1973–1976)
The Lord Fanshawe of Richmond ‡	Conservative	27 September 1983	28 December 2001	Life peer	Junior Minister
The Lord Young of Dartington, PC	Labour	20 March 1978	14 January 2002	Life peer	
The Lord Gibson-Watt, PC ‡	Conservative	7 September 1979	7 February 2002	Life peer	Junior Minister
The Lord Ingrow	Conservative	31 January 1983	7 February 2002	Life peer	
The Lord Johnston of Rockport	Conservative	30 March 1987	30 April 2002	Life peer	
The Lord Bauer	Conservative	10 February 1983	2 May 2002	Life peer	
The Baroness Castle of Blackburn, PC ‡ #	Labour	16 July 1990	3 May 2002	Life peer	Cabinet Minister (1964–1970, 1974–1976); Leader of the European Parliamentary Labour Party (1979–1985) also The Lady Castle (1974–1979) also The Dowager Lady Castle (1979–2002)
The Lord Moyola, PC (NI)	Conservative	20 July 1971	17 May 2002	Life peer	Prime Minister of Northern Ireland (1969–1971); Leader of the Ulster Unionist Party (1969–1971)
The Lord Keith of Kinkel, PC	Crossbencher	10 January 1977	21 June 2002	Law life peer	Law Lord (1977–1996)
The Duke of Norfolk	Conservative	11 November 1999 (Note: Sat as an Hereditary peer: 31 August 1971–11 November 1999)	24 June 2002	Earl Marshal	Earl Marshal (1975–2002)
The Lord Weinstock	Crossbencher	17 July 1980	23 July 2002	Life peer	
The Lord Brookes	Crossbencher	14 January 1976	31 July 2002	Life peer	
The Lord Holderness, PC ‡	Conservative	7 August 1979	11 August 2002	Life peer	Cabinet Minister (1959–1964)
The Lord Porter of Luddenham	Crossbencher	16 July 1990	31 August 2002	Life peer	
The Baroness Young, PC	Conservative	24 May 1971	6 September 2002	Life peer	Cabinet Minister (1981–1983); Leader of the Conservative Party in the House of Lords (1981–1983)
The Baroness Serota	Labour	20 January 1967	21 October 2002	Life peer	Junior Minister
The Baroness Hylton-Foster	Crossbencher	7 December 1965	31 October 2002	Life peer	Convenor of the Crossbench Peers (1974–1995)
The Lord Haslam	Conservative	13 August 1990	2 November 2002	Life peer	
The Lord Hambro	Conservative	26 September 1994	7 November 2002	Life peer	
The Lord Emslie, PC	Crossbencher	11 February 1980	21 November 2002	Life peer	Lord President of the Court of Session (1972–1989); Senator of the College of Justice (1970–1989)
The Lord Jenkins of Hillhead, PC ‡	Liberal Democrat	20 November 1987	5 January 2003	Life peer	President of the European Commission (1977–1981); Chancellor of the Exchequer (1967–1970); Home Secretary (1965–1967, 1974–1976); Leader of the SDP (1982–1983); Leader of the Liberal Democrats in the House of Lords (1988–1997)
The Lord Dacre of Glanton	Conservative	27 September 1979	26 January 2003	Life peer	
The Viscount Younger of Leckie, PC ‡	Conservative	7 July 1992	26 January 2003	Life peer	The Viscount Younger of Leckie was created a life peer in July 1992, before succeeding to the viscountcy in June 1997. Defence Secretary (1986–1989); Cabinet Minister (1979–1986)
The Lord Wilberforce, PC	Crossbencher	1 October 1964	15 February 2003	Law life peer	Law Lord (1964–1982)
The Lord Boardman ‡	Conservative	10 July 1980	10 March 2003	Life peer	Cabinet Minister (1974)
The Lord Gladwin of Clee	Labour	28 September 1994	10 April 2003	Life peer	President of the GMB (1976–1982)
The Lord Ryder of Eaton Hastings	Labour	15 July 1975	12 May 2003	Life peer	
The Lord Stodart of Leaston, PC ‡	Conservative	1 June 1981	31 May 2003	Life peer	Junior Minister
The Lord Butterworth	Conservative	15 May 1985	19 June 2003	Life peer	
The Lord Shawcross, PC ‡	Crossbencher	14 February 1959	10 July 2003	Life peer	Attorney General (1945–1951); Cabinet Minister (1951)
The Lord Perry of Walton	Liberal Democrat	9 February 1979	17 July 2003	Life peer	
The Lord Milner of Leeds	Labour	11 November 1999 (Note: Sat as an Hereditary peer: 16 July 1967–11 November 1999)	20 August 2003	Elected hereditary peer	
The Lord Blake	Conservative	17 May 1971	20 September 2003	Life peer	
The Lord Williams of Mostyn, PC	Labour	30 July 1992	20 September 2003	Life peer	Attorney General (1999–2001); Cabinet Minister (2001–2003); Leader of the Labour Party in the House of Lords (2001–2003)
The Lord Rayne	Crossbencher	2 August 1976	10 October 2003	Life peer	
The Lord Walker of Doncaster, PC ‡	Labour	26 September 1997	2 November 2003	Life peer	Chairman of Ways and Means (1983–1992); Junior Minister
The Lord Wallace of Coslany ‡	Labour	17 January 1975	11 November 2003	Life peer	Junior Minister
The Lord Hardy of Wath ‡	Labour	27 September 1997	16 December 2003	Life peer	
The Lord Dormand of Easington ‡	Labour	13 October 1987	18 December 2003	Life peer	Chairman of the Parliamentary Labour Party (1981–1979)
The Lord Islwyn ‡	Labour	25 October 1997	19 December 2003	Life peer	
The Lord Gallacher	Labour	28 March 1983	4 January 2004	Life peer	
The Baroness Pike ‡	Conservative	15 May 1974	11 January 2004	Life peer	Junior Minister
The Lord Jenkins of Putney, PC ‡	Labour	14 May 1981	26 January 2004	Life peer	Junior Minister
The Lord Scanlon	Labour	19 February 1979	27 January 2004	Life peer	President of the AEU (1968–1978)
The Lord Bullock	Crossbencher	30 January 1976	2 February 2004	Life peer	Vice-Chancellor of the University of Oxford (1969–1973)
The Lord Vivian	Conservative	11 November 1999 (Note: Sat as an Hereditary peer: 24 June 1991–11 November 1999)	28 February 2004	Elected hereditary peer	
The Lord Constantine of Stanmore	Conservative	21 July 1981	15 March 2004	Life peer	
The Lord Hobhouse of Woodborough, PC	Crossbencher	1 October 1998	15 March 2004	Law life peer	Law Lord (1998–2004)
The Lord Diamond, PC ‡	Labour	25 September 1970	3 April 2004	Life peer	Cabinet Minister (1964–1970); Leader of the SDP in the House of Lords (1982–1988)
The Lord Geraint ‡	Liberal Democrat	18 July 1992	17 April 2004	Life peer	
The Lord Gibson	Crossbencher	31 January 1975	20 April 2004	Life peer	Chairman of Arts Council of Great Britain (1972–1977)
The Baroness Brigstocke	Conservative	21 May 1990	30 April 2004	Life peer	also The Lady Griffiths (2000–2004)
The Lord Hill-Norton	Crossbencher	5 February 1979	16 May 2004	Life peer	Chief of the Defence Staff (1971–1973)
The Lord Murray of Epping Forest, PC	Labour	14 February 1985	20 May 2004	Life peer	General Secretary of the Trades Union Congress (1973–1984)
The Lord Greene of Harrow Weald	Labour	21 January 1975	26 July 2004	Life peer	General Secretary of the NUR (1957–1975); President of the Trades Union Congress (1970)
The Lord Wigoder	Liberal Democrat	16 May 1974	12 August 2004	Life peer	Chief Whip of the Liberal Party in the House of Lords (1977–1984)
The Lord Richardson	Crossbencher	2 February 1979	15 August 2004	Life peer	
The Lord Keith of Castleacre	Conservative	6 February 1980	1 September 2004	Life peer	
The Lord Parry	Labour	21 January 1976	1 September 2004	Life peer	
The Lord Clark of Kempston, PC ‡	Conservative	21 July 1992	4 October 2004	Life peer	
The Earl Russell	Liberal Democrat	11 November 1999 (Note: Sat as an Hereditary peer: 16 December 1987–11 November 1999)	14 October 2004	Elected hereditary peer	
The Lord Chapple	Crossbencher	4 February 1985	20 October 2004	Life peer	General Secretary of the ETU (1966–1968); General Secretary of the EEPTU (1968–1984); President of the Trades Union Congress (1983)
The Lord Hanson	Conservative	30 June 1983	1 November 2004	Life peer	
The Lord Scarman, PC	Crossbencher	30 September 1977	8 December 2004	Law life peer	Law Lord (1977–1986)
The Lord Burnham	Conservative	11 November 1999 (Note: Sat as an Hereditary peer: 18 June 1993–11 November 1999)	1 January 2005	Elected hereditary peer	
The Lord Aberdare, PC	Conservative	11 November 1999 (Note: Sat as an Hereditary peer: 4 October 1957–11 November 1999)	23 January 2005	Elected hereditary peer	Cabinet Minister (1974); Chairman of Committees (1977–1992)
The Lord Sheppard of Liverpool	Labour	14 February 1998	5 March 2005	Life peer	Bishop of Liverpool (1975–1997)
The Baroness Strange	Crossbencher	11 November 1999 (Note: Sat as an Hereditary peer: 10 December 1986–11 November 1999)	10 March 2005	Elected hereditary peer	
The Lord Callaghan of Cardiff, PC ‡	Labour	5 November 1987	26 March 2005	Life peer	Prime Minister (1976–1979); Chancellor of the Exchequer (1964–1967); Foreign Secretary (1974–1976); Home Secretary (1967–1970); Leader of the Labour Party (1976–1980)
The Lord Roll of Ipsden	Crossbencher	19 July 1977	30 March 2005	Life peer	Civil Servant
The Lord Bruce of Donington ‡ #	Labour	20 January 1975	18 April 2005	Life peer	
The Lord Trotman	Crossbencher	2 March 1999	25 April 2005	Life peer	
The Lord Campbell of Croy, PC ‡	Conservative	9 January 1975	26 April 2005	Life peer	Cabinet Minister (1970–1974)
The Lord Orme, PC ‡	Labour	21 October 1997	27 April 2005	Life peer	Chairman of the Parliamentary Labour Party (1987–1992); Cabinet Minister (1976–1979)
The Baroness Blatch, PC	Conservative	7 April 1987	31 May 2005	Life peer	Junior Minister
The Lord King of Wartnaby	Conservative	15 July 1983	12 July 2005	Life peer	
The Lord Carlisle of Bucklow, PC ‡	Conservative	2 November 1987	14 July 2005	Life peer	Cabinet Minister (1979–1981)
The Lord Whaddon ‡	Labour	26 April 1978	16 August 2005	Life peer	
The Lord Lane, PC	Crossbencher	28 September 1979	22 August 2005	Law life peer	Law Lord (1979–1980); Lord Chief Justice of England (1980–1992)
The Lord Fitt ‡	Independent socialist	14 October 1983	26 August 2005	Life peer	Leader of the Social Democratic and Labour Party (1970–1979)
The Lord Donaldson of Lymington, PC	Crossbencher	15 February 1988	31 August 2005	Life peer	Master of the Rolls (1982–1992)
The Lord Alexander of Weedon	Conservative	11 July 1988	6 November 2005	Life peer	
The Lord Belstead, PC	Conservative	17 November 1999 (Note: Sat as an Hereditary peer: 15 August 1958–11 November 1999)	3 December 2005	Hereditary peer given a Life Peerage	Sat as Baron Ganzoni; Cabinet Minister (1988–1990); Leader of the Conservative Party in the House of Lords (1988–1990)
The Lord Barber, PC ‡	Conservative	6 January 1975	16 December 2005	Life peer	Chancellor of the Exchequer (1970–1974); Cabinet Minister (1963–1964, 1970)
The Baroness Fisher of Rednal ‡ #	Labour	2 July 1974	18 December 2005	Life peer	
The Lord Merlyn-Rees ‡	Labour	1 July 1992	5 January 2006	Life peer	Home Secretary (1976–1979); Cabinet Minister (1974–1976)
The Lord Stratford ‡	Labour	23 June 2005	8 January 2006	Life peer	Junior Minister
The Lord Chan	Crossbencher	2 June 2001	21 January 2006	Life peer	
The Lord Mishcon	Labour	10 May 1978	27 January 2006	Life peer	
The Lord Brightman, PC	Crossbencher	12 March 1982	6 February 2006	Law life peer	Law Lord (1982–1986)
The Lord Gray of Contin, PC ‡	Conservative	4 July 1983	14 March 2006	Life peer	Junior Minister
The Lord Simon of Glaisdale, PC ‡	Crossbencher	5 February 1971	7 March 2006	Life peer	Law Lord (1971–1977); President of the Probate, Divorce and Admiralty Division (1962–1971); Solicitor General (1959–1962)
The Lord Ackner, PC	Crossbencher	30 January 1986	21 March 2006	Law life peer	Law Lord (1986–1992)
The Lord Rawlinson of Ewell, PC ‡	Conservative	17 April 1978	28 June 2006	Life peer	Attorney General (1970–1974); Solicitor General (1962–1964)
The Baroness Lloyd of Highbury	Crossbencher	19 August 1996	28 June 2006	Life peer	
The Lord Cooke of Thorndon, PC	Crossbencher	3 April 1996	30 August 2006	Life peer	Law Lord (1996–2001)
The Lord Monro of Langholm, PC ‡	Conservative	6 November 1997	30 August 2006	Life peer	Junior Minister
The Lord Harris of High Cross	Crossbencher	19 July 1979	18 October 2006	Life peer	
The Lord Peyton of Yeovil, PC ‡	Conservative	5 October 1983	22 November 2006	Life peer	Cabinet Minister (1970)
The Lord Mowbray, Segrave and Stourton	Conservative	11 November 1999 (Note: Sat as an Hereditary peer: 7 May 1965–11 November 1999)	12 December 2006	Elected hereditary peer	Junior Minister
The Lord Carter, PC	Labour	23 March 1987	18 December 2006	Life peer	Junior Minister; Government Chief Whip in the House of Lords (1997–2002)
The Lord Hussey of North Bradley	Crossbencher	11 September 1996	27 December 2006	Life peer	Chairman of the BBC (1986–1996)
The Lord Cockfield, PC	Conservative	14 April 1978	8 January 2007	Life peer	Cabinet Minister (1982–1984); European Commissioner (1985–1989)
The Lord Nolan, PC	Crossbencher	11 January 1994	22 January 2007	Law life peer	Law Lord (1994–1998)
The Lord Kelvedon, PC ‡	Conservative	11 June 1997	27 January 2007	Life peer	Cabinet Minister (1986–1989)
The Earl Jellicoe, PC	Conservative	17 November 1999 (Note: Sat as an Hereditary peer: 20 November 1935–11 November 1999)	22 February 2007	Hereditary peer given a Life Peerage	Sat as Baron Jellicoe of Southampton; Cabinet Minister (1970–1973); Leader of the Conservative Party in the House of Lords (1970–1973)
The Baroness Jeger ‡	Labour	11 July 1979	26 February 2007	Life peer	
The Lord Forte	Conservative	2 February 1982	28 February 2007	Life peer	
The Lord Weatherill, PC ‡	Crossbencher	15 July 1992	6 May 2007	Life peer	Speaker of the House of Commons (1983–1992); Chairman of Ways and Means (1979–1983); Convenor of the Crossbench Peers (1995–1999); Junior Minister
The Lord Renton, PC ‡	Conservative	11 July 1979	24 May 2007	Life peer	Junior Minister
The Lord Ewing of Kirkford ‡	Labour	17 July 1992	9 June 2007	Life peer	Junior Minister
The Lord Jauncey of Tullichettle, PC	Crossbencher	9 February 1988	18 July 2007	Law life peer	Law Lord (1988–1996)
The Lord Garden	Liberal Democrat	3 June 2004	9 August 2007	Life peer	
The Lord Biffen, PC ‡	Conservative	3 June 1997	14 August 2007	Life peer	Cabinet Minister (1979–1987)
The Lord Deedes, PC ‡	Conservative	23 September 1986	17 August 2007	Life peer	Cabinet Minister (1962–1964)
The Lord Gilmour of Craigmillar, PC ‡	Conservative	25 August 1992	21 September 2007	Life peer	Defence Secretary (1974); Cabinet Minister (1979–1981)
The Lord Oliver of Aylmerton, PC	Crossbencher	31 January 1986	17 October 2007	Law life peer	Law Lord (1986–1992)
The Lord Cooke of Islandreagh	Crossbencher	11 August 1992	13 November 2007	Life peer	
The Lord Bridge of Harwich, PC	Crossbencher	29 September 1980	20 November 2007	Law life peer	Law Lord (1980–1992)
The Lord Allen of Abbeydale	Crossbencher	12 July 1976	27 November 2007	Life peer	Civil Servant
The Lord Thomas of Gwydir, PC ‡	Conservative	7 October 1987	4 February 2008	Life peer	Cabinet Minister (1970–1974)
The Baroness Darcy de Knayth	Crossbencher	11 November 1999 (Note: Sat as an Hereditary peer: 23 March 1943–11 November 1999)	24 February 2008	Elected hereditary peer	
The Lord Pym, PC ‡	Conservative	9 October 1987	7 March 2008	Life peer	Foreign Secretary (1982–1983); Defence Secretary (1979–1981); Cabinet Minister (1973–1974, 1981–1982); Government Chief Whip (1970–1973)
The Lord Stallard ‡	Labour	7 September 1983	29 March 2008	Life peer	Junior Minister
The Lord Beaumont of Whitley	Green	6 December 1967	9 April 2008	Life peer	
The Lord Holme of Cheltenham, PC	Liberal Democrat	29 May 1990	4 May 2008	Life peer	
The Baroness Michie of Gallanach ‡	Liberal Democrat	14 July 2001	6 May 2008	Life peer	
The Lord Blease	Labour	21 July 1978	16 May 2008	Life peer	Trade unionist
The Lord Burlison	Labour	21 October 1997	20 May 2008	Life peer	Junior Minister; Deputy General Secretary of the GMB (1991–1996)
The Lord Hunt of Tanworth	Crossbencher	8 February 1980	17 July 2008	Life peer	Cabinet Secretary (1973–1979)
The Lord Stokes	Crossbencher	9 January 1969	21 July 2008	Life peer	
The Lord Russell-Johnston ‡ #	Liberal Democrat	21 July 1997	27 July 2008	Life peer	
The Lord Varley, PC ‡	Labour	30 May 1990	29 July 2008	Life peer	Cabinet Minister (1974–1979)
The Lord Bruce-Lockhart	Conservative	9 June 2006	14 August 2008	Life peer	Leader of Kent County Council (1997–2005)
The Lord Thomson of Monifieth, PC ‡	Liberal Democrat	23 March 1977	3 October 2008	Life peer	Cabinet Minister (1966–1970); European Commissioner (1973–1977)
The Lord Hogg of Cumbernauld ‡	Labour	24 September 1997	8 October 2008	Life peer	
The Lord Cuckney	Conservative	25 July 1995	30 October 2008	Life peer	
The Lord Rees, PC ‡	Conservative	16 November 1987	30 November 2008	Life peer	Cabinet Minister (1983–1985)
The Lord Lane of Horsell	Conservative	17 July 1990	9 January 2009	Life peer	
The Lord Dearing	Crossbencher	13 February 1998	19 February 2009	Life peer	Civil Servant
The Lord Clyde, PC	Crossbencher	1 October 1996	6 March 2009	Law life peer	Law Lord (1996–2001)
The Lord Dean of Harptree, PC ‡	Conservative	5 October 1993	1 April 2009	Life peer	First Deputy Chairman of Ways and Means (1987–1992); Second Deputy Chairman of Ways and Means (1982–1987); Junior Minister
The Lord Moore of Wolvercote, PC	Crossbencher	22 July 1986	7 April 2009	Life peer	Private Secretary to the Sovereign (1977–1986)
The Lord Slynn of Hadley, PC	Crossbencher	11 March 1992	7 April 2009	Law life peer	Law Lord (1992–2002)
The Lord George, PC	Crossbencher	29 June 2004	18 April 2009	Life peer	Governor of the Bank of England (1993–2003)
The Viscount Bledisloe	Crossbencher	11 November 1999 (Note: Sat as an Hereditary peer: 17 September 1979–11 November 1999)	12 May 2009	Elected hereditary peer	
The Lord Dahrendorf	Crossbencher	15 July 1993	17 June 2009	Life peer	European Commissioner (1970–1977)
The Lord Blaker, PC ‡	Conservative	10 October 1994	5 July 2009	Life peer	Junior Minister
The Lord Murton of Lindisfarne, PC ‡	Conservative	25 July 1979	5 July 2009	Life peer	Chairman of Ways and Means (1976–1979); First Deputy Chairman of Ways and Means (1974–1976); Second Deputy Chairman of Ways and Means (1973–1974); Junior Minister
The Lord Kingsland, PC #	Conservative	7 October 1994	12 July 2009	Life peer	Leader of the Conservative Party in the European Parliament (1987–1994)
The Lord Gregson	Labour	11 July 1975	12 August 2009	Life peer	
The Lord Buxton of Alsa	Conservative	11 May 1978	1 September 2009	Life peer	
The Baroness Chapman	Crossbencher	24 June 2004	3 September 2009	Life peer	
The Lord Plummer of Saint Marylebone	Conservative	29 May 1981	2 October 2009	Life peer	Leader of the Greater London Council (1967–1973)
The Baroness Elles #	Conservative	2 May 1972	17 October 2009	Life peer	
The Lord Steinberg	Conservative	23 June 2004	2 November 2009	Life peer	
The Baroness David	Labour	28 April 1978	29 November 2009	Life peer	Junior Minister

=== 2010–2019 ===
Member of the Privy Council

‡ former MP
# former MEP

Title	Party	Date joined	Resigned	Died	Type	Notes
The Viscount of Oxfuird	Conservative	11 November 1999 (Note: Sat as an Hereditary peer: 24 January 1986–11 November 1999)		22 January 2010	Elected hereditary peer	
The Lord Richardson of Duntisbourne, PC	Crossbencher	11 February 1983		22 January 2010	Life peer	Governor of the Bank of England (1973–1983)
The Baroness Park of Monmouth	Conservative	27 February 1990		24 March 2010	Life peer	
The Earl of Northesk	Conservative	11 November 1999 (Note: Sat as an Hereditary peer: 26 January 1994–11 November 1999)		28 March 2010	Elected hereditary peer	
The Viscount Colville of Culross	Crossbencher	11 November 1999 (Note: Sat as an Hereditary peer: 14 March 1945–11 November 1999)		8 April 2010	Elected hereditary peer	Junior Minister
The Lord Bernstein of Craigweil	Labour	15 May 2000		13 April 2010	Life peer	
The Lord Wolfson	Conservative	13 June 1985		20 May 2010	Life peer	
The Baroness Delacourt-Smith of Alteryn	Labour	5 July 1974		8 June 2010	Life peer	also The Lady Delacourt-Smith (1967–1972) also The Dowager Lady Delacourt-Smith (1972–2010)
The Lord Quinton	Conservative	7 February 1983		19 June 2010	Life peer	
The Lord Laing of Dunphail	Conservative	8 February 1991		21 June 2010	Life peer	
The Lord Walker of Worcester, PC ‡	Conservative	7 July 1992		22 June 2010	Life peer	Cabinet Minister (1970–1974, 1979–1990)
The Lord Flowers	Crossbencher	20 February 1979		25 June 2010	Life peer	
The Lord McIntosh of Haringey, PC	Labour	17 January 1983		27 August 2010	Life peer	Junior Minister
The Lord Lyell of Markyate, PC ‡	Conservative	27 June 2005		30 August 2010	Life peer	Attorney General (1992–1997); Solicitor General (1987–1992)
The Lord Bingham of Cornhill, PC	Crossbencher	4 June 1996		11 September 2010	Life peer	Law Lord (2000–2008); Lord Chief Justice of England and Wales (1996–2000); Master of the Rolls (1992–1996)
The Lord Livsey of Talgarth ‡	Liberal Democrat	28 August 2001		15 September 2010	Life peer	
The Lord Acton	Labour	17 April 2000 (Note: Sat as an Hereditary peer: 23 January 1989–11 November 1999)		10 October 2010	Hereditary peer given a Life Peerage	Sat as Baron Acton of Bridgnorth
The Baroness Carnegy of Lour	Conservative	14 July 1982		9 November 2010	Life peer	
The Lord Windlesham, PC	Conservative	16 November 1999 (Note: Sat as an Hereditary peer: 16 November 1962–11 November 1999)		21 December 2010	Hereditary peer given a Life Peerage	Sat as Baron Hennessy; Cabinet Minister 1973–1974); Leader of the Conservative Party in the House of Lords (1973–1974)
The Lord Strabolgi	Labour	11 November 1999 (Note: Sat as an Hereditary peer: 8 October 1953–11 November 1999)		24 December 2010	Elected hereditary peer	Junior Minister
The Lord Fyfe of Fairfield	Labour	16 May 2000		1 February 2011	Life peer	
The Lord Monson	Crossbencher	11 November 1999 (Note: Sat as an Hereditary peer: 7 April 1958–11 November 1999)		12 February 2011	Elected hereditary peer	
The Lord Pilkington of Oxenford	Conservative	12 January 1996		14 February 2011	Life peer	
The Lord Ampthill, PC	Crossbencher	11 November 1999 (Note: Sat as an Hereditary peer: 3 June 1973–11 November 1999)		23 April 2011	Elected hereditary peer	Chairman of Committees (1992–1994)
The Earl of Onslow	Conservative	11 November 1999 (Note: Sat as an Hereditary peer: 3 June 1971–11 November 1999)		14 May 2011	Elected hereditary peer	
The Lord Elliott of Morpeth ‡	Conservative	14 July 1982		20 May 2011	Life peer	Junior Minister
The Lord Rodger of Earlsferry, PC	Crossbencher	29 April 1992		26 June 2011	Life peer	Justice of the Supreme Court of the United Kingdom (2009–2011); Law Lord (2001–2009); Lord President of the Court of Session (1996–2002); Senator of the College of Justice (1995–2002); Lord Advocate (1992–1995); Solicitor General (1989–1992)
The Lord Boston of Faversham ‡	Crossbencher	1 July 1976		23 July 2011	Life peer	Chairman of Committees (1994–2000); Junior Minister
The Lord Marsh, PC ‡	Crossbencher	15 July 1981		29 July 2011	Life peer	Cabinet Minister
The Lord Croham	Crossbencher	8 February 1978		11 September 2011	Life peer	Civil Servant
The Lord Gould of Brookwood	Labour	7 June 2004		6 November 2011	Life peer	
The Lord Carr of Hadley, PC ‡	Conservative	15 January 1976		17 February 2012	Life peer	Home Secretary (1972–1974); Cabinet Minister (1970–1972)
The Lord Corbett of Castle Vale ‡	Labour	5 July 2001		19 February 2012	Life peer	
The Lord Hooson ‡	Liberal Democrat	26 July 1979		21 February 2012	Life peer	
The Lord St John of Fawsley, PC ‡	Conservative	19 October 1987		2 March 2012	Life peer	Cabinet Minister (1979–1981)
The Lord Wedderburn of Charlton	Labour	20 July 1977		9 March 2012	Life peer	
The Lord Newton of Braintree, PC ‡	Conservative	31 October 1997		25 March 2012	Life peer	Cabinet Minister (1988–1997)
The Lord Brett	Labour	20 July 1999		29 March 2012	Life peer	General Secretary of the IPMS (1989–1999)
The Lord Ashley of Stoke, PC ‡	Labour	10 July 1992		20 April 2012	Life peer	
The Baroness Ritchie of Brompton	Conservative	25 June 2010		24 April 2012	Life peer	
The Lord Glenamara, PC ‡	Labour	28 January 1977		4 May 2012	Life peer	Cabinet Minister (1968–1970, 1974–1976); Government Chief Whip (1964–1966)
The Baroness McFarlane of Llandaff	Crossbencher	30 July 1979		13 May 2012	Life peer	
The Lord Maples ‡	Conservative	24 June 2010		9 June 2012	Life peer	Junior Minister
The Lord Archer of Sandwell, PC ‡	Labour	9 July 1992		14 June 2012	Life peer	Solicitor General (1974–1979)
The Lord Marshall of Knightsbridge	Crossbencher	20 July 1998		5 July 2012	Life peer	
The Lord Chilver	Conservative	14 July 1987		8 July 2012	Life peer	
The Lord Randall of Saint Budeaux ‡	Labour	25 September 1997		11 August 2012	Life peer	
The Lord Morris of Manchester, PC ‡	Labour	6 October 1997		12 August 2012	Life peer	Junior Minister
The Lord Lofthouse of Pontefract ‡	Labour	11 June 1997		1 November 2012	Life peer	First Deputy Chairman of Ways and Means (1992–1997)
The Earl Ferrers, PC	Conservative	11 November 1999 (Note: Sat as an Hereditary peer: 11 October 1954–11 November 1999)		13 November 2012	Elected hereditary peer	Junior Minister
The Lord McCarthy	Labour	19 January 1976		18 November 2012	Life peer	
The Lord Rees-Mogg	Crossbencher	8 August 1988		29 December 2012	Life peer	Chairman of Arts Council of Great Britain (1982–1989)
The Lord King of West Bromwich	Labour	22 July 1999		9 January 2013	Life peer	
The Baroness Thatcher, PC ‡	Conservative	26 June 1992		8 April 2013	Life peer	Prime Minister (1979–1990); Cabinet Minister (1970–1974); Leader of the Conservative Party (1975–1990)
The Lord Northfield ‡	Labour	20 January 1976		26 April 2013	Life peer	
The Lord Reay #	Conservative	11 November 1999 (Note: Sat as an Hereditary peer: 10 March 1963–11 November 1999)		10 May 2013	Elected hereditary peer	Junior Minister
The Lord Gilbert, PC ‡	Labour	16 May 1997		2 June 2013	Life peer	Junior Minister
The Lord Fraser of Carmyllie, PC ‡	Conservative	10 February 1989		23 June 2013	Life peer	Lord Advocate (1989–1992); Solicitor General (1982–1989)
The Lord Campbell of Alloway	Conservative	2 June 1981		30 June 2013	Life peer	
The Lord Chitnis	Crossbencher	18 July 1974		12 July 2013	Life peer	
The Lord Hayhoe, PC ‡	Conservative	21 August 1992		7 September 2013	Life peer	Junior Minister
The Lord Kingsdown, PC	Crossbencher	14 July 1993		24 November 2013	Life peer	Governor of the Bank of England (1983–1993)
The Lord Roberts of Conwy, PC ‡	Conservative	1 October 1997		14 December 2013	Life peer	Junior Minister
The Lord McAlpine of West Green	Conservative	2 February 1984	26 May 2010	17 January 2014	Life peer	Retained tax residency (domicile) in
The Lord Moran	Crossbencher	11 November 1999 (Note: Sat as an Hereditary peer: 12 April 1977–11 November 1999)		14 February 2014	Elected hereditary peer	Diplomat
The Lord Bilston ‡	Labour	20 June 2005		25 February 2014	Life peer	
The Lord Ballyedmond	Conservative	18 June 2004		13 March 2014	Life peer	
The Lord Kimball ‡	Conservative	9 May 1985		26 March 2014	Life peer	
The Lord Templeman, PC	Crossbencher	30 September 1982		4 June 2014	Law life peer	Law Lord (1982–1994)
The Lord Macaulay of Bragar	Non-affiliated	9 January 1989		12 June 2014	Life peer	
The Baroness Miller of Hendon	Conservative	14 October 1993		21 June 2014	Life peer	Junior Minister
The Lord Jacobs	Non-affiliated	18 October 1997		21 June 2014	Life peer	
The Lord Methuen	Liberal Democrat	11 November 1999 (Note: Sat as an Hereditary peer: 24 August 1994–11 November 1999)		9 July 2014	Elected hereditary peer	
The Lord Lewis of Newnham	Crossbencher	8 February 1989		17 July 2014	Life peer	
The Lord Attenborough	Non-affiliated	30 July 1993		24 August 2014	Life peer	
The Lord Bannside, PC ‡ #	DUP	18 June 2010		12 September 2014	Life peer	First Minister of Northern Ireland (2007–2008); Leader of the Democratic Unionist Party (1971–2008)
The Viscount Allenby	Crossbencher	11 November 1999 (Note: Sat as an Hereditary peer: 17 July 1984–11 November 1999)		3 October 2014	Elected hereditary peer	
The Lord Barnett, PC ‡	Labour	30 September 1983		1 November 2014	Life peer	Cabinet Minister (1974–1979)
The Baroness James of Holland Park	Conservative	7 February 1991		27 November 2014	Life peer	
The Lord Knights	Crossbencher	22 July 1987		11 December 2014	Life peer	
The Lord Brittan of Spennithorne, PC ‡	Conservative	9 February 2000		21 January 2015	Life peer	Home Secretary (1983–1985); Cabinet Minister (1981–1983, 1985–1986); European Commissioner (1989–1999)
The Baroness Platt of Writtle	Conservative	28 May 1981		1 February 2015	Life peer	
The Lord Gavron	Labour	6 August 1999		7 February 2015	Life peer	
The Lord Mackie of Benshie ‡	Liberal Democrat	10 May 1974		17 February 2015	Life peer	
The Lord Molyneaux of Killead, PC ‡	Crossbencher	10 June 1997		9 March 2015	Life peer	Leader of the Ulster Unionist Party (1979–1995)
The Lord Sheppard of Didgemere	Conservative	6 September 1994		25 March 2015	Life peer	
The Lord Mason of Barnsley, PC ‡	Labour	20 October 1987		19 April 2015	Life peer	Defence Secretary (1974–1976); Cabinet Minister (1968–1970, 1976–1979)
The Lord Mustill, PC	Crossbencher	10 January 1992		24 April 2015	Law life peer	Law Lord (1992–1997)
The Baroness Rendell of Babergh	Labour	24 October 1997		2 May 2015	Life peer	
The Lord Griffiths, PC	Crossbencher	23 May 1985		30 May 2015	Law life peer	Law Lord (1985–1993)
The Lord Williamson of Horton, PC	Crossbencher	5 February 1999		30 August 2015	Life peer	Civil Servant; Convenor of the Crossbench Peers (2004–2007)
The Lord Montagu of Beaulieu	Conservative	11 November 1999 (Note: Sat as an Hereditary peer: 30 March 1929–11 November 1999)		31 August 2015	Elected hereditary peer	He gave notice of his resignation with effect from 17 September 2015
The Lord Moser	Crossbencher	23 June 2001		4 September 2015	Life peer	
The Lord Kilpatrick of Kincraig	Crossbencher	16 February 1996		16 September 2015	Life peer	
The Lord Luke	Crossbencher	11 November 1999 (Note: Sat as an Hereditary peer: 25 May 1996–11 November 1999)	24 June 2015	2 October 2015	Elected hereditary peer	
The Lord Healey, PC ‡	Labour	29 June 1992		3 October 2015	Life peer	Chancellor of the Exchequer (1974–1979); Defence Secretary (1964–1970)
The Lord Howe of Aberavon, PC ‡	Conservative	30 June 1992	19 May 2015	9 October 2015	Life peer	Chancellor of the Exchequer (1979–1983); Foreign Secretary (1983–1989); Cabinet Minister (1989–1990); Solicitor General (1970–1972)
The Lord Noon	Labour	27 January 2011		27 October 2015	Life peer	
The Lord Janner of Braunstone ‡	Labour	25 October 1997		19 December 2015	Life peer	
The Lord Ezra	Liberal Democrat	2 February 1983		22 December 2015	Life peer	
The Lord Weidenfeld	Crossbencher	25 June 1976		20 January 2016	Life peer	
The Lord Parkinson, PC ‡	Conservative	29 June 1992	14 September 2015	22 January 2016	Life peer	Cabinet Minister (1981–1983, 1987–1990)
The Lord Roper, PC ‡	Liberal Democrat	12 May 2000	23 May 2015	29 January 2016	Life peer	Chief Whip of the SDP (1981–1983); Chief Whip of the Liberal Democrats in the House of Lords (2001–2005)
The Lord Avebury ‡	Liberal Democrat	11 November 1999 (Note: Sat as an Hereditary peer: 21 June 1971–11 November 1999)		14 February 2016	Elected hereditary peer	Chief Whip of the Liberal Party (1963–1970)
The Lord Chorley	Crossbencher	11 September 2001 (Note: Sat as an Hereditary peer: 27 January 1978–11 November 1999)	17 November 2014	21 February 2016	Elected hereditary peer	
The Lord Brooks of Tremorfa	Labour	17 July 1979		4 March 2016	Life peer	
The Lord Evans of Parkside ‡ #	Labour	10 June 1997	20 April 2015	5 March 2016	Life peer	
The Lord Briggs	Crossbencher	19 July 1976		15 March 2016	Life peer	
The Lord Walton of Detchant	Crossbencher	24 July 1989		21 April 2016	Life peer	
The Lord Peston	Labour	24 March 1987		23 April 2016	Life peer	
The Lord Neill of Bladen	Crossbencher	28 November 1997	18 May 2016	28 May 2016	Life peer	Vice-Chancellor of the University of Oxford (1985–1989)
The Lord Leach of Fairford	Conservative	6 June 2006		12 June 2016	Life peer	
The Lord Mayhew of Twysden, PC ‡	Conservative	12 June 1997	1 June 2015	25 June 2016	Life peer	Cabinet Minister (1992–1997); Attorney General (1987–1992); Solicitor General (1983–1987)
The Lord Evans of Temple Guiting	Labour	11 May 2000		6 July 2016	Life peer	Junior Minister
The Lord Goff of Chieveley, PC	Crossbencher	9 February 1986		14 August 2016	Law life peer	Law Lord (1986–1998)
The Lord Rix	Crossbencher	27 January 1992		20 August 2016	Life peer	
The Lord Borrie	Labour	21 December 1995		30 September 2016	Life peer	
The Lord Taylor of Blackburn	Labour	4 May 1978		25 November 2016	Life peer	
The Lord Prior, PC ‡	Conservative	14 October 1987		12 December 2016	Life peer	Cabinet Minister (1970–1974, 1979–1984)
The Lord Jenkin of Roding, PC ‡	Conservative	3 November 1987	6 January 2015	20 December 2016	Life peer	Cabinet Minister (1970–1974, 1979–1984)
The Lord Goodhart	Liberal Democrat	23 October 1997	15 May 2015	10 January 2017	Life peer	
The Lord Lyell	Conservative	11 November 1999 (Note: Sat as an Hereditary peer: 27 April 1943–11 November 1999)		11 January 2017	Elected hereditary peer	Junior Minister
The Earl of Snowdon	Crossbencher	16 November 1999 (Note: Sat as an Hereditary peer: 6 October 1961–11 November 1999)	31 March 2016	13 January 2017	Hereditary peer given a Life Peerage	Sat as Baron Armstrong-Jones
The Baroness Heyhoe Flint	Conservative	21 January 2011		18 January 2017	Life peer	
The Baroness Wall of New Barnet	Labour	10 June 2004		25 January 2017	Life peer	Trade unionist
The Lord Dixon, PC ‡	Labour	9 June 1997	9 February 2016	19 February 2017	Life peer	
The Lord Waddington, PC ‡	Conservative	4 December 1990	26 March 2015	23 February 2017	Life peer	Home Secretary (1989–1990); Cabinet Minister (1990–1992); Government Chief Whip (1987–1989); Leader of the Conservative Party in the House of Lords (1990–1992)
The Lord Prys-Davies	Non-affiliated	9 February 1983	23 May 2015	28 March 2017	Life peer	
The Lord Williams of Baglan	Crossbencher	23 July 2010		23 April 2017	Life peer	
The Lord Bagri	Conservative	14 February 1997	6 July 2010	26 April 2017	Life peer	Retained tax residency (domicile) in
The Lord Thomas of Swynnerton	Crossbencher	16 June 1981		7 May 2017	Life peer	
The Lord Soulsby of Swaffham Prior	Conservative	22 May 1990	31 December 2015	8 May 2017	Life peer	
The Lord Bridges	Crossbencher	11 November 1999 (Note: Sat as an Hereditary peer: 27 August 1969–11 November 1999)	18 May 2016	27 May 2017	Elected hereditary peer	Diplomat
The Lord Joffe	Labour	16 February 2000	30 March 2016	18 June 2017	Life peer	
The Lord Sandberg	Liberal Democrat	2 October 1997	8 May 2015	2 July 2017	Life peer	
The Lord McCluskey	Crossbencher	29 September 1976	1 March 2017	20 July 2017	Life peer	Senator of the College of Justice (1984–2004); Solicitor General (1974–1979)
The Lord Hart of Chilton	Labour	4 June 2004		3 August 2017	Life peer	
The Lord Hutchinson of Lullington	Liberal Democrat	16 May 1978	3 October 2011	13 November 2017	Life peer	
The Lord Imbert	Crossbencher	10 February 1999		13 November 2017	Life peer	Commissioner of the Metropolitan Police (1987–1992)
The Lord Barber of Tewkesbury	Crossbencher	12 August 1992	25 March 2016	21 November 2017	Life peer	
The Lord Steyn, PC	Crossbencher	11 January 1995		28 November 2017	Law life peer	Law Lord (1995–2005)
The Lord Quirk	Crossbencher	12 July 1994		20 December 2017	Life peer	
The Baroness Nicol	Labour	20 January 1983		15 January 2018	Life peer	
The Lord Sutherland of Houndwood	Crossbencher	29 June 2001		29 January 2018	Life peer	
The Baroness Turner of Camden	Labour	29 May 1985	13 June 2017	26 February 2018	Life peer	Trade unionist
The Lord Stewartby, PC ‡	Conservative	20 July 1992	12 November 2015	3 March 2018	Life peer	Junior Minister
The Baroness Dean of Thornton-le-Fylde, PC	Labour	12 October 1993		13 March 2018	Life peer	General Secretary of SOGAT (1985–1991)
The Lord Crickhowell, PC ‡	Conservative	15 October 1987		17 March 2018	Life peer	Cabinet Minister (1979–1987)
The Lord Richard, PC ‡	Labour	14 May 1990		18 March 2018	Life peer	Cabinet Minister (1997–1998); European Commissioner (1981–1985); Leader of the Labour Party in the House of Lords (1992–1998)
The Baroness Farrington of Ribbleton	Labour	29 September 1994		30 March 2018	Life peer	Junior Minister
The Baroness Gibson of Market Rasen	Labour	9 May 2000		20 April 2018	Life peer	Trade unionist
The Lord Martin of Springburn, PC ‡	Crossbencher	25 August 2009		29 April 2018	Life peer	Speaker of the House of Commons (2000–2009)
The Lord Temple-Morris ‡	Labour	22 June 2001		1 May 2018	Life peer	
The Baroness Jowell, PC ‡	Labour	27 October 2015		12 May 2018	Life peer	Cabinet Minister (2001–2010)
The Lord Howie of Troon ‡	Labour	21 April 1978		26 May 2018	Life peer	Junior Minister
The Lord Wade of Chorlton	Conservative	16 May 1990	1 November 2016	7 June 2018	Life peer	
The Lord Thomas of Macclesfield	Labour	5 November 1997	18 May 2016	1 July 2018	Life peer	
The Lord Carrington, PC	Conservative	17 November 1999 (Note: Sat as an Hereditary peer: 19 November 1938–11 November 1999)		9 July 2018	Hereditary peer given a Life Peerage	Sat as Baron Carington of Upton; Secretary General of NATO (1984–1988); Foreign Secretary (1979–1982); Defence Secretary (1970–1974); Cabinet Minister (1963–1964, 1974); Leader of the Conservative Party in the House of Lords (1963–1970, 1974–1979)
The Lord Laird	Non-affiliated	16 July 1999		10 July 2018	Life peer	
The Lord Browne-Wilkinson, PC	Crossbencher	1 October 1991	1 March 2016	25 July 2018	Law life peer	Law Lord (1991–2000)
The Lord Mackay of Drumadoon, PC	Crossbencher	13 December 1995	17 January 2017	21 August 2018	Life peer	Senator of the College of Justice (2000–2013); Lord Advocate (1995–1997); Solicitor General (1995)
The Lord Vincent of Coleshill	Crossbencher	3 September 1996	9 March 2016	8 September 2018	Life peer	Chief of the Defence Staff (1991–1992)
The Baroness Trumpington, PC	Conservative	4 February 1980	24 October 2017	26 November 2018	Life peer	Junior Minister
The Baroness Hollis of Heigham, PC	Labour	1 June 1990		13 October 2018	Life peer	Junior Minister
The Lord Skelmersdale	Conservative	11 November 1999 (Note: Sat as an Hereditary peer: 21 July 1973–11 November 1999)		31 October 2018	Elected hereditary peer	Junior Minister
The Lord Heywood of Whitehall	Non-affiliated	26 October 2018		4 November 2018	Life peer	Died before taking his seat Cabinet Secretary (2012–2018)
The Lord Ashdown of Norton-sub-Hamdon, PC ‡	Liberal Democrat	10 July 2001		22 December 2018	Life peer	Leader of the Liberal Democrats (1988–1999)
The Lord Foster of Bishop Auckland, PC ‡	Labour	16 June 2005		6 January 2019	Life peer	Chief Whip of the Labour Party (1985–1995)
The Viscount Slim	Crossbencher	11 November 1999 (Note: Sat as an Hereditary peer: 14 December 1970–11 November 1999)		12 January 2019	Elected hereditary peer	
The Baroness Falkender, PC	Labour	11 July 1974		6 February 2019	Life peer	Political Secretary to the Prime Minister (1964–1970, 1974–1976)
The Lord Bhattacharyya	Labour	3 June 2004		1 March 2019	Life peer	
The Lord Davies of Coity	Labour	1 October 1997		4 March 2019	Life peer	General Secretary of the USDAW (1986–1997)
The Lord Habgood, PC	Crossbencher	7 September 1995	3 February 2011	6 March 2019	Life peer	Archbishop of York (1983–1995)
The Baroness Warnock	Crossbencher	6 February 1985	1 June 2015	20 March 2019	Life peer	
The Baroness Lockwood	Labour	27 February 1978	18 May 2017	29 April 2019	Life peer	
The Lord Moore of Lower Marsh, PC ‡	Conservative	3 July 1992		20 May 2019	Life peer	Cabinet Minister (1986–1989)
The Lord Patel of Blackburn	Labour	14 February 2000		29 May 2019	Life peer	
The Lord Spicer, PC ‡	Conservative	8 July 2010		29 May 2019	Life peer	Chairman of the 1922 Committee (2001–2010)
The Lord Tordoff	Liberal Democrat	11 May 1981	13 October 2016	22 June 2019	Life peer	Chairman of Committees (2001–2002); Chief Whip of the Liberal Party in the House of Lords (1984–1988); Chief Whip of the Liberal Democrats in the House of Lords (1988–1994)
The Lord Bell	Conservative	31 July 1998		25 August 2019	Life peer	
The Lord Northbourne	Crossbencher	11 November 1999 (Note: Sat as an Hereditary peer: 17 June 1982–11 November 1999)	4 September 2018	8 September 2019	Elected hereditary peer	
The Lord Nicholls of Birkenhead, PC	Crossbencher	3 October 1994	3 April 2017	25 September 2019	Law life peer	Law Lord (1994–2007)
The Lord Mawhinney, PC ‡	Conservative	24 June 2005		9 November 2019	Life peer	Cabinet Minister (1994–1997)
The Lord Bramall	Crossbencher	9 February 1987	25 April 2013	12 November 2019	Life peer	Chief of the Defence Staff (1982–1985)
The Lord Feldman	Conservative	15 January 1996	30 June 2016	19 November 2019	Life peer	
The Lord Williams of Elvel, PC	Labour	22 May 1985		30 December 2019	Life peer	

=== 2020–present ===
Member of the Privy Council

‡ former MP
# former MEP

Title	Party	Date joined	Resigned	Died	Type	Notes
The Viscount Montgomery of Alamein	Crossbencher	28 June 2005 (Note: Sat as an Hereditary peer: 24 March 1976–11 November 1999)	23 July 2015	8 January 2020	Elected hereditary peer	
The Lord Chalfont, PC	Crossbencher	11 November 1964	10 November 2015	10 January 2020	Life peer	Junior Minister
The Lord Maclennan of Rogart, PC ‡	Liberal Democrat	19 July 2001		18 January 2020	Life peer	Leader of the SDP (1987–1988); Junior Minister
The Lord Sheldon, PC ‡	Labour	22 June 2001	18 May 2015	2 February 2020	Life peer	Junior Minister
The Lord Wright of Richmond	Crossbencher	10 February 1994	17 December 2019	6 March 2020	Life peer	Civil Servant
The Lord Graham of Edmonton, PC ‡	Labour	12 September 1983		21 March 2020	Life peer	Junior Minister; Chief Whip of the Labour Party in the House of Lords (1990–1997)
The Lord Garel-Jones, PC ‡	Conservative	22 October 1997		24 March 2020	Life peer	Junior Minister
The Lord Gordon of Strathblane	Labour	4 October 1997		31 March 2020	Life peer	
The Lord Armstrong of Ilminster	Crossbencher	26 February 1988		3 April 2020	Life peer	Cabinet Secretary (1979–1987)
The Lord Tombs	Crossbencher	28 February 1990	31 March 2015	11 April 2020	Life peer	
The Lord May of Oxford	Crossbencher	18 July 2001	2 May 2017	28 April 2020	Life peer	
The Lord Eden of Winton, PC ‡	Conservative	3 October 1983	11 June 2015	23 May 2020	Life peer	Junior Minister
The Lord Rea	Labour	11 November 1999 (Note: Sat as an Hereditary peer: 22 April 1981–11 November 1999)		1 June 2020	Elected hereditary peer	
The Baroness Maddock ‡	Liberal Democrat	30 October 1997		27 June 2020	Life peer	also The Lady Beith (2015–2020)
The Lord Hutton, PC	Crossbencher	6 January 1997	23 April 2018	14 July 2020	Law life peer	Law Lord (1997–2004); Lord Chief Justice of Northern Ireland (1989–1997)
The Lord Lester of Herne Hill	Non-affiliated	13 October 1993	12 December 2018	8 August 2020	Life peer	
The Lord Renton of Mount Harry, PC ‡	Conservative	9 June 1997	14 April 2016	25 August 2020	Life peer	Government Chief Whip (1989–1990)
The Lord O'Neill of Clackmannan ‡	Labour	14 June 2005		26 August 2020	Life peer	
The Lord Shutt of Greetland, PC	Liberal Democrat	12 May 2000		30 October 2020	Life peer	Chief Whip of the Liberal Democrats in the House of Lords (2005–2012)
The Lord Sacks	Crossbencher	1 September 2009		7 November 2020	Life peer	Chief Rabbi (1991–2013)
The Lord Stoddart of Swindon ‡	Independent Labour	14 September 1983		14 November 2020	Life peer	Junior Minister
The Lord Kerr of Tonaghmore, PC	Non-affiliated	29 June 2009		1 December 2020	Law life peer	Justice of the Supreme Court of the United Kingdom (2009–2020); Law Lord (2009); Lord Chief Justice of Northern Ireland (2004–2009)
The Lord Shaw of Northstead ‡ #	Conservative	30 September 1994	31 March 2015	8 January 2021	Life peer	
The Lord Fraser of Corriegarth	Conservative	31 August 2016		6 February 2021	Life peer	
The Earl of Selborne	Non-affiliated	11 November 1999 (Note: Sat as an Hereditary peer: 3 September 1971–11 November 1999)	26 March 2020	12 February 2021	Elected hereditary peer	
The Lord Wolfson of Sunningdale	Conservative	26 March 1991	13 June 2017	10 March 2021	Life peer	Downing Street Chief of Staff (1979–1985)
The Lord Greaves	Liberal Democrat	4 May 2000		23 March 2021	Life peer	
The Baroness Williams of Crosby, PC ‡	Liberal Democrat	1 February 1993	11 February 2016	12 April 2021	Life peer	Cabinet Minister (1974–1979); Leader of the Liberal Democrats in the House of Lords (2001–2004)
The Lord Judd ‡	Labour	10 June 1991		17 April 2021	Life peer	Junior Minister
The Baroness O'Cathain	Conservative	21 June 1991		23 April 2021	Life peer	
The Lord Smith of Clifton	Liberal Democrat	4 November 1997	31 January 2019	24 April 2021	Life peer	
The Lord Walpole	Crossbencher	11 November 1999 (Note: Sat as an Hereditary peer: 25 February 1989–11 November 1999)	13 June 2017	8 May 2021	Elected hereditary peer	
The Lord Millett, PC	Crossbencher	1 October 1998	4 May 2017	27 May 2021	Law life peer	Law Lord (1998–2004)
The Earl Baldwin of Bewdley	Crossbencher	11 November 1999 (Note: Sat as an Hereditary peer: 5 July 1976–11 November 1999)	9 May 2018	16 June 2021	Elected hereditary peer	
The Lord Elystan-Morgan ‡	Crossbencher	27 May 1981	12 February 2020	7 July 2021	Life peer	Junior Minister
The Lord Smith of Leigh	Labour	5 August 1999		2 August 2021	Life peer	Leader of Wigan Council (1991–2018)
The Viscount Simon	Labour	11 November 1999 (Note: Sat as an Hereditary peer: 5 December 1993–11 November 1999)		15 August 2021	Elected hereditary peer	
The Lord Macfarlane of Bearsden	Conservative	29 July 1991	21 July 2016	5 November 2021	Life peer	
The Lord Denham, PC	Conservative	11 November 1999 (Note: Sat as an Hereditary peer: 30 November 1948–11 November 1999)	26 April 2021	1 December 2021	Elected hereditary peer	Junior Minister; Government Chief Whip in the House of Lords (1979–1991)
The Lord McKenzie of Luton	Labour	18 June 2004		2 December 2021	Life peer	Junior Minister
The Lord Rogers of Riverside	Labour	17 October 1996	11 May 2021	18 December 2021	Life peer	
The Lord Hughes of Woodside ‡	Labour	27 September 1997		7 January 2022	Life peer	Junior Minister
The Lord Sainsbury of Preston Candover	Conservative	31 January 1989		14 January 2022	Life peer	
The Lord Myners	Crossbencher	16 October 2008		16 January 2022	Life peer	Junior Minister
The Lord Fearn ‡	Liberal Democrat	11 July 2001	11 July 2018	24 January 2022	Life peer	
The Lord Chidgey ‡	Liberal Democrat	17 June 2005		15 February 2022	Life peer	
The Baroness Howe of Idlicote	Crossbencher	29 June 2001	2 June 2020	22 March 2022	Life peer	also The Lady Howe of Aberavon (1992–2015) also The Dowager Lady Howe of Aberavon (2015–2022)
The Baroness Knight of Collingtree ‡	Conservative	23 September 1997	24 March 2016	6 April 2022	Life peer	
The Lord Plumb #	Conservative	6 April 1987	3 November 2017	15 April 2022	Life peer	President of the European Parliament (1987–1989); Leader of the Conservatives in the European Parliament (1982–1987)
The Lord Cobbold	Crossbencher	15 October 2000 (Note: Sat as an Hereditary peer: 1 November 1987–11 November 1999)	13 October 2014	10 May 2022	Elected hereditary peer	
The Baroness Afshar	Crossbencher	11 December 2007		12 May 2022	Life peer	
The Baroness Sharples	Conservative	18 June 1973	18 December 2017	19 May 2022	Life peer	
The Lord Swinfen	Conservative	11 November 1999 (Note: Sat as an Hereditary peer: 19 March 1977–11 November 1999)		5 June 2022	Elected hereditary peer	
The Baroness Greengross	Crossbencher	10 February 2000		23 June 2022	Life peer	
The Lord Inge, PC	Crossbencher	21 July 1997	25 April 2016	20 July 2022	Life peer	Chief of the Defence Staff (1994–1997)
The Lord Trimble, PC ‡	Conservative	2 June 2006		25 July 2022	Life peer	First Minister of Northern Ireland (1998–2002); Leader of the Ulster Unionist Party (1995–2005)
The Earl of Home	Conservative	11 November 1999 (Note: Sat as an Hereditary peer: 9 October 1995–11 November 1999)		22 August 2022	Elected hereditary peer	
The Lord Radice, PC ‡	Labour	16 July 2001	1 August 2022	26 August 2022	Life peer	
The Lord Sheikh	Conservative	6 June 2006		22 September 2022	Life peer	
The Baroness Blood	Labour	31 July 1999	4 September 2018	21 October 2022	Life peer	Trade unionist
The Lord Boyce	Crossbencher	16 June 2003		6 November 2022	Life peer	Chief of the Defence Staff (2001–2003)
The Lord Jones of Cheltenham ‡	Liberal Democrat	20 June 2005		7 November 2022	Life peer	
The Lord Young of Graffham, PC	Conservative	10 October 1984	27 April 2022	9 December 2022	Life peer	Cabinet Minister (1984–1989)
The Baroness Couttie	Conservative	5 September 2016		12 December 2022	Life peer	Leader of Westminster City Council (2012–2017)
The Lord Ramsbotham	Crossbencher	17 May 2005		13 December 2022	Life peer	HM's Chief Inspector of Prisons (1995–2001)
The Baroness Linklater of Butterstone	Liberal Democrat	1 November 1997	12 February 2016	15 December 2022	Life peer	
The Baroness Boothroyd, PC ‡ #	Crossbencher	15 January 2001		26 February 2023	Life peer	Speaker of the House of Commons (1992–2000); Second Deputy Chairman of Ways and Means (1987–1992)
The Lord Pendry, PC ‡	Labour	4 July 2001		26 February 2023	Life peer	Junior Minister
The Baroness Masham of Ilton	Crossbencher	12 February 1970		12 March 2023	Life peer	also The Lady Masham (1970–1972) also The Countess of Swinton (1972–2006) also The Dowager Countess of Swinton (2006–2023)
The Earl of Crawford and Balcarres, PC ‡	Conservative	24 January 1975	28 November 2019	18 March 2023	Life peer	The Earl of Crawford and Balcarres was created a life peer in January 1975, before succeeding to the earldoms in December the same year. Junior Minister
The Lord Kirkhill	Labour	17 July 1975	30 April 2018	21 March 2023	Life peer	Junior Minister
The Lord Lawson of Blaby, PC ‡	Conservative	1 July 1992	31 December 2022	3 April 2023	Life peer	Chancellor of the Exchequer (1983–1989); Cabinet Minister (1981–1983)
The Lord Phillips of Sudbury	Liberal Democrat	25 July 1998	7 May 2015	9 April 2023	Life peer	
The Lord Carswell, PC	Crossbencher	12 January 2004	29 October 2019	4 May 2023	Law life peer	Law Lord (2004–2009); Lord Chief Justice of Northern Ireland (1997–2004)
The Lord Brooke of Sutton Mandeville, PC ‡	Conservative	30 July 2001	18 September 2015	13 May 2023	Life peer	Cabinet Minister (1989–1994)
The Lord Morris of Aberavon, PC ‡	Labour	3 July 2001		5 June 2023	Life peer	Attorney General (1997–1999); Cabinet Minister (1974–1979)
The Lord Clinton-Davis, PC ‡	Labour	8 May 1990	10 January 2018	11 June 2023	Life peer	European Commissioner (1985–1989); Junior Minister
The Viscount Tenby	Crossbencher	11 November 1999 (Note: Sat as an Hereditary peer: 4 July 1983–11 November 1999)	1 May 2015	12 June 2023	Elected hereditary peer	
The Baroness McDonagh	Labour	24 June 2004		24 June 2023	Life peer	General Secretary of the Labour Party (1998–2001)
The Lord Kerslake	Crossbencher	17 March 2015		1 July 2023	Life peer	Civil Servant
The Lord Brown of Eaton-under-Heywood, PC	Crossbencher	13 January 2004	19 June 2023	7 July 2023	Law life peer	Justice of the Supreme Court of the United Kingdom (2009–2012); Law Lord (2004–2009)
The Lord Palmer	Crossbencher	11 November 1999 (Note: Sat as an Hereditary peer: 26 June 1990–11 November 1999)		10 July 2023	Elected hereditary peer	
The Lord Elton	Conservative	11 November 1999 (Note: Sat as an Hereditary peer: 18 April 1973–11 November 1999)	29 October 2020	19 August 2023	Elected hereditary peer	Junior Minister
The Lord Brougham and Vaux	Conservative	11 November 1999 (Note: Sat as an Hereditary peer: 20 June 1967–11 November 1999)		27 August 2023	Elected hereditary peer	
The Lord Haworth	Labour	28 June 2004		28 August 2023	Life peer	
The Baroness Thomas of Walliswood	Liberal Democrat	6 October 1994	18 May 2016	6 October 2023	Life peer	
The Lord Elder	Labour	19 July 1999		24 October 2023	Life peer	
The Lord Judge, PC	Crossbencher	1 October 2008		7 November 2023	Life peer	Lord Chief Justice of England and Wales (2008–2013); Convenor of the Crossbench Peers (2019–2023)
The Lord Cotter ‡	Liberal Democrat	30 May 2006		14 November 2023	Life peer	
The Lord Rowe-Beddoe	Crossbencher	15 June 2006		15 November 2023	Life peer	
The Lord Walker of Gestingthorpe, PC	Crossbencher	1 October 2002	17 March 2021	16 November 2023	Law life peer	Justice of the Supreme Court of the United Kingdom (2009–2013); Law Lord (2002–2009)
The Lord Selkirk of Douglas, PC ‡	Conservative	29 September 1997	27 July 2023	28 November 2023	Life peer	Disclaimed the Earldom of Selkirk in 1994. Junior Minister
The Lord Darling of Roulanish, PC ‡	Labour	1 December 2015	28 July 2020	30 November 2023	Life peer	Chancellor of the Exchequer (2007–2010); Cabinet Minister (1997–2007)
The Baroness Kinnock of Holyhead, PC #	Labour	30 June 2009	9 April 2021	3 December 2023	Life peer	also The Lady Kinnock (2005–2023); Junior Minister
The Lord Bhatia	Non-affiliated	5 June 2001	7 November 2023	12 January 2024	Life peer	
The Lord Tomlinson ‡ #	Labour	21 July 1998		20 January 2024	Life peer	Junior Minister
The Baroness Flather	Crossbencher	11 June 1990		6 February 2024	Life peer	
The Lord Cormack ‡	Conservative	18 December 2010		25 February 2024	Life peer	
The Baroness Henig	Labour	8 June 2004		29 February 2024	Life peer	
The Lord McAvoy, PC ‡	Labour	22 June 2010		8 March 2024	Life peer	Junior Minister; Chief Whip of the Labour Party in the House of Lords (2018–2021)
The Lord Hoyle ‡	Labour	14 May 1997	25 July 2023	6 April 2024	Life peer	President of the ASTMS (1977–1981, 1985–1988); Chairman of the Parliamentary Labour Party (1992–1997); Junior Minister
The Lord Rosser	Labour	14 June 2004		10 April 2024	Life peer	General Secretary of the TSSA (1989–2004)
The Baroness Gardner of Parkes	Conservative	19 June 1981		14 April 2024	Life peer	
The Baroness Massey of Darwen	Labour	26 July 1999		20 April 2024	Life peer	
The Lord Field of Birkenhead, PC ‡	Crossbencher	11 September 2020		23 April 2024	Life peer	Junior Minister
The Lord Stunell, PC ‡	Liberal Democrat	26 October 2015		29 April 2024	Life peer	Junior Minister; Chief Whip of the Liberal Democrats (2001–2006)
The Lord Fellowes, PC	Crossbencher	12 July 1999	10 February 2022	29 July 2024	Life peer	Private Secretary to the Sovereign (1990–1999)
The Lord Colwyn	Conservative	11 November 1999 (Note: Sat as an Hereditary peer: 29 May 1966–11 November 1999)	21 July 2022	4 August 2024	Elected hereditary peer	
The Lady Saltoun	Crossbencher	11 November 1999 (Note: Sat as an Hereditary peer: 31 August 1979–11 November 1999)	12 December 2014	3 September 2024	Elected hereditary peer	
The Lord Selsdon	Conservative	11 November 1999 (Note: Sat as an Hereditary peer: 7 February 1963–11 November 1999)	11 May 2021	15 September 2024	Elected hereditary peer	
The Marquess of Lothian, PC ‡	Conservative	22 November 2010		1 October 2024	Hereditary peer given a Life Peerage	Sat as Baron Kerr of Monteviot; Junior Minister
The Lord Ouseley	Crossbencher	26 June 2001	24 May 2019	2 October 2024	Life peer	
The Lord Leitch	Labour	7 June 2004		4 October 2024	Life peer	
The Lord Harrison #	Labour	28 July 1999	11 July 2022	18 October 2024	Life peer	
The Lord Hanningfield	Non-affiliated	31 July 1998		20 October 2024	Life peer	Leader of Essex County Council
The Lord Renwick of Clifton	Crossbencher	26 September 1997	31 March 2018	4 November 2024	Life peer	Diplomat
The Lord Prescott ‡ #	Labour	7 July 2010	9 July 2024	20 November 2024	Life peer	Deputy Prime Minister (1997–2007); Leader of the European Parliamentary Labour Party (1976–1979)
The Lord Renfrew of Kaimsthorn	Conservative	24 June 1991	15 September 2021	24 November 2024	Life peer	
The Baroness Wilkins	Labour	30 July 1999	23 July 2015	1 December 2024	Life peer	
The Lord Lloyd of Berwick, PC	Crossbencher	1 October 1993	27 March 2015	8 December 2024	Law life peer	Law Lord (1993–1998)
The Baroness Oppenheim-Barnes, PC ‡	Conservative	9 February 1989	25 February 2019	1 January 2025	Life peer	Junior Minister
The Baroness Randerson	Liberal Democrat	27 January 2011		4 January 2025	Life peer	
The Lord Davies of Stamford ‡	Labour	7 July 2010	25 July 2023	13 January 2025	Life peer	Junior Minister
The Lord Brookman	Labour	30 July 1998	2 April 2020	22 January 2025	Life peer	General Secretary of the ISTC (1993–1999)
The Baroness Hanham	Conservative	15 July 1999	22 July 2020	24 January 2025	Life peer	Junior Minister
The Lord Cameron of Lochbroom, PC	Crossbencher	8 June 1984	21 April 2016	28 January 2025	Life peer	Senator of the College of Justice (1989–2003); Lord Advocate (1984–1989)
The Earl of Sandwich	Crossbencher	11 November 1999 (Note: Sat as an Hereditary peer: 25 February 1995–11 November 1999)	20 May 2024	1 February 2025	Elected hereditary peer	
The Lord Elis-Thomas, PC ‡	Non-affiliated	18 September 1992		7 February 2025	Life peer	
The Baroness Howarth of Breckland	Crossbencher	25 June 2001		23 March 2025	Life peer	
The Lord Kalms	Non-affiliated	1 June 2004	9 July 2024	30 March 2025	Life peer	
The Viscount Craigavon	Crossbencher	11 November 1999 (Note: Sat as an Hereditary peer: 18 May 1974–11 November 1999)		31 March 2025	Elected hereditary peer	
The Lord Etherton, PC	Crossbencher	23 December 2020		6 May 2025	Life peer	Master of the Rolls (2016—2021)
The Lord Freeman, PC ‡	Conservative	29 October 1997	1 October 2020	2 June 2025	Life peer	Cabinet Minister (1995–1997)
The Lord Lipsey	Labour	30 July 1999		1 July 2025	Life peer	
The Lord Tebbit, PC ‡	Conservative	6 July 1992	31 March 2022	7 July 2025	Life peer	Cabinet Minister (1981–1987)
The Lord Blair of Boughton	Crossbencher	20 July 2010		9 July 2025	Life peer	Commissioner of the Metropolitan Police (2005–2008)
The Lord Marlesford	Conservative	7 June 1991		13 July 2025	Life peer	
The Lord Alliance	Liberal Democrat	1 July 2004	21 March 2025	18 July 2025	Life peer	
The Lord Desai	Crossbencher	5 June 1991		29 July 2025	Life peer	
The Lord Sawyer	Labour	4 August 1998		3 August 2025	Life peer	Deputy General Secretary of the NUPE (1981–1993); Deputy General Secretary of Unison (1993–1994); General Secretary of the Labour Party (1994–1998)
The Lord Paul, PC	Non-affiliated	9 October 1996		21 August 2025	Life peer	Junior Minister
The Lord Boswell of Aynho ‡	Non-affiliated	8 July 2010	24 July 2025	30 August 2025	Life peer	
The Lord Howarth of Newport, PC ‡	Labour	15 June 2005		10 September 2025	Life peer	Junior Minister
The Lord Guthrie of Craigiebank	Crossbencher	27 June 2001	1 December 2020	18 September 2025	Life peer	Chief of the Defence Staff (1997–2001)
The Lord Campbell of Pittenweem, PC ‡	Liberal Democrat	13 October 2015		26 September 2025	Life peer	Leader of the Liberal Democrats (2006–2007)
The Baroness Howells of Saint Davids	Labour	21 July 1999	10 January 2019	14 October 2025	Life peer	
The Lord Taverne	Liberal Democrat	5 February 1996	7 March 2025	25 October 2025	Life peer	Junior Minister
The Baroness Newlove	Conservative	14 July 2010		11 November 2025	Life peer	
The Lord Maxton	Labour	17 June 2004	5 May 2025	20 November 2025	Life peer	
The Lord Higgins, PC ‡	Conservative	28 October 1997	1 January 2019	25 November 2025	Life peer	Junior Minister
The Lord Flight ‡	Conservative	13 January 2011		24 January 2026	Life peer	
The Lord Wallace of Tankerness, PC ‡	Liberal Democrat	17 October 2007		29 January 2026	Life peer	Advocate General (2010–2015); Leader of the Liberal Democrats in the House of Lords (2013–2016); Chief Whip of the Liberal Democrats (1988–1992); Chief Whip of the Liberal Party (1987–1988)
The Lord Triesman	Labour	9 January 2004		30 January 2026	Life peer	General Secretary of the Labour Party (2001–2003); General Secretary of the AUT (1993–2001); Junior Minister
The Baroness Emerton	Crossbencher	17 February 1997	1 November 2019	27 February 2026	Life peer	
The Baroness Fritchie	Crossbencher	31 May 2005	1 July 2024	12 March 2026	Life peer	
The Lord Haskins	Crossbencher	25 July 1998	1 December 2020	26 March 2026	Life peer	
The Lord Beecham	Labour	20 July 2010	1 September 2021	9 April 2026	Life peer	Leader of Newcastle City Council (1977–1994)
The Viscount Bridgeman	Conservative	11 November 1999 (Note: Sat as an Hereditary peer: 17 November 1982–11 November 1999)		9 April 2026	Elected hereditary peer	
The Lord Skidelsky	Crossbencher	15 July 1991		15 April 2026	Life peer	
The Lord Clarke of Stone-cum-Ebony PC	Crossbencher	29 May 2009	14 September 2020	16 April 2026	Life peer	Justice of the Supreme Court of the United Kingdom (2009–2017); Master of the Rolls (2005–2009)
The Lord Hunt of Chesterton	Labour	5 May 2000	30 October 2021	20 April 2026	Life peer	
The Lord Harries of Pentregarth	Crossbencher	30 June 2006		29 April 2026	Life peer	Bishop of Oxford (1987–2006)
The Baroness Ramsay of Cartvale	Labour	11 October 1996		28 May 2026	Life peer	Junior Minister
The Lord Haselhurst, PC ‡	Conservative	22 June 2018	20 December 2024	1 June 2026	Life peer	Chairman of Ways and Means (1997–2010)
The Lord Hattersley, PC ‡	Labour	24 November 1997	19 May 2017	13 June 2026	Life peer	Cabinet Minister (1976–1979)
The Lord Sanderson of Bowden	Conservative	5 June 1985	29 March 2018	2 July 2026	Life peer	Junior Minister
The Lord Mackay of Clashfern, PC	Conservative	6 July 1979	22 July 2022	7 July 2026	Life peer	Lord Clerk Register (2007–2022); Lord High Chancellor of Great Britain (1987–1997); Law Lord (1985–1987); Senator of the College of Justice (1984–1985); Lord Advocate (1979–1984)
The Lord Christopher	Labour	30 July 1998	13 May 2026	11 July 2026	Life peer	General Secretary of the IRSF (1976–1988); President of the Trades Union Congress (1989)
The Lord Laming, PC	Crossbencher	27 July 1998		15 July 2026	Life peer	Convenor of the Crossbench Peers (2011–2015); Chairman of Committees (2015–2016)
The Lord Horam ‡	Conservative	4 September 2013		24 July 2026	Life peer	Junior Minister. Previously in the Labour Party until 1981.
The Lord Snape ‡	Labour	9 June 2004		13 August 2026	Life peer	
The Lord Archer of Weston-super-Mare	Non-affiliated	27 July 1992	4 July 2024	5 October 2026	Life peer	
The Earl of Lindsay	Conservative	11 November 1999 (Note: Sat as an Hereditary peer: 1 October 1989–11 November 1999)	29 April 2026	9 October 2026	Elected hereditary peer	
The Lord Davies of Oldham	Labour	3 October 1997	9 July 2024	27 October 2026	Life peer	Junior Minister

=== Deceased Lords Spiritual ===
This is a list of the Lords Spiritual who died after the year 2000.

==== Deceased Lords Spiritual ex officio ====
Member of the Privy Council

Bishopric	Bishop	Resigned	Died	Introduced	Notes
Lord Archbishop of Canterbury	Donald Coggan, PC	25 January 1980	17 May 2000	12 December 1974	Created a Life peer in 1980.
Lord Archbishop of Canterbury	Donald Coggan, PC	25 January 1980	17 May 2000	12 December 1974	Translated from York: 8 November 1961
Lord Archbishop of Canterbury	Robert Runcie, MC, PC	31 January 1991	11 July 2000	12 March 1980	Created a Life peer in 1991.
Lord Archbishop of Canterbury	Robert Runcie, MC, PC	31 January 1991	11 July 2000	12 March 1980	Translated from Saint Albans: 21 November 1973
Lord Archbishop of York	John Habgood, PC	7 September 1995	6 March 2019	8 November 1983	Created a Life peer in 1995.
Lord Archbishop of York	John Habgood, PC	7 September 1995	6 March 2019	8 November 1983	Translated from Durham: 4 July 1973
Lord Bishop of London	Graham Leonard, KCVO, PC	8 May 1991	6 January 2010	22 July 1981	Translated from Durham: 23 November 1977
Lord Bishop of Durham	David Jenkins	6 July 1994	4 September 2016	14 November 1984	
Lord Bishop of Winchester	John Taylor	28 February 1985	30 January 2001	12 February 1975	
Lord Bishop of Winchester	Colin James	14 November 1995	10 December 2009	24 July 1985	Translated from Wakefield: 27 October 1982
Lord Bishop of Winchester	Michael Scott-Joynt	31 May 2011	27 September 2014	12 February 1996	

==== Deceased Lords Spiritual by virtue of seniority of service ====
Bishopric	Bishop	Resigned	Died	Introduced	Notes
Lord Bishop of Bath and Wells	John Bickersteth, KCVO	31 October 1987	29 January 2018	25 November 1981	
Lord Bishop of Bath and Wells	Jim Thompson	31 December 2001	19 September 2003	24 June 1997	
Lord Bishop of Birmingham	Hugh Montefiore	1 April 1987	13 May 2005	12 December 1984	
Lord Bishop of Birmingham	Mark Santer	31 May 2002	14 August 2024	14 December 1994	
Lord Bishop of Blackburn					
Lord Bishop of Bradford	David Smith	31 July 2002	28 January 2024	25 November 1997	
Lord Bishop of Bristol					
Lord Bishop of Carlisle	David Halsey	1989	16 May 2009	19 May 1976	
Lord Bishop of Carlisle	Ian Harland	31 May 2000	27 December 2008	5 March 1996	
Lord Bishop of Chelmsford	John Waine, KCVO	30 April 1999	29 December 2020	16 July 1986	Translation from Saint Edmundsbury and Ipswich: 30 April 1985
Lord Bishop of Chester					
Lord Bishop of Chichester	Roger Wilson, KCVO	1974	1 March 2002	18 June 1958	Translation from Wakefield: 16 November 1955
Lord Bishop of Chichester	Eric Kemp	31 January 2001	28 November 2009	28 November 1979	
Lord Bishop of Coventry	John Gibbs	1985	20 December 2007	17 February 1982	
Lord Bishop of Coventry	Simon Barrington-Ward, KCMG	1 October 1997	11 April 2020	12 November 1991	
Lord Bishop of Coventry	Colin Bennetts	31 January 2008	10 July 2013	9 July 2003	
Lord Bishop of Derby	Jonathan Bailey, KCVO	31 May 2005	9 December 2008	30 November 1999	
Lord Bishop of Ely	Edward Roberts	1977	29 July 2001	8 November 1972	
Lord Bishop of Ely	Peter Walker	1990	28 December 2010	25 July 1984	
Lord Bishop of Ely	Stephen Sykes	1999	24 September 2014	10 December 1996	
Lord Bishop of Ely	Anthony Russell	28 February 2010	9 July 2025	10 December 2007	
Lord Bishop of Exeter	Eric Mercer	1985	8 November 2003	26 June 1978	
Lord Bishop of Exeter	Hewlett Thompson	1999	13 May 2025	21 February 1990	
Lord Bishop of Gloucester	John Yates	1992	26 February 2008	25 November 1981	
Lord Bishop of Gloucester	David Bentley	31 December 2003	4 March 2020	22 April 1998	
Lord Bishop of Gloucester	Michael Perham	21 November 2014	17 April 2017	1 December 2009	
Lord Bishop of Guildford	Michael Adie, CBE	1994	4 March 2024	13 January 1988	
Lord Bishop of Guildford	Andrew Watson	3 March 2026	3 March 2026	9 February 2022	
Lord Bishop of Hereford					
Lord Bishop of Leicester	Richard Rutt, CBE	1991	27 July 2011	2 July 1985	
Lord Bishop of Lichfield	Keith Sutton	13 May 2003	24 March 2017	1 February 1989	
Lord Bishop of Lichfield	Jonathan Gledhill	30 September 2015	1 November 2021	3 November 2009	
Lord Bishop of Lincoln	Simon Phipps, MC	1987	29 January 2001	11 June 1980	
Lord Bishop of Lincoln	Bob Hardy, CBE	31 October 2001	9 April 2021	2 February 1993	
Lord Bishop of Liverpool	David Sheppard	18 October 1997	5 March 2005	3 December 1980	Created a Life peer in 1998.
Lord Bishop of Manchester					
Lord Bishop of Newcastle	Alec Graham	1997	9 May 2021	20 November 1985	
Lord Bishop of Norwich	Maurice Wood, DSC	1985	24 June 2007	28 October 1975	
Lord Bishop of Norwich	Peter Nott	1999	20 August 2018	12 November 1991	
Lord Bishop of Oxford	Kenneth Woollcombe	1978	3 March 2008	11 December 1974	
Lord Bishop of Oxford	Patrick Rodger	1986	8 July 2002	29 November 1978	Translation from Manchester: 26 March 1974
Lord Bishop of Oxford	Richard Harries	2 June 2006	29 April 2026	8 December 1993	Created a Life peer in 2006.
Lord Bishop of Peterborough	Ian Cundy	7 May 2009	7 May 2009	28 March 2001	
Lord Bishop of Portsmouth	Ronald Gordon	1984	8 August 2015	7 October 1981	
Lord Bishop of Portsmouth	Kenneth Stevenson	30 September 2009	12 January 2011	30 November 1999	
Lord Bishop of Ripon and Leeds	David Young, CBE	1999	10 August 2008	11 April 1984	
Lord Bishop of Rochester	David Say, KCVO	1988	14 September 2006	25 November 1969	
Lord Bishop of Saint Albans	John Taylor	1995	1 June 2016	23 October 1985	
Lord Bishop of Saint Edmundsbury and Ipswich	John Dennis	1996	13 April 2020	14 January 1992	
Lord Bishop of Saint Edmundsbury and Ipswich	Richard Lewis	31 July 2007	19 September 2020	23 January 2002	
Lord Bishop of Salisbury	John Baker	1993	4 June 2014	19 November 1986	
Lord Bishop of Sheffield	David Lunn	1997	19 July 2021	24 July 1985	
Lord Bishop of Southwark	Ronald Bowlby	1991	21 December 2019	14 January 1981	Translation from Newcastle: 15 December 1976
Lord Bishop of Southwark	Roy Williamson	1998	17 September 2019	18 February 1992	Translation from Bradford: 22 June 1988
Lord Bishop of Southwell and Nottingham	Denis Wakeling, MC	1985	10 October 2004	19 June 1974	
Lord Bishop of Southwell and Nottingham	Patrick Harris	1999	26 December 2020	6 February 1996	
Lord Bishop of Southwell and Nottingham	George Cassidy	31 August 2009	29 March 2024	21 January 2004	
Lord Bishop of Truro	Bill Ind	30 April 2008	22 April 2026	16 October 2002	
Lord Bishop of Wakefield					
Lord Bishop of Worcester	Philip Goodrich	1996	22 January 2001	27 October 1987	

== See also ==
- List of current members of the House of Lords
- List of life peerages
- List of excepted hereditary peers
- List of hereditary peers in the House of Lords by virtue of a life peerage
- List of hereditary peers removed under the House of Lords Act 1999
- Women in the House of Lords
- List of former members of the House of Lords (1970–1999)
