= Cumberlidge =

Cumberlidge is a surname. Notable people with the surname include:

- Arthur Cumberlidge (1914–1983), English footballer
- David Cumberlidge (born 1996), English swimmer
- Charlie Cumberlidge (born 2003), Australian basketball player

== See also ==
- Cumberlege
