= List of former members of the House of Lords (1970–1999) =

This is a list of former members of the House of Lords, the upper house of the Parliament of the United Kingdom, who ceased serving between 1970 and 1999.

== Living ==
Apart from retired Lords Spiritual, there are a number of living hereditary peers excluded under the House of Lords Act 1999 and have permanently ceased to be members of the House.

=== Removed under the House of Lords Act 1999 ===
Member of the Privy Council

‡ former MP
# former MEP

Title	Party	Date joined	Resigned	Type	Notes
The Prince of Wales		11 February 1970	11 November 1999	Hereditary peer	King of the United Kingdom and 14 other Commonwealth realm since 8 September 2022
The Duke of York		11 February 1987	11 November 1999	Hereditary peer	Member of the British royal family
The Duke of Gloucester		23 October 1974	11 November 1999	Hereditary peer	Member of the British royal family
The Duke of Kent		9 December 1959	11 November 1999	Hereditary peer	Member of the British royal family
The Duke of St Albans	Conservative	8 October 1988	11 November 1999	Hereditary peer	
The Duke of Rutland	Conservative	12 May 1999	11 November 1999	Hereditary peer	
The Duke of Northumberland	Conservative	25 June 1996	11 November 1999	Hereditary peer	
The Duke of Abercorn	Conservative	25 October 1979	11 November 1999	Hereditary peer	Sat as Marquess of Abercorn
The Marquess of Huntly	Conservative	13 January 1988	11 November 1999	Hereditary peer	
The Marquess of Queensberry	Non-affiliated	12 May 1965	11 November 1999	Hereditary peer	
The Marquess of Lansdowne	Conservative	13 October 1999	11 November 1999	Hereditary peer	
The Marquess of Hertford	Crossbencher	21 April 1999	11 November 1999	Hereditary peer	
The Marquess of Exeter	Crossbencher	26 April 1989	11 November 1999	Hereditary peer	
The Marquess of Northampton	Conservative	16 November 1978	11 November 1999	Hereditary peer	

=== Former Lords Spiritual ===
Twenty-six bishops of the Church of England sit in the House of Lords: the Archbishops of Canterbury and of York, the Bishops of London, of Durham and of Winchester, and the next 21 most senior diocesan bishops (with the exception of the Bishop in Europe and the Bishop of Sodor and Man). All bishops are required to retire at the age of 70.

==== Lords Spiritual ex officio ====
Member of the Privy Council

Bishopric	Bishop	Resigned	Introduced	Notes

==== Lords Spiritual by virtue of seniority of service ====
Bishopric	Bishop	Resigned	Introduced	Notes

== Deceased ==
The following life peers, hereditary peers and Lords Spiritual who have died or retired from the House of Lords between 1970 and 1999:

=== 1970–1979 ===
Member of the Privy Council

‡ former MP
# former MEP

Title	Party	Date joined	Resigned	Died	Type	Notes
The Earl of Avon	Conservative	12 July 1961		14 January 1977	Hereditary peer	Former Prime Minister (1955–1957)

=== 1980–1989 ===
Member of the Privy Council

‡ former MP
# former MEP

Title	Party	Date joined	Resigned	Died	Type	Notes
The Earl of Stockton	Conservative	24 February 1984		29 December 1986	Hereditary peer	Former Prime Minister (1957–1963)

=== 1990–1999 ===
Member of the Privy Council

‡ former MP
# former MEP

Title	Party	Date joined	Resigned	Died	Type	Notes
The Lord Wilson of Rievaulx	Labour	16 September 1983		23 May 1995	Life peer	Former Prime Minister (1964–1970, 1974–1976)
The Lord Home of the Hirsel	Conservative	24 December 1974		9 October 1995	Life peer	Former Prime Minister (1963–1964); Sat as hereditary peer, the 14th Earl of Home, 1951–1963 (disclaimed 1963)

=== 2000–2009 ===
Member of the Privy Council

‡ former MP
# former MEP

Title	Party	Date joined	Resigned	Died	Type	Notes

=== 2010–2019 ===
Member of the Privy Council

‡ former MP
# former MEP

Title	Party	Date joined	Resigned	Died	Type	Notes

=== 2020–present ===
Member of the Privy Council

‡ former MP
# former MEP

Title	Party	Date joined	Resigned	Died	Type	Notes
The Duke of Edinburgh	none	21 July 1948	11 November 1999	9 April 2021	Hereditary peer	Member of the British royal family

unfinished

=== Deceased Lords Spiritual ===
This is a list of the Lords Spiritual who died or retired from the House of Lords between 1970 and 1999.
