= Barry Cumberlege =

English cricketer and rugby union player

- Born: Barry Stephenson Cumberlege; 5 June 1891 Jesmond, Newcastle upon Tyne, Northumberland
- Died: 22 September 1970 (aged 79) Sandgate, Kent

Rugby union career
- Position: Fullback
International career
Years	Team	Apps	(Points)
1920–1922	England	8	(2)

Barry Stephenson Cumberlege, OBE (5 June 1891 – 22 September 1970) was an English sportsman who played international rugby union for England. He also played first-class cricket and served in the British Army in the First World War.

== Early life and education ==
Cumberlege was born at Jesmond in Newcastle upon Tyne in 1891, the son of Esther and Charles Cumberlege. His father was a superintendent at the Bank of England and had played cricket for Northumberland and Surrey.

He was educated at Durham School where he played both rugby union and cricket, captaining the school cricket team from 1908 to 1910. He was invited to tour South Africa with the Great Britain rugby team which he declined. He went on to Emmanuel College, Cambridge, graduating in 1913.

Cumberlege won both cricket and rugby Blues at Cambridge. His rugby Blue was won as a freshman in 1910 and he played for the university each year, captaining the team in 1912–13. Cumberlege played as a fullback. He was captain against the touring South African team in 1912–13. Having played in the Minor Counties Championship for Durham and Northumberland between 1909 and 1912, Cumberlege made his first-class cricket debut for the university in 1913. He played seven times during 1913 for the university and also made an appearance for Free Foresters against Cambridge, scoring the only century of his first-class career, an innings of 172.

== Military service ==
After graduating Cumberlege became a school teacher. He enlisted five days after World War I started and was commissioned as a 2nd Lieutenant in the Army Service Corps at the beginning of September 1914. He joined the 414 Mechanical Transport Company attached to the supply column of the 3rd Cavalry Division, serving in Belgium and Northern France from 1914 to 1916. He was promoted to Lieutenant and then to Temporary Captain in May 1916 before being granted three weeks leave on medical grounds at the end of 1916.

On his return to action in January 1917, Cumberlege moved to serve with the supply column of II ANZAC Corps. He served at Messines in June 1917 and later in the summer was appointed the commanding officer of the New Zealand Division supply column, serving in the Ypres area throughout the winter of 1917–18 and having his rank confirmed before being promoted to acting Major in March 1918. He served until the end of the war and was mentioned in dispatches and awarded an OBE in 1918. He was demobilised in April 1919 and resigned his commission in January 1920, being granted the rank of Major. During World War II Cumberlege served in the Royal Observer Corps.

== Post-war sporting career ==
After the war, Cumberlege played rugby for Blackheath and was called up to the England team for the 1920 Five Nations Championship. He made his international debut at fullback against Wales in the first Five Nations Championships since the end of the war. He was capped eight times by England, playing in the 1920, 1921 and 1922 championships, and was described by William Wakefield as "by far the best full-back we [England] have had since the war" in 1928. He was dropped after England suffered a heavy defeat to Wales in 1922 at Cardiff and retired from international rugby. Cumberlege also played for the Barbarians and for Northumberland in the County Championship. After his playing career was over he became a rugby referee, officiating in 16 international matches between 1926 and 1934.

He played a total of six first-class cricket matches for Kent County Cricket Club in 1923 and 1924. He scored 288 runs in nine innings for the county, with a highest score of 76 against Essex at Leyton, and only failed to reach double figures once. These matches brought his final tally to 14 first-class matches from which he scored 763 runs at a batting average of 38.15. With an "orthodox technique founded on a sound defence", he played club cricket for Blackheath and Band of Brothers.

== Family and professional life ==
Two of Cumberlege's brothers, Rutland and Royston, played cricket for Northumberland and Durham. Rutland also played rugby union for Cambridge University, Barbarians and Harlequins. Another brother, Henry, also served in the Army Service Corps, commanding another of the Mechanical Transport Companies of the 3rd Cavalry Division before his death in September 1914.

After leaving the Army at the end of World War I, Cumberlege worked as an underwriter for Lloyd's of London and wrote about rugby in the press. He married Louella Gillis in Kensington in June 1919, remarrying after her death in 1950. During World War II he served with the Royal Observer Corps. Cumberlege died in September 1970 aged 79.

== Bibliography ==
- Carlaw, Derek (2020). Kent County Cricketers, A to Z: Part Two (1919–1939) (PDF). Cardiff: ACS.
