= Pregnancy Sickness Support =

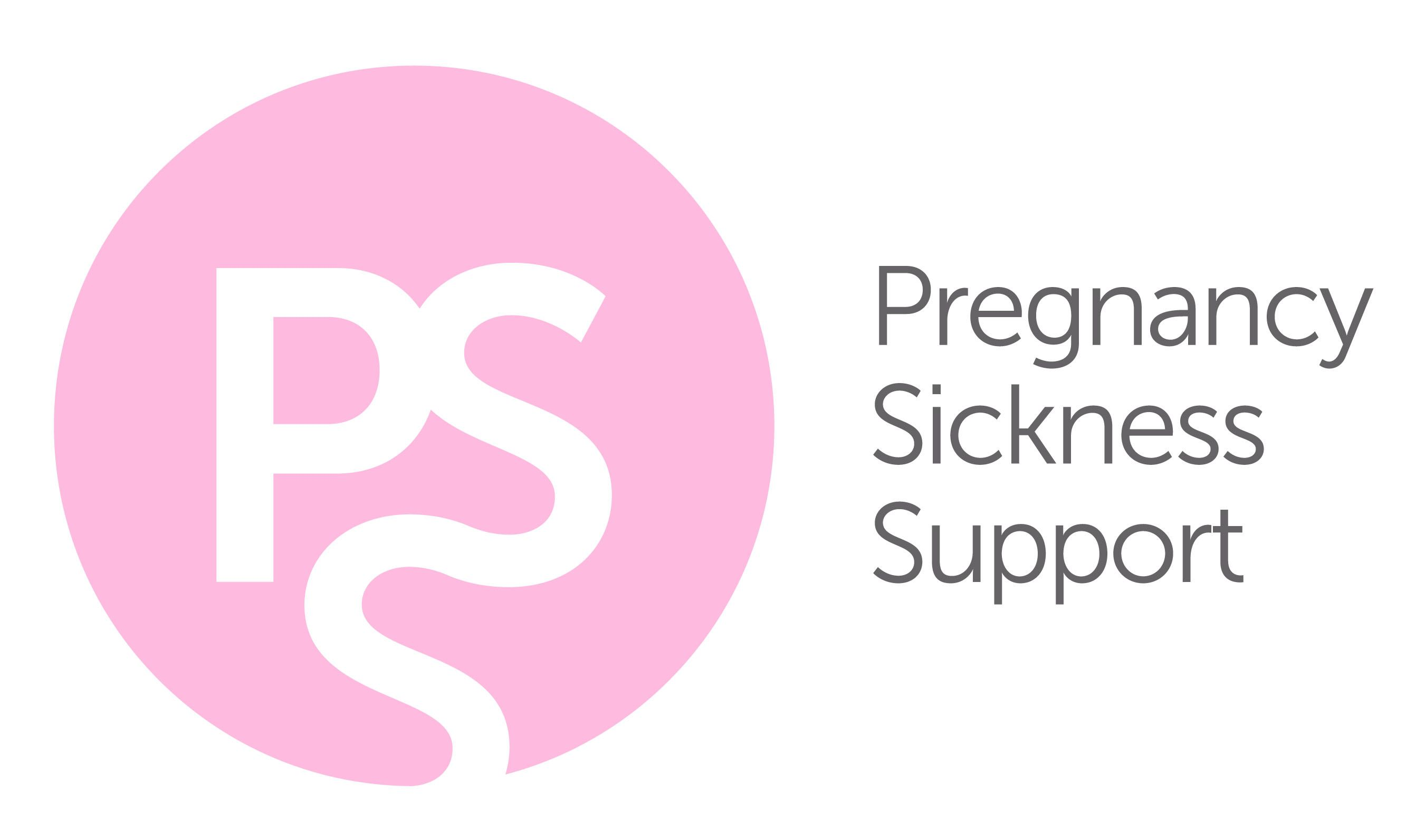
The Pregnancy Sickness Support Logo

Pregnancy Sickness Support is a UK charity supporting women experiencing nausea and vomiting in pregnancy and Hyperemesis gravidarum.

== History ==
Pregnancy Sickness Support was registered as a Charitable Trust in 2002 by founders Dr. Anthony Barnie-Adshead, his daughter Caroline Adshead and Dr. Roger Gadsby. Dr. Barnie-Adshead had become interested in pregnancy sickness and hyperemesis gravidarum in the 1960s during his career as a GP and initiated novel research trying to find the cause.

In 2014, Caitlin Dean was appointed as a trustee and currently holds the chair.

== Aims ==
The goal of the charity is to help those experiencing nausea and vomiting in pregnancy and hyperemesis gravidarum with:

- The development of a helpline to give information and support.
- The production of leaflets to explain pregnancy sickness with helpful information for sufferers and carers.
- Offering information about treatments available for pregnancy sickness and hyperemesis gravidarum.
- Provision of resources and information to educate doctors and healthcare professionals about the condition.
- Raising awareness of pregnancy sickness and hyperemesis gravidarum amongst the general public through articles and information.
- Encouragement of further research into the condition, its impact and its treatments.

== Awareness Raising ==
Since the Duchess of Cambridge suffered hyperemesis gravidarum in 2012, media interest in the condition has grown significantly. Chairperson Caitlin Dean has spoken on BBC Breakfast News, Radio 5Live, BBC Scotland, Woman's Hour and This Morning representing the charity.

In 2015 the charity produced a joint report with the British Pregnancy Advisory Service which addresses the issue of women terminating for hyperemesis gravidarum and the difficulty they face in accessing treatment.

== Awards ==
In 2015, chairperson Caitlin Dean won the Third Sector Awards Charity Chairperson of the Year. In 2017, the charity was shortlisted for "Small Charity, Big Achiever" for their collaboration with BPAS.
