= Cumberlege Commission =

Ecclesiastical commission chaired by Julia Cumberlege

The Cumberlege Commission was an ecclesiastical commission chaired by Julia Cumberlege, Baroness Cumberlege, in 2006–2007. Its goal was to review the Catholic Church in England and Wales' policies in the prevention of child sexual abuse. The commission carried out its activities five years on from the independent review by Lord Nolan. It published its report, Safeguarding with Confidence, in July 2007.
