= Julia Cumberlege, Baroness Cumberlege =

British Conservative Party politician and businesswoman (born 1943)

The Right Honourable The Baroness Cumberlege CBE DSG DL
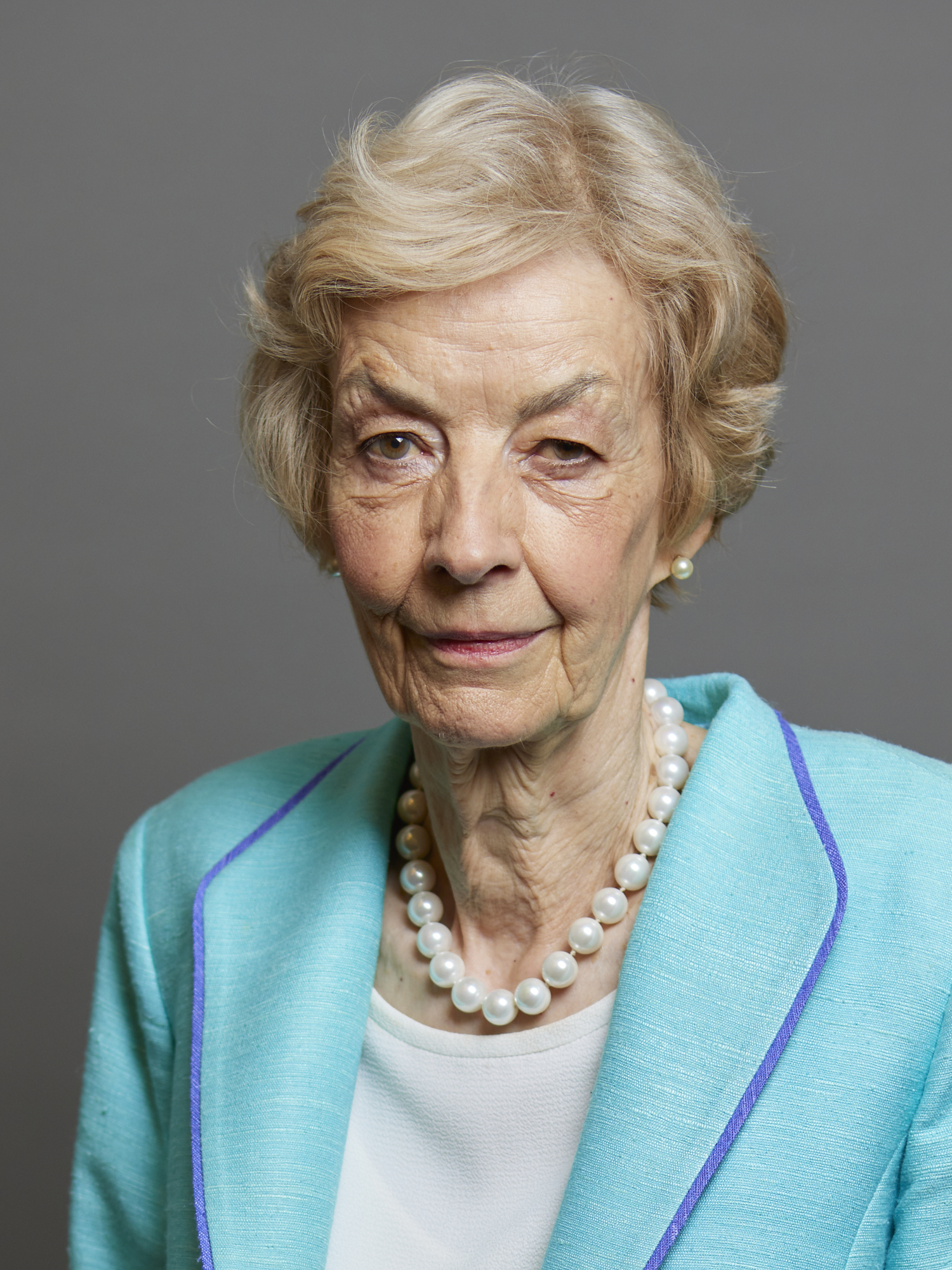
- Official portrait, 2021

Member of the House of Lords
- Lord Temporal
- Life peerage 18 May 1990 – 20 December 2024

Parliamentary Under-Secretary of State for Health
- In office 14 April 1992 – 2 May 1997
- Prime Minister: John Major
- Preceded by: The Baroness Hooper
- Succeeded by: The Baroness Jay of Paddington (as minister of state)

Personal details
- Born: 27 January 1943 (age 83)
- Party: Conservative

Julia Frances Cumberlege, Baroness Cumberlege, CBE, DSG, DL (née Camm; born 27 January 1943) is a former British Conservative Party politician and businesswoman. She was created a life peer on 18 May 1990 as Baroness Cumberlege, of Newick in the County of East Sussex. She retired from the House of Lords on 20 December 2024.

== Early life and education ==
Daughter of Lambert Ulrich Camm (né Kamm; d. 1997), of Appleton, Newick, East Sussex, general practitioner, the first medical officer for Plumpton Racecourse and formerly of the Indian Medical Service, and Mary Geraldine (née Russell), she was educated at the Convent of the Sacred Heart School, at Tunbridge Wells, Kent.

== Career ==
After her marriage in 1961 and raising her three sons, Cumberlege served in local government as a justice of the peace for East Sussex from 1973 to 1985, and a member of East Sussex County Council from 1974 to 1985. She was appointed CBE in 1985, and served as a Deputy Lieutenant of East Sussex from 1986 to 1991.

As chair of a review team commissioned by the Department of Health and Social Security, Cumberlege produced the Cumberlege Report in 1986 which, among other things, recommended that nurses should be able to prescribe some drugs. From 1987 to 1989, she was a member of the DHSS Expert Advisory Group on AIDS.

In 1992 she was appointed a Junior Health Minister and for five years covered all health and social services matters in the House of Lords. Two years later, she vetoed a major Health Education Authority campaign on condom use, "the first attempt for two years to target the general population at risk of HIV", on the grounds that the poster, press and cinema ads "could cause offence" although there had been no evidence of that when testing the campaign.

She was also the Sponsor Minister for the city of Plymouth responsible for regeneration and a budget of £45 million per year. In 1997 she was Opposition Spokesperson for Health.

In the House of Lords in 2000 on the subject of the Britain's National Health Service, remarking that "We are all trapped in a marvellously pure ideology, the ideal socialist dream", she advocated removing the requirement that the NHS be free at the point of use, replacing it with "an NHS insurance premium", and that "allowances could be made for those with private insurance and private expertise could be used". She also said that "The NHS ought not to exclude as a matter of principle the private sector" stating that "Competition is both a spur and a discipline". She said that "some might advocate putting a hospital or two under private management if only to prove that the Government can do it better." She later went on to say, "I am not advocating privatising the NHS. An undiluted private health insurance scheme is not the answer. With current schemes, so much seems to be excluded. And just when the need is greatest the premiums become unaffordable."

In 2006–07, Cumberlege chaired a commission reviewing the approach of the Catholic Church in England and Wales to child protection.

In 2010 she was awarded an Honorary Fellowship by the Royal College of Nursing.

She conducted a review of maternity services for NHS England in 2015. Better Births, the report of the review, recommended that all women should have the choice to give birth where they want, with the support of the same midwife throughout pregnancy, labour and the early weeks of motherhood, with control over a personal maternity care budget of £3,000 to be spent on the NHS care they choose.

In February 2018, she was appointed by the Health Secretary, Jeremy Hunt, to chair the Independent Medicines and Medical Devices Security Review, investigating reports from women patients about harmful side effects from medicines and medical devices, and how the health service had responded. The Review was reported in July 2020. It dealt with oral pregnancy test Primodos, anti-epilepsy drug sodium valproate and pelvic mesh repairs. The Review described "a culture of denial, institutional resistance to responding to safety concerns, and an absence of accountability".

== Business ventures ==
In 2001 she launched Cumberlege Connections Ltd.; this became Cumberlege Eden and Partners in 2013. These companies specialized in health sector training and consultancy.

== Affiliations ==
- Trustee, Cancer Research UK
- Senior Associate, The King's Fund.
- Co-chair, Associate Parliamentary Health Group and the All Party Parliamentary Osteoporosis Group
- Secretary, Dying Well Parliamentary Group
- Vice President, Royal Society for Public Health
- Honorary Fellow, Royal College of Physicians
- Vice President of the Royal Colleges of Nursing and Midwives
- Chair of Trustees, Chailey Heritage School
- President, Age UK East Sussex
- Patron, National Kidney Federation
- Patron, Pregnancy Sickness Support
- Patron, Education for Health
- Patron, The MASIC Foundation
- Patron, The Iolanthe Midwifery Trust

== Personal life ==
In 1961, she married Patrick Francis Howard Cumberlege, of Vuggles Farm, Newick, Lewes, Sussex, sometime chairman of the Newick Village Society and formerly of the Royal Navy, grandson of Sir Alexander Doran Gibbons, 7th Baronet. They have three sons.

A Roman Catholic, she spoke at the Catholic Medical Association (formerly the Guild of Catholic Doctors) conference in Bristol in April 2009, officiated by Archbishop Peter Smith.
