= Charles Cumberlege =

Indian-born English cricketer

Charles Farrington Cumberlege (29 July 1851 – 12 February 1929) was an Indian-born English cricketer active 1872 who played in two first-class cricket matches for Surrey County Cricket Club. He was born in Karachi, Bombay Presidency, British India in 1851 and died in Ealing in 1929. His son, Barry Cumberlege, played cricket for Cambridge University and Kent and rugby union for Blackheath and England.
