= House of Lords Reform Act 2014 =

Act of the Parliament of the United Kingdom

House of Lords Reform Act 2014 (Note: Section 7(1).)
- Act of Parliament
- Parliament of the United Kingdom
- Long title: An Act to make provision for resignation from the House of Lords; and to make provision for the expulsion of Members of the House of Lords in specified circumstances.
- Citation: 2014 c. 24
- Introduced by: Dan Byles MP (Commons); David Steel, Lord Steel of Aikwood (Lords)
- Territorial extent: United Kingdom (Note: Section 7(4).)

Dates
- Royal assent: 14 May 2014
- Commencement: 14 May 2014 (§§ 3−7) (Note: Section 7(3)); 14 August 2014 (§§ 1−2) (Note: Section 7(2))
Other legislation
Amended by	House of Lords (Expulsion and Suspension) Act 2015; European Parliamentary Elections Etc. (Repeal, Revocation, Amendment and Saving Provisions) (United Kingdom and Gibraltar) (EU Exit) Regulations 2018; Elections Act 2022; House of Lords (Hereditary Peers) Act 2026
Relates to	Peerage Act 1963; Constitutional Reform and Governance Act 2010

Status: Amended

Text of statute as originally enacted

Revised text of statute as amended

The House of Lords Reform Act 2014 (c. 24) is an act of the Parliament of the United Kingdom. The act was a private member's bill. It received royal assent on 14 May 2014. The act allows members of the House of Lords to retire or resign – actions previously constitutionally impossible for life peers. (Note: Under the provisions of the Peerage Act 1963, hereditary peers can effectively resign from the House of Lords by disclaiming their peerage, but this procedure has only been used once since the House of Lords Act 1999 removed automatic membership of hereditary peers in that House.) It also makes provision to exclude members who commit serious criminal offences resulting in a jail sentence of at least one year, (Note: Prior to the act Jeffrey Archer, Baron Archer of Weston-super-Mare: 19 July 2001 (4 years), Mike Watson, Baron Watson of Invergowrie: 22 September 2005 (1 year and 4 months), Conrad Black, Baron Black of Crossharbour: 10 December 2007 (6 years and 6 months), John Taylor, Baron Taylor of Warwick: 31 May 2011 (1 year) was imprisoned for more than a year. Nazir Ahmed, Baron Ahmed: 25 February 2009 (12 weeks), Paul White, Baron Hanningfield: 1 July 2011 (9 months) was imprisoned under a year.) and members who fail to attend the House for a whole session, provided that the session is longer than 6 months. The act does not have retrospective effect.

As of April 2026, 224 peers have resigned or retired, and a further 16 peers were removed under the act's provisions regarding non-attendance. The first peer to resign was Julian Grenfell, 3rd Baron Grenfell, on 1 October 2014.

Amongst other things, this act provides for the right of peers to resign from the House of Lords, whilst keeping their title and style. Section 4(5) states that those who have resigned or been removed from the House of Lords can stand or re-stand as MPs. To date, no such person has become an MP.

== Peers removed for non-attendance under the provisions of the act ==
Peer	Party	Type	Date joined in Lords	Session without any attendance	Date removed	Post removal	Died
Lord Bridges	Crossbench	Hereditary	12 February 1975	56th Parliament, 1st Session (2015–2016)	18 May 2016	1 year, 9 days	27 May 2017 (aged 89)
Lord Neill of Bladen	Crossbench	Life	28 November 1997	56th Parliament, 1st Session (2015–2016)	18 May 2016	10 days	28 May 2016 (aged 89)
Lord Thomas of Macclesfield	Labour	Life	28 November 1997	56th Parliament, 1st Session (2015–2016)	18 May 2016	2 years, 44 days	1 July 2018 (aged 80)
Baroness Thomas of Walliswood	Liberal Democrat	Life	6 October 1994	56th Parliament, 1st Session (2015–2016)	18 May 2016	7 years, 141 days	6 October 2023 (aged 87)
Baroness Turner of Camden	Labour	Life	28 May 1985	56th Parliament, 2nd Session (2016–2017)	13 June 2017	3 years, 101 days	26 February 2018 (aged 90)
Lord Wolfson of Sunningdale	Conservative	Life	26 March 1991	56th Parliament, 2nd Session (2016–2017)	13 June 2017	3 years, 270 days	10 March 2021 (aged 85)
Lord Selsdon	Conservative	Hereditary	30 July 1963	58th Parliament, 1st Session (2019–2021)	11 May 2021	3 years, 130 days	18 September 2024 (aged 86)
Lord Rogers of Riverside	Labour	Life	17 October 1996	58th Parliament, 1st Session (2019–2021)	11 May 2021	221 days	18 December 2021 (aged 88)
Lord Bhatia	Non-affiliated	Life	5 June 2001	58th Parliament, 3rd Session (2022–2023)	7 November 2023	66 days	12 January 2024 (aged 91)
Lord Dixon-Smith	Conservative	Life	11 October 1993	58th Parliament, 3rd Session (2022–2023)	7 November 2023	2 years, 358 days	
Lord Willoughby de Broke	Non-affiliated	Hereditary	9 July 1986	58th Parliament, 4th Session (2023–2024)	9 July 2024	2 years, 114 days	
Lord Prescott	Labour	Life	7 July 2010	58th Parliament, 4th Session (2023–2024)	9 July 2024	134 days	20 November 2024 (aged 86)
Lord Davies of Oldham	Labour	Life	3 October 1997	58th Parliament, 4th Session (2023–2024)	9 July 2024	2 years, 110 days	27 October 2026 (aged 87)
Baroness Corston	Labour	Life	29 June 2005	58th Parliament, 4th Session (2023–2024)	9 July 2024	2 years, 114 days	
Lord Black of Crossharbour	Non-affiliated	Life	30 October 2001	58th Parliament, 4th Session (2023–2024)	9 July 2024	2 years, 114 days	
Lord Kalms	Non-affiliated	Life	1 June 2004	58th Parliament, 4th Session (2023–2024)	9 July 2024	264 days	30 March 2025 (aged 93)
Baroness Billingham	Labour	Life	2 May 2000	59th Parliament, 1st Session (2024–2026)	13 May 2026	171 days	
Lord Christopher	Labour	Life	30 July 1998	59th Parliament, 1st Session (2024–2026)	13 May 2026	59 days	11 July 2026 (aged 101)

== See also ==
- Reform of the House of Lords (details reform proposals put forward since 1997)
- History of reform of the House of Lords (details reforms enacted since the 16th century)
- House of Lords Act 1999 (whose provisions were amended by the 2014 Act)
- Constitutional Reform and Governance Act 2010 (five Lords resigned through this Act)
- House of Lords (Expulsion and Suspension) Act 2015
- List of former members of the House of Lords (2000–present)
