= Constitutional Reform and Governance Act 2010 =

Act of the Parliament of the United Kingdom

Constitutional Reform and Governance Act 2010 (Note: Section Section 52(6).)
- Act of Parliament
- Parliament of the United Kingdom
- Long title: An Act to make provision relating to the civil service of the State; to make provision in relation to section 3 of the Act of Settlement; to make provision relating to the ratification of treaties; to make provision relating to the counting of votes in parliamentary elections; to amend the Parliamentary Standards Act 2009 and the European Parliament (Pay and Pensions) Act 1979 and to make provision relating to pensions for members of the House of Commons, Ministers and other office holders; to make provision for treating members of the House of Commons and members of the House of Lords as resident, ordinarily resident and domiciled in the United Kingdom for taxation purposes; to amend the Government Resources and Accounts Act 2000 and to make corresponding provision in relation to Wales; to amend the Public Records Act 1958 and the Freedom of Information Act 2000.
- Citation: 2010 c. 25
- Introduced by: Jack Straw (Commons); Lord Bach (Lords)
- Territorial extent: United Kingdom

Dates
- Royal assent: 8 April 2010
- Commencement: Various (Note: Section 52(2)–(5).)
Other legislation
Amends	Act of Settlement 1701; Public Records Act 1958; Parliamentary Commissioner Act 1967; Pensions (Increase) Act 1971; Superannuation Act 1972; Parliamentary and other Pensions Act 1972; House of Commons Disqualification Act 1975; Northern Ireland Assembly Disqualification Act 1975; House of Commons (Administration) Act 1978; European Parliament (Pay and Pensions) Act 1979; House of Commons Members' Fund and Parliamentary Pensions Act 1981; Representation of the People Act 1983; Parliamentary and other Pensions Act 1987; Ministerial and other Pensions and Salaries Act 1991; Civil Service (Management Functions) Act 1992; Government of Wales Act 1998; Scotland Act 1998; Social Security Contributions (Transfer of Functions, etc.) Act 1999; House of Lords Act 1999; Regulation of Investigatory Powers Act 2000; Government Resources and Accounts Act 2000; Freedom of Information Act 2000; Tax Credits Act 2002; Extradition Act 2003; Pensions Act 2004; Public Services Ombudsman (Wales) Act 2005; Revenue and Customs (Complaints and Misconduct) Regulations 2005; Government of Wales Act 2006; Police and Justice Act 2006; Charities and Trustee Investment (Scotland) Act 2005 (Consequential Provisions and Modifications) Order 2006; Parliament (Joint Departments) Act 2007; Crossrail Act 2008; Parliamentary Standards Act 2009
Repeals/revokes	Servants of the Crown (Parliamentary, European Assembly and Northern Ireland Assembly Candidature) Order 1987; Diplomatic Service Order in Council 1991; Diplomatic Service (Amendment) Order in Council 1994; Diplomatic Service (Amendment) (No. 2) Order in Council 1994; Civil Service Order in Council 1995; Civil Service (Amendment) Order in Council 1995; Diplomatic Service (Amendment) Order in Council 1995; Civil Service (Amendment) Order in Council 1996; Civil Service (Amendment) Order in Council 1997; Civil Service (Amendment) Order in Council 1998; Civil Service (Amendment) Order in Council 1999; Civil Service (Amendment) Order in Council 2000; Civil Service (Amendment) Order in Council 2001; Civil Service (Amendment) Order in Council 2002; Civil Service (Amendment) Order in Council 2004; Diplomatic Service (Amendment) Order in Council 2004; Civil Service (Amendment) Order in Council 2005; Civil Service (Amendment) Order in Council 2007; Civil Service (Amendment) (No. 2) Order in Council 2007; Civil Service (Amendment) (No. 3) Order in Council 2007; Civil Service (Amendment) Order in Council 2008; Civil Service (Amendment) (No. 2) Order in Council 2008; Diplomatic Service (Amendment) Order in Council 2009
Amended by	Finance Act 2011; Finance Act 2012; Protection of Freedoms Act 2012; Public Service Pensions Act 2013; European Union (Withdrawal) Act 2018 (Consequential Amendments) Regulations 2018; Ministerial and other Maternity Allowances Act 2021; Elections Act 2022; Finance Act 2025; House of Lords (Hereditary Peers) Act 2026

Status: Amended

Text of statute as originally enacted

Revised text of statute as amended

The Constitutional Reform and Governance Act 2010 (c. 25), or CRAG Act, is an act of the Parliament of the United Kingdom on UK constitutional law which affected the civil service and the ratification of treaties, and made other significant changes. It extends to all parts of the United Kingdom.

== Passage ==
In order to pass the legislation through the parliamentary "wash-up" procedure, provisions relating to phasing out the last hereditary peers from the House of Lords were removed.

== Commencements ==
The act was passed on 8 April 2010, in the last days of Gordon Brown's premiership, and before the change of government that resulted from the general election on 6 May. Part 4 (tax status of MPs and members of the House of Lords) came into force immediately on the passing of the act. Some of the act's provisions were brought into force in April or May 2010 by a commencement order made on 15 April 2010 by Bridget Prentice, Parliamentary Under-Secretary of State (Ministry of justice). Ministers of the incoming government made commencement orders for the act's transitional and other provisions. Francis Maude, Minister for the Cabinet Office made the commencement order for Parts 1 (the civil service), 2 (ratification of treaties) and 5 (transparency of government financial reporting to Parliament) to come into force on 11 November 2010.

== Provisions ==
=== Treaty ratification ===
With regard to parliamentary approval for the ratification of treaties, part II of the act gave the Ponsonby Rule a statutory footing, but did not place the declaration of war and the deployment of the British armed forces onto a similar statutory footing, as was first intended when the bill came to Parliament, leaving them instead to the royal prerogative, as before. Originally, Part II's rules also did not apply to certain treaties involving the European Union as provisions for these were made in the European Parliamentary Elections Act 2002 and the European Union (Amendment) Act 2008. Later the Euratom treaties were also excluded. These exceptions were removed as a consequence of Brexit.

=== Civil service ===
The act put the civil service on a statutory footing for the first time. Its provisions include the establishment of a Civil service commission and a power for the Minister for the Civil Service to manage the civil service, and it provides for a requirement that appointments to the civil service are to be made on merit on the basis of fair and open competition. It also requires the Minister for the Civil Service to publish a code of conduct which provides that a special adviser (defined in section 15) may not authorise the expenditure of public funds, or exercise any power in relation to the management of any part of the civil service, or exercise any power under the royal prerogative; but the act expressly states that the code need not require special advisers to carry out their duties with objectivity or impartiality.

The Institute for Government's publication Legislating for a Civil Service (2013) questioned the extent to which the act had changed anything in practice, and commented that the legislation did not set out much about the structure or practice of Whitehall, unlike the Westminster-style systems of Australia, Canada and New Zealand, where more of how their civil services work was codified. It mentioned that, while all four systems have a commission to regulate appointments to the civil service, in Australia, for example, the specific text of the code of conduct is set out in primary legislation.

=== FOI exemption for royal family ===
Provisions of the act that amended the Freedom of Information Act 2000 came into force on 19 January 2011. The commencement order was made by Kenneth Clarke (Ministry of Justice). It made information relating to communications with the sovereign, the heir or the second in line to the throne subject to an absolute exemption from disclosure, and made information relating to communications with other members of the royal family or the royal household subject to a qualified exemption.

=== Other provisions ===
A commencement order for transitional provisions was made in July 2010 by Mark Harper, (Parliamentary Secretary, Minister for Political and Constitutional Reform, in the Cabinet Office). Sections in Part 3 of the act, for amending the Parliamentary Standards Act 2009, were brought into force in April–May 2010. As a result of the provisions concerning the tax status of members of either the House of Commons or the House of Lords (§§ 41–42 in Part 4), five life peers withdrew from the House of Lords in order to retain non-dom status for UK tax purposes:

Key:

Conservative Crossbench

Name	Peer Type	Start	End	Ref.
The Lord Laidlaw	Life peer	14 June 2004	15 April 2010	
The Lord McAlpine of West Green	Life peer	2 February 1984	26 May 2010	
The Baroness Dunn	Life peer	24 August 1990	30 June 2010	
The Lord Bagri	Life peer	14 February 1997	6 July 2010	
The Lord Foster of Thames Bank	Life peer	19 July 1999	6 July 2010	

== See also ==
- Constitution of the United Kingdom
- Declarations of war by Great Britain and the United Kingdom
