= The Accident Man =

Book by Tom Cain

- Author: Tom Cain
- Language: English
- Series: Samuel Carver series
- Genre: Thriller
- Publisher: Bantam Press / Corgi
- Publication date: 2 July 2007
- Publication place: England
- Media type: Print
- Pages: 414
- ISBN: 978-0-593-05805-3
- OCLC: 85829307
- Dewey Decimal: 823.92
- Followed by: The Survivor (2008)

The Accident Man is the first novel of the Samuel Carver series by English thriller writer, Tom Cain, released on 2 July 2007 through Bantam Press.

== Plot ==
The novel proposes a fictional account for the events surrounding the death of Diana, Princess of Wales, based on some of the conspiracy theories in subsequent circulation. The central character, Samuel Carver, is an ex-marine, now assassin, who is tricked into committing the act. The story focuses on Carver's efforts to avoid his ex-employers' attempts on his life, whilst he tries to discover the origins of the "kill order", and bring those involved to justice.

== Movie ==
The novel was optioned by Paramount Pictures in 2007, however this was during the 2007–2008 Writers Guild of America strike and no further details have been released since.

== Reception ==
The novel was relatively well received, with critics mainly praising the novels fast-paced action and creative storyline. Some critics have, however, criticised the novels "not entirely believable" romance between Carver and his Russian would-be killer Alix.

Carol Memmott of USA Today praised the novel, calling it is a "thrill-a-minute debut" and commenting on Cain's "stunning imagining of the lives and minds of paid assassins and Russian gang members". In a review by The Calgary Herald for Canada.com, Dan Healing praises the novels "attention to detail", Cain's ability to both build and relax the tension at the right times; overall Healing calls the novel a "tour de force, especially for a first-time novelist". The Daily Telegraphs Susanna Yager stated, in a positive review, that "it's all splendidly implausible and ideal reading for the beach".

Oline H. Cogdill, for Pittsburgh Live, was more critical of the novel. She stated that "a predictable, and not entirely believable, romance mars "The Accident Man's" originality, as does the de rigueur villain who can't be killed but talks your ear off", however also states that "Cain keeps the scenery breathtaking and the action heart-stopping". These sentiments were mirrored by Publishers Weekly who opined that "hopefully, Cain will keep the mayhem and soft-pedal the love interest in his next Samuel Carver thriller". the New Statesman was particularly critical, with reviewer Hannah Davies finding the protagonist Carver to be "remarkably stupid", the premise to be "ludicrous"; stating, of the novel, "any originality is soon sacrificed to flashy set pieces".
