= Carver (novel) =

2011 novel by Tom Cain

- Author: Tom Cain
- Language: English
- Series: Samuel Carver series
- Genre: Thriller
- Publisher: Bantam Press
- Publication date: 18 August 2011
- Publication place: England
- Media type: Print
- Pages: 400
- ISBN: 978-0-593-06765-9
- OCLC: 748235636
- Preceded by: Dictator (2010)

Carver is the fifth novel of the Samuel Carver series by English thriller writer, Tom Cain, released on 18 August 2011 through Bantam Press.

== Plot ==
The central character, Samuel Carver, is an ex-assassin. The story focuses on an unknown group who are attempting to bring about the 2008 financial crisis, after having caused the collapse of the Lehman Brothers financial institution, and Carver is hired to stop them.

== Reception ==
The novel was well received by online review site Crimesquad, who stated that "The prose is tightrope taut and rarely is any word either extraneous or unnecessary." and awarded the novel a score of five out of five.
