= Assassin (Cain novel) =

2009 novel by Tom Cain

- Author: Tom Cain
- Language: English
- Series: Samuel Carver series
- Genre: Thriller
- Publisher: Bantam Press / Corgi
- Publication date: 2 July 2009
- Publication place: England
- Media type: Print
- Pages: 368
- ISBN: 978-0-593-06231-9
- OCLC: 472225160
- Preceded by: The Survivor (2008)
- Followed by: Dictator (2010)

Assassin is the third novel of the Samuel Carver series by the English thriller writer Tom Cain, released on 2 July 2009 through Bantam Press.

== Plot ==
This novel takes place twelve years after the previous Samuel Carver novel, The Survivor, with Carver having spent the intervening years as a security consultant. The plot of the novel centres on a copycat killer attempting to implicate Carver in the assassination of America's first black president.

== Reception ==
The book was well received, with critics praising its fast-paced action and complex plot.

Sarah Broadhurst of Love Reading stated that she thinks Cain "comes mighty close" to reaching the standard of thriller writing attained by Lee Child in his Jack Reacher series (a key influence on Cain); and states that the novel is "Terrific stuff. Highly recommended". This praise was echoed by Roddy Brooks, writing for the Coventry Telegraph, who found the finale to be "nerve-jangling", and the novel as a whole a "fast-moving thriller"; he stated that "Cain is a master of the genre.".

The Daily Telegraph's Jeremy Jehu was more critical. Referring to the twelve-year jump in the character's story, he stated that "[Cain's] solution in this third Carver romp is an act of either outrageous chutzpah or unmitigated cheek"; however he states that "Cain still rattles out a punchy yarn, but fans might well feel taken for a ride – albeit an exciting one.".
