= Dictator (Cain novel) =

2010 novel by Tom Cain

- Author: Tom Cain
- Language: English
- Series: Samuel Carver series
- Genre: Thriller
- Publisher: Bantam Press / Corgi
- Publication date: 5 August 2010
- Publication place: England
- Media type: Print
- Pages: 384
- ISBN: 978-0-593-06234-0
- OCLC: 620320986
- Preceded by: Assassin (2009)
- Followed by: Carver (2011)

Dictator is the fourth novel of the Samuel Carver series by English thriller writer, Tom Cain, released on 5 August 2010 through Bantam Press.

== Plot ==
Ten years prior to this story, Carver was supposed to have assassinated Henderson Gushungo, an African dictator. The novel follows Carver's subsequent attempts to oust the dictator, and force a regime change. Amongst the locations used as settings are Switzerland, Malemba, Suffolk, England and Hong Kong.

== Reception ==
The novel was well received, with critics praising its pace and "visceral" action sequences.

Reviewing for The Daily Telegraph, Jeremy Jehu states, of Cain himself, "he works at becoming a byword for intelligent, topical, articulate action romps that slightly send themselves up.", although he also notes that, given the 1997 setting of the first Samuel Carver novel, his age in this one would be somewhat unrealistic.

Rich Westwood, reviewing for Euro Crime, stated that "Dictator is an ideal holiday novel for a thriller fan, with a hard-as-nails protagonist, satisfyingly gritty action sequences, beautiful women and a collection of very nasty baddies".

The novel was also well reviewed by G.S. of CrimeSquad, who awarded it five out of five and commented that "Dictator is an outstanding novel which has both Cain and Carver displaying some masterful tradecraft.".
