= List of life peerages (1997–2010) =

Peerages and baronetcies of Britain and Ireland
Extant	All
Dukes	Dukedoms
Marquesses	Marquessates
Earls	Earldoms
Viscounts	Viscountcies
Barons	Baronies
En, Sc, GB, Ire, UK (law, life: 1958–1979, 1979–1997, 1997–2010, 2010–2024, 2024–present)
Baronets	Baronetcies

This is a list of life peerages in the Peerage of the United Kingdom created under the Life Peerages Act 1958 from 1997 to 2010, during the tenures of the Labour prime ministers Tony Blair and Gordon Brown.

== Tony Blair (1997–2007) ==
Living
Living but left the House of Lords

Number	Date of creation	Name	Title	Territorial qualification	Date of retirement (if applicable)	Date of extinction (if applicable)
1	14 May 1997	Doug Hoyle ‡	Baron Hoyle	of Warrington in the County of Cheshire	25 July 2023	6 April 2024
2	14 May 1997	Charlie Falconer	Baron Falconer of Thoroton	of Thoroton in the County of Nottinghamshire		
3	16 May 1997	David Simon	Baron Simon of Highbury	of Canonbury in the London Borough of Islington	9 June 2017	
4	16 May 1997	John Gilbert ‡	Baron Gilbert	of Dudley in the County of West Midlands		2 June 2013
5	21 May 1997	Andrew Hardie	Baron Hardie	of Blackford in the City of Edinburgh		
6	3 June 1997	John Biffen ‡	Baron Biffen	of Tanat in the County of Shropshire		14 August 2007
7	4 June 1997	Joan Lestor ‡	Baroness Lestor of Eccles	of Tooting Bec in the London Borough of Wandsworth		27 March 1998
8	5 June 1997	Michael Jopling ‡	Baron Jopling	of Ainderby Quernhow in the County of North Yorkshire	24 July 2026	
9	5 June 1997	Peter Shore ‡	Baron Shore of Stepney	of Stepney in the London Borough of Tower Hamlets		24 September 2001
10	6 June 1997	David Howell ‡	Baron Howell of Guildford	of Penton Mewsey in the County of Hampshire		
11	6 June 1997	David Steel ‡	Baron Steel of Aikwood	of Ettrick Forest in the Scottish Borders	27 March 2020	
12	9 June 1997	Don Dixon ‡	Baron Dixon	of Jarrow in the County of Tyne and Wear	9 February 2016	19 February 2017
13	9 June 1997	Tim Renton ‡	Baron Renton of Mount Harry	of Offham in the County of East Sussex	14 April 2016	25 August 2020
14	10 June 1997	John Evans ‡ #	Baron Evans of Parkside	of St Helens in the County of Merseyside	20 April 2015	5 March 2016
15	10 June 1997	James Molyneaux ‡	Baron Molyneaux of Killead	of Killead in the County of Antrim		9 March 2015
16	11 June 1997	Geoffrey Lofthouse ‡	Baron Lofthouse of Pontefract	of Pontefract in the County of West Yorkshire		1 November 2012
17	11 June 1997	Paul Channon ‡	Baron Kelvedon	of Ongar in the County of Essex		27 January 2007
18	12 June 1997	David Alton ‡	Baron Alton of Liverpool	of Mossley Hill in the County of Merseyside		
19	12 June 1997	Patrick Mayhew ‡	Baron Mayhew of Twysden	of Kilndown in the County of Kent	1 June 2015	25 June 2016
20	13 June 1997	Douglas Hurd ‡	Baron Hurd of Westwell	of Westwell in the County of Oxfordshire	9 June 2016	
21	16 June 1997	Kenneth Baker ‡	Baron Baker of Dorking	of Iford in the County of East Sussex		
22	17 June 1997	John Patten ‡	Baron Patten	of Wincanton in the County of Somerset		
23	18 July 1997	Colin Cowdrey	Baron Cowdrey of Tonbridge	of Tonbridge in the County of Kent		4 December 2000
24	21 July 1997	Peter Inge	Baron Inge	of Richmond in the County of North Yorkshire	25 April 2016	20 July 2022
25	21 July 1997	Russell Johnston ‡ #	Baron Russell-Johnston	of Minginish in Highlands		27 July 2008
26	22 July 1997	Peter Levene	Baron Levene of Portsoken	of Portsoken in the City of London	28 November 2024	
27	23 September 1997	Michael Levy	Baron Levy	of Mill Hill in the London Borough of Barnet		
28	23 September 1997	Jill Knight ‡	Baroness Knight of Collingtree	of Collingtree in the County of Northamptonshire	24 March 2016	6 April 2022
29	24 September 1997	Valerie Amos	Baroness Amos	of Brondesbury in the London Borough of Brent		
30	24 September 1997	Norman Hogg ‡	Baron Hogg of Cumbernauld	of Cumbernauld in North Lanarkshire		8 October 2008
31	25 September 1997	Richard Newby	Baron Newby	of Rothwell in the County of West Yorkshire		
32	25 September 1997	Stuart Randall ‡	Baron Randall of St Budeaux	of St Budeaux in the County of Devon		11 August 2012
33	26 September 1997	Robin Renwick	Baron Renwick of Clifton	of Chelsea in the Royal Borough of Kensington and Chelsea	31 March 2018	4 November 2024
34	26 September 1997	Harold Walker ‡	Baron Walker of Doncaster	of Audenshaw in the County of Greater Manchester		11 November 2003
35	27 September 1997	Peter Hardy ‡	Baron Hardy of Wath	of Wath upon Dearne in the County of South Yorkshire		16 December 2003
36	27 September 1997	Robert Hughes ‡	Baron Hughes of Woodside	of Woodside in the City of Aberdeen		7 January 2022
37	29 September 1997	Lord James Douglas-Hamilton ‡ (Note: Formerly the 11th Earl of Selkirk, disclaimed that title in 1994.)	Baron Selkirk of Douglas	of Cramond in the City of Edinburgh	27 July 2023	28 November 2023
38	29 September 1997	Ian Lang ‡	Baron Lang of Monkton	of Merrick and the Rhinns of Kells in Dumfries and Galloway	30 June 2022	
39	30 September 1997	Sarah Ludford	Baroness Ludford	of Clerkenwell in the London Borough of Islington		
40	30 September 1997	Janet Fookes ‡	Baroness Fookes	of Plymouth in the County of Devon		
41	1 October 1997	Garfield Davies	Baron Davies of Coity	of Penybont in the County of Mid Glamorgan		4 March 2019
42	1 October 1997	Wyn Roberts ‡	Baron Roberts of Conwy	of Talyfan in the County of Gwynedd		14 December 2013
43	2 October 1997	Michael Sandberg	Baron Sandberg	of Passfield in the County of Hampshire	8 May 2015	7 July 2017
44	2 October 1997	Norman Blackwell	Baron Blackwell	of Woodcote in the County of Surrey		
45	3 October 1997	David Sainsbury	Baron Sainsbury of Turville	of Turville in the County of Buckinghamshire	1 July 2021	
46	3 October 1997	Bryan Davies ‡	Baron Davies of Oldham	of Broxbourne in the County of Hertfordshire	9 July 2024	27 October 2026
47	4 October 1997	James Gordon	Baron Gordon of Strathblane	of Deil's Craig in Stirling		31 March 2020
48	4 October 1997	John Cope ‡	Baron Cope of Berkeley	of Berkeley in the County of Gloucestershire	13 May 2020	
49	6 October 1997	Jill Pitkeathley	Baroness Pitkeathley	of Caversham in the Royal County of Berkshire		
50	6 October 1997	Alf Morris ‡	Baron Morris of Manchester	of Manchester in the County of Greater Manchester		12 August 2012
51	18 October 1997	Anthony Jacobs	Baron Jacobs	of Belgravia in the City of Westminster		21 June 2014
52	20 October 1997	Philip Hunt	Baron Hunt of Kings Heath	of Birmingham in the County of West Midlands		
53	20 October 1997	David Hunt ‡	Baron Hunt of Wirral	of Wirral in the County of Merseyside		
54	21 October 1997	Stan Orme ‡	Baron Orme	of Salford in the County of Greater Manchester		28 April 2005
55	21 October 1997	Tom Burlison	Baron Burlison	of Rowlands Gill in the County of Tyne and Wear		20 May 2008
56	22 October 1997	Tim Razzall	Baron Razzall	of Mortlake in the London Borough of Richmond		
57	22 October 1997	Tristan Garel-Jones ‡	Baron Garel-Jones	of Watford in the County of Hertfordshire		24 March 2020
58	23 October 1997	William Goodhart	Baron Goodhart	of Youlbury in the County of Oxfordshire	15 May 2015	10 January 2017
59	23 October 1997	Clive Brooke	Baron Brooke of Alverthorpe	of Alverthorpe in the County of West Yorkshire		
60	24 October 1997	Ruth Rendell	Baroness Rendell of Babergh	of Aldeburgh in the County of Suffolk		2 May 2015
61	24 October 1997	Navnit Dholakia	Baron Dholakia	of Waltham Brooks in the County of West Sussex		
62	25 October 1997	Greville Janner ‡	Baron Janner of Braunstone	of Leicester in the County of Leicestershire		19 December 2015
63	25 October 1997	Roy Hughes ‡	Baron Islwyn	of Casnewydd in the County of Gwent		19 December 2003
64	27 October 1997	David Puttnam	Baron Puttnam	of Queensgate in the Royal Borough of Kensington and Chelsea	27 October 2021	
65	27 October 1997	Helena Kennedy	Baroness Kennedy of The Shaws	of Cathcart in the City of Glasgow		
66	28 October 1997	Michael Morris ‡	Baron Naseby	of Sandy in the County of Bedfordshire		
67	28 October 1997	Terence Higgins ‡	Baron Higgins	of Worthing in the County of West Sussex	1 January 2019	25 November 2025
68	29 October 1997	Andrew Stone	Baron Stone of Blackheath	of Blackheath in the London Borough of Greenwich	5 December 2025	
69	29 October 1997	Roger Freeman ‡	Baron Freeman	of Dingley in the County of Northamptonshire	1 October 2020	2 June 2025
70	30 October 1997	Diana Maddock ‡	Baroness Maddock	of Christchurch in the County of Dorset		26 June 2020
71	30 October 1997	Patricia Scotland	Baroness Scotland of Asthal	of Asthal in the County of Oxfordshire		
72	31 October 1997	Cranley Onslow ‡ (Note: In remainder to the Barony of Onslow (Great Britain).)	Baron Onslow of Woking	of Woking in the County of Surrey		13 March 2001
73	31 October 1997	Tony Newton ‡	Baron Newton of Braintree	of Coggeshall in the County of Essex		25 March 2012
74	1 November 1997	Michael Montague	Baron Montague of Oxford	of Oxford in the County of Oxfordshire		5 November 1999
75	1 November 1997	Veronica Linklater	Baroness Linklater of Butterstone	of Riemore in Perth and Kinross	12 February 2016	15 December 2022
76	3 November 1997	Steve Bassam	Baron Bassam of Brighton	of Brighton in the County of East Sussex		
77	3 November 1997	Emma Nicholson ‡ #	Baroness Nicholson of Winterbourne	of Winterbourne in the Royal County of Berkshire		
78	4 November 1997	Barbara Young	Baroness Young of Old Scone	of Old Scone in Perth and Kinross		
79	4 November 1997	Trevor Smith	Baron Smith of Clifton	of Mountsandel in the County of Londonderry	31 January 2019	24 April 2021
80	5 November 1997	Terence Thomas	Baron Thomas of Macclesfield	of Prestbury in the County of Cheshire	18 May 2016	1 July 2018
81	5 November 1997	George Simpson	Baron Simpson of Dunkeld	of Dunkeld in Perth and Kinross	30 July 2015	
82	6 November 1997	Hector Monro ‡	Baron Monro of Langholm	of Westerkirk in Dumfries and Galloway		30 August 2006
83	6 November 1997	Mike Watson ‡	Baron Watson of Invergowrie	of Invergowrie in Perth and Kinross		
84	22 November 1997	Richard Ryder ‡	Baron Ryder of Wensum	of Wensum in the County of Norfolk	12 April 2021	
85	24 November 1997	Roy Hattersley ‡	Baron Hattersley	of Sparkbrook in the County of West Midlands	19 May 2017	13 June 2026
86	28 November 1997	Patrick Neill	Baron Neill of Bladen	of Briantspuddle in the County of Dorset	18 May 2016	28 May 2016
87	12 February 1998	Robin Butler	Baron Butler of Brockwell	of Herne Hill in the London Borough of Lambeth		
88	13 February 1998	Ronald Dearing	Baron Dearing	of Kingston upon Hull in the County of the East Riding of Yorkshire		19 February 2009
89	14 February 1998	David Sheppard	Baron Sheppard of Liverpool	of West Kirby in the County of Merseyside		5 March 2005
90	23 February 1998	Paul Hamlyn	Baron Hamlyn	of Edgeworth in the County of Gloucestershire		31 August 2001
91	17 July 1998	Brian Mackenzie	Baron Mackenzie of Framwellgate	of Durham in the County of Durham		
92	17 July 1998	Timothy Clement-Jones	Baron Clement-Jones	of Clapham in the London Borough of Lambeth		
93	18 July 1998	Waheed Alli	Baron Alli	of Norbury in the London Borough of Croydon		
94	18 July 1998	Pola Uddin	Baroness Uddin	of Bethnal Green in the London Borough of Tower Hamlets		
95	20 July 1998	Colin Marshall	Baron Marshall of Knightsbridge	of Knightsbridge in the City of Westminster		5 July 2012
96	20 July 1998	Terence Burns	Baron Burns	of Pitshanger in the London Borough of Ealing		
97	21 July 1998	Mary Goudie	Baroness Goudie	of Roundwood in the London Borough of Brent		
98	21 July 1998	John Tomlinson ‡ #	Baron Tomlinson	of Walsall in the County of West Midlands		20 January 2024
99	23 July 1998	Peta Buscombe	Baroness Buscombe	of Goring in the County of Oxfordshire		
100	23 July 1998	Glenys Thornton	Baroness Thornton	of Manningham in the County of West Yorkshire		
101	24 July 1998	Norman Lamont ‡	Baron Lamont of Lerwick	of Lerwick in the Shetland Islands		
102	24 July 1998	Christine Crawley #	Baroness Crawley	of Edgbaston in the County of West Midlands		
103	25 July 1998	Andrew Phillips	Baron Phillips of Sudbury	of Sudbury in the County of Suffolk	7 May 2015	9 April 2023
104	25 July 1998	Christopher Haskins	Baron Haskins	of Skidby in the County of the East Riding of Yorkshire	1 December 2020	30 March 2026
105	27 July 1998	Herbert Laming	Baron Laming	of Tewin in the County of Hertfordshire		15 July 2026
106	27 July 1998	Willy Bach	Baron Bach	of Lutterworth in the County of Leicestershire		
107	28 July 1998	Susan Miller	Baroness Miller of Chilthorne Domer	of Chilthorne Domer in the County of Somerset		
108	28 July 1998	David Evans	Baron Evans of Watford	of Chipperfield in the County of Hertfordshire		
109	29 July 1998	Norman Warner	Baron Warner	of Brockley in the London Borough of Lewisham	1 August 2024	
110	29 July 1998	Tony Clarke	Baron Clarke of Hampstead	of Hampstead in the London Borough of Camden	17 April 2026	
111	30 July 1998	Tony Christopher	Baron Christopher	of Leckhampton in the County of Gloucestershire	13 May 2026	11 July 2026
112	30 July 1998	Keith Brookman	Baron Brookman	of Ebbw Vale in the County of Gwent	2 April 2020	22 January 2025
113	31 July 1998	Paul White	Baron Hanningfield	of Chelmsford in the County of Essex		20 October 2024
114	31 July 1998	Timothy Bell	Baron Bell	of Belgravia in the City of Westminster		25 August 2019
115	1 August 1998	Philip Norton	Baron Norton of Louth	of Louth in the County of Lincolnshire		
116	1 August 1998	Margaret Sharp	Baroness Sharp of Guildford	of Guildford in the County of Surrey	31 July 2016	
117	3 August 1998	Kathleen Richardson	Baroness Richardson of Calow	of Calow in the County of Derbyshire	20 December 2018	
118	3 August 1998	Nazir Ahmed	Baron Ahmed	of Rotherham in the County of South Yorkshire	14 November 2020	
119	4 August 1998	Melvyn Bragg	Baron Bragg	of Wigton in the County of Cumbria	31 March 2026	
120	4 August 1998	Tom Sawyer	Baron Sawyer	of Darlington in the County of Durham		3 August 2025
121	5 August 1998	Toby Harris	Baron Harris of Haringey	of Hornsey in the London Borough of Haringey		
122	2 October 1998	Gus Macdonald	Baron Macdonald of Tradeston	of Tradeston in the City of Glasgow	27 April 2017	
123	5 February 1999	David Williamson	Baron Williamson of Horton	of Horton in the County of Somerset		30 August 2015
124	10 February 1999	Peter Imbert	Baron Imbert	of New Romney in the County of Kent		13 November 2017
125	25 February 1999	Onora O'Neill	Baroness O'Neill of Bengarve	of The Braid in the County of Antrim		
126	1 March 1999	Narendra Patel	Baron Patel	of Dunkeld in Perth and Kinross		
127	2 March 1999	Alexander Trotman	Baron Trotman	of Osmotherley in the County of North Yorkshire		25 April 2005
128	10 July 1999	Diana Warwick	Baroness Warwick of Undercliffe	of Undercliffe in the County of West Yorkshire		
129	12 July 1999	Robert Fellowes	Baron Fellowes	of Shotesham in the County of Norfolk	10 February 2022	29 July 2024
130	13 July 1999	Dennis Stevenson	Baron Stevenson of Coddenham	of Coddenham in the County of Suffolk	1 October 2023	
131	13 July 1999	Vivien Stern	Baroness Stern	of Vauxhall in the London Borough of Lambeth	2 December 2025	
132	14 July 1999	Michael Forsyth ‡	Baron Forsyth of Drumlean	of Drumlean in Stirling		
133	14 July 1999	Richard Faulkner	Baron Faulkner of Worcester	of Wimbledon in the London Borough of Merton		
134	15 July 1999	Usha Prashar	Baroness Prashar	of Runnymede in the County of Surrey		
135	15 July 1999	Joan Hanham	Baroness Hanham	of Kensington in the Royal Borough of Kensington and Chelsea	22 July 2020	24 January 2025
136	16 July 1999	John Laird	Baron Laird	of Artigarvan in the County of Tyrone		10 July 2018
137	16 July 1999	Dennis Rogan	Baron Rogan	of Lower Iveagh in the County of Down		
138	19 July 1999	Norman Foster	Baron Foster of Thames Bank	of Reddish in the County of Greater Manchester	6 July 2010	
139	19 July 1999	Murray Elder	Baron Elder	of Kirkcaldy in Fife		24 October 2023
140	20 July 1999	David Lea	Baron Lea of Crondall	of Crondall in the County of Hampshire	7 April 2022	
141	20 July 1999	Bill Brett	Baron Brett	of Lydd in the County of Kent		29 March 2012
142	21 July 1999	Chris Rennard	Baron Rennard	of Wavertree in the County of Merseyside		
143	21 July 1999	Rosalind Howells	Baroness Howells of St Davids	of Charlton in the London Borough of Greenwich	10 January 2019	14 October 2025
144	22 July 1999	William Bradshaw	Baron Bradshaw	of Wallingford in the County of Oxfordshire		
145	22 July 1999	Tarsem King	Baron King of West Bromwich	of West Bromwich in the County of West Midlands		9 January 2013
146	23 July 1999	Alan Watson	Baron Watson of Richmond	of Richmond in the London Borough of Richmond upon Thames	25 July 2023	
147	23 July 1999	Graham Kirkham	Baron Kirkham	of Old Cantley in the County of South Yorkshire		
148	26 July 1999	Anthony Grabiner	Baron Grabiner	of Aldwych in the City of Westminster		
149	26 July 1999	Doreen Massey	Baroness Massey of Darwen	of Darwen in the County of Lancashire		20 April 2024
150	27 July 1999	Alex Carlile	Baron Carlile of Berriew	of Berriew in the County of Powys		
151	27 July 1999	Ronald Oxburgh	Baron Oxburgh	of Liverpool in the County of Merseyside	28 April 2022	
152	28 July 1999	Lyndon Harrison #	Baron Harrison	of Chester in the County of Cheshire	11 July 2022	18 October 2024
153	28 July 1999	William Waldegrave ‡	Baron Waldegrave of North Hill	of Chewton Mendip in the County of Somerset		
154	29 July 1999	Peter Goldsmith	Baron Goldsmith	of Allerton in the County of Merseyside		
155	29 July 1999	Geoffrey Filkin	Baron Filkin	of Pimlico in the City of Westminster		
156	30 July 1999	David Lipsey	Baron Lipsey	of Tooting Bec in the London Borough of Wandsworth		1 July 2025
157	30 July 1999	Rosalie Wilkins	Baroness Wilkins	of Chesham Bois in the County of Buckinghamshire	23 July 2015	2 December 2024
158	31 July 1999	May Blood	Baroness Blood	of Blackwatertown in the County of Armagh	4 September 2018	21 October 2022
159	31 July 1999	Elizabeth Barker	Baroness Barker	of Anagach in Highland		
160	2 August 1999	Colin Sharman	Baron Sharman	of Redlynch in the County of Wiltshire	30 April 2015	
161	2 August 1999	Catherine Ashton	Baroness Ashton of Upholland	of St Albans in the County of Hertfordshire		
162	3 August 1999	Genista McIntosh	Baroness McIntosh of Hudnall	of Hampstead in the London Borough of Camden		
163	3 August 1999	Kenneth Woolmer ‡	Baron Woolmer of Leeds	of Leeds in the County of West Yorkshire	26 May 2020	
164	4 August 1999	Anita Gale	Baroness Gale	of Blaenrhondda in the County of Mid Glamorgan		
165	4 August 1999	Hector MacKenzie	Baron MacKenzie of Culkein	of Assynt in Highland	8 July 2024	
166	5 August 1999	Peter Smith	Baron Smith of Leigh	of Wigan in the County of Greater Manchester		2 August 2021
167	5 August 1999	Janet Whitaker	Baroness Whitaker	of Beeston in the County of Nottinghamshire		
168	6 August 1999	Robert Gavron	Baron Gavron	of Highgate in the London Borough of Camden		7 February 2015
169	6 August 1999	Angela Harris	Baroness Harris of Richmond	of Richmond in the County of North Yorkshire		
170	24 August 1999	George Robertson ‡	Baron Robertson of Port Ellen	of Islay in Argyll and Bute		
171	16 November 1999 (9 a.m.)	Toby Low, 1st Baron Aldington ‡	Baron Low	of Bispham in the County of Lancashire		7 December 2000
172	16 November 1999 (noon)	Frederick Erroll, 1st Baron Erroll of Hale ‡	Baron Erroll of Kilmun	of Kilmun in Argyll and Bute		14 September 2000
173	16 November 1999 (3 p.m.)	Antony Armstrong-Jones, 1st Earl of Snowdon	Baron Armstrong-Jones	of Nymans in the County of West Sussex	31 March 2016	13 January 2017
174	16 November 1999 (6 p.m.)	Frank Pakenham, 7th Earl of Longford	Baron Pakenham of Cowley	of Cowley in the County of Oxfordshire		3 August 2001
175	16 November 1999 (9 p.m.)	Malcolm Shepherd, 2nd Baron Shepherd	Baron Shepherd of Spalding	of Spalding in the County of Lincolnshire		5 April 2001
176	16 November 1999 (11 p.m.)	David Hennessy, 3rd Baron Windlesham	Baron Hennessy	of Windlesham in the County of Surrey		21 December 2010
177	17 November 1999 (6 a.m.)	George Jellicoe, 2nd Earl Jellicoe	Baron Jellicoe of Southampton	of Southampton in the County of Hampshire		22 February 2007
178	17 November 1999 (9 a.m.)	John Ganzoni, 2nd Baron Belstead	Baron Ganzoni	of Ipswich in the County of Suffolk		3 December 2005
179	17 November 1999 (noon)	Robert Gascoyne-Cecil, 13th Baron Cecil ‡ (Note: Succeeded as 7th Marquess of Salisbury in 2003.) (Viscount Cranborne)	Baron Gascoyne-Cecil	of Essendon in the County of Rutland	8 June 2017	
180	17 November 1999 (3 p.m.)	Peter Carington, 6th Baron Carrington	Baron Carington of Upton	of Upton in the County of Nottinghamshire		9 July 2018
181	9 February 2000	Leon Brittan ‡	Baron Brittan of Spennithorne	of Spennithorne in the County of North Yorkshire		21 January 2015
182	10 February 2000	Sally Greengross	Baroness Greengross	of Notting Hill in the Royal Borough of Kensington and Chelsea		23 June 2022
183	11 February 2000	John Birt	Baron Birt	of Liverpool in the County of Merseyside		
184	14 February 2000	Adam Patel	Baron Patel of Blackburn	of Langho in the County of Lancashire		29 May 2019
185	15 February 2000	Charles Powell	Baron Powell of Bayswater	of Canterbury in the County of Kent		
186	16 February 2000	Joel Joffe	Baron Joffe	of Liddington in the County of Wiltshire	30 March 2015	18 June 2017
187	17 April 2000	Richard Lyon-Dalberg-Acton, 4th Baron Acton	Baron Acton of Bridgnorth	of Aldenham in the County of Shropshire		10 October 2010
188	17 April 2000	Julian Grenfell, 3rd Baron Grenfell	Baron Grenfell of Kilvey	of Kilvey in the County of Swansea	1 October 2014	
189	18 April 2000	Rupert Mitford, 6th Baron Redesdale	Baron Mitford	of Redesdale in the County of Northumberland		
190	18 April 2000	Anthony Gueterbock, 18th Baron Berkeley	Baron Gueterbock	of Cranford in the London Borough of Hillingdon		
191	19 April 2000 (6 a.m.)	Thomas Lyttelton, 3rd Viscount Chandos	Baron Lyttelton of Aldershot	of Aldershot in the County of Hampshire		
192	19 April 2000 (9 a.m.)	James Erskine, 14th Earl of Mar and 16th Earl of Kellie	Baron Erskine of Alloa Tower	of Alloa in Clackmannanshire	30 June 2017	
193	19 April 2000 (noon)	Frederick Ponsonby, 4th Baron Ponsonby of Shulbrede	Baron Ponsonby of Roehampton	of Shulbrede in the County of West Sussex		
194	1 May 2000	Lindsay Northover	Baroness Northover	of Cissbury in the County of West Sussex		
195	1 May 2000	Matthew Oakeshott	Baron Oakeshott of Seagrove Bay	of Seagrove Bay in the County of Isle of Wight	16 July 2026	
196	2 May 2000	Angela Billingham #	Baroness Billingham	of Banbury in the County of Oxfordshire	13 May 2026	
197	2 May 2000	Daniel Brennan	Baron Brennan	of Bibury in the County of Gloucestershire		
198	3 May 2000	Janet Cohen	Baroness Cohen of Pimlico	of Pimlico in the City of Westminster	19 December 2024	
199	3 May 2000	Richard Layard	Baron Layard	of Highgate in the London Borough of Haringey		
200	4 May 2000	Tony Greaves	Baron Greaves	of Pendle in the County of Lancashire		23 March 2021
201	4 May 2000	Leslie Turnberg	Baron Turnberg	of Cheadle in the County of Cheshire	1 March 2026	
202	5 May 2000	Julian Hunt	Baron Hunt of Chesterton	of Chesterton in the County of Cambridgeshire	30 October 2021	20 April 2026
203	9 May 2000	Anne Gibson	Baroness Gibson of Market Rasen	of Market Rasen in the County of Lincolnshire		20 April 2018
204	9 May 2000	Kay Andrews	Baroness Andrews	of Southover in the County of East Sussex		
205	10 May 2000	Parry Mitchell	Baron Mitchell	of Hampstead in the London Borough of Camden		
206	10 May 2000	Bhikhu Parekh	Baron Parekh	of Kingston upon Hull in the East Riding of Yorkshire		
207	11 May 2000	Rosalind Scott	Baroness Scott of Needham Market	of Needham Market in the County of Suffolk		
208	11 May 2000	Matthew Evans	Baron Evans of Temple Guiting	of Temple Guiting in the County of Gloucestershire		6 July 2016
209	12 May 2000	David Shutt	Baron Shutt of Greetland	of Greetland and Stainland in the County of West Yorkshire		30 October 2020
210	12 May 2000	John Roper ‡	Baron Roper	of Thorney Island in the City of Westminster	23 May 2015	29 January 2016
211	15 May 2000	Joan Walmsley	Baroness Walmsley	of West Derby in the County of Merseyside		
212	15 May 2000	Alexander Bernstein	Baron Bernstein of Craigweil	of Craigweil in the County of West Sussex		13 April 2010
213	16 May 2000	Lennox Fyfe	Baron Fyfe of Fairfield	of Sauchie in Clackmannanshire		1 February 2011
214	16 May 2000	Sebastian Coe ‡	Baron Coe	of Ranmore in the County of Surrey	31 January 2022	
215	5 June 2000	Bill Jordan	Baron Jordan	of Bournville in the County of West Midlands		
216	7 June 2000	Sheila Noakes	Baroness Noakes	of Goudhurst in the County of Kent		
217	7 June 2000	Robin Hodgson ‡	Baron Hodgson of Astley Abbotts	of Nash in the County of Shropshire	12 December 2025	
218	12 June 2000	Kenneth O. Morgan	Baron Morgan	of Aberdyfi in the County of Gwynedd		
219	2 October 2000	Richard Luce ‡	Baron Luce	of Adur in the County of West Sussex	29 June 2020	
220	20 October 2000	Michael Ashcroft	Baron Ashcroft	of Chichester in the County of West Sussex	3 April 2015	
221	15 January 2001	Betty Boothroyd ‡ #	Baroness Boothroyd	of Sandwell in the County of West Midlands		26 February 2023
222	2 June 2001	Michael Chan †	Baron Chan	of Oxton in the County of Merseyside		21 January 2006
223	4 June 2001	Richard Best †	Baron Best	of Godmanstone in the County of Dorset		
224	5 June 2001	Amir Bhatia †	Baron Bhatia	of Hampton in the London Borough of Richmond-upon-Thames	7 November 2023	12 January 2024
225	16 June 2001	Jeff Rooker ‡	Baron Rooker	of Perry Barr in the County of West Midlands		
226	18 June 2001	Susan Greenfield †	Baroness Greenfield	of Ot Moor in the County of Oxfordshire		
227	19 June 2001	David Hannay †	Baron Hannay of Chiswick	of Bedford Park in the London Borough of Ealing		
228	20 June 2001	Sally Morgan	Baroness Morgan of Huyton	of Huyton in the County of Merseyside		
229	22 June 2001	Robert Sheldon ‡	Baron Sheldon	of Ashton-under-Lyne in the County of Greater Manchester	18 May 2015	2 February 2020
230	22 June 2001	Peter Temple-Morris ‡	Baron Temple-Morris	of Llandaff in the County of South Glamorgan and of Leominster in the County of Herefordshire		1 May 2018
231	23 June 2001	Claus Moser †	Baron Moser	of Regents Park in the London Borough of Camden		4 September 2015
232	25 June 2001	Valerie Howarth †	Baroness Howarth of Breckland	of Parson Cross in the County of South Yorkshire		23 March 2025
233	26 June 2001	Herman Ouseley †	Baron Ouseley	of Peckham Rye in the London Borough of Southwark	24 May 2019	2 October 2024
234	27 June 2001	Charles Guthrie	Baron Guthrie of Craigiebank	of Craigiebank in the City of Dundee	1 December 2020	18 September 2025
235	27 June 2001	Paul Condon †	Baron Condon	of Langton Green in the County of Kent	21 December 2017	
236	28 June 2001	Ilora Finlay †	Baroness Finlay of Llandaff	of Llandaff in the County of South Glamorgan		
237	28 June 2001	John Browne †	Baron Browne of Madingley	of Cambridge in the County of Cambridgeshire		
238	29 June 2001	Elspeth Howe, Lady Howe of Aberavon †	Baroness Howe of Idlicote	of Shipston-on-Stour in the County of Warwickshire	2 June 2020	22 March 2022
239	29 June 2001	Stewart Sutherland †	Baron Sutherland of Houndwood	of Houndwood in the Scottish Borders		29 January 2018
240	30 June 2001	Victor Adebowale †	Baron Adebowale	of Thornes in the County of West Yorkshire		
241	2 July 2001	Bruce Grocott ‡	Baron Grocott	of Telford in the County of Shropshire		
242	2 July 2001	David Clark ‡	Baron Clark of Windermere	of Windermere in the County of Cumbria		
243	3 July 2001	John Morris ‡	Baron Morris of Aberavon	of Aberavon in the County of West Glamorgan and of Ceredigion in the County of Dyfed		5 June 2023
244	3 July 2001	Norman Fowler ‡	Baron Fowler	of Sutton Coldfield in the County of West Midlands		
245	4 July 2001	Tom Pendry ‡	Baron Pendry	of Stalybridge in the County of Greater Manchester		26 February 2023
246	4 July 2001	Dale Campbell-Savours ‡	Baron Campbell-Savours	of Allerdale in the County of Cumbria		
247	5 July 2001	John MacGregor ‡	Baron MacGregor of Pulham Market	of Pulham Market in the County of Norfolk	26 July 2019	
248	5 July 2001	Robin Corbett ‡	Baron Corbett of Castle Vale	of Erdington in the County of West Midlands		19 February 2012
249	6 July 2001	Barry Jones ‡	Baron Jones	of Deeside in the County of Clwyd		
250	9 July 2001	Tom King ‡	Baron King of Bridgwater	of Bridgwater in the County of Somerset		
251	10 July 2001	Paddy Ashdown ‡	Baron Ashdown of Norton-sub-Hamdon	of Norton-sub-Hamdon in the County of Somerset		22 December 2018
252	11 July 2001	Ronnie Fearn ‡	Baron Fearn	of Southport in the County of Merseyside	11 July 2018	24 January 2022
253	12 July 2001	Michael Heseltine ‡	Baron Heseltine	of Thenford in the County of Northamptonshire		
254	13 July 2001	Llin Golding ‡	Baroness Golding	of Newcastle-under-Lyme in the County of Staffordshire		
255	14 July 2001	Ray Michie ‡	Baroness Michie of Gallanach	of Oban in Argyll and Bute		6 May 2008
256	16 July 2001	Giles Radice ‡	Baron Radice	of Chester-le-Street in the County of Durham	1 August 2022	25 August 2022
257	17 July 2001	John Taylor ‡ #	Baron Kilclooney	of Armagh in the County of Armagh		
258	18 July 2001	Robert May †	Baron May of Oxford	of Oxford in the County of Oxfordshire	2 May 2017	28 April 2020
259	19 July 2001	Robert Maclennan ‡	Baron Maclennan of Rogart	of Rogart in Sutherland		18 January 2020
260	20 July 2001	Ken Maginnis ‡	Baron Maginnis of Drumglass	of Carnteel in the County of Tyrone		
261	30 July 2001	Peter Brooke ‡	Baron Brooke of Sutton Mandeville	of Sutton Mandeville in the County of Wiltshire	18 September 2015	13 May 2023
262	28 August 2001	Richard Livsey ‡	Baron Livsey of Talgarth	of Talgarth in the County of Powys		16 September 2010
263	30 October 2001	Conrad Black	Baron Black of Crossharbour	of Crossharbour in the London Borough of Tower Hamlets	9 July 2024	
264	1 November 2002	George Carey	Baron Carey of Clifton	of Clifton in the City and County of Bristol		
265	18 November 2002	Richard Wilson	Baron Wilson of Dinton	of Dinton in the County of Buckinghamshire	6 September 2026	
266	16 June 2003	Michael Boyce	Baron Boyce	of Pimlico in the City of Westminster		6 November 2022
267	17 June 2003	William Cullen, Lord Cullen	Baron Cullen of Whitekirk	of Whitekirk in East Lothian	1 February 2019	
268	9 January 2004	David Triesman	Baron Triesman	of Tottenham in the London Borough of Haringey		30 January 2026
269	1 June 2004	Stanley Kalms	Baron Kalms	of Edgware in the London Borough of Barnet	9 July 2024	30 March 2025
270	1 June 2004	Paul Drayson	Baron Drayson	of Kensington in the Royal Borough of Kensington and Chelsea		
271	2 June 2004	Kishwer Falkner	Baroness Falkner of Margravine	of Barons Court in the London Borough of Hammersmith and Fulham		
272	2 June 2004	Denis Tunnicliffe	Baron Tunnicliffe	of Bracknell in the Royal County of Berkshire		
273	3 June 2004	Kumar Bhattacharyya	Baron Bhattacharyya	of Moseley in the County of West Midlands		1 March 2019
274	3 June 2004	Timothy Garden	Baron Garden	of Hampstead in the London Borough of Camden		9 August 2007
275	4 June 2004	Greville Howard (Note: In remainder to the Earldoms of Suffolk and Berkshire (England).)	Baron Howard of Rising	of Castle Rising in the County of Norfolk		
276	4 June 2004	Garry Hart	Baron Hart of Chilton	of Chilton in the County of Suffolk		3 August 2017
277	7 June 2004	Alexander Leitch	Baron Leitch	of Oakley in Fife		4 October 2024
278	7 June 2004	Philip Gould	Baron Gould of Brookwood	of Brookwood in the County of Surrey		6 November 2011
279	8 June 2004	Ruth Henig	Baroness Henig	of Lancaster in the County of Lancashire		29 February 2024
280	8 June 2004	Patrick Carter	Baron Carter of Coles	of Westmill in the County of Hertfordshire		
281	9 June 2004	Peter Snape ‡	Baron Snape	of Wednesbury in the County of West Midlands		13 August 2026
282	9 June 2004	Patricia Morris	Baroness Morris of Bolton	of Bolton in the County of Greater Manchester		
283	10 June 2004	Peter Truscott #	Baron Truscott	of St James's in the City of Westminster		
284	10 June 2004	Margaret Wall	Baroness Wall of New Barnet	of New Barnet in the London Borough of Barnet		25 January 2017
285	11 June 2004	Margaret Prosser	Baroness Prosser	of Battersea in the London Borough of Wandsworth		
286	11 June 2004	Delyth Morgan	Baroness Morgan of Drefelin	of Drefelin in the County of Dyfed		
287	14 June 2004	Irvine Laidlaw	Baron Laidlaw	of Rothiemay in Banffshire	15 April 2010	
288	14 June 2004	Richard Rosser	Baron Rosser	of Ickenham in the London Borough of Hillingdon		10 April 2024
289	15 June 2004	Julia Neuberger	Baroness Neuberger	of Primrose Hill in the London Borough of Camden		
290	15 June 2004	Roger Roberts	Baron Roberts of Llandudno	of Llandudno in the County of Gwynedd		
291	16 June 2004	Anthony Giddens	Baron Giddens	of Southgate in the London Borough of Enfield		
292	16 June 2004	Diljit Rana †	Baron Rana	of Malone in the County of Antrim	2 July 2024	
293	17 June 2004	Elaine Murphy †	Baroness Murphy	of Aldgate in the City of London		
294	17 June 2004	John Maxton ‡	Baron Maxton	of Blackwaterfoot in Ayrshire and Arran	5 May 2025	20 November 2025
295	18 June 2004	Edward Haughey	Baron Ballyedmond	of Mourne in the County of Down		13 March 2014
296	18 June 2004	Bill McKenzie	Baron McKenzie of Luton	of Luton in the County of Bedfordshire		2 December 2021
297	21 June 2004	Hugh Dykes #	Baron Dykes	of Harrow Weald in the London Borough of Harrow	2 March 2026	
298	21 June 2004	Alec Broers †	Baron Broers	of Cambridge in the County of Cambridgeshire	17 December 2021	
299	22 June 2004	Lola Young †	Baroness Young of Hornsey	of Hornsey in the London Borough of Haringey		
300	22 June 2004	Iain Vallance	Baron Vallance of Tummel	of Tummel in Perth and Kinross	13 January 2020	
301	23 June 2004	Leonard Steinberg	Baron Steinberg	of Belfast in the County of Antrim		2 November 2009
302	23 June 2004	Jane Bonham Carter	Baroness Bonham-Carter of Yarnbury	of Yarnbury in the County of Wiltshire		
303	24 June 2004	Nicky Chapman †	Baroness Chapman	of Leeds in the County of West Yorkshire		3 September 2009
304	24 June 2004	Margaret McDonagh	Baroness McDonagh	of Mitcham and of Morden in the London Borough of Merton		24 June 2023
305	25 June 2004	Anthony Young	Baron Young of Norwood Green	of Norwood Green in the London Borough of Ealing		
306	25 June 2004	Janet Royall	Baroness Royall of Blaisdon	of Blaisdon in the County of Gloucestershire		
307	28 June 2004	Ted Rowlands ‡	Baron Rowlands	of Merthyr Tydfil and of Rhymney in the County of Mid-Glamorgan		
308	28 June 2004	Alan Haworth	Baron Haworth	of Fisherfield in Ross and Cromarty		28 August 2023
309	29 June 2004	Ewen Cameron †	Baron Cameron of Dillington	of Dillington in the County of Somerset		
310	29 June 2004	Edward George	Baron George	of St Tudy in the County of Cornwall		18 April 2009
311	30 June 2004	Leslie Griffiths	Baron Griffiths of Burry Port	of Pembrey and Burry Port in the County of Dyfed		
312	30 June 2004	John Kerr	Baron Kerr of Kinlochard	of Kinlochard in Perth and Kinross		
313	1 July 2004	Frances D'Souza †	Baroness D'Souza	of Wychwood in the County of Oxfordshire		
314	1 July 2004	David Alliance	Baron Alliance	of Manchester in the County of Greater Manchester	21 March 2025	18 July 2025
315	11 January 2005	Chris Patten ‡	Baron Patten of Barnes	of Barnes in the London Borough of Richmond		
316	28 January 2005	Neil Kinnock ‡	Baron Kinnock	of Bedwellty in the County of Gwent		
317	31 March 2005	David Hope	Baron Hope of Thornes	of Thornes in the County of West Yorkshire	30 April 2015	
318	6 April 2005	John Stevens	Baron Stevens of Kirkwhelpington	of Kirkwhelpington in the County of Northumberland		
319	16 May 2005	Andrew Adonis	Baron Adonis	of Camden Town in the London Borough of Camden		
320	17 May 2005	David Ramsbotham †	Baron Ramsbotham	of Kensington in the Royal Borough of Kensington and Chelsea		13 December 2022
321	31 May 2005	Rennie Fritchie †	Baroness Fritchie	of Gloucester in the County of Gloucestershire	1 July 2024	12 March 2026
322	10 June 2005	Archy Kirkwood ‡	Baron Kirkwood of Kirkhope	of Kirkhope in Scottish Borders	2 September 2020	
323	13 June 2005	Ann Taylor ‡	Baroness Taylor of Bolton	of Bolton in the County of Greater Manchester		
324	14 June 2005	Estelle Morris ‡	Baroness Morris of Yardley	of Yardley in the County of West Midlands		
325	14 June 2005	Martin O'Neill ‡	Baron O'Neill of Clackmannan	of Clackmannan in Clackmannanshire		26 August 2020
326	15 June 2005	Alan Howarth ‡	Baron Howarth of Newport	of Newport in the County of Gwent		10 September 2025
327	15 June 2005	Paul Tyler ‡	Baron Tyler	of Linkinhorne in the County of Cornwall	28 October 2021	
328	16 June 2005	George Foulkes ‡	Baron Foulkes of Cumnock	of Cumnock in East Ayrshire		
329	16 June 2005	Derek Foster ‡	Baron Foster of Bishop Auckland	of Bishop Auckland in the County of Durham		6 January 2019
330	17 June 2005	Archie Hamilton ‡	Baron Hamilton of Epsom	of West Anstey in the County of Devon		
331	17 June 2005	David Chidgey ‡	Baron Chidgey	of Hamble-le-Rice in the County of Hampshire		15 February 2022
332	20 June 2005	Nigel Jones ‡	Baron Jones of Cheltenham	of Cheltenham in the County of Gloucestershire		7 November 2022
333	20 June 2005	Dennis Turner ‡	Baron Bilston	of Bilston in the County of West Midlands		25 February 2014
334	21 June 2005	Gillian Shephard ‡	Baroness Shephard of Northwold	of Northwold in the County of Norfolk		
335	21 June 2005	Lynda Clark ‡	Baroness Clark of Calton	of Calton in the City of Edinburgh		
336	22 June 2005	Lewis Moonie ‡	Baron Moonie	of Bennochy in Fife	28 April 2022	
337	22 June 2005	Chris Smith ‡	Baron Smith of Finsbury	of Finsbury in the London Borough of Islington		
338	23 June 2005	Jenny Tonge ‡	Baroness Tonge	of Kew in the London Borough of Richmond upon Thames	19 February 2021	
339	23 June 2005	Tony Banks ‡	Baron Stratford	of Stratford in the London Borough of Newham		8 January 2006
340	24 June 2005	Virginia Bottomley ‡	Baroness Bottomley of Nettlestone	of St Helens in the County of Isle of Wight		
341	24 June 2005	Brian Mawhinney ‡	Baron Mawhinney	of Peterborough in the County of Cambridgeshire		9 November 2019
342	27 June 2005	Jack Cunningham ‡	Baron Cunningham of Felling	of Felling in the County of Tyne and Wear	20 April 2026	
343	27 June 2005	Nicholas Lyell ‡	Baron Lyell of Markyate	of Markyate in the County of Hertfordshire		30 August 2010
344	28 June 2005	Donald Anderson ‡	Baron Anderson of Swansea	of Swansea in the County of West Glamorgan		
345	28 June 2005	Irene Adams ‡	Baroness Adams of Craigielea	of Craigielea in Renfrewshire		
346	29 June 2005	Clive Soley ‡	Baron Soley	of Hammersmith in the London Borough of Hammersmith and Fulham	19 January 2023	
347	29 June 2005	Jean Corston ‡	Baroness Corston	of St George in the County and City of Bristol	9 July 2024	
348	19 July 2005	Alastair Goodlad ‡	Baron Goodlad	of Lincoln in the County of Lincolnshire	29 February 2024	
349	6 September 2005	Martin Rees †	Baron Rees of Ludlow	of Ludlow in the County of Shropshire		
350	7 September 2005	Adair Turner †	Baron Turner of Ecchinswell	of Ecchinswell in the County of Hampshire		
351	5 October 2005	Ruth Deech †	Baroness Deech	of Cumnor in the County of Oxfordshire		
352	10 October 2005	Jo Valentine †	Baroness Valentine	of Putney in the London Borough of Wandsworth		
353	11 October 2005	Andrew Turnbull	Baron Turnbull	of Enfield in the London Borough of Enfield		
354	12 October 2005	Michael Hastings †	Baron Hastings of Scarisbrick	of Scarisbrick in the County of Lancashire		
355	22 March 2006	Neil Davidson	Baron Davidson of Glen Clova	of Glen Clova in Angus		
356	28 April 2006	Nigel Crisp	Baron Crisp	of Eaglescliffe in the County of Durham		
357	26 May 2006	John Lee ‡	Baron Lee of Trafford	of Bowdon in the County of Cheshire		
358	26 May 2006	Celia Thomas	Baroness Thomas of Winchester	of Winchester in the County of Hampshire		
359	30 May 2006	Brian Cotter ‡	Baron Cotter	of Congresbury in the County of Somerset		14 November 2023
360	30 May 2006	Joyce Quin ‡ #	Baroness Quin	of Gateshead in the County of Tyne and Wear	19 December 2024	
361	31 May 2006	John Taylor	Baron Taylor of Holbeach	of South Holland in the County of Lincolnshire		
362	31 May 2006	John Burnett ‡	Baron Burnett	of Whitchurch in the County of Devon		
363	1 June 2006	Denise Kingsmill	Baroness Kingsmill	of Holland Park in the Royal Borough of Kensington and Chelsea		
364	1 June 2006	Robin Teverson #	Baron Teverson	of Tregony in the County of Cornwall		
365	2 June 2006	David Trimble ‡	Baron Trimble	of Lisnagarvey in the County of Antrim		25 July 2022
366	2 June 2006	Sandip Verma	Baroness Verma	of Leicester in the County of Leicestershire		
367	5 June 2006	Maggie Jones	Baroness Jones of Whitchurch	of Whitchurch in the County of South Glamorgan		
368	5 June 2006	Margaret Ford	Baroness Ford	of Cunninghame in North Ayrshire	18 December 2025	
369	6 June 2006	Rodney Leach	Baron Leach of Fairford	of Fairford in the County of Gloucestershire		12 June 2016
370	6 June 2006	Mohamed Sheikh	Baron Sheikh	of Cornhill in the City of London		22 September 2022
371	7 June 2006	Maurice Morrow	Baron Morrow	of Clogher Valley in the County of Tyrone		
372	7 June 2006	Bill Morris	Baron Morris of Handsworth	of Handsworth in the County of West Midlands	21 July 2020	
373	8 June 2006	Jonathan Marland	Baron Marland	of Odstock in the County of Wiltshire		
374	8 June 2006	Kamlesh Patel †	Baron Patel of Bradford	of Bradford in the County of West Yorkshire		
375	9 June 2006	Sandy Bruce-Lockhart	Baron Bruce-Lockhart	of the Weald in the County of Kent		14 August 2008
376	9 June 2006	David James	Baron James of Blackheath	of Wildbrooks in the County of West Sussex		
377	12 June 2006	Keith Bradley ‡	Baron Bradley	of Withington in the County of Greater Manchester		
378	12 June 2006	Wallace Browne	Baron Browne of Belmont	of Belmont in the County of Antrim		
379	13 June 2006	Elizabeth Butler-Sloss †	Baroness Butler-Sloss	of Marsh Green in the County of Devon		
380	13 June 2006	Colin Low †	Baron Low of Dalston	of Dalston in the London Borough of Hackney	15 May 2026	
381	14 June 2006	Eileen Paisley	Baroness Paisley of St George's	of St George's in the County of Antrim	30 October 2017	
382	14 June 2006	Colin Boyd	Baron Boyd of Duncansby	of Duncansby in Caithness		
383	15 June 2006	David Rowe-Beddoe †	Baron Rowe-Beddoe	of Kilgetty in the County of Dyfed		15 November 2023
384	15 June 2006	Geoffrey Dear †	Baron Dear	of Willersey in the County of Gloucestershire		
385	16 June 2006	Karan Bilimoria †	Baron Bilimoria	of Chelsea in the Royal Borough of Kensington and Chelsea		
386	16 June 2006	Molly Meacher, Lady Layard †	Baroness Meacher	of Spitalfields in the London Borough of Tower Hamlets	28 October 2025	
387	30 June 2006	Richard Harries	Baron Harries of Pentregarth	of Ceinewydd in the County of Dyfed		29 April 2026
388	18 September 2006	Michael Jay	Baron Jay of Ewelme	of Ewelme in the County of Oxfordshire		
389	19 December 2006	Michael Walker	Baron Walker of Aldringham	of Aldringham in the County of Suffolk		
390	23 March 2007	Jean Coussins †	Baroness Coussins	of Whitehall Park in the London Borough of Islington		
391	26 March 2007	Paul Bew †	Baron Bew	of Donegore in the County of Antrim		
392	27 March 2007	Khalid Hameed †	Baron Hameed	of Hampstead in the London Borough of Camden		
393	28 March 2007	John Krebs †	Baron Krebs	of Wytham in the County of Oxfordshire		
394	29 March 2007	Andrew Mawson †	Baron Mawson	of Bromley-by-Bow in the London Borough of Tower Hamlets		
395	30 March 2007	Jane Campbell †	Baroness Campbell of Surbiton	of Surbiton in the Royal Borough of Kingston upon Thames		

† recommended by House of Lords Appointments Commission
‡ former MP
# former MEP

== Gordon Brown (2007–2010) ==
Living
Living but left the House of Lords

Number	Date of creation	Name	Title	Territorial qualification	Date of retirement (if applicable)	Date of extinction (if applicable)
1	9 July 2007	Mark Malloch Brown	Baron Malloch-Brown	of St Leonard's Forest in the County of West Sussex		
2	9 July 2007	Alan West	Baron West of Spithead	of Seaview in the County of Isle of Wight		
3	10 July 2007	Digby Jones	Baron Jones of Birmingham	of Alvechurch and of Bromsgrove in the County of Worcestershire	31 August 2020	
4	11 July 2007	Shriti Vadera	Baroness Vadera	of Holland Park in the Royal Borough of Kensington and Chelsea		
5	12 July 2007	Ara Darzi	Baron Darzi of Denham	of Gerrards Cross in the County of Buckinghamshire		
6	10 October 2007	Robin Janvrin	Baron Janvrin	of Chalford Hill in the County of Gloucestershire		
7	11 October 2007	Sayeeda Warsi	Baroness Warsi	of Dewsbury in the County of West Yorkshire		
8	15 October 2007	Pauline Neville-Jones	Baroness Neville-Jones	of Hutton Roof in the County of Cumbria		
9	16 October 2007	Susan Garden, Lady Garden	Baroness Garden of Frognal	of Hampstead in the London Borough of Camden		
10	17 October 2007	Jim Wallace ‡	Baron Wallace of Tankerness	of Tankerness in Orkney		29 January 2026
11	10 December 2007	Nicholas Stern †	Baron Stern of Brentford	of Elsted in the County of West Sussex and of Wimbledon in the London Borough of Merton		
12	11 December 2007	Haleh Afshar †	Baroness Afshar	of Heslington in the County of North Yorkshire		12 May 2022
13	28 May 2008	John Mogg †	Baron Mogg	of Queen's Park in the County of East Sussex	14 January 2019	
14	29 May 2008	Robert Smith †	Baron Smith of Kelvin	of Kelvin in the City of Glasgow		
15	2 June 2008	Eliza Manningham-Buller †	Baroness Manningham-Buller	of Northampton in the County of Northamptonshire		
16	30 June 2008	Michael Bates ‡	Baron Bates	of Langbaurgh in the County of North Yorkshire		
17	1 October 2008	Igor Judge	Baron Judge	of Draycote in the County of Warwickshire		7 November 2023
18	13 October 2008	Peter Mandelson ‡	Baron Mandelson	of Foy in the County of Herefordshire and of Hartlepool in the County of Durham	4 February 2026	
19	15 October 2008	Stephen Carter	Baron Carter of Barnes	of Barnes in the London Borough of Richmond upon Thames	28 March 2025	
20	16 October 2008	Paul Myners	Baron Myners	of Truro in the County of Cornwall		16 January 2022
21	3 November 2008	David Pannick †	Baron Pannick	of Radlett in the County of Hertfordshire		
22	10 November 2008	Sue Campbell †	Baroness Campbell of Loughborough	of Loughborough in the County of Leicestershire		
23	2 February 2009	Mervyn Davies	Baron Davies of Abersoch	of Abersoch in the County of Gwynedd		
24	29 May 2009	Tony Clarke	Baron Clarke of Stone-cum-Ebony	of Stone-cum-Ebony in the County of Kent	14 September 2020	16 April 2026
25	27 June 2009	David Freud	Baron Freud	of Eastry in the County of Kent		
26	30 June 2009	Glenys Kinnock, Lady Kinnock #	Baroness Kinnock of Holyhead	of Holyhead in the County of Ynys Môn	9 April 2021	3 December 2023
27	20 July 2009	Alan Sugar	Baron Sugar	of Clapton in the London Borough of Hackney		
28	25 August 2009	Michael Martin ‡	Baron Martin of Springburn	of Port Dundas in the City of Glasgow		29 April 2018
29	1 September 2009	Jonathan Sacks †	Baron Sacks	of Aldgate in the City of London		7 November 2020
30	11 September 2009	Nuala O'Loan †	Baroness O'Loan	of Kirkinriola in the County of Antrim		
31	19 March 2010	Tony Hall †	Baron Hall of Birkenhead	of Birkenhead in the County of Cheshire		
32	22 March 2010	Ajay Kakkar †	Baron Kakkar	of Loxbeare in the County of Devon		
33	23 March 2010	Tanni Grey-Thompson †	Baroness Grey-Thompson	of Eaglescliffe in the County of Durham		
34	24 March 2010	Michael Bichard †	Baron Bichard	of Nailsworth in the County of Gloucestershire		

† recommended by House of Lords Appointments Commission
‡ former MP
# former MEP

== See also ==
- List of life peerages (complete list of life peerages granted since 1958)
- List of hereditary peers in the House of Lords by virtue of a life peerage
