= The Survivor (Cain novel) =

2008 novel by Tom Cain

- Author: Tom Cain
- Language: English
- Series: Samuel Carver series
- Genre: Thriller
- Publisher: Bantam Press / Corgi
- Publication date: 28 July 2008
- Publication place: England
- Media type: Print
- Pages: 398
- ISBN: 978-0-593-05850-3
- OCLC: 242137313
- Preceded by: The Accident Man (2007)
- Followed by: Assassin (2009)

The Survivor is the second novel of the Samuel Carver series by English thriller writer, Tom Cain, released on 7 July 2008 through Bantam Press. The novel was (somewhat paradoxically) released under the title No Survivors to the American audience.

== Plot ==
The novel opens with Samuel Carver masquerading as a maintenance man. He sabotages the executive jet of wealthy Texan businessman Waylon McCabe. The sabotage fails and McCabe begins to suspect that he was the target of an assassination as opposed to a victim of a freak accident. The novel then jumps forward to continue the story of Cain's first novel, The Accident Man. Carver is recovering in a Swiss hospital and attempting to regain memories lost during the torture by that book's villain.

The story centres around McCabe's attempt to obtain a lost Russian suitcase nuke in an effort to instigate a nuclear holocaust that would bring about the rapture; Carver aims to stop him.

== Reception ==
The novel was relatively well-received, with reviewers praising its action scenes and complicated plot. Other critics of the novel cite Carver's relationship with Petrova and the impact of the first novel's subject material as flaws.

The Weekly Times stated that the book is "a complicated, complex and entertaining thriller". Writing for The Star-Ledger, Glenn Speer stated that "The action moves at a rapid clip due to Cain's short, snappy chapters that no doubt will ... enrapture his fans". Publishers Weekly were less effusive in their praise, simply stating that "most thriller fans will enjoy this roller-coaster action adventure ride". Jeremy Jehu, reviewing for The Daily Telegraph gave the novel a mixed review, stating, "it's good, but saving the world just doesn't resonate like offing the People's Princess". Jehu also noted the difficulty in surpassing the earlier work's storyline. Sue Gammon, in a review for the Australian Broadcasting Corporation awarded the novel a rating of two and a half stars out of five, stating Cain's writing "isn't as polished as Childs", although she notes that this is only Cain's second novel. She also stated that she found the scenes concerning the relationship between Carver and Petrova to be "where the plot drags"; she does, however, praise the novel's action scenes.
