= Diana Thomas (writer) =

English journalist and novelist

- Born: David Thomas; 17 January 1959 (age 67)
- Education: King's College, Cambridge (BA)
- Occupation: Author
- Relatives: Susan Thomas (mother)
- Writing career
- Pen name: Tom Cain
- Genre: Thriller
- Notable work: Samuel Carver series
- Notable awards: Young Journalist of the Year
- Website: accidentman.blogspot.com

Diana Thomas (formerly David Thomas; born 17 January 1959), better known by the pen name Tom Cain, is an English journalist and author of a series of thriller novels about protagonist Samuel Carver.

== Biography ==
Thomas' mother was the Liberal Democrat peer Baroness Thomas of Walliswood. Her father was a British diplomat, David Churchill Thomas. For the first few years of her life, Thomas lived in Moscow and she has also lived in Washington, D.C., and Havana, Cuba. She was educated at Eton College and King's College, Cambridge, where she read History of Art.

She spent 25 years as a journalist, working for publications such as The Daily Mail and The Mail on Sunday. She was mocked in Private Eye for her frequent contributions to these newspapers, being satirised as "Daily Thomas of the David Mail". She worked as a TV reporter on Film '82. In 1989, she became the youngest ever editor of Punch magazine, a role she held for three years. In 1995, her comic novel Girl was published. In this, a man enters the hospital for minor surgery but accidentally receives the sex reassignment surgery intended for another patient. Between 2007 and 2012, she wrote a well-received series of thrillers about a former Royal Marine, turned assassin, Samuel Carver.

In 2019, Thomas began writing a column in the Daily Telegraph - A New Woman - about transitioning to become a woman, Diana Thomas. Julie Bindel, the feminist activist and writer, has criticised the column, pointing out that Thomas was previously a men's rights activist. Bindel described Thomas's 1992 book Not Guilty: The Case in Defence of Men, as "a rant about how feminists have the brass neck to blame men for the terrible things they do to women, rather than themselves." Bindel concludes of Thomas's views on women: "While feminists fight for the right for women to break free of oppressive sex stereotypes, the likes of Thomas claim them for [herself]." The column ended on 19 December 2020, with Thomas bidding an emotional farewell to her readers as she reflected on her harrowing transgender journey.

As Diana Thomas, she has written in her defence that transitioning could be considered analogous to immigration: ‘If someone born in India comes to Britain legally, passes the citizenship test and gets a UK passport, who dares say, “You’re not British”? Only a racist. Well, as far as the law goes, when I get a Gender Recognition Certificate, I’ll be a woman, just as that immigrant is British and denying that fact would be no better than racial prejudice.'

Her writing influences include Lee Child, Ian Fleming, and George Macdonald Fraser.

== Books ==
- 1993 Not guilty: men, the case for the defence
- 1995 Girl

=== Samuel Carver series ===
- 2007 The Accident Man
- 2008 The Survivor (US title: No Survivors)
- 2009 Assassin
- 2010 Dictator
- 2011 Carver
- 2012 Revenger
