= Terence Thomas, Baron Thomas of Macclesfield =

British politician and banker

The Right Honourable The Lord Thomas of Macclesfield CBE
- Thomas in 2008

Member of the House of Lords
- Lord Temporal
- Life peerage 5 November 1997 – 18 May 2016

Personal details
- Born: 19 October 1937
- Died: 1 July 2018 (aged 80)

Terence James Thomas, Baron Thomas of Macclesfield, CBE (19 October 1937 – 1 July 2018) was a British politician and banker, member of the Labour and Co-operative parties.

== Career ==
Thomas was a pupil at Queen Elizabeth Grammar School in Carmarthen, where his father (William Emrys Thomas 1911–1993) was a transport manager and his mother (Mildred Evelyn née James) ran a greengrocery. He did his national service in the army, serving at Shrapnel Barracks in Woolwich, south east London. He then joined the National Provincial Bank.

Thomas joined the Co-operative Bank in 1973 as marketing manager. He was chief executive of the bank for nine years, before retiring in the late 1990s. He suffered a stroke in 1999; in his 2010 autobiography, he says this was caused by a hole in the heart of which he had been unaware.

He was Chairman of the East Manchester Partnership (1990–1996) and founding Chairman of the North West Partnership. Thomas later was Chair of Capita Group (1997–98). He was a member of the House of Lords Monetary Policy & European Affairs Select Committees. He is a member of the Regional Policy Forum, President of the Society for Co-operative Studies, Honorary President of the North West Co-operative and Mutual Council and Life President of the North West Business Leadership Team.

He died on 1 July 2018 at the age of 80.

== Honours ==
Having been appointed a Commander of the Order of the British Empire (CBE) in the 1997 Birthday Honours, he was created a life peer as Baron Thomas of Macclesfield, of Prestbury in the County of Cheshire on 5 November 1997. He sat in the House of Lords until 18 May 2016, at which point he ceased to be a member pursuant to section 2 of the House of Lords Reform Act 2014, having failed to attend during the whole of the 2015-16 session without being on leave of absence.

Coat of arms of Terence Thomas, Baron Thomas of Macclesfield
Crest A demi-lion with dragon's wings Gules holding in the sinister paw three daffodils Or slipped Argent. Escutcheon Azure three bars potenty on the upper edge Argent fracted and parted by three garbs in pale Or. Supporters On either side a dragon Gules dimidating fesswise a lion also Gules each gorged with a plain collar attached thereto a chain reflexed over the back and holding in the exterior forepaw three daffodils also Or slipped Argent. Motto An Inclusive Community With Integrity
