= List of life peerages (1979–1997) =

Peerages and baronetcies of Britain and Ireland
| Extant | All |
|---|---|
| Dukes | Dukedoms |
| Marquesses | Marquessates |
| Earls | Earldoms |
| Viscounts | Viscountcies |
| Barons | Baronies |
En, Sc, GB, Ire, UK (law, life: 1958–1979, 1979–1997, 1997–2010, 2010–2024, 2024–present)
| Baronets | Baronetcies |

This is a list of life peerages in the Peerage of the United Kingdom created under the Life Peerages Act 1958 from 1979 to 1997, during the tenures of the Conservative prime ministers Margaret Thatcher and John Major.

== Margaret Thatcher (1979–1990) ==
Living
Living but left the House of Lords

| Number | Date of creation | Name | Title | Territorial qualification | Date of retirement (if applicable) | Date of extinction (if applicable) |
|---|---|---|---|---|---|---|
| 1 | 21 May 1979 | Irwin Bellow | Baron Bellwin | of the City of Leeds | | 11 February 2001 |
| 2 | 3 July 1979 | Harold Lever ‡ | Baron Lever of Manchester | of Cheetham in the City of Manchester | | 6 August 1995 |
| 3 | 5 July 1979 | Michael Stewart ‡ # | Baron Stewart of Fulham | of Fulham in Greater London | | 10 March 1990 |
| 4 | 6 July 1979 | James Mackay | Baron Mackay of Clashfern | of Eddrachillis in the District of Sutherland | 22 July 2022 | 7 July 2026 |
| 5 | 9 July 1979 | George Strauss ‡ | Baron Strauss | of Vauxhall in the London Borough of Lambeth | | 5 June 1993 |
| 6 | 10 July 1979 | Sydney Irving ‡ | Baron Irving of Dartford | of Dartford in the County of Kent | | 18 December 1989 |
| 7 | 10 July 1979 | Myer Galpern ‡ | Baron Galpern | of Shettleston in the District of the City of Glasgow | | 23 September 1993 |
| 8 | 11 July 1979 | Lena Jeger ‡ | Baroness Jeger | of St Pancras in Greater London | | 26 February 2007 |
| 9 | 11 July 1979 | David Renton ‡ | Baron Renton | of Huntingdon in the County of Cambridgeshire | | 24 May 2007 |
| 10 | 12 July 1979 | Joseph Godber ‡ | Baron Godber of Willington | of Willington in the County of Bedfordshire | | 25 August 1980 |
| 11 | 12 July 1979 | Reg Underhill | Baron Underhill | of Leyton in Greater London | | 12 March 1993 |
| 12 | 16 July 1979 | Cledwyn Hughes ‡ | Baron Cledwyn of Penrhos | of Holyhead in the Isle of Anglesey | | 22 February 2001 |
| 13 | 17 July 1979 | John Brooks | Baron Brooks of Tremorfa | of Tremorfa in the County of South Glamorgan | | 4 March 2016 |
| 14 | 18 July 1979 | Robert Lowry | Baron Lowry | of Crossgar in the County of Down | | 15 January 1999 |
| 15 | 19 July 1979 | Ralph Harris | Baron Harris of High Cross | of Tottenham in Greater London | | 19 October 2006 |
| 16 | 24 July 1979 | Willie Ross ‡ | Baron Ross of Marnock | of Kilmarnock in the District of Kilmarnock and Loudoun | | 10 June 1988 |
| 17 | 25 July 1979 | Oscar Murton ‡ | Baron Murton of Lindisfarne | of Hexham in the County of Northumberland | | 5 July 2009 |
| 18 | 26 July 1979 | Emlyn Hooson ‡ | Baron Hooson | of Montgomery in the County of Powys and of Colomendy in the County of Clwyd | | 21 February 2012 |
| 19 | 30 July 1979 | Jean McFarlane | Baroness McFarlane of Llandaff | of Llandaff in the County of South Glamorgan | | 13 May 2012 |
| 20 | 6 August 1979 | Diana Neave | Baroness Airey of Abingdon | of Abingdon in the County of Oxford | | 27 November 1992 |
| 21 | 7 August 1979 | Richard Wood ‡ | Baron Holderness | of Bishop Wilton in the County of Humberside | | 11 August 2002 |
| 22 | 7 September 1979 | David Gibson-Watt ‡ | Baron Gibson-Watt | of the Wye in the District of Radnor | | 7 February 2002 |
| 23 | 27 September 1979 | Hugh Trevor-Roper (Note: In remainder to the Barony of Teynham (England).) | Baron Dacre of Glanton | of Glanton in the County of Northumberland | | 26 January 2003 |
| 24 | 2 October 1979 | Betty Harvie Anderson ‡ | Baroness Skrimshire of Quarter | of Dunipace in the District of Falkirk | | 7 November 1979 |
| 25 | 28 January 1980 | Donald Coggan | Baron Coggan | of Canterbury and of Sissinghurst in the County of Kent | | 17 May 2000 |
| 26 | 4 February 1980 | Jean Barker | Baroness Trumpington | of Sandwich in the County of Kent | 24 October 2017 | 26 November 2018 |
| 27 | 6 February 1980 | Kenneth Keith | Baron Keith of Castleacre | of Swaffham in the County of Norfolk | | 1 September 2004 |
| 28 | 8 February 1980 | John Hunt | Baron Hunt of Tanworth | of Stratford-upon-Avon in the County of Warwickshire | | 17 July 2008 |
| 29 | 11 February 1980 | George Emslie, Lord Emslie | Baron Emslie | of Potterton in the District of Gordon | | 21 November 2002 |
| 30 | 14 February 1980 | Marcus Sieff | Baron Sieff of Brimpton | of Brimpton in the Royal County of Berkshire | | 23 February 2001 |
| 31 | 21 February 1980 | Edwin McAlpine (Note: Inherited the McAlpine baronetcy in 1983.) | Baron McAlpine of Moffat | of Medmenham in the County of Buckinghamshire | | 7 January 1990 |
| 32 | 10 July 1980 | Tom Boardman ‡ | Baron Boardman | of Welford in the County of Northamptonshire | | 10 March 2003 |
| 33 | 11 July 1980 | Frank Marshall | Baron Marshall of Leeds | of Shadwell in the City of Leeds | | 1 November 1990 |
| 34 | 17 July 1980 | Arnold Weinstock | Baron Weinstock | of Bowden in the County of Wiltshire | | 23 July 2002 |
| 35 | 22 July 1980 | Victor Matthews | Baron Matthews | of Southgate in the London Borough of Enfield | | 5 December 1995 |
| 36 | 1 September 1980 | Francis McFadzean | Baron McFadzean of Kelvinside | of Kelvinside in the District of the City of Glasgow | | 23 May 1992 |
| 37 | 2 February 1981 | Henry Benson | Baron Benson | of Drovers in the County of West Sussex | | 5 March 1995 |
| 38 | 16 February 1981 | Michael Swann | Baron Swann | of Coln St. Denys in the County of Gloucestershire | | 22 September 1990 |
| 39 | 11 May 1981 | Geoffrey Tordoff | Baron Tordoff | of Knutsford in the County of Cheshire | 13 October 2016 | 22 June 2019 |
| 40 | 12 May 1981 | William Molloy ‡ # | Baron Molloy | of Ealing in Greater London | | 26 May 2001 |
| 41 | 14 May 1981 | Hugh Jenkins ‡ | Baron Jenkins of Putney | of Wandsworth in Greater London | | 26 January 2004 |
| 42 | 18 May 1981 | John Mackie ‡ | Baron John-Mackie | of Nazeing in the County of Essex | | 26 May 1994 |
| 43 | 19 May 1981 | Felicity Lane-Fox | Baroness Lane-Fox | of Bramham in the County of West Yorkshire | | 17 April 1988 |
| 44 | 21 May 1981 | Edward Bishop ‡ | Baron Bishopston | of Newark in the County of Nottinghamshire | | 19 April 1984 |
| 45 | 22 May 1981 | Jane Ewart-Biggs | Baroness Ewart-Biggs | of Ellis Green in the County of Essex | | 8 October 1992 |
| 46 | 26 May 1981 | Max Beloff | Baron Beloff | of Wolvercote in the County of Oxfordshire | | 22 March 1999 |
| 47 | 27 May 1981 | Elystan Morgan ‡ | Baron Elystan-Morgan | of Aberteifi in the County of Dyfed | 12 February 2020 | 7 July 2021 |
| 48 | 28 May 1981 | Beryl Platt | Baroness Platt of Writtle | of Writtle in the County of Essex | | 1 February 2015 |
| 49 | 29 May 1981 | Desmond Plummer | Baron Plummer of St. Marylebone | of the City of Westminster | | 2 October 2009 |
| 50 | 1 June 1981 | Anthony Stodart ‡ | Baron Stodart of Leaston | of Humbie in the District of East Lothian | | 31 May 2003 |
| 51 | 2 June 1981 | Alan Campbell | Baron Campbell of Alloway | of Ayr in the District of Kyle and Carrick | | 30 June 2013 |
| 52 | 16 June 1981 | Hugh Thomas | Baron Thomas of Swynnerton | of Notting Hill in Greater London | | 7 May 2017 |
| 53 | 19 June 1981 | Trixie Gardner | Baroness Gardner of Parkes | of Southgate in Greater London and of Parkes in the State of New South Wales and Commonwealth of Australia | | 14 April 2024 |
| 54 | 6 July 1981 | Christopher Mayhew ‡ | Baron Mayhew | of Wimbledon in Greater London | | 7 January 1997 |
| 55 | 15 July 1981 | Richard Marsh ‡ | Baron Marsh | of Mannington in the County of Wiltshire | | 29 July 2011 |
| 56 | 21 July 1981 | Theodore Constantine | Baron Constantine of Stanmore | of Stanmore in Greater London | | 13 February 2004 |
| 57 | 22 September 1981 | Lawrence Kadoorie | Baron Kadoorie | of Kowloon in Hong Kong and of the City of Westminster | | 25 August 1993 |
| 58 | 2 February 1982 | Charles Forte | Baron Forte | of Ripley in the County of Surrey | | 28 February 2007 |
| 59 | 8 February 1982 | Sir Nicholas Cayzer, Bt. | Baron Cayzer | of St Mary Axe in the City of London | | 16 April 1999 |
| 60 | 10 February 1982 | Ian Bancroft | Baron Bancroft | of Coatham in the County of Cleveland | | 19 November 1996 |
| 61 | 21 May 1982 | Murray MacLehose | Baron MacLehose of Beoch | of Maybole in the District of Kyle and Carrick and of Victoria in Hong Kong | | 27 May 2000 |
| 62 | 14 July 1982 | Elizabeth Carnegy | Baroness Carnegy of Lour | of Lour in the District of Angus | | 9 November 2010 |
| 63 | 16 July 1982 | Raymond Pennock | Baron Pennock | of Norton in the County of Cleveland | | 23 February 1993 |
| 64 | 20 July 1982 | Joe Gormley | Baron Gormley | of Ashton-in-Makerfield in Greater Manchester | | 27 May 1993 |
| 65 | 19 November 1982 | Terence Lewin | Baron Lewin | of Greenwich in Greater London | | 23 January 1999 |
| 66 | 17 January 1983 | Andrew McIntosh | Baron McIntosh of Haringey | of Haringey in Greater London | | 27 August 2010 |
| 67 | 20 January 1983 | Wendy Nicol | Baroness Nicol | of Newnham in the County of Cambridgeshire | | 15 January 2018 |
| 68 | 24 January 1983 | Caroline Cox | Baroness Cox | of Queensbury in Greater London | | |
| 69 | 27 January 1983 | Francis Taylor | Baron Taylor of Hadfield | of Hadfield in the County of Derbyshire | | 15 February 1995 |
| 70 | 31 January 1983 | John Taylor | Baron Ingrow | of Keighley in the County of West Yorkshire | | 7 February 2002 |
| 71 | 2 February 1983 | Derek Ezra | Baron Ezra | of Horsham in the County of West Sussex | | 22 December 2015 |
| 72 | 3 February 1983 | Derek Rayner | Baron Rayner | of Crowborough in the County of East Sussex | | 26 June 1998 |
| 73 | 7 February 1983 | Anthony Quinton | Baron Quinton | of Holywell in the City of Oxford and County of Oxfordshire | | 19 June 2010 |
| 74 | 9 February 1983 | Gwilym Prys Davies | Baron Prys-Davies | of Llanegryn in the County of Gwynedd | 23 May 2015 | 28 March 2017 |
| 75 | 10 February 1983 | Peter Thomas Bauer | Baron Bauer | of Market Ward in the City of Cambridge | | 3 May 2002 |
| 76 | 11 February 1983 | Gordon Richardson | Baron Richardson of Duntisbourne | of Duntisbourne in the County of Gloucestershire | | 22 January 2010 |
| 77 | 14 March 1983 | Neil Cameron | Baron Cameron of Balhousie | of Balhousie in the District of Perth and Kinross | | 29 January 1985 |
| 78 | 28 March 1983 | John Gallacher | Baron Gallacher | of Enfield in Greater London | | 4 January 2004 |
| 79 | 30 June 1983 | James Hanson | Baron Hanson | of Edgerton in the County of West Yorkshire | | 1 November 2004 |
| 80 | 1 July 1983 | George Howard (Note: In remainder to the Earldom of Carlisle (England).) | Baron Howard of Henderskelfe | of Henderskelfe in the County of North Yorkshire | | 27 November 1984 |
| 81 | 4 July 1983 | Hamish Gray ‡ | Baron Gray of Contin | of Contin in the District of Ross and Cromarty | | 14 March 2006 |
| 82 | 15 July 1983 | John King | Baron King of Wartnaby | of Wartnaby in the County of Leicestershire | | 12 July 2005 |
| 83 | 5 September 1983 | Stuart Blanch | Baron Blanch | of Bishopthorpe in the County of North Yorkshire | | 3 June 1994 |
| 84 | 7 September 1983 | Jock Stallard ‡ | Baron Stallard | of St Pancras in the London Borough of Camden | | 29 March 2008 |
| 85 | 9 September 1983 | David Ennals ‡ | Baron Ennals | of Norwich in the County of Norfolk | | 17 June 1995 |
| 86 | 12 September 1983 | Ted Graham ‡ | Baron Graham of Edmonton | of Edmonton in Greater London | | 21 March 2020 |
| 87 | 14 September 1983 | David Stoddart ‡ | Baron Stoddart of Swindon | of Reading in the Royal County of Berkshire | | 14 November 2020 |
| 88 | 16 September 1983 | Harold Wilson ‡ | Baron Wilson of Rievaulx | of Kirklees in the County of West Yorkshire | | 24 May 1995 |
| 89 | 19 September 1983 | Angus Maude ‡ | Baron Maude of Stratford-upon-Avon | of Stratford-upon-Avon in the County of Warwickshire | | 9 November 1993 |
| 90 | 21 September 1983 | Sir Derek Walker-Smith, Bt. ‡ # | Baron Broxbourne | of Broxbourne in the County of Hertfordshire | | 22 January 1992 |
| 91 | 23 September 1983 | Sir Donald Kaberry Bt. ‡ | Baron Kaberry of Adel | of Adel in the City of Leeds | | 13 March 1991 |
| 92 | 27 September 1983 | Anthony Royle ‡ | Baron Fanshawe of Richmond | of South Cerney in the County of Gloucestershire | | 28 December 2001 |
| 93 | 28 September 1983 | Joseph Dean ‡ | Baron Dean of Beswick | of West Leeds in the County of West Yorkshire | | 26 February 1999 |
| 94 | 30 September 1983 | Joel Barnett ‡ | Baron Barnett | of Heywood and Royton in Greater Manchester | | 1 November 2014 |
| 95 | 3 October 1983 | Sir John Eden, Bt. ‡ | Baron Eden of Winton | of Rushyford in the County of Durham | 11 June 2015 | 23 May 2020 |
| 96 | 5 October 1983 | John Peyton ‡ | Baron Peyton of Yeovil | of Yeovil in the County of Somerset | | 22 November 2006 |
| 97 | 7 October 1983 | Jock Bruce-Gardyne ‡ | Baron Bruce-Gardyne | of Kirkden in the District of Angus | | 15 April 1990 |
| 98 | 10 October 1983 | Neil Carmichael ‡ | Baron Carmichael of Kelvingrove | of Camlachie in the District of the City of Glasgow | | 19 July 2001 |
| 99 | 12 October 1983 | Jo Grimond ‡ | Baron Grimond | of Firth in the County of Orkney | | 24 October 1993 |
| 100 | 14 October 1983 | Gerry Fitt ‡ | Baron Fitt | of Bell's Hill in the County of Down | | 26 August 2005 |
| 101 | 1 February 1984 | Peter Henderson | Baron Henderson of Brompton | of Brompton in the Royal Borough of Kensington and Chelsea and of Brough in the County of Cumbria | | 13 January 2000 |
| 102 | 2 February 1984 | Alistair McAlpine | Baron McAlpine of West Green | of West Green in the County of Hampshire | 26 May 2010 | 17 January 2014 |
| 103 | 8 June 1984 | Kenneth Cameron | Baron Cameron of Lochbroom | of Lochbroom in the District of Ross and Cromarty | 21 April 2016 | 28 January 2025 |
| 104 | 10 October 1984 | David Young | Baron Young of Graffham | of Graffham in the County of West Sussex | 27 April 2022 | 8 December 2022 |
| 105 | 4 February 1985 | Frank Chapple | Baron Chapple | of Hoxton in Greater London | | 19 October 2004 |
| 106 | 6 February 1985 | Mary Warnock | Baroness Warnock | of Weeke in the City of Winchester | 1 June 2015 | 20 March 2019 |
| 107 | 7 February 1985 | Nigel Vinson | Baron Vinson | of Roddam Dene in the County of Northumberland | 13 July 2022 | |
| 108 | 14 February 1985 | Len Murray | Baron Murray of Epping Forest | of Telford in the County of Shropshire | | 20 May 2004 |
| 109 | 9 May 1985 | Marcus Kimball ‡ | Baron Kimball | of Easton in the County of Leicestershire | | 26 March 2014 |
| 110 | 13 May 1985 | Samuel Silkin ‡ | Baron Silkin of Dulwich | of North Leigh in the County of Oxfordshire | | 17 August 1988 |
| 111 | 15 May 1985 | Jack Butterworth | Baron Butterworth | of Warwick in the County of Warwickshire | | 19 June 2003 |
| 112 | 16 May 1985 | William Elliott ‡ | Baron Elliott of Morpeth | of Morpeth in the County of Northumberland and of the City of Newcastle upon Tyne | | 20 May 2011 |
| 113 | 17 May 1985 | Dick Crawshaw ‡ | Baron Crawshaw of Aintree | of Salford in the County of Greater Manchester | | 16 July 1986 |
| 114 | 21 May 1985 | Bernard Donoughue | Baron Donoughue | of Ashton in the County of Northamptonshire | | |
| 115 | 22 May 1985 | Charles Williams | Baron Williams of Elvel | of Llansantffraed in Elvel in the County of Powys | | 30 December 2019 |
| 116 | 29 May 1985 | Muriel Turner | Baroness Turner of Camden | of Camden in Greater London | 13 June 2017 | 26 February 2018 |
| 117 | 30 May 1985 | Hugh Morton | Baron Morton of Shuna | of Stockbridge in the District of the City of Edinburgh | | 26 April 1995 |
| 118 | 5 June 1985 | Charles Sanderson | Baron Sanderson of Bowden | of Melrose in the District of Ettrick and Lauderdale | 29 March 2018 | 2 July 2026 |
| 119 | 10 June 1985 | Gloria Hooper # | Baroness Hooper | of Liverpool and of St James's in the City of Westminster | | |
| 120 | 13 June 1985 | Leonard Wolfson (Note: Inherited the Wolfson baronetcy in 1991.) | Baron Wolfson | of Marylebone in the City of Westminster | | 20 May 2010 |
| 121 | 12 July 1985 | Bob Mellish ‡ | Baron Mellish | of Bermondsey in Greater London | | 9 May 1998 |
| 122 | 22 July 1985 | Walter Marshall | Baron Marshall of Goring | of South Stoke in the County of Oxfordshire | | 20 February 1996 |
| 123 | 14 February 1986 | Frederick Dainton | Baron Dainton | of Hallam Moors in South Yorkshire | | 5 December 1997 |
| 124 | 21 July 1986 | Mark Bonham Carter ‡ | Baron Bonham-Carter | of Yarnbury in the County of Wiltshire | | 4 September 1994 |
| 125 | 22 July 1986 | Philip Moore | Baron Moore of Wolvercote | of Wolvercote in the City of Oxford | | 7 April 2009 |
| 126 | 23 September 1986 | Bill Deedes ‡ | Baron Deedes | of Aldington in the County of Kent | | 17 August 2007 |
| 127 | 3 February 1987 | Woodrow Wyatt ‡ | Baron Wyatt of Weeford | of Weeford in the County of Staffordshire | | 7 December 1997 |
| 128 | 9 February 1987 | Edwin Bramall | Baron Bramall | of Bushfield in the County of Hampshire | 25 April 2013 | 12 November 2019 |
| 129 | 18 March 1987 | Tessa Blackstone | Baroness Blackstone | of Stoke Newington in Greater London | | |
| 130 | 23 March 1987 | Denis Carter | Baron Carter | of Devizes in the County of Wiltshire | | 18 December 2006 |
| 131 | 24 March 1987 | Maurice Peston | Baron Peston | of Mile End in Greater London | | 23 April 2016 |
| 132 | 25 March 1987 | Derry Irvine | Baron Irvine of Lairg | of Lairg in the District of Sutherland | 11 May 2026 | |
| 133 | 27 March 1987 | David Stevens | Baron Stevens of Ludgate | of Ludgate in the City of London | | |
| 134 | 30 March 1987 | Charles Johnston | Baron Johnston of Rockport | of Caversham in the Royal County of Berkshire | | 30 April 2002 |
| 135 | 31 March 1987 | David Basnett | Baron Basnett | of Leatherhead in the County of Surrey | | 25 January 1989 |
| 136 | 3 April 1987 | Anthony Trafford ‡ | Baron Trafford | of Falmer in the County of East Sussex | | 16 September 1989 |
| 137 | 6 April 1987 | Henry Plumb # | Baron Plumb | of Coleshill in the County of Warwickshire | 3 November 2017 | 15 April 2022 |
| 138 | 7 April 1987 | Emily Blatch | Baroness Blatch | of Hinchingbrooke in the County of Cambridgeshire | | 31 May 2005 |
| 139 | 8 April 1987 | James Goold | Baron Goold | of Waterfoot in the District of Eastwood | | 27 July 1997 |
| 140 | 22 June 1987 | Michael Havers ‡ | Baron Havers | of St Edmundsbury in the County of Suffolk | | 1 April 1992 |
| 141 | 14 July 1987 | Henry Chilver | Baron Chilver | of Cranfield in the County of Bedfordshire | | 8 July 2012 |
| 142 | 22 July 1987 | Philip Knights | Baron Knights | of Edgbaston in the County of West Midlands | | 11 December 2014 |
| 143 | 5 October 1987 | Geoffrey Rippon ‡ # | Baron Rippon of Hexham | of Hesleyside in the County of Northumberland | | 28 January 1997 |
| 144 | 6 October 1987 | Michael Cocks ‡ | Baron Cocks of Hartcliffe | of Chinnor in the County of Oxfordshire | | 26 March 2001 |
| 145 | 7 October 1987 | Peter Thomas ‡ | Baron Thomas of Gwydir | of Llanrwst in the County of Gwynedd | | 4 February 2008 |
| 146 | 8 October 1987 | Douglas Jay ‡ | Baron Jay | of Battersea in Greater London | | 6 March 1996 |
| 147 | 9 October 1987 | Francis Pym ‡ | Baron Pym | of Sandy in the County of Bedfordshire | | 7 March 2008 |
| 148 | 12 October 1987 | Sir Keith Joseph, Bt. ‡ | Baron Joseph | of Portsoken in the City of London | | 10 December 1994 |
| 149 | 13 October 1987 | Jack Dormand ‡ | Baron Dormand of Easington | of Easington in the County of Durham | | 18 December 2003 |
| 150 | 14 October 1987 | Jim Prior ‡ | Baron Prior | of Brampton in the County of Suffolk | | 12 December 2016 |
| 151 | 15 October 1987 | Nicholas Edwards ‡ | Baron Crickhowell | of Pont Esgob in the Black Mountains and County of Powys | | 17 March 2018 |
| 152 | 16 October 1987 | Humphrey Atkins ‡ | Baron Colnbrook | of Waltham St Lawrence in the Royal County of Berkshire | | 4 October 1996 |
| 153 | 19 October 1987 | Norman St John-Stevas ‡ | Baron St John of Fawsley | of Preston Capes in the County of Northamptonshire | | 5 March 2012 |
| 154 | 20 October 1987 | Roy Mason ‡ | Baron Mason of Barnsley | of Barnsley in South Yorkshire | | 20 April 2015 |
| 155 | 2 November 1987 | Mark Carlisle ‡ | Baron Carlisle of Bucklow | of Mobberley in the County of Cheshire | | 14 July 2005 |
| 156 | 3 November 1987 | Patrick Jenkin ‡ | Baron Jenkin of Roding | of Wanstead and Woodford in Greater London | 6 January 2015 | 20 December 2016 |
| 157 | 4 November 1987 | Stephen Ross ‡ | Baron Ross of Newport | of Newport in the County of the Isle of Wight | | 10 May 1993 |
| 158 | 5 November 1987 | James Callaghan ‡ | Baron Callaghan of Cardiff | of the City of Cardiff in the County of South Glamorgan | | 26 March 2005 |
| 159 | 16 November 1987 | Peter Rees ‡ | Baron Rees | of Goytre in the County of Gwent | | 30 November 2008 |
| 160 | 20 November 1987 | Roy Jenkins ‡ | Baron Jenkins of Hillhead | of Pontypool in the County of Gwent | | 5 January 2003 |
| 161 | 5 February 1988 | Immanuel Jakobovits | Baron Jakobovits | of Regent's Park in Greater London | | 31 October 1999 |
| 162 | 8 February 1988 | Judith Hart ‡ | Baroness Hart of South Lanark | of Lanark in the County of Lanark | | 8 December 1991 |
| 163 | 15 February 1988 | John Donaldson | Baron Donaldson of Lymington | of Lymington in the County of Hampshire | | 31 August 2005 |
| 164 | 26 February 1988 | Robert Armstrong | Baron Armstrong of Ilminster | of Ashill in the County of Somerset | | 3 April 2020 |
| 165 | 11 July 1988 | Robert Alexander | Baron Alexander of Weedon | of Newcastle-under-Lyme in the County of Staffordshire | | 6 November 2005 |
| 166 | 8 August 1988 | William Rees-Mogg | Baron Rees-Mogg | of Hinton Blewitt in the County of Avon | | 29 December 2012 |
| 167 | 10 August 1988 | John Butterfield | Baron Butterfield | of Stechford in the County of West Midlands | | 22 July 2000 |
| 168 | 18 October 1988 | Alexander Mackenzie Stuart, Lord Mackenzie Stuart | Baron Mackenzie-Stuart | of Dean in the District of the City of Edinburgh | | 1 April 2000 |
| 169 | 9 January 1989 | Donald Macaulay | Baron Macaulay of Bragar | of Bragar in the County of Ross and Cromarty | | 12 June 2014 |
| 170 | 31 January 1989 | John Sainsbury | Baron Sainsbury of Preston Candover | of Preston Candover in the County of Hampshire | | 14 January 2022 |
| 171 | 8 February 1989 | Jack Lewis | Baron Lewis of Newnham | of Newnham in the County of Cambridgeshire | | 17 July 2014 |
| 172 | 9 February 1989 | Sally Oppenheim-Barnes ‡ | Baroness Oppenheim-Barnes | of Gloucester in the County of Gloucestershire | 25 February 2019 | 1 January 2025 |
| 173 | 10 February 1989 | Peter Fraser ‡ | Baron Fraser of Carmyllie | of Carmyllie in the District of Angus | | 23 June 2013 |
| 174 | 21 July 1989 | Eric Sharp | Baron Sharp of Grimsdyke | of Stanmore in the London Borough of Harrow | | 2 May 1994 |
| 175 | 24 July 1989 | John Walton | Baron Walton of Detchant | of Detchant in the County of Northumberland | | 21 April 2016 |
| 176 | 25 July 1989 | Ian McColl | Baron McColl of Dulwich | of Bermondsey in the London Borough of Southwark | | |
| 177 | 26 February 1990 | John Fieldhouse | Baron Fieldhouse | of Gosport in the County of Hampshire | | 17 February 1992 |
| 178 | 27 February 1990 | Daphne Park | Baroness Park of Monmouth | of Broadway in the County of Hereford and Worcester | | 24 March 2010 |
| 179 | 28 February 1990 | Francis Tombs | Baron Tombs | of Brailes in the County of Warwickshire | 31 March 2015 | 11 April 2020 |
| 180 | 8 May 1990 | Stanley Clinton-Davis ‡ | Baron Clinton-Davis | of Hackney in the London Borough of Hackney | 10 January 2018 | 11 June 2023 |
| 181 | 9 May 1990 | Brian Morris | Baron Morris of Castle Morris | of St Dogmaels in the County of Dyfed | | 30 April 2001 |
| 182 | 10 May 1990 | Diana Eccles | Baroness Eccles of Moulton | of Moulton in the County of North Yorkshire | 30 April 2026 | |
| 183 | 14 May 1990 | Ivor Richard ‡ | Baron Richard | of Ammanford in the County of Dyfed | | 18 March 2018 |
| 184 | 16 May 1990 | Oulton Wade | Baron Wade of Chorlton | of Chester in the County of Cheshire | 1 November 2016 | 7 June 2018 |
| 185 | 17 May 1990 | Hugh Cavendish (Note: In remainder to the Dukedom of Devonshire (England).) | Baron Cavendish of Furness | of Cartmel in the County of Cumbria | 1 January 2021 | |
| 186 | 18 May 1990 | Julia Cumberlege | Baroness Cumberlege | of Newick in the County of East Sussex | 20 December 2024 | |
| 187 | 21 May 1990 | Heather Brigstocke | Baroness Brigstocke | of Kensington in the Royal Borough of Kensington and Chelsea | | 30 April 2004 |
| 188 | 22 May 1990 | Lawson Soulsby | Baron Soulsby of Swaffham Prior | of Swaffham Prior in the County of Cambridgeshire | 31 December 2015 | 8 May 2017 |
| 189 | 29 May 1990 | Richard Holme | Baron Holme of Cheltenham | of Cheltenham in the County of Gloucestershire | | 4 May 2008 |
| 190 | 30 May 1990 | Eric Varley ‡ | Baron Varley | of Chesterfield in the County of Derbyshire | | 29 July 2008 |
| 191 | 1 June 1990 | Patricia Hollis | Baroness Hollis of Heigham | of Heigham in the City of Norwich | | 13 October 2018 |
| 192 | 11 June 1990 | Shreela Flather | Baroness Flather | of Windsor and Maidenhead in the Royal County of Berkshire | | 6 February 2024 |
| 193 | 18 June 1990 | Malcolm Pearson | Baron Pearson of Rannoch | of Bridge of Gaur in the District of Perth and Kinross | | |
| 194 | 16 July 1990 | George Porter | Baron Porter of Luddenham | of Luddenham in the County of Kent | | 31 August 2002 |
| 195 | 16 July 1990 | Barbara Castle, Lady Castle ‡ # | Baroness Castle of Blackburn | of Ibstone in the County of Buckinghamshire | | 3 May 2002 |
| 196 | 17 July 1990 | Peter Lane | Baron Lane of Horsell | of Woking in the County of Surrey | | 9 January 2009 |
| 197 | 13 August 1990 | Robert Haslam | Baron Haslam | of Bolton in the County of Greater Manchester | | 2 November 2002 |
| 198 | 24 August 1990 | Lydia Dunn | Baroness Dunn | of Hong Kong Island in Hong Kong and of Knightsbridge in the Royal Borough of Kensington and Chelsea | 30 June 2010 | |

‡ former MP
# former MEP

== John Major (1990–1997) ==
Living
Living but left the House of Lords

| Number | Date of creation | Name | Title | Territorial qualification | Date of retirement (if applicable) | Date of extinction (if applicable) |
|---|---|---|---|---|---|---|
| 1 | 4 December 1990 | David Waddington ‡ | Baron Waddington | of Read in the County of Lancashire | 26 March 2015 | 23 February 2017 |
| 2 | 17 January 1991 | Jeffrey Sterling | Baron Sterling of Plaistow | of Pall Mall in the City of Westminster | | |
| 3 | 25 January 1991 | Gordon White | Baron White of Hull | of Hull in the County of Humberside | | 23 August 1995 |
| 4 | 1 February 1991 | Robert Runcie | Baron Runcie | of Cuddesdon in the County of Oxfordshire | | 11 July 2000 |
| 5 | 4 February 1991 | Peter Palumbo | Baron Palumbo | of Walbrook in the City of London | 2 September 2019 | |
| 6 | 5 February 1991 | Brian Griffiths | Baron Griffiths of Fforestfach | of Fforestfach in the County of West Glamorgan | | |
| 7 | 7 February 1991 | P. D. James | Baroness James of Holland Park | of Southwold in the County of Suffolk | | 27 November 2014 |
| 8 | 8 February 1991 | Hector Laing | Baron Laing of Dunphail | of Dunphail in the District of Moray | | 21 June 2010 |
| 9 | 14 February 1991 | Joan Seccombe | Baroness Seccombe | of Kineton in the County of Warwickshire | | |
| 10 | 26 March 1991 | David Wolfson | Baron Wolfson of Sunningdale | of Trevose in the County of Cornwall | 13 June 2017 | 10 March 2021 |
| 11 | 5 June 1991 | Meghnad Desai | Baron Desai | of St Clement Danes in the City of Westminster | | 29 July 2025 |
| 12 | 6 June 1991 | Sally Hamwee | Baroness Hamwee | of Richmond upon Thames in the London Borough of Richmond upon Thames | | |
| 13 | 7 June 1991 | Mark Schreiber | Baron Marlesford | of Marlesford in the County of Suffolk | | 13 July 2025 |
| 14 | 10 June 1991 | Frank Judd ‡ | Baron Judd | of Portsea in the County of Hampshire | | 18 April 2021 |
| 15 | 11 June 1991 | Jean Denton | Baroness Denton of Wakefield | of Wakefield in the County of West Yorkshire | | 5 February 2001 |
| 16 | 14 June 1991 | Jennifer Hilton | Baroness Hilton of Eggardon | of Eggardon in the County of Dorset | 5 November 2021 | |
| 17 | 19 June 1991 | Ann Mallalieu | Baroness Mallalieu | of Studdridge in the County of Buckinghamshire | | |
| 18 | 20 June 1991 | Clive Hollick | Baron Hollick | of Notting Hill in the Royal Borough of Kensington and Chelsea | | |
| 19 | 21 June 1991 | Detta O'Cathain | Baroness O'Cathain | of The Barbican in the City of London | | 23 April 2021 |
| 20 | 24 June 1991 | Colin Renfrew | Baron Renfrew of Kaimsthorn | of Hurlet in the District of Renfrew | 15 September 2021 | 24 November 2024 |
| 21 | 26 June 1991 | John MacKay ‡ | Baron Mackay of Ardbrecknish | of Tayvallich in the District of Argyll and Bute | | 21 February 2001 |
| 22 | 15 July 1991 | Robert Skidelsky | Baron Skidelsky | of Tilton in the County of East Sussex | | 15 April 2026 |
| 23 | 16 July 1991 | Pauline Perry | Baroness Perry of Southwark | of Charlbury in the County of Oxfordshire | 26 May 2016 | |
| 24 | 17 July 1991 | Leonard Cheshire | Baron Cheshire | of Woodhall in the County of Lincolnshire | | 31 July 1992 |
| 25 | 29 July 1991 | Norman Macfarlane | Baron Macfarlane of Bearsden | of Bearsden in the District of Bearsden and Milngavie | 21 July 2016 | 5 November 2021 |
| 26 | 30 July 1991 | David Craig | Baron Craig of Radley | of Helhoughton in the County of Norfolk | | |
| 27 | 27 January 1992 | Brian Rix | Baron Rix | of Whitehall in the City of Westminster and of Hornsea in Yorkshire | | 20 August 2016 |
| 28 | 30 January 1992 | Reg Prentice ‡ | Baron Prentice | of Daventry in the County of Northamptonshire | | 18 January 2001 |
| 29 | 12 February 1992 | Bill Rodgers ‡ | Baron Rodgers of Quarry Bank | of Kentish Town in the London Borough of Camden | 12 December 2023 | |
| 30 | 14 February 1992 | David Wilson | Baron Wilson of Tillyorn | of Finzean in the District of Kincardine and Deeside and of Fanling in Hong Kong | 12 February 2021 | |
| 31 | 24 April 1992 | John Wakeham ‡ | Baron Wakeham | of Maldon in the County of Essex | | |
| 32 | 24 April 1992 | Lynda Chalker ‡ | Baroness Chalker of Wallasey | of Leigh-on-Sea in the County of Essex | 3 February 2023 | |
| 33 | 27 April 1992 | Peter Taylor | Baron Taylor of Gosforth | of Embleton in the County of Northumberland | | 28 April 1997 |
| 34 | 29 April 1992 | Alan Rodger | Baron Rodger of Earlsferry | of Earlsferry in the District of North East Fife | | 26 June 2011 |
| 35 | 26 June 1992 | Margaret Thatcher ‡ | Baroness Thatcher | of Kesteven in the County of Lincolnshire | | 8 April 2013 |
| 36 | 27 June 1992 | Geoffrey Finsberg ‡ | Baron Finsberg | of Hampstead in the London Borough of Camden | | 7 October 1996 |
| 37 | 29 June 1992 | Cecil Parkinson ‡ | Baron Parkinson | of Carnforth in the County of Lancashire | 14 September 2015 | 22 January 2016 |
| 38 | 29 June 1992 | Denis Healey ‡ | Baron Healey | of Riddlesden in the County of West Yorkshire | | 3 October 2015 |
| 39 | 30 June 1992 | David Owen ‡ | Baron Owen | of the City of Plymouth | 13 August 2024 | |
| 40 | 30 June 1992 | Geoffrey Howe ‡ | Baron Howe of Aberavon | of Tandridge in the County of Surrey | 19 May 2015 | 9 October 2015 |
| 41 | 1 July 1992 | Nigel Lawson ‡ | Baron Lawson of Blaby | of Newnham in the County of Northamptonshire | 31 December 2022 | 3 April 2023 |
| 42 | 1 July 1992 | Merlyn Rees ‡ | Baron Merlyn-Rees | of Morley and South Leeds in the County of West Yorkshire and of Cilfynydd in the County of Mid Glamorgan | | 5 January 2006 |
| 43 | 2 July 1992 | Denis Howell ‡ | Baron Howell | of Aston Manor in the City of Birmingham | | 19 April 1998 |
| 44 | 3 July 1992 | John Moore ‡ | Baron Moore of Lower Marsh | of Lower Marsh in the London Borough of Lambeth | | 20 May 2019 |
| 45 | 6 July 1992 | Norman Tebbit ‡ | Baron Tebbit | of Chingford in the London Borough of Waltham Forest | 31 March 2022 | 7 July 2025 |
| 46 | 7 July 1992 | George Younger ‡ (Note: Succeeded as 4th Viscount Younger of Leckie in 1997.) | Baron Younger of Prestwick | of Ayr in the District of Kyle and Carrick | | 26 January 2003 |
| 47 | 7 July 1992 | Julian Amery ‡ | Baron Amery of Lustleigh | of Preston in the County of Lancashire and of Brighton in the County of East Sussex | | 3 September 1996 |
| 48 | 7 July 1992 | Peter Walker ‡ | Baron Walker of Worcester | of Abbots Morton in the County of Hereford and Worcester | | 23 June 2010 |
| 49 | 9 July 1992 | Peter Archer ‡ | Baron Archer of Sandwell | of Sandwell in the County of West Midlands | | 14 June 2012 |
| 50 | 10 July 1992 | Jack Ashley ‡ | Baron Ashley of Stoke | of Widnes in the County of Cheshire | | 20 April 2012 |
| 51 | 14 July 1992 | John Eatwell | Baron Eatwell | of Stratton St Margaret in the County of Wiltshire | | |
| 52 | 15 July 1992 | Bernard Weatherill ‡ | Baron Weatherill | of North East Croydon in the London Borough of Croydon | | 6 May 2007 |
| 53 | 17 July 1992 | Harry Ewing ‡ | Baron Ewing of Kirkford | of Cowdenbeath in the District of Dunfermline | | 9 June 2007 |
| 54 | 18 July 1992 | Geraint Howells ‡ | Baron Geraint | of Ponterwyd in the County of Dyfed | | 17 April 2004 |
| 55 | 20 July 1992 | Ian Stewart ‡ | Baron Stewartby | of Portmoak in the District of Perth and Kinross | 12 November 2015 | 3 March 2018 |
| 56 | 21 July 1992 | William Clark ‡ | Baron Clark of Kempston | of Kempston in the County of Bedfordshire | | 4 October 2004 |
| 57 | 24 July 1992 | Raymond Plant | Baron Plant of Highfield | of Weelsby in the County of Humberside | 28 February 2024 | |
| 58 | 27 July 1992 | Jeffrey Archer ‡ | Baron Archer of Weston-super-Mare | of Mark in the County of Somerset | 4 July 2024 | 5 October 2026 |
| 59 | 28 July 1992 | Nicholas Ridley ‡ | Baron Ridley of Liddesdale | of Willimontswick in the County of Northumberland | | 4 March 1993 |
| 60 | 29 July 1992 | Margaret Jay | Baroness Jay of Paddington | of Paddington in the City of Westminster | | |
| 61 | 30 July 1992 | Gareth Williams | Baron Williams of Mostyn | of Great Tew in the County of Oxfordshire | | 20 September 2003 |
| 62 | 10 August 1992 | Bernard Braine ‡ | Baron Braine of Wheatley | of Rayleigh in the County of Essex | | 5 January 2000 |
| 63 | 11 August 1992 | Alec Cooke | Baron Cooke of Islandreagh | of Islandreagh in the County of Antrim | | 13 November 2007 |
| 64 | 12 August 1992 | Derek Barber | Baron Barber of Tewkesbury | of Gotherington in the County of Gloucestershire | 25 March 2016 | 21 November 2017 |
| 65 | 21 August 1992 | Barney Hayhoe ‡ | Baron Hayhoe | of Isleworth in the London Borough of Hounslow | | 7 September 2013 |
| 66 | 25 August 1992 | Sir Ian Gilmour, Bt. ‡ | Baron Gilmour of Craigmillar | of Craigmillar in the District of the City of Edinburgh | | 21 September 2007 |
| 67 | 18 September 1992 | Dafydd Elis-Thomas ‡ | Baron Elis-Thomas | of Nant Conwy in the County of Gwynedd | | 7 February 2025 |
| 68 | 1 February 1993 | Shirley Williams ‡ | Baroness Williams of Crosby | of Stevenage in the County of Hertfordshire | 11 February 2016 | 12 April 2021 |
| 69 | 14 July 1993 | Robin Leigh-Pemberton | Baron Kingsdown | of Pemberton in the County of Lancashire | | 24 November 2013 |
| 70 | 15 July 1993 | Ralf Dahrendorf | Baron Dahrendorf | of Clare Market in the City of Westminster | | 17 June 2009 |
| 71 | 19 July 1993 | Yehudi Menuhin | Baron Menuhin | of Stoke d'Abernon in the County of Surrey | | 12 March 1999 |
| 72 | 30 July 1993 | Richard Attenborough | Baron Attenborough | of Richmond upon Thames in the London Borough of Richmond upon Thames | | 24 August 2014 |
| 73 | 4 October 1993 | Simon Haskel | Baron Haskel | of Higher Broughton in the County of Greater Manchester | 21 May 2026 | |
| 74 | 5 October 1993 | Paul Dean ‡ | Baron Dean of Harptree | of Wedmore in the County of Somerset | | 1 April 2009 |
| 75 | 6 October 1993 | Joyce Gould | Baroness Gould of Potternewton | of Leeds in the County of West Yorkshire | 22 July 2019 | |
| 76 | 11 October 1993 | Robert Dixon-Smith | Baron Dixon-Smith | of Bocking in the County of Essex | 7 November 2023 | |
| 77 | 12 October 1993 | Brenda Dean | Baroness Dean of Thornton-le-Fylde | of Eccles in the County of Greater Manchester | | 13 March 2018 |
| 78 | 13 October 1993 | Anthony Lester | Baron Lester of Herne Hill | of Herne Hill in the London Borough of Southwark | 12 December 2018 | 7 August 2020 |
| 79 | 14 October 1993 | Doreen Miller | Baroness Miller of Hendon | of Gore in the London Borough of Barnet | | 21 June 2014 |
| 80 | 15 October 1993 | Christopher Tugendhat ‡ | Baron Tugendhat | of Widdington in the County of Essex | | |
| 81 | 10 February 1994 | Patrick Wright | Baron Wright of Richmond | of Richmond upon Thames in the London Borough of Richmond upon Thames | 17 December 2019 | 6 March 2020 |
| 82 | 22 March 1994 | David Nickson | Baron Nickson | of Renagour in the District of Stirling | 27 March 2015 | |
| 83 | 12 July 1994 | Randolph Quirk | Baron Quirk | of Bloomsbury in the London Borough of Camden | | 20 December 2017 |
| 84 | 14 July 1994 | David Chilton Phillips | Baron Phillips of Ellesmere | of Ellesmere in the County of Shropshire | | 23 February 1999 |
| 85 | 6 September 1994 | Allen Sheppard | Baron Sheppard of Didgemere | of Roydon in the County of Essex | | 25 March 2015 |
| 86 | 26 September 1994 | Charles Hambro | Baron Hambro | of Dixton and Dumbleton in the County of Gloucestershire | | 7 November 2002 |
| 87 | 27 September 1994 | Alf Dubs ‡ | Baron Dubs | of Battersea in the London Borough of Wandsworth | | |
| 88 | 28 September 1994 | Derek Gladwin | Baron Gladwin of Clee | of Great Grimsby in the County of Humberside | | 10 April 2003 |
| 89 | 29 September 1994 | Josie Farrington | Baroness Farrington of Ribbleton | of Fulwood in the County of Lancashire | | 30 March 2018 |
| 90 | 30 September 1994 | Michael Shaw ‡ # | Baron Shaw of Northstead | of Liversedge in the County of West Yorkshire | 31 March 2015 | 8 January 2021 |
| 91 | 4 October 1994 | Graham Tope ‡ | Baron Tope | of Sutton in the London Borough of Sutton | | |
| 92 | 5 October 1994 | Patricia Rawlings # | Baroness Rawlings | of Burnham Westgate in the County of Norfolk | | |
| 93 | 6 October 1994 | Susan Thomas | Baroness Thomas of Walliswood | of Dorking in the County of Surrey | 18 May 2016 | 6 October 2023 |
| 94 | 7 October 1994 | Christopher Prout # | Baron Kingsland | of Shrewsbury in the County of Shropshire | | 12 July 2009 |
| 95 | 10 October 1994 | Peter Blaker ‡ | Baron Blaker | of Blackpool in the County of Lancashire and of Lindfield in the County of West Sussex | | 5 July 2009 |
| 96 | 3 February 1995 | Sarah Hogg | Baroness Hogg | of Kettlethorpe in the County of Lincolnshire | | |
| 97 | 10 February 1995 | Brian McConnell | Baron McConnell | of Lisburn in the County of Antrim | | 25 October 2000 |
| 98 | 17 February 1995 | Elizabeth Smith | Baroness Smith of Gilmorehill | of Gilmorehill in the District of the City of Glasgow | 28 February 2025 | |
| 99 | 28 February 1995 | David Hope, Lord Hope (Note: In remainder to the Earldom of Hopetoun (Scotland).) | Baron Hope of Craighead | of Bamff in the District of Perth and Kinross | | |
| 100 | 24 July 1995 | James Blyth | Baron Blyth of Rowington | of Rowington in the County of Warwickshire | 1 January 2018 | |
| 101 | 25 July 1995 | John Cuckney | Baron Cuckney | of Millbank in the City of Westminster | | 30 October 2008 |
| 102 | 25 August 1995 | Robin Eames | Baron Eames | of Armagh in the County of Armagh | | |
| 103 | 7 September 1995 | John Habgood | Baron Habgood | of Calverton in the County of Buckinghamshire | 3 October 2011 | 6 March 2019 |
| 104 | 13 December 1995 | Donald Mackay | Baron Mackay of Drumadoon | of Blackwaterfoot in the District of Cunninghame | 17 January 2017 | 21 August 2018 |
| 105 | 18 December 1995 | Robert Winston | Baron Winston | of Hammersmith in the London Borough of Hammersmith and Fulham | | |
| 106 | 19 December 1995 | William Wallace | Baron Wallace of Saltaire | of Shipley in the County of West Yorkshire | | |
| 107 | 20 December 1995 | Tom McNally ‡ | Baron McNally | of Blackpool in the County of Lancashire | | |
| 108 | 21 December 1995 | Gordon Borrie | Baron Borrie | of Abbots Morton in the County of Hereford and Worcester | | 30 September 2016 |
| 109 | 2 January 1996 | Helene Hayman ‡ | Baroness Hayman | of Dartmouth Park in the London Borough of Camden | | |
| 110 | 10 January 1996 | John Sewel | Baron Sewel | of Gilcomstoun in the District of the City of Aberdeen | 30 July 2015 | |
| 111 | 11 January 1996 | Philip Harris | Baron Harris of Peckham | of Peckham in the London Borough of Southwark | | |
| 112 | 12 January 1996 | Peter Pilkington | Baron Pilkington of Oxenford | of West Dowlish in the County of Somerset | | 14 February 2011 |
| 113 | 15 January 1996 | Basil Feldman | Baron Feldman | of Frognal in the London Borough of Camden | 30 June 2017 | 19 July 2019 |
| 114 | 16 January 1996 | Judith Wilcox | Baroness Wilcox | of Plymouth in the County of Devon | 17 December 2020 | |
| 115 | 17 January 1996 | Peter Bowness | Baron Bowness | of Warlingham in the County of Surrey and of Croydon in the London Borough of Croydon | | |
| 116 | 5 February 1996 | Dick Taverne ‡ # | Baron Taverne | of Pimlico in the City of Westminster | 7 March 2025 | 25 October 2025 |
| 117 | 16 February 1996 | Robert Kilpatrick | Baron Kilpatrick of Kincraig | of Dysart in the District of Kirkcaldy | | 16 September 2015 |
| 118 | 21 February 1996 | David Gillmore | Baron Gillmore of Thamesfield | of Putney in the London Borough of Wandsworth | | 20 March 1999 |
| 119 | 3 April 1996 | Robin Cooke | Baron Cooke of Thorndon | of Wellington in New Zealand and of Cambridge in the County of Cambridgeshire | | 30 August 2006 |
| 120 | 4 June 1996 | Tom Bingham | Baron Bingham of Cornhill | of Boughrood in the County of Powys | | 11 September 2010 |
| 121 | 19 August 1996 | June Lloyd | Baroness Lloyd of Highbury | of Highbury in the London Borough of Islington | | 28 June 2006 |
| 122 | 3 September 1996 | Richard Vincent | Baron Vincent of Coleshill | of Shrivenham in the County of Oxfordshire | 9 March 2016 | 7 September 2018 |
| 123 | 11 September 1996 | Marmaduke Hussey | Baron Hussey of North Bradley | of North Bradley in the County of Wiltshire | | 27 December 2006 |
| 124 | 30 September 1996 | Martin Thomas | Baron Thomas of Gresford | of Gresford in the County Borough of Wrexham | | |
| 125 | 1 October 1996 | David Currie | Baron Currie of Marylebone | of Marylebone in the City of Westminster | | |
| 126 | 2 October 1996 | John Taylor | Baron Taylor of Warwick | of Warwick in the County of Warwickshire | | |
| 127 | 4 October 1996 | Maurice Saatchi | Baron Saatchi | of Staplefield in the County of West Sussex | | |
| 128 | 7 October 1996 | Elizabeth Symons | Baroness Symons of Vernham Dean | of Vernham Dean in the County of Hampshire | | |
| 129 | 7 October 1996 | John Alderdice | Baron Alderdice | of Knock in the City of Belfast | | |
| 130 | 9 October 1996 | Swraj Paul | Baron Paul | of Marylebone in the City of Westminster | | 21 August 2025 |
| 131 | 11 October 1996 | Meta Ramsay | Baroness Ramsay of Cartvale | of Langside in the City of Glasgow | | 28 May 2026 |
| 132 | 14 October 1996 | Joyce Anelay | Baroness Anelay of St Johns | of St Johns in the County of Surrey | | |
| 133 | 15 October 1996 | Hazel Byford | Baroness Byford | of Rothley in the County of Leicestershire | 5 May 2020 | |
| 134 | 16 October 1996 | Peter Gummer | Baron Chadlington | of Dean in the County of Oxfordshire | 7 March 2026 | |
| 135 | 17 October 1996 | Richard Rogers | Baron Rogers of Riverside | of Chelsea in the Royal Borough of Kensington and Chelsea | 11 May 2021 | 18 December 2021 |
| 136 | 18 October 1996 | Ian MacLaurin | Baron MacLaurin of Knebworth | of Knebworth in the County of Hertfordshire | 22 December 2017 | |
| 137 | 21 October 1996 | Larry Whitty | Baron Whitty | of Camberwell in the London Borough of Southwark | | |
| 138 | 14 February 1997 | Raj Bagri | Baron Bagri | of Regent's Park in the City of Westminster | 6 July 2010 | 26 April 2017 |
| 139 | 17 February 1997 | Audrey Emerton | Baroness Emerton | of Tunbridge Wells in the County of Kent and of Clerkenwell in the London Borough of Islington | 1 November 2019 | 27 February 2026 |
| 140 | 18 February 1997 | Andrew Lloyd Webber | Baron Lloyd-Webber | of Sydmonton in the County of Hampshire | 17 October 2017 | |

‡ former MP
# former MEP

== See also ==
- List of life peerages (complete list of life peerages granted since 1958)
- List of hereditary peers in the House of Lords by virtue of a life peerage
