= Susan Thomas, Baroness Thomas of Walliswood =

British politician (1935–2023)

The Right Honourable The Baroness Thomas of Walliswood OBE DL

Member of the House of Lords
- Lord Temporal
- Life peerage 6 October 1994 – 18 May 2016

Personal details
- Born: Susan Petronella Arrow; 20 December 1935
- Died: 6 October 2023 (aged 87)
- Party: Liberal Democrat
- Spouse: David Churchill Thomas (m. 1958)
- Children: 3, including Diana
- Education: Cranborne Chase School; Lady Margaret Hall, Oxford (BA)

Susan Petronella Thomas, Baroness Thomas of Walliswood, OBE, DL (20 December 1935 – 6 October 2023) was a British businesswoman and Liberal Democrat politician.

== Early life and education ==
Thomas was the daughter of John Arrow and Ebba Fordham. She was educated at Cranborne Chase School and Lady Margaret Hall, Oxford, where she graduated with a Bachelor of Arts in history in 1957.

== Career ==
Thomas worked for the National Economic Development Office from 1971 to 1974 and was chief executive of the Council of Europe of the British Clothing Industries from 1974 to 1978. Between 1985 and 1994, she was a school governor.

Thomas contested Mole Valley for the SDP-Liberal Alliance in the 1983 and 1987 general elections, finishing second of three candidates on both occasions, and receiving 14,973 votes (30.7%) and 15,613 votes (29.9%) respectively. She also stood in Surrey for the Liberal Democrats in the 1994 European Parliament election, but failed to be elected.

== Personal life and death ==
In 1958, she had married David Churchill Thomas. They have three daughters, including the author Tom Cain.

Baroness Thomas died on 6 October 2023, at the age of 87.

== Honours ==
In the 1989 Birthday Honours, Thomas was appointed an Officer of the Order of the British Empire (OBE) "for political service". Thomas was appointed in January 1996 a Deputy Lieutenant of Surrey.

On 6 October 1994, she was created a life peer as Baroness Thomas of Walliswood, of Dorking in the County of Surrey. She sat in the House of Lords until 18 May 2016, at which point she ceased to be a member pursuant to section 2 of the House of Lords Reform Act 2014, having failed to attend during the whole of the 2015–16 session without being on leave of absence.
