= Amir Bhatia, Baron Bhatia =

British businessman and life peer (1932–2024)

The Right Honourable The Lord Bhatia OBE
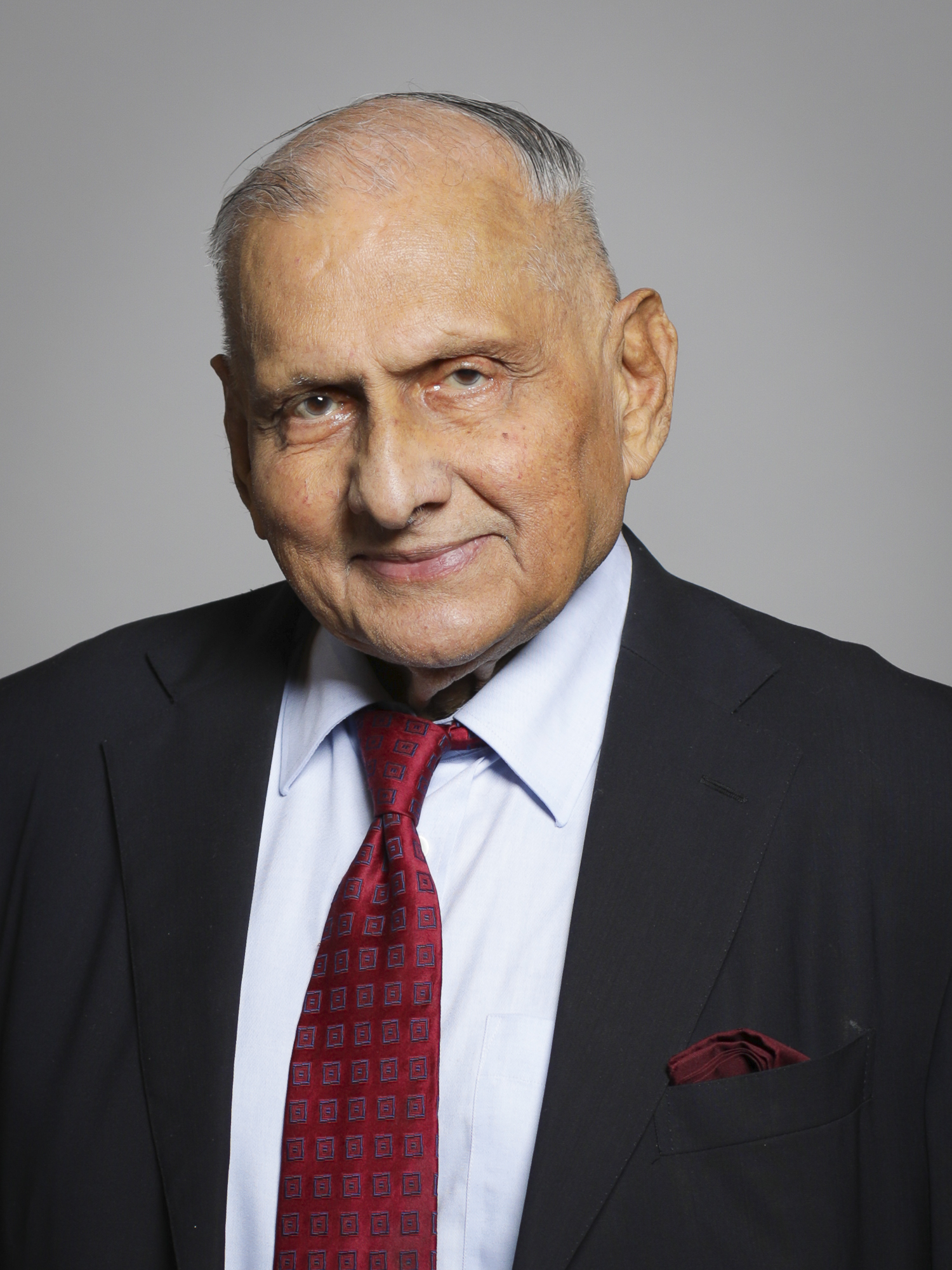
- Official portrait, 2019

Member of the House of Lords
- Lord Temporal
- Life peerage 5 June 2001 – 7 November 2023

Personal details
- Born: Amirali Alibhai Bhatia; 18 March 1932 Tanganyika Territory
- Died: 12 January 2024 (aged 91)
- Party: Non-affiliated
- Other political affiliations: Crossbench (until 2010)

Amirali Alibhai Bhatia, Baron Bhatia, OBE (18 March 1932 – 12 January 2024) was a British businessman and life peer.

== Background ==
An Ismaili Muslim born in East Africa, Bhatia was educated at The Scindia School and passed out in 1948. He was married to Nurbanu Amersi and had three daughters. He moved to the United Kingdom in 1972. Lord Bhatia died on 12 January 2024, at the age of 91.

== Career ==
Bhatia was chairman and managing director of Forbes Campbell International Ltd. between 1980 and 2001. He was the co-founder of the Ethnic Minority Foundation and its chair until 2009, and also helped establish the Council of Ethnic Minority Voluntary Sector Organisations (CEMVO). He was additionally a former trustee of various charitable organisations, including the National Lottery Charities Board and Oxfam, serving as chairman of Oxfam Trading.

In 2006 he was the chair of the British Edutrust foundation, the organisation planning to sponsor Rhodesway School. He stepped down from the post in March 2009.

== Honours ==
Bhatia was appointed an Officer of the Order of the British Empire (OBE) in the 1997 Birthday Honours. On 5 June 2001, he was created a life peer as Baron Bhatia, of Hampton in the London Borough of Richmond upon Thames, one of the first 'people's peers'. He took his seat in the House of Lords as a crossbencher.

In 2003 Lord Bhatia received the Beacon Fellowship Prize for his leadership role in countering social deprivation and exclusion in the UK and internationally.

== Controversy ==
In October 2010, Lord Bhatia was suspended from the House of Lords for eight months due to the United Kingdom parliamentary expenses scandal. After that, he sat in the Lords as a non-affiliated member.

In December 2013, BBC Newsnight reported that Lord Bhatia had been accused by the Ethnic Minority Foundation of misappropriating £600,000 from the charity. Lord Bhatia was suing the charity for unfair dismissal, and his lawyers said that the allegations were confusing the historical position with the present dispute.
