= Another place (disambiguation) =

Another place is a euphemism used in many bicameral parliaments using the Westminster system.

Another place may also refer to:

- Another Place (sculpture), a piece of modern sculpture by Sir Antony Gormley
- Another Place (Hiroshima album), 1985, or the title track
- Another Place (Rick Price album), 1999
- Another Place (Bunky Green album), 2006
- Another Place, a 1978 album by American jazz musician Fred Anderson
- "Another Place" (song), a song by Bastille and Alessia Cara

== See also ==
- Another Time, Another Place (disambiguation)
- Another Place, Another Time (disambiguation)
- The Other Place (disambiguation)
