= Another Time =

Another Time may refer to:

- Another Time (book), a 1940 book of poems by W. H. Auden
- Another Time (Jeff Williams album), 2011
- Another Time (Earth, Wind & Fire album), 1974

== See also ==
- "Another Time (Andrew's Song)", a 2014 song by Annaleigh Ashford and Will Van Dyke
- Another Time, Another Place (disambiguation)
- Another Place, Another Time (disambiguation)
