= House of Lords (Expulsion and Suspension) Act 2015 =

Act of the Parliament of the United Kingdom

House of Lords (Expulsion and Suspension) Act 2015 (Note: Section 4(1).)
- Act of Parliament
- Parliament of the United Kingdom
- Long title: An Act to make provision empowering the House of Lords to expel or suspend members.
- Citation: 2015 c. 14
- Introduced by: Sir George Young (Commons); Helene Valerie Hayman, Baroness Hayman (Lords)
- Territorial extent: United Kingdom (Note: Section 4(3).)

Dates
- Royal assent: 26 March 2015
- Commencement: 26 June 2015 (Note: Section 4(2).)
Other legislation
Amends	House of Lords Reform Act 2014

Status: Current legislation

Text of statute as originally enacted

Revised text of statute as amended

The House of Lords (Expulsion and Suspension) Act 2015 (c. 14) is an act of the Parliament of the United Kingdom which authorised the House of Lords to expel a member, or to suspend a member for a definite period of time. This power may only be exercised for conduct which either was committed or became public knowledge after the act comes into force. A member who is expelled is disqualified from becoming a member again.

This act arose from a private member's bill sponsored by Baroness Hayman and Sir George Young.

== Background ==
Historically the House of Lords had no power to expel a member from the House, even if they had committed a criminal offence or been imprisoned. An example of this was when Lord Black of Crossharbour was imprisoned for three years and was placed on a leave of absence from the House but only had to give three months notice in order to return. The strongest sanction the House of Lords could issue against a peer was a suspension for the rest of the Parliamentary session.

In 2009, the Committee for Privileges and Conduct issued a report suggesting that the House be granted the power to expel members. The resulting House of Lords Reform Act 2014 allowed for expulsions to be made on grounds of non-attendance or serious criminal conviction. However it was felt these powers were insufficient. The House of Lords (Expulsion and Suspension) Bill was first introduced to Parliament as a Private Members Bill by Baroness Hayman in the House of Lords before progressing to the House of Commons where it was sponsored by Sir George Young. It received Royal Assent from Queen Elizabeth II on 26 March 2015.

== Effect ==
The act granted the House of Lords the power to amend their Standing Orders to allow for peers to be expelled for breaching the House of Lords code of conduct. Any peer ejected in this manner would still be entitled to keep their title. The act was cited by Lord Speaker Baroness D'Souza as evidence for the House of Lords reforming. Under section 4 of the House of Lords Reform Act 2014, a life peer who is expelled from the Lords can accordingly be elected as, or vote for, an MP, though no such peer has been elected to the House of Commons.

It was speculated that the power would first be used after Lord Sewel was filmed allegedly taking cocaine, however Lord Sewel resigned in July 2015 before the investigation could take place. The first peer recommended for expulsion by the Lords Conduct Committee was Lord Ahmed in November 2020, who subsequently resigned from the Lords as well.

== See also ==
- Reform of the House of Lords (details reform proposals put forward since 1997)
- History of reform of the House of Lords (details reforms enacted since the 16th century)
- House of Lords Reform Act 2014 (whose provisions were amended by the 2015 Act)
