= History of reform of the House of Lords =

Since 1997, whenever the Labour Party formed the United Kingdom government, the government has been engaged in efforts to reform the House of Lords, the upper house of the Parliament of the United Kingdom. The history of reform by all parties before 1997, is set out in sections below about reforms of composition and powers carried out in the past and of unsuccessful proposals and attempts at reform in the twentieth century. Proposals include decreasing the number of lords, introducing a system where lords are democratically elected, or abolition of the House of Lords in favour of a unicameral Parliament.

== Reforms of composition ==
The House of Lords is composed of two major groups: the Lords Spiritual (who in modern times are the archbishops and some of the bishops of the Church of England) and the Lords Temporal (who are the peers who are members of the House of Lords). Although the basic distinction has existed since the origin of the House, the composition of both groups has changed over the centuries.

Formerly, a second way of dividing members of the House of Lords was geographical. Before the Acts of Union, 1707 unified England and Scotland (abolishing the unicameral Parliament of Scotland), the Lords Temporal were all members of the Peerage of England (which for this purpose included Wales). All holders of those titles (who were not disqualified for some reason) continued to have seats until the reforms of composition after 1997. For the representation of other geographical peerages see below.

From the Reformation until 1801 the Lords Spiritual were all members of the Church of England, the Anglican church which operated in England and Wales in that period. For the changes in the geographical areas covered by the Lords Spiritual see below.

=== Removal of the abbots and priors, 1539–40 ===
Powell and Wallis in The House of Lords in the Middle Ages discuss the disappearance of the abbots and priors, who had been amongst the Lords Spiritual previously summoned to Parliament, when a new Parliament met on 28 April 1539.

Six of the abbeys whose heads were on the standard list of summonses to parliament – Abingdon, Battle, Hyde, St Augustine's Canterbury, Shrewsbury and Bardney – had voluntarily surrendered to the vicar-general, Cromwell, in the course of 1538, Coventry had followed in January 1539, and Tavistock on 3 March, two days after the issue of the parliamentary writs. The abbot of Burton, whose house was not surrendered until November, does not appear on the journal lists; but he had also been omitted from all but the first six days of the preceding parliament. The prior of the Hospital is also omitted from the journal lists of attendances for this parliament though his house and order were not dissolved until May 1540.

... Parliament proceeded to confirm the title of the king and his heirs to the possession of recently dissolved monastic houses, by an act stating that "divers and sundry abbots, priors, abbesses, prioresses ... of their own free and voluntary minds, good wills and assents" have surrendered their foundations. Six months later the last three abbots to resist the king's will – Reading, Glastonbury and Colchester – were hanged. When the parliament resumed after prorogation in April 1540, the abbots were all gone, the last, Robert Fuller of Waltham, having surrendered the previous month and retired on a pension of £200 a year.

=== Removal of the Lords Spiritual, 1642 ===
The right of the Lords Spiritual to sit in the House of Lords was removed during the Long Parliament under the Clergy Act 1640 (passed in 1642). As this legislation had passed both Houses and received royal assent, the Royalists accepted it was a valid law. After the restoration of the monarch in 1660 the Lords Spiritual were readmitted to membership of the House of Lords when the Clergy Act 1661 was passed.

=== Abolition of the House of Lords, 1649 ===
On 19 March 1649 the House of Commons abolished the House of Lords. This revolutionary action did not obtain the consent of either Lords or the King and so it was not recognised as a valid law after the restoration of the King.

The first part of the abolishing Act was as follows.

The Commons of England assembled in Parliament, finding by too long experience that the House of Lords is useless and dangerous to the people of England to be continued, have thought fit to ordain and enact, and be it ordained and enacted by this present Parliament, and by the authority of the same, that from henceforth the House of Lords in Parliament shall be and is hereby wholly abolished and taken away; and that the Lords shall not from henceforth meet or sit in the said House called the Lords' House, or in any other house or place whatsoever ...

=== Re-establishment of the House of Lords, 1660 ===
The Lords Temporal resumed meeting as the House of Lords, in the Convention Parliament which restored the monarchy.

=== Re-admission of the Lords Spiritual, 1661 ===
The Clergy Act 1661 permitted the prelates of the Church of England to resume sitting as members of the House of Lords.

=== Representation of the peerages of Scotland and Great Britain from 1707 ===
Under the Treaty of Union and subsequent legislation, the Kingdoms of England and Scotland were merged into the United Kingdom of Great Britain. From 1707 no further Peers of England or of Scotland were created. New titles were created in the Peerage of Great Britain and these conferred seats in the House of Lords.

The Peerage of Scotland were not all given seats in the House of Lords. Instead they were allowed to elect representative peers to each parliament. See List of Scottish representative peers.

Article XXII of the Treaty of Union provides:

Of the Peers of Scotland at the time of the Union Sixteen shall be the number to Sit and Vote in the House of Lords ... And when Her Majesty Her Heirs or Successors, shall Declare Her or their pleasure for holding the first or any subsequent Parliament of Great Britain until the Parliament of Great Britain shall make further provision therein, A Writ do issue under the Great Seal of the United Kingdom, Directed to the Privy Council of Scotland, Commanding them to Cause Sixteen Peers, who are to sit in the House of Lords to be Summoned to Parliament ... in such manner as by a subsequent Act of this present session of the Parliament of Scotland shall be settled ...

The Church of Scotland was not given any representation in the House of Lords, so the existing Lords Spiritual were unaffected by the Union.

=== Representation of the peerages of Ireland and the UK from 1801 ===
Under the Act of Union 1800 the Kingdoms of Great Britain and Ireland were merged to form the United Kingdom of Great Britain and Ireland from 1 January 1801. No further peers of Great Britain were created, although the power to create new Irish peerages in certain circumstances was retained and exercised in the nineteenth century.

New titles created in the Peerage of the United Kingdom conferred a seat in the House of Lords. The Peerage of Ireland was represented in the House of Lords by twenty eight representative peers, elected for life. See List of Irish representative peers.

=== Representation of the Church of Ireland from 1801 ===
The Anglican church in Ireland, the Church of Ireland, was the established church of the country at the time of the Union. The Archbishops and Bishops of that church were given representation in the House of Lords.

Under the provisions of the Act of Union 1800, one archbishop and the three bishops chosen by rotation (changing for each session of Parliament) would be Lords Spiritual in the newly united United Kingdom House of Lords in Westminster, joining the two archbishops (Canterbury and York) and the twenty-four bishops from the Church of England.

=== Exclusion of life peers by prerogative, 1856 ===
In 1856 an attempt was made to use the royal prerogative to create a life peer. This was a revival of a royal power unused (for male recipients) since the reign of King Richard II of England. In the Wensleydale Peerage Case (see Peerage law) the House of Lords decided that peers created for life were not entitled to a seat in the House.

=== Removal of the Irish Lords Spiritual, 1871 ===
Though the religion of a minority of Irish people at the time, the Church of Ireland remained the official, established religion of Ireland, until its disestablishment by the Irish Church Act 1869 came into effect in 1871. The representation of the Church in the House of Lords also ceased.

=== Admission of the Law Lords, 1876 ===
Eminent lawyers were appointed as Lords of Appeal in Ordinary from 1876. Originally they held seats in the House of Lords only until they retired as law lords (similarly to the practice for Bishops), but in 1887 the seats were conferred for life. See List of law life peerages.

=== Removal of the Welsh Lords Spiritual, 1920 ===
The Church of England was disestablished in Wales with the Welsh Church Act 1914 (with implementation delayed until 1920 due to the war). The bishops of the new Church in Wales ceased to be eligible to become Lords Spiritual in Parliament.

=== Removal of the representative peers of Ireland, 1922–1961 ===
Peers in the Peerage of Ireland elected representative peers for life from the Union of 1801 until the Irish Free State became an independent Dominion in 1922. The last Irish representative peer died in 1961.

=== Admission of life peers by statute, 1958 ===
From 1958 life peers, in the degree of Baron or Baroness, were created. For the first time women became eligible to sit in the House of Lords. Since 1964 almost all peerages have been created in this category.

=== Peerage Act 1963 ===
The Peerage Act 1963 had three significant yet distinct effects on the House of Lords; introducing the right of hereditary peers to renounce an inherited title, allowing female hereditary peers to take a seat in Parliament for the first time, and withdrawing the restrictions on the number of Scottish peers that could sit in the House of Lords.

=== Commonwealth of Britain Bill, 1991 ===
A bill was introduced in the House of Commons by Tony Benn in 1991 called the Commonwealth of Britain Bill, which proposed reforms including replacement of the House of Lords by an elected House of the People, with equal representation of men and women. The Bill did not achieve a second reading. Later in life Tony Benn advocated for the abolition, rather than reform, of the House of Lords.

=== House of Lords Act 1999 ===
The House of Lords Act 1999 withdrew the automatic right of hereditary peers to sit in the House of Lords as the first stage of a planned reform by the Labour government of Tony Blair. However 92 hereditary peers were allowed to remain pending completion of the second stage of the proposed reforms.

=== House of Lords Reform Act 2014 ===
The House of Lords Reform Act 2014 allowed members to resign from the House; previously there had been no mechanism for this. It also provided for the exclusion of any peer sentenced to a term of imprisonment of one year or more for a criminal offence, as well as a mechanism for removal of peers for non-attendance.

=== House of Lords (Expulsion and Suspension) Act 2015 ===
The House of Lords (Expulsion and Suspension) Act 2015 authorised the House to expel or suspend members.

== Reforms of powers ==
Originally the two Houses of Parliament had equal legislative powers. The agreement of both was necessary before a Bill could be submitted to the Monarch for royal assent, which if granted made the Bill an Act of Parliament. After the English Restoration a constitutional convention arose that the House of Lords would defer to the House of Commons on measures to raise and spend money. This did not affect the legal powers of the House of Lords. After the split in the Liberal Party over the First Irish Home Rule Bill in 1886, most Whig aristocrats left the Gladstonian Liberal party and became Liberal Unionists. The effect was to reinforce an already large Conservative majority in the House of Lords.

Liberal governments in the late nineteenth and early twentieth century had difficulty in getting major legislation through the upper house. On issues as central to the politics of the day as Home Rule and as dear to the hearts of radicals as the end of plural voting, the Lords were implacably opposed.

=== Parliament Act 1911 ===
When in 1909, the House of Lords rejected the Finance Bill (giving effect to the People's Budget which imposed new taxes on landowners), a constitutional crisis arose when the Liberals ideally wanted to reduce the power of the Lords.

The crisis of the Finance Bill was resolved by the January election of 1910 after which the Lords passed the bill, but it did not end the constitutional crisis. A compromise was not found until after the December election of 1910 when a bill was produced dealing only with the powers, but promising in the preamble to reform the house on a popular basis.

The Parliament Act 1911 divided Bills into three classes.

1. Money bills, which could be given royal assent without the Lords' approval if they did not consent within one month.
2. On most other bills the House of Lords was given a suspensory veto. If the Commons passed the same measure in three successive Parliamentary sessions, covering at least two years, then it could become law without the agreement of the Lords.
3. The remaining class related to bills to extend the maximum term of the House of Commons beyond five years. The House of Lords retained equal legislative power for those Bills.

=== Parliament Act 1949 ===
Since 1911 there have been various attempts to reform the Lords, but none tackled the powers of the House except the Parliament Act 1949 which reduced the suspensory veto to two sessions and one year. By the time of the 1997 UK election there was still no consensus about a comprehensive reform of the upper chamber of Parliament.

== See also ==
- List of acts of the Parliament of the United Kingdom enacted without the House of Lords' consent
