= The Other Place =

The Other Place may refer to:

- The Other Place (novel), a 1999 young adult novel
- The Other Place (play), a 2012 play by Sharr White
- "The Other Place", a short story by Margaret Atwood
- The Other Place (collection), a collection of short stories by J. B. Priestley
- The Other Place (theatre), a theatre in Stratford-upon-Avon, England
- The other place, a euphemism used in some academic institutions and bicameral parliaments
- Hell seen from heaven and vice versa
- The Other Place, the world of demons in the 2003 fantasy novel series The Bartimaeus Sequence

== See also ==
- Another place (disambiguation)
- The Other Palace, a theatre in London
