= House of Lords =

Upper house of the UK Parliament

- Logo of the House of Lords

- Flag of the House of Lords

Type
- Type: Upper house of the Parliament of the United Kingdom

Leadership
- Lord Speaker: The Lord Forsyth of Drumlean since 2 February 2026
- Senior Deputy Speaker: The Lord Ponsonby of Shulbrede since 13 May 2026
- Leader of the House: The Baroness Smith of Basildon, Labour since 5 July 2024
- Shadow Leader of the House: The Lord True, Conservative since 8 July 2024
- Government Chief Whip: The Lord Kennedy of Southwark, Labour since 10 July 2024

Structure
- Seats: Not fixed (currently 796 members) (Note: This figure (correct as of 31 October 2026) excludes 19 peers who are on leave of absence or otherwise disqualified or suspended from sitting.)
- Political groups: Lords Spiritual: Bishops (25) (Note: The Lords Spiritual sit on the government benches in the House of Lords chamber and are so depicted in the diagram above, but do not form part of the government.); Lords Temporal HM Government: Labour Party (232) (Note: Including 15 Labour and Co-operative peers); HM Official Opposition: Conservative Party (247); Other groups: Liberal Democrats (79); Democratic Unionist Party (6); Ulster Unionist Party (3); Green Party of England and Wales (2); Plaid Cymru (2); Independents (1); Non-affiliated (44); Crossbench: Crossbenchers (154); Presiding officer: Lord Speaker (1)
- Length of term: Lords Temporal: for life; Lords Spiritual: for tenure as a diocesan bishop
- Salary: No annual salary, but tax-free daily allowance and expenses paid.

Meeting place
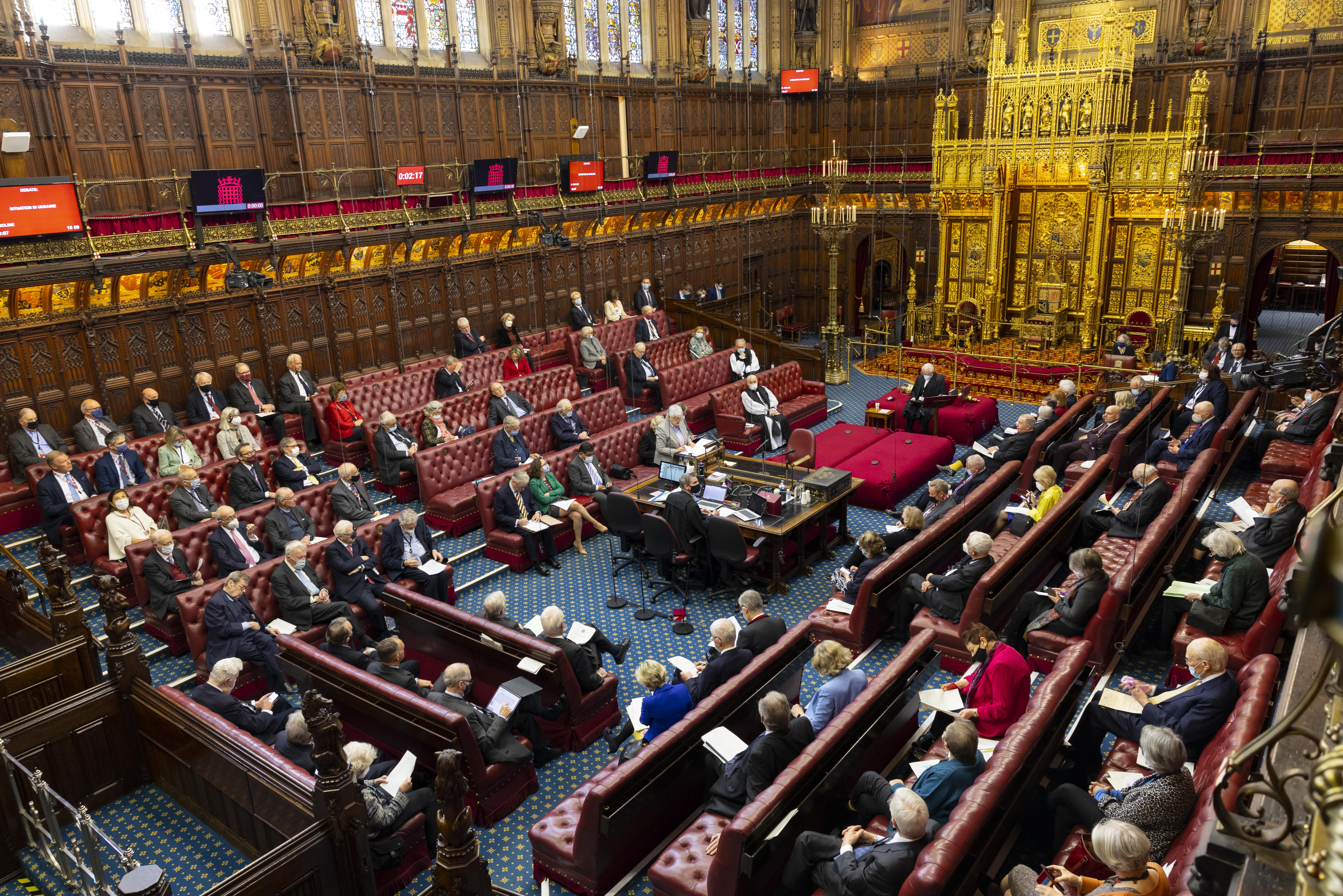
- House of Lords Chamber; Palace of Westminster, London; 51°29′55.7″N 0°07′29.5″W

Website
- www.parliament.uk/business/lords

The House of Lords (Note: Formally The Right Honourable the Lords Spiritual and Temporal in Parliament assembled. It is also referred to as the House of Peers or the Lords Spiritual and Temporal by metonymy. Within the House of Commons, it is euphemistically known as "another place" or "the other place". When abbreviated, the form HoL is used.) is the upper house of the Parliament of the United Kingdom. Like the lower house, the House of Commons, it meets in the Palace of Westminster in London, England. Its origins lie in the early 11th century and the emergence of bicameralism in the 14th century.

Unlike the House of Commons, membership of the Lords is not acquired by election. Most members are appointed for life as peers, on either a political or non-political basis. The House of Lords also includes up to 26 archbishops and bishops of the Church of England, known as Lords Spiritual. Since 2014, membership may be voluntarily relinquished or terminated upon expulsion.

For much of its history, hereditary peers were members of the House of Lords, and indeed made up the majority of the body's membership. Between 1999 and 2026, hereditary membership was limited to 92 excepted hereditary peers, then abolished altogether in 2026.

As the upper house of Parliament, the House of Lords has many similar functions to the House of Commons. It scrutinises legislation, holds the government to account, and considers and reports upon public policy. Members may also seek to introduce legislation or propose amendments to bills. Although it is unable to prevent bills passing into law except in certain limited circumstances, it may delay the enactment of bills for up to one year. In this capacity, as a body independent from the pressures of the political process, the House of Lords is said to act as a "revising chamber" focusing on legislative detail, while occasionally asking the House of Commons to reconsider its plans.

Peers may serve as government ministers, but in such cases are typically appointed junior ministers only, except for the leader of the House of Lords. The House of Lords does not control the term of the prime minister or of the government; only the Commons may vote to require the prime minister to resign or call an election. Unlike the House of Commons, which has a defined number of seats, the number of members in the House of Lords is not fixed. As of 31 October 2026, it has 796 sitting members. The King's Speech is delivered in the House of Lords chamber during the State Opening of Parliament. In addition to its role as the upper house, the House of Lords, through the law lords, acted as the final court of appeal in the United Kingdom judicial system until the establishment of the Supreme Court in 2009.

The House of Lords is the only upper house of any bicameral parliament in the world to be larger than its lower house. It is the second-largest legislative chamber in the world, behind the National People's Congress of China.

The House of Lords also has a Church of England role, in that Church measures must be tabled within the House by the Lords Spiritual. The United Kingdom is one of only three countries in the world to award religious figures a permanent seat in the legislature, the others being Iran and Vatican City.

== History ==
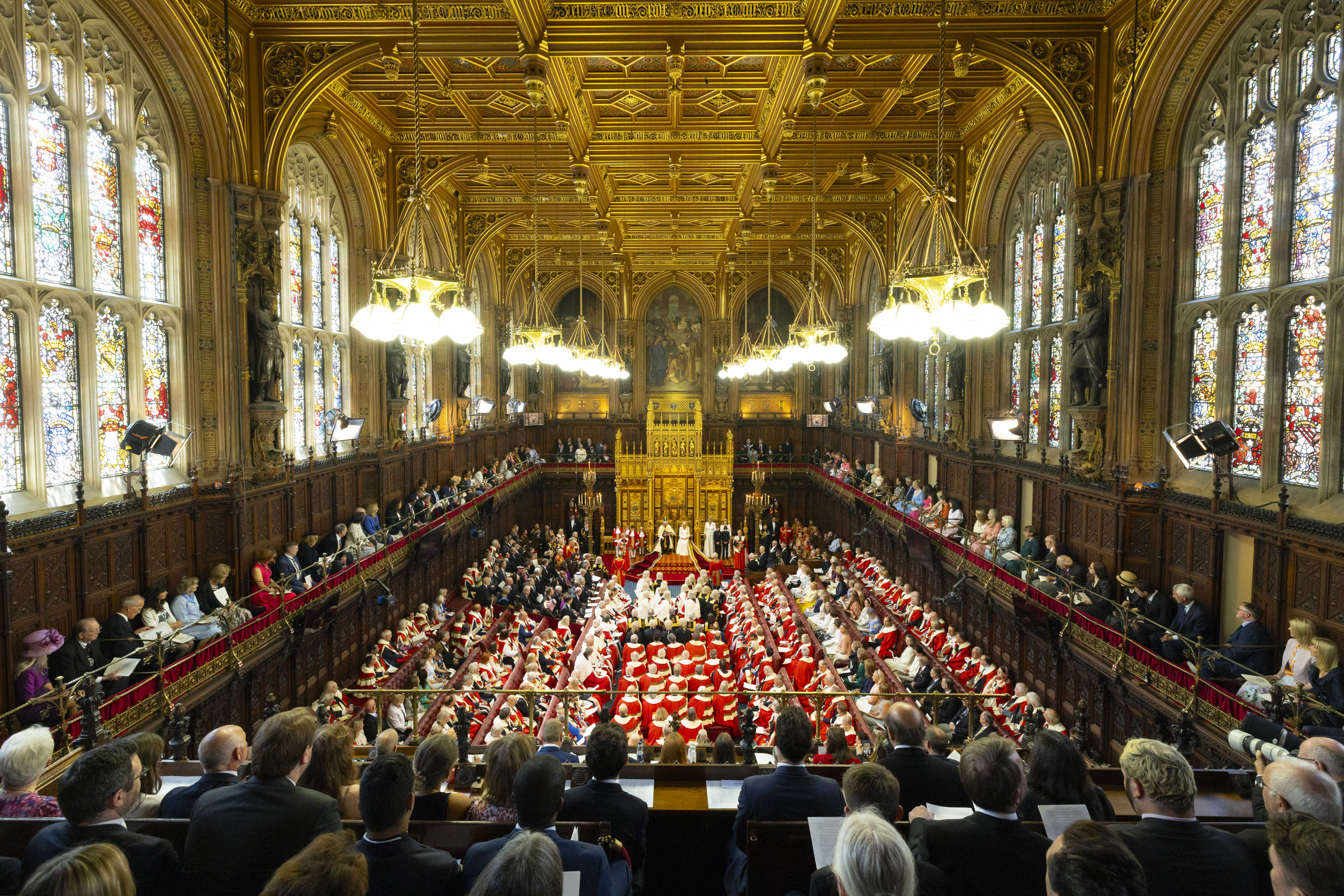
The constitutional concept of the King-in-Parliament is embodied within the chamber at the State Opening which inaugurates each parliamentary session (as in 2024, above).

Today's Parliament of the United Kingdom largely descends, in practice, from the Parliament of England, through the Treaty of Union of 1706 and the Acts of Union that implemented and executed the Treaty in 1707 and created a new Parliament of Great Britain to replace the Parliament of England and the Parliament of Scotland. This new parliament was, in effect, the continuation of the Parliament of England with the addition of 45 Members of Parliament (MPs) and 16 Peers to represent Scotland.

=== Early history ===
The House of Lords developed from the "Great Council" (Magnum Concilium) that advised the king during medieval times, dating back to the early 11th century. This royal council came to be composed of ecclesiastics, noblemen, and representatives of the counties of England and Wales (afterwards, representatives of the boroughs as well). The first English Parliament is often considered to be either Simon de Montfort's Parliament (held in 1265) or the "Model Parliament" (held in 1295), which included archbishops, bishops, abbots, earls, barons, and representatives of the shires and boroughs.

The power of Parliament grew slowly, fluctuating as the strength of the monarchy grew or declined. For example, during much of the reign of Edward II (1307–1327), the nobility was supreme, the Crown weak, and the shire and borough representatives entirely powerless.

During the reign of King Edward II's successor, Edward III (1327–1377), Parliament clearly separated into two distinct chambers: the House of Commons (consisting of the shire and borough representatives) and the House of Lords (consisting of the archbishops, bishops, abbots and nobility). The authority of Parliament continued to grow, and during the early 15th century both Houses exercised powers to an extent not seen before. The Lords were far more powerful than the Commons because of the great influence of the great landowners and the prelates of the realm.

The power of the nobility declined during the civil wars of the late 15th century, known as the Wars of the Roses. Much of the nobility was killed on the battlefield or executed for participation in the war, and many aristocratic estates were lost to the Crown. Moreover, feudalism was dying, and the feudal armies controlled by the barons became obsolete. Henry VII (1485–1509) clearly established the supremacy of the monarch, symbolised by the "Crown Imperial". The domination of the Sovereign continued to grow during the reigns of the Tudor monarchs in the 16th century. The Crown was at the height of its power during the reign of Henry VIII (1509–1547).

=== 17th–18th century ===
The House of Lords remained more powerful than the House of Commons, but the lower house continued to grow in influence, reaching a zenith in relation to the House of Lords during the middle of the 17th century. Conflicts between the king and the Parliament (for the most part, the House of Commons) ultimately led to the English Civil War during the 1640s. In 1649, after the defeat and execution of King Charles I, the Commonwealth of England was declared, but the nation was effectively under the overall control of Oliver Cromwell, Lord Protector of England, Scotland and Ireland.

The House of Lords was reduced to a largely powerless body, with Cromwell and his supporters in the Commons dominating the government. On 19 March 1649, the House of Lords was abolished by the Act abolishing the House of Peers, which declared that "The Commons of England [find] by too long experience that the House of Lords is useless and dangerous to the people of England." It was briefly de facto eclipsed by Cromwell's Other House. The House of Lords did not assemble again until the Convention Parliament met in 1660 and the monarchy was restored. It returned to its former position as the more powerful chamber of Parliament—a position it would occupy until the 19th century.

After the Acts of Union 1707, the peerage of Scotland elected sixteen of their number, the Scottish representative peers, to sit in the House of Lords. General elections were held with each Parliament, and by-elections to fill vacancies in between. The elections ceased after the Peerage Act 1963 granted all peers of Scotland a hereditary seat in the House of Lords.

The first election of Scottish representative peers took place on 15 February 1707 at the Parliament House, Edinburgh, shortly before the Parliament of Scotland was adjourned for the last time on 25 March. The commissioners for the barons and the burghs chose their representatives to the British House of Commons at the same time.

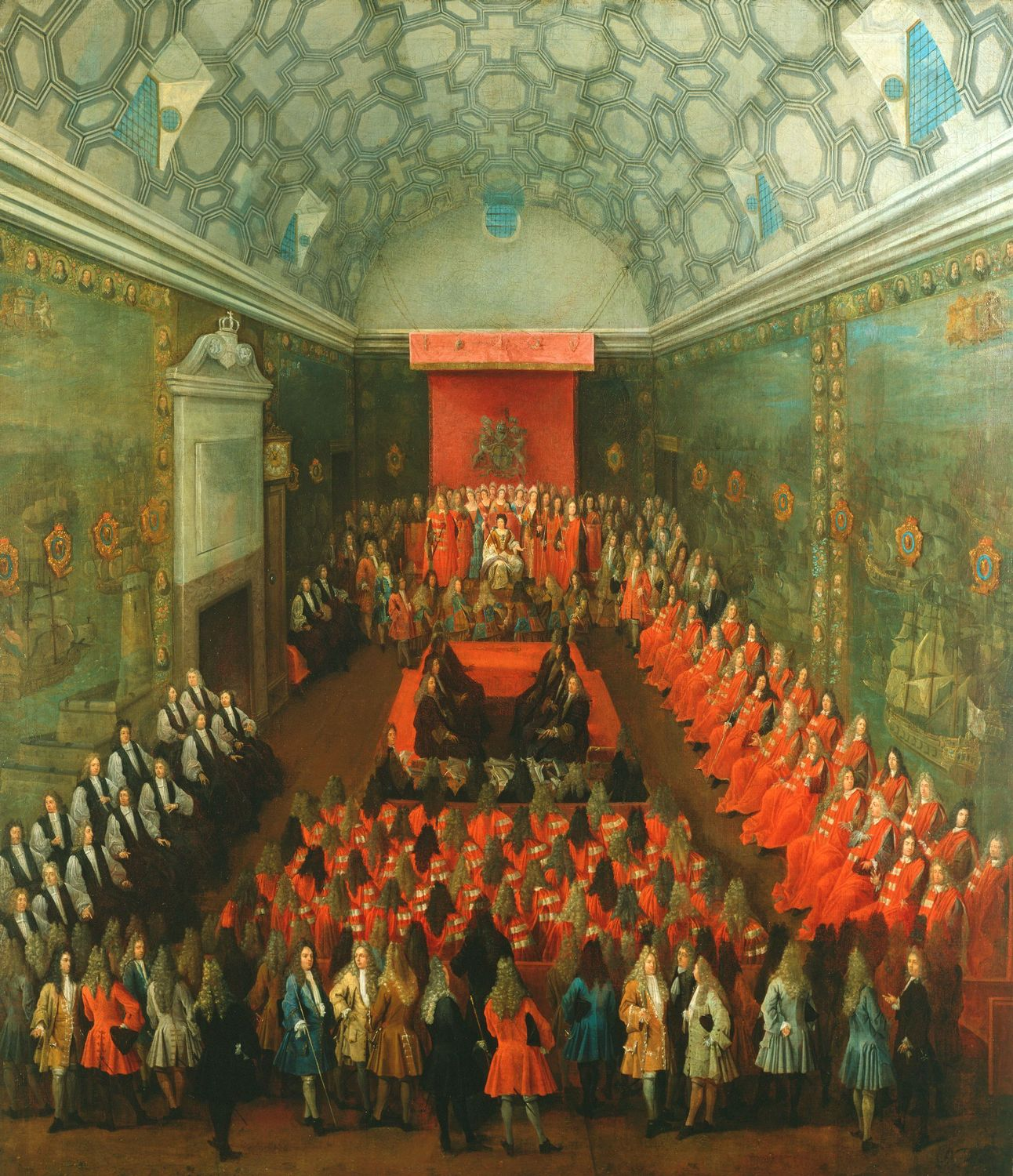
Queen Anne addressing the House of Lords, c. 1708–1714, by Peter Tillemans

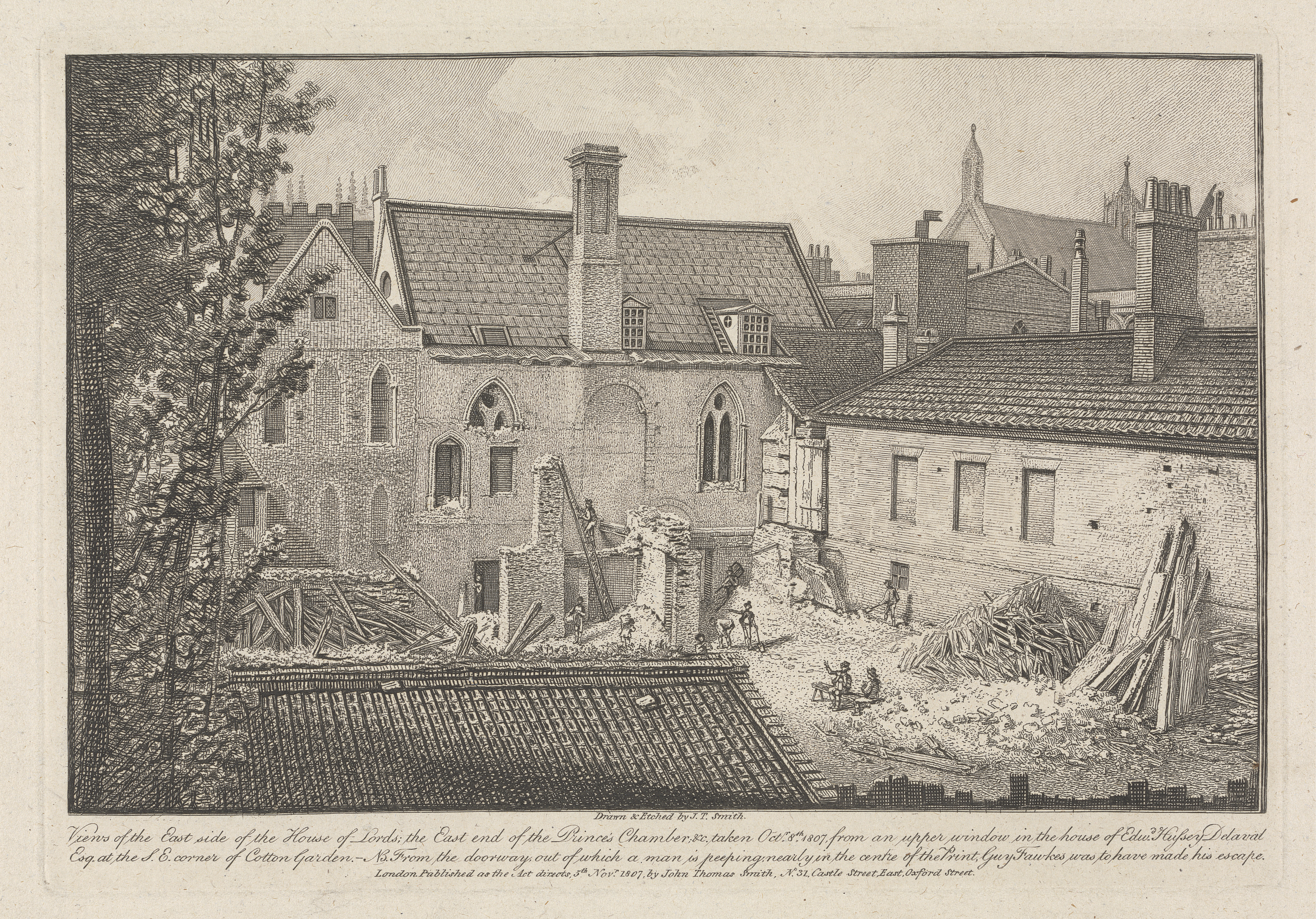
An early 19th-century illustration showing the east wall of the House of Lords in the centre

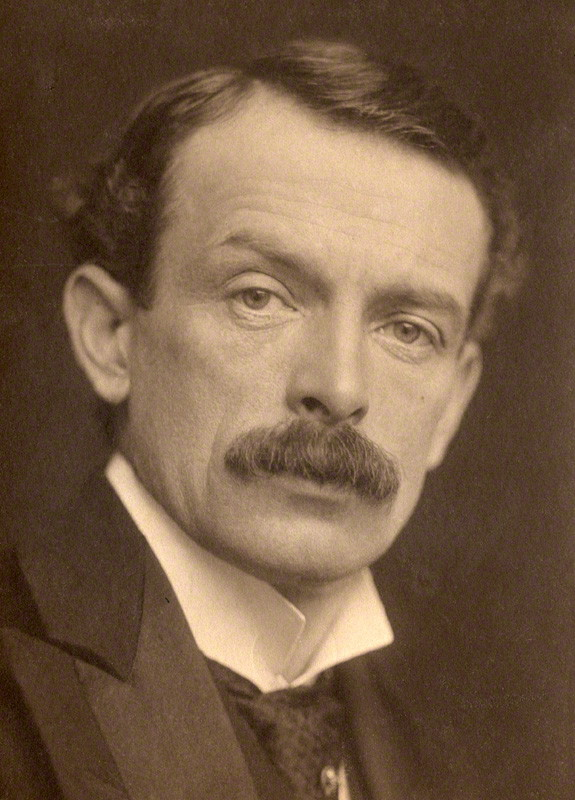
The rejection of the People's Budget, proposed by David Lloyd George (above), precipitated a political crisis in 1909.

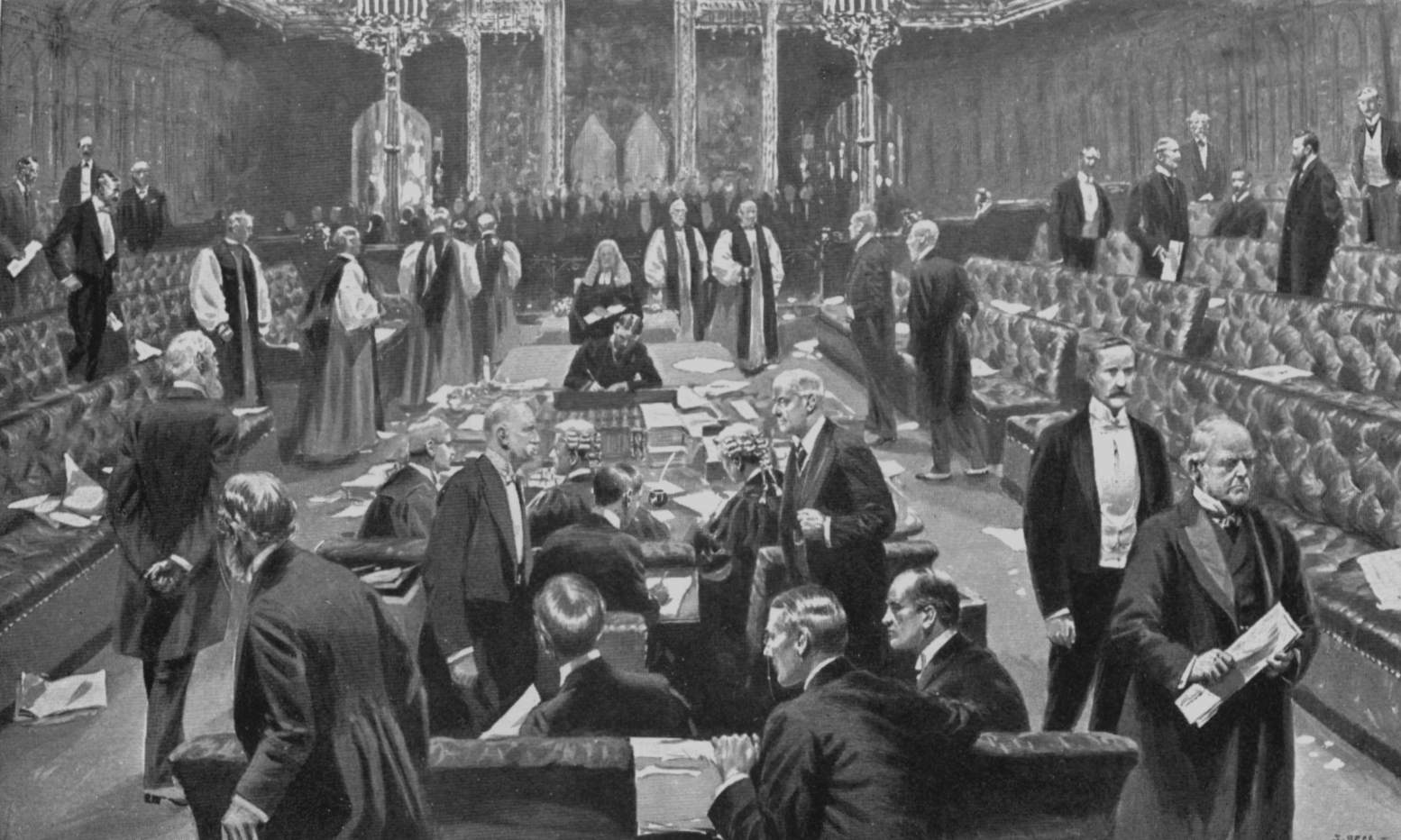
The House of Lords voting for the Parliament Act 1911

=== 19th century ===
The 19th century was marked by several changes to the House of Lords. The House, once a body of only about 50 members, had been greatly enlarged by the liberality of George III and his successors in creating peerages. The individual influence of a Lord of Parliament was thus diminished.

Moreover, the power of the House as a whole decreased, whilst that of the House of Commons grew. Particularly notable in the development of the Lower House's superiority was the Reform Act 1832. The electoral system of the House of Commons was far from democratic: property qualifications greatly restricted the size of the electorate, and the boundaries of many constituencies had not been changed for centuries. Entire cities such as Manchester had not even one representative in the House of Commons, while the 11 voters of Old Sarum retained their ancient right to elect two MPs despite living elsewhere. A small borough was susceptible to bribery, and was often under the control of a patron, whose nominee was guaranteed to win an election. Some aristocrats were patrons of numerous "pocket boroughs", and therefore controlled a considerable part of the membership of the House of Commons.

When the House of Commons passed a Reform Bill to correct some of these anomalies in 1831, the House of Lords rejected the proposal. The popular cause of reform, however, was not abandoned by the ministry, despite a second rejection of the bill in 1832. Prime Minister Charles Grey, 2nd Earl Grey advised the King to overwhelm opposition to the bill in the House of Lords by creating about 80 new pro-Reform peers. William IV originally balked at the proposal, which effectively threatened the opposition of the House of Lords, but at length relented.

Before the new peers were created, however, the Lords who opposed the bill admitted defeat and abstained from the vote, allowing the passage of the bill. The crisis damaged the political influence of the House of Lords but did not altogether end it. A vital reform was effected by the Lords themselves in 1868, when they changed their standing orders to abolish proxy voting, preventing Lords from voting without taking the trouble to attend. Over the course of the century the powers of the upper house were further reduced stepwise, culminating in the 20th century with the Parliament Act 1911; the Commons gradually became the stronger House of Parliament.

=== 20th century ===
The status of the House of Lords returned to the forefront of debate after the election of a Liberal Government in 1906. In 1909 the Chancellor of the Exchequer, David Lloyd George, introduced into the House of Commons the "People's Budget", which proposed a land tax targeting wealthy landowners. The popular measure, however, was defeated in the heavily Conservative House of Lords.

Having made the powers of the House of Lords a primary campaign issue, the Liberals were narrowly re-elected in January 1910. The Liberals had lost most of their support in the Lords, which was routinely rejecting Liberals' bills. Prime Minister H. H. Asquith then proposed that the powers of the House of Lords be severely curtailed. After a further general election in December 1910, and with a reluctant promise by King George V to create sufficient new Liberal peers to overcome the Lords' opposition to the measure if necessary, the Asquith Government secured the passage of a bill to curtail the powers of the House of Lords. The Parliament Act 1911 effectively abolished the power of the House of Lords to reject legislation, or to amend it in a way unacceptable to the House of Commons; and most bills could be delayed for no more than three parliamentary sessions or two calendar years. It was not meant to be a permanent solution; more comprehensive reforms were planned. Neither party, however, pursued reforms with much enthusiasm, and the House of Lords remained primarily hereditary. The Parliament Act 1949 reduced the delaying power of the House of Lords further to two sessions or one year. In 1958, the predominantly hereditary nature of the House of Lords was changed by the Life Peerages Act 1958, which authorised the creation of life baronies, with no numerical limits. The number of life peers then gradually increased, though not at a constant rate.

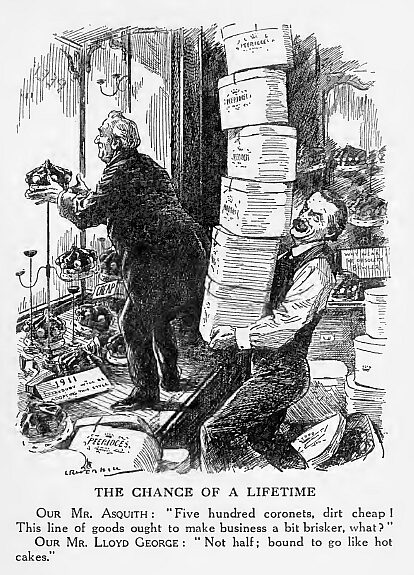
Punch 1911 cartoon shows Asquith and Lloyd George preparing coronets for 500 new peers to threaten takeover of the House of Lords.

The Labour Party had, for most of the 20th century, a commitment, based on the party's historic opposition to class privilege, to abolish the House of Lords, or at least expel the hereditary element. In 1968 the Labour Government of Harold Wilson attempted to reform the House of Lords by introducing a system under which hereditary peers would be allowed to remain in the House and take part in debate, but would be unable to vote. This plan, however, was defeated in the House of Commons by a coalition of traditionalist Conservatives (such as Enoch Powell), and Labour members who continued to advocate the outright abolition of the Upper House (such as Michael Foot).

When Foot became leader of the Labour Party in 1980, abolition of the House of Lords became a part of the party's agenda; under his successor, Neil Kinnock, however, a reformed Upper House was proposed instead. In the meantime, the creation of new hereditary peerages (except for members of the Royal Family) has been arrested, with the exception of three that were created during the administration of Conservative PM Margaret Thatcher in the 1980s.

Whilst some hereditary peers were at best apathetic, the Labour Party's clear commitments were not lost on Merlin Hanbury-Tracy, 7th Baron Sudeley, who for decades was considered an expert on the House of Lords. In December 1979 the Conservative Monday Club published his extensive paper entitled Lords Reform – Why tamper with the House of Lords? and in July 1980 The Monarchist carried another article by Sudeley entitled "Why Reform or Abolish the House of Lords?". In 1990 he wrote a further booklet for the Monday Club entitled "The Preservation of the House of Lords".

=== 21st century ===
In 2019, a seven-month enquiry by Naomi Ellenbogen found that one in five staff of the House had experienced bullying or harassment which they did not report for fear of reprisals. This was preceded by several cases, including Liberal Democrat Anthony Lester, Lord Lester of Herne Hill, of Lords using their position to sexually harass or abuse women.

In 2020, the Johnson government considered moving the House of Lords from London to a city in Northern England, likely York, or Birmingham, in the Midlands, in an attempt to "reconnect" the area. It was unclear how the King's Speech would be conducted in the event of a move. The idea was received negatively by many peers.

== Reforms ==
With the advent of democratic politics in the United Kingdom, beginning with the Reform Acts from 1832 to 1928, the aristocratic House of Lords was increasingly perceived as an anachronism. Many attempts to reform it have been made, and some have succeeded, most notably the removal of most hereditary peers in 1999, and the remainder in 2026.

=== First admission of women ===
There were no women sitting in the House of Lords until 1958, when a small number came into the chamber as a result of the Life Peerages Act 1958. One of these was Irene Curzon, 2nd Baroness Ravensdale, who had inherited her father's peerage in 1925 and was made a life peer to enable her to sit. After a campaign stretching back in some cases to the 1920s, another twelve women who held hereditary peerages in their own right were admitted with the passage of the Peerage Act 1963.

=== New Labour era ===
The Labour Party included in its 1997 general election manifesto a commitment to remove the hereditary peerage from the House of Lords. Their subsequent election victory in 1997 under Tony Blair led to the denouement of the traditional House of Lords. The Labour government introduced legislation to expel all hereditary peers from the Upper House as a first step in Lords reform. As a part of a compromise, however, it agreed to permit 92 hereditary peers to remain until the reforms were complete. Thus, all but 92 hereditary peers were expelled under the House of Lords Act 1999 (see below for its provisions), making the House of Lords predominantly an appointed house.

In 2000, the Wakeham Commission proposed introducing a 20% elected element to the Lords, but this plan was widely criticised. A parliamentary Joint Committee was established in 2001 to resolve the issue, but it reached no conclusion and instead gave Parliament seven options to choose from (fully appointed, 20% elected, 40% elected, 50% elected, 60% elected, 80% elected, and fully elected). In a confusing series of votes in February 2003, all of these options were defeated, although the 80% elected option fell by just three votes in the Commons. Socialist MPs favouring outright abolition voted against all the options.

In 2005, a cross-party group of senior MPs (Kenneth Clarke, Paul Tyler, Tony Wright, George Young, and Robin Cook) published a report proposing that 70% of members of the House of Lords should be elected – each member for a single long term – by the single transferable vote system. Most of the remainder were to be appointed by a Commission to ensure a mix of "skills, knowledge and experience". This proposal was also not implemented. A cross-party campaign initiative called "Elect the Lords" was set up to make the case for a predominantly elected Upper Chamber in the run up to the 2005 general election.

At the 2005 election, the Labour Party proposed further reform of the Lords, but without specific details. The Conservative Party, which had, prior to 1997, opposed any tampering with the House of Lords, favoured an 80% elected Lords, while the Liberal Democrats called for a fully elected Senate. During 2006, a cross-party committee discussed Lords reform, with the aim of reaching a consensus: its findings were published in early 2007.

On 7 March 2007, members of the House of Commons voted ten times on a variety of alternative compositions for the Upper Chamber. Outright abolition, a wholly appointed, a 20% elected, a 40% elected, a 50% elected, and a 60% elected House of Lords were all defeated in turn. Finally, the vote for an 80% elected Lords was won by 305 votes to 267, and the vote for a wholly elected Lords was won by an even greater margin, 337 to 224. Significantly, this last vote represented an overall majority of MPs.

Furthermore, examination of the names of MPs voting at each division shows that, of the 305 who voted for the 80% elected option, 211 went on to vote for the 100% elected option. Given that this vote took place after the vote on 80% – whose result was already known when the vote on 100% took place – this showed a clear preference for a fully elected Upper House among those who voted for the only other option that passed. But this was nevertheless only an indicative vote, and many political and legislative hurdles remained to be overcome for supporters of an elected House of Lords. Lords, soon after, rejected this proposal and voted for an entirely appointed House of Lords.

In July 2008, Jack Straw, the Secretary of State for Justice and Lord Chancellor, introduced a white paper to the House of Commons proposing to replace the House of Lords with an 80–100% elected chamber, with one third being elected at each general election, to serve a term of approximately 12–15 years. The white paper stated that, as the peerage would be totally separated from membership of the Upper House, the name "House of Lords" would no longer be appropriate. It went on to explain that there was cross-party consensus for the Chamber to be re-titled the "Senate of the United Kingdom"; however, to ensure the debate remained on the role of the Upper House rather than its title, the white paper was neutral on the title issue.

On 30 November 2009, a Code of Conduct for Members of the House of Lords was agreed by them. Certain amendments were agreed by them on 30 March 2010 and on 12 June 2014.

The scandal over expenses in the Commons was at its highest pitch only six months before, and the Labourite leadership under Janet Royall, Baroness Royall of Blaisdon determined that something sympathetic should be done.

Meg Russell stated in an article, "Is the House of Lords already reformed?", three essential features of a legitimate House of Lords: The first was that it must have adequate powers over legislation to make the government think twice before making a decision. The House of Lords, she argued, had enough power to make it relevant. (In his first year, Tony Blair was defeated 38 times in the Lords—but that was before the major reform with the House of Lords Act 1999.) Second, as to the composition of the Lords, Meg Russell suggested that the composition must be distinct from the Commons, otherwise it would render the Lords useless. Third was the perceived legitimacy of the Lords. She stated, "In general legitimacy comes with election."

=== Coalition reforms ===
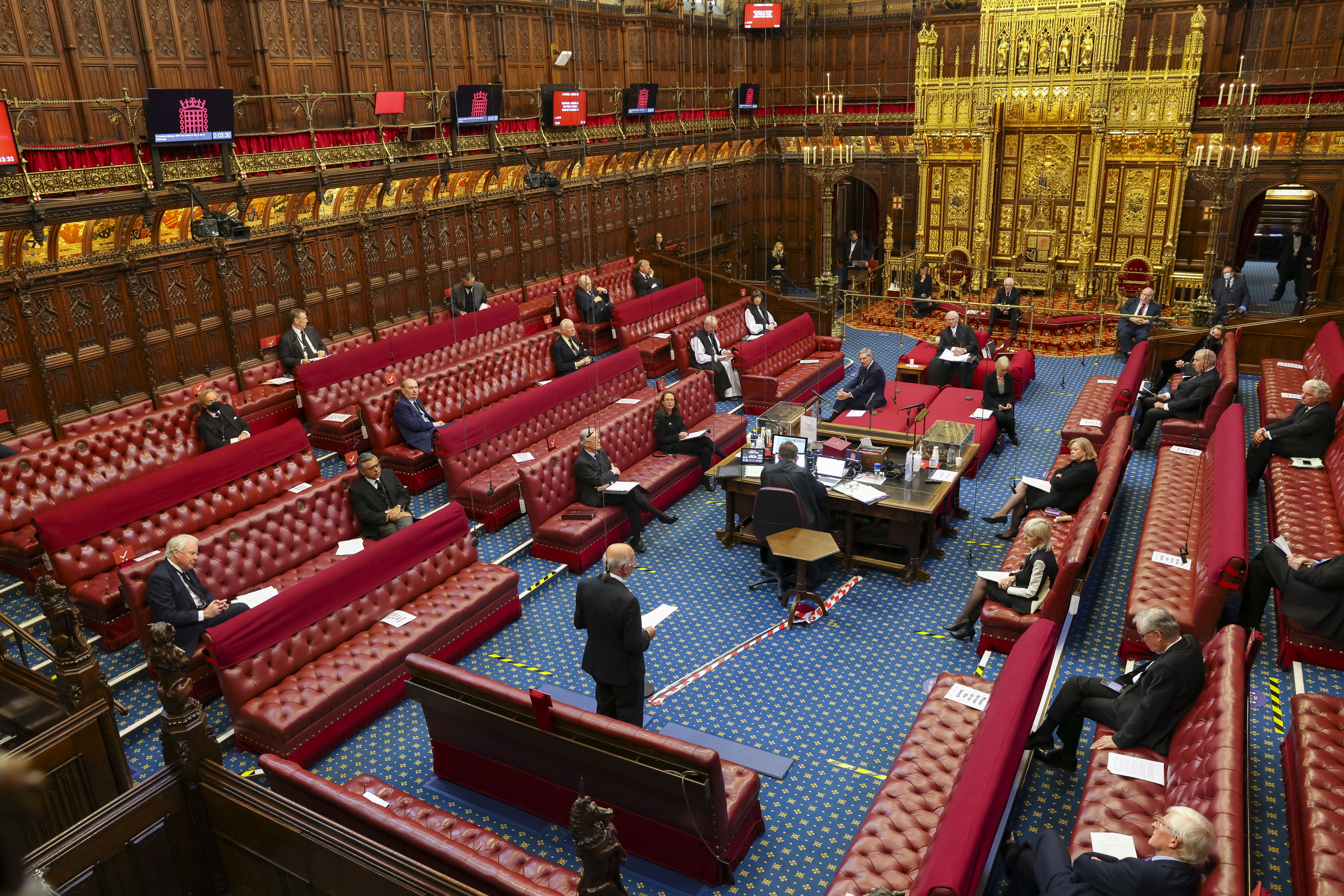
The House of Lords paid tribute to Prince Philip, Duke of Edinburgh, 12 April 2021. (COVID-19 precautions required the maintenance of social distancing on this occasion.)

The Conservative–Liberal Democrat coalition agreed, after the 2010 general election, to outline clearly a provision for a wholly or mainly elected second chamber, elected by proportional representation. These proposals sparked a debate on 29 June 2010. As an interim measure, appointment of new peers would reflect the shares of the vote secured by the political parties in the last general election.

Detailed proposals for Lords reform, including a draft House of Lords Reform Bill, were published on 17 May 2011. These included a 300-member hybrid house, of whom 80% would be elected. A further 20% would be appointed, and reserve space would be included for some Church of England archbishops and bishops. Under the proposals, members would also serve single non-renewable terms of 15 years. Former MPs would be allowed to stand for election to the Upper House, but members of the Upper House would not be immediately allowed to become MPs.

The details of the proposal were:

- The upper chamber shall continue to be known as the House of Lords for legislative purposes.
- The reformed House of Lords should have 300 members of whom 240 are "Elected Members" and 60 appointed "Independent Members". Up to 12 Church of England archbishops and bishops may sit in the house as ex officio "Lords Spiritual".
- Elected Members will serve a single, non-renewable term of 15 years.
- Elections to the reformed Lords should take place at the same time as elections to the House of Commons.
- Elected Members should be elected using the Single Transferable Vote system of proportional representation.
- Twenty Independent Members (a third) shall take their seats within the reformed house at the same time as elected members do so, and for the same 15-year term.
- Independent Members will be appointed by the King after being proposed by the Prime Minister acting on advice of an Appointments Commission.
- There will no longer be a link between the peerage system and membership of the upper house.
- The current powers of the House of Lords would not change and the House of Commons shall retain its status as the primary House of Parliament.

The proposals were considered by a Joint Committee on House of Lords Reform made up of both MPs and Peers, which issued its final report on 23 April 2012, making the following suggestions:

- The reformed House of Lords should have 450 members.
- Party groupings, including the Crossbenchers, should choose which of their members are retained in the transition period, with the percentage of members allotted to each group based on their share of the peers with high attendance during a given period.
- Up to 12 Lords Spiritual should be retained in a reformed House of Lords.

Deputy Prime Minister Nick Clegg introduced the House of Lords Reform Bill 2012 on 27 June 2012 which built on proposals published on 17 May 2011. However, this Bill was abandoned by the Government on 6 August 2012, following opposition from within the Conservative Party.

==== House of Lords Reform Act 2014 ====
A private member's bill to introduce some reforms was introduced by Dan Byles in 2013. The House of Lords Reform Act 2014 received Royal Assent in 2014. Under the new law:

- All peers can retire or resign from the chamber (prior to this only hereditary peers could disclaim their peerages).
- Peers can be disqualified for non-attendance.
- Peers can be removed for receiving prison sentences of a year or more.

==== House of Lords (Expulsion and Suspension) Act 2015 ====
The House of Lords (Expulsion and Suspension) Act 2015 authorised the House to expel or suspend members.

==== Lords Spiritual (Women) Act 2015 ====
This Act made provision to preferentially admit female bishops of the Church of England to the Lords Spiritual over male ones in the 10 years following its commencement (2015 to 2025, later extended to 2030). This came as a consequence of the Church of England deciding in 2014 to begin to ordain women as bishops. In 2015, Rachel Treweek, Bishop of Gloucester, became the first woman to sit as a Lord Spiritual in the House of Lords due to the Act. As of 2025, eight women bishops sit as Lords Spiritual, seven of them having been accelerated due to this Act.

=== Starmer ministry ===
As of 2024, the policy of the Labour Party is to abolish the House of Lords, and to replace it with an elected second chamber, albeit not in the first term of a Labour government. Following the 2024 general election, a bill was introduced with the aim of removing all remaining hereditary peers from the House of Lords. The Bill received Royal Assent on 18 March and the provision excluding hereditary peers came into force at the end of that session of Parliament on 29 April 2026.

== Size ==
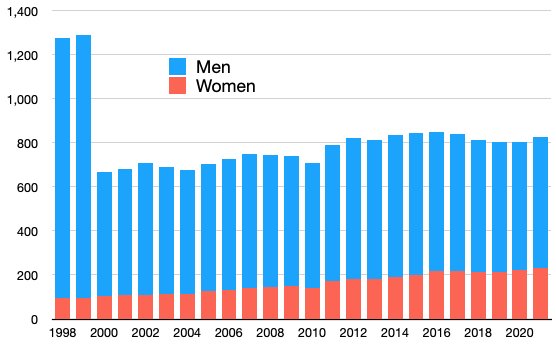
Number of members of the House of Lords from 1998 to 2021

The size of the House of Lords has varied greatly throughout its history. The English House of Lords—then comprising 168 members—was joined at Westminster by 16 Scottish peers to represent the peerage of Scotland—a total of 184 nobles—in 1707's first Parliament of Great Britain. A further 28 Irish members to represent the peerage of Ireland were added in 1801 to the first Parliament of the United Kingdom. From about 220 peers in the eighteenth century, the house saw continued expansion. From about 850 peers in 1951/52, the numbers rose further with more life peers after the Life Peerages Act 1958 and the inclusion of all Scottish peers and the first female peers in the Peerage Act 1963. It reached a record size of 1,330 in October 1999, immediately before the major Lords reform (House of Lords Act 1999) reduced it to 669, mostly life peers, by March 2000.

The chamber's membership again expanded in the following decades, increasing to above eight hundred active members in 2014 and prompting further reforms in the House of Lords Reform Act 2014.

In April 2011, a cross-party group of former leading politicians, including many senior members of the House of Lords, called on the Prime Minister David Cameron to stop creating new peers. He had created 117 new peers between entering office in May 2010 and leaving in July 2016, a faster rate of elevation than any PM in British history; at the same time his government had tried (in vain) to reduce the House of Commons by 50, from 650 to 600 MPs.

In August 2014, despite there being a seating capacity for only around 230 to 400 on the benches in the Lords chamber, the House had 774 active members (plus 54 who were not entitled to attend or vote, having been suspended or granted leave of absence). This made the House of Lords the largest parliamentary chamber in any democracy. In August 2014, former Speaker of the House of Commons Betty Boothroyd requested that "older peers should retire gracefully" to ease the overcrowding in the House of Lords. She also criticised successive prime ministers for filling the second chamber with "lobby fodder" in an attempt to help their policies become law. She made her remarks days before a new batch of peers were due to be created and several months after the passage of the House of Lords Reform Act 2014, enabling life peers to retire or resign their seats in the House, which had previously only been possible for hereditary peers and bishops.

In August 2015, when 45 more peers were created in the Dissolution Honours, the total number of eligible members of the Lords increased to 826. In a report entitled "Does size matter?" the BBC said: "Increasingly, yes. Critics argue the House of Lords is the second largest legislature after the Chinese National People's Congress and dwarfs upper houses in other bicameral democracies such as the United States (100 senators), France (348 senators), Australia (76 senators), Canada (105 appointed senators) and India (250 members). The Lords is also larger than the Supreme People's Assembly of North Korea (687 members)", and that "Peers grumble that there is not enough room to accommodate all of their colleagues in the Chamber, where there are only about 400 seats, and say they are constantly jostling for space – particularly during high-profile sittings", but added, "On the other hand, defenders of the Lords say that it does a vital job scrutinising legislation, a lot of which has come its way from the Commons in recent years".

In late 2016, a Lord Speaker's committee was formed to examine the issue of overcrowding, with fears membership could swell to above 1,000, and in October 2017 the committee presented its findings. In December 2017, the Lords debated and broadly approved its report, which proposed a cap on membership at 600 peers, with a fifteen-year term limit for new peers and a "two-out, one-in" limit on new appointments. By October 2018, the Lord Speaker's committee commended the reduction in peers' numbers, noting that the rate of departures had been greater than expected, with the House of Commons Public Administration and Constitutional Affairs Select Committee approving the progress achieved without legislation.

By June 2026, with the retirement of over two hundred peers since the passage of the House of Lords Reform Act 2014 and the exclusion of hereditary peers under the House of Lords (Hereditary Peers) Act 2026, the number of active peers had been reduced to a total of 775. This total, however, remains greater than the membership of 669 peers in March 2000, after implementation of the House of Lords Act 1999 removed the bulk of the hereditary peers from their seats; it is well above the proposed 600-member cap, and is still larger than the House of Commons's 650 members.

== Functions ==
Brief introduction of the House of Lords

=== Legislative functions ===
All legislation, with the exception of money bills, may be introduced in either the House of Lords or House of Commons.

The House of Lords debates legislation, and has the power to amend or reject bills. However, the power of the Lords to reject a bill passed by the House of Commons is severely restricted by the Parliament Acts. Under those Acts, certain types of bills may be presented for Royal Assent without the consent of the House of Lords (i.e. the Commons can override the Lords' veto). The House of Lords cannot delay a money bill (a bill that, in the view of the Speaker of the House of Commons, solely concerns national taxation or public funds) for more than one month.

Other public bills cannot be delayed by the House of Lords for more than two parliamentary sessions, or one calendar year. These provisions, however, only apply to public bills that originate in the House of Commons, and cannot have the effect of extending a parliamentary term beyond five years. A further restriction is a constitutional convention known as the Salisbury Convention, which means that the House of Lords does not oppose legislation promised in the Government's election manifesto.

By a custom that prevailed even before the Parliament Acts, the House of Lords is further restrained insofar as financial bills are concerned. The House of Lords may neither originate a bill concerning taxation or Supply (supply of treasury or exchequer funds), nor amend a bill so as to insert a taxation or Supply-related provision. (The House of Commons, however, often waives its privileges and allows the Upper House to make amendments with financial implications.) Moreover, the Upper House may not amend any Supply Bill. The House of Lords formerly maintained the absolute power to reject a bill relating to revenue or Supply, but this power was curtailed by the Parliament Acts.

The House of Lords also considers and approves statutory instruments across a wide range of policy areas, including national security, public health, and economic regulation. Since 2000, it has approved a number of significant orders, notably those made under the Terrorism Act 2000 to proscribe organisations including National Action (2016), the extension of proscription to the entirety of Hamas (2021), the Wagner Group (2023), and Palestine Action (2025), as well as sanctions regulations under the Sanctions and Anti-Money Laundering Act 2018 following Russia’s invasion of Ukraine, and public health regulations made under the Public Health (Control of Disease) Act 1984 during the COVID-19 pandemic (2020–2022).

=== Relationship with the government ===
The House of Lords does not control the term of the prime minister or of the government. Only the lower house may force the prime minister to resign or call elections by passing a motion of no-confidence or by withdrawing supply. Therefore, the House of Lords' oversight of the government is limited.

Most Cabinet ministers are from the House of Commons rather than the House of Lords. In particular, all prime ministers since 1902 have been members of the lower house (Alec Douglas-Home, who became prime minister in 1963 whilst still an earl, disclaimed his peerage and was elected to the Commons soon after his term began). In recent history, it has been very rare for major cabinet positions (except Lord Chancellor and Leader of the House of Lords) to have been filled by peers.

Exceptions include:

- Lord Carrington, who was the Secretary of State for Defence from 1970 to 1974, Secretary of State for Energy briefly for two months in early 1974 and Secretary of State for Foreign and Commonwealth Affairs between 1979 and 1982
- Lord Cockfield, who served as Secretary of State for Trade and President of the Board of Trade
- Lord Young of Graffham, who was Minister without Portfolio, then Secretary of State for Employment and then Secretary of State for Trade and Industry and President of the Board of Trade from 1984 to 1989
- Baroness Amos, who served as Secretary of State for International Development
- Lord Adonis, who served as Secretary of State for Transport
- Peter Mandelson, who served as First Secretary of State, Secretary of State for Business, Innovation and Skills and President of the Board of Trade
- George Robertson was briefly a peer whilst serving as Secretary of State for Defence before resigning to take up the post of Secretary General of NATO.
- Baroness Morgan of Cotes was appointed as Secretary of State for Culture, Media and Sport as an MP, but retained the office when she was appointed to the House of Lords.
- David Cameron, Lord Cameron of Chipping Norton and a former Prime Minister, was appointed Foreign Secretary and a member of the House of Lords in 2023.

From 1999 to 2010 the Attorney General for England and Wales was a member of the House of Lords; as of July 2024, the Attorney General is once again a peer.

The House of Lords remains a source for junior ministers and members of government. Like the House of Commons, the Lords also has a Government Chief Whip as well as several Junior Whips. Where a government department is not represented by a minister in the Lords or one is not available, government whips will act as spokesmen for them.

=== Former judicial role ===
Historically, the House of Lords held several judicial functions. Most notably, until 2009 the House of Lords served as the court of last resort for most instances of UK law. Since 1 October 2009 this role is now held by the Supreme Court of the United Kingdom.

The Lords' judicial functions originated from the ancient role of the Curia Regis as a body that addressed the petitions of the King's subjects. The functions were exercised not by the whole House, but by a committee of "Law Lords". The bulk of the House's judicial business was conducted by the twelve Lords of Appeal in Ordinary, who were specifically appointed for this purpose under the Appellate Jurisdiction Act 1876. In London Street Tramways Co. v. London County Council, the House of Lords imposed upon itself a rule that required it to follow its own precedent. This was the prevailing view till July 1966, when Lord Chancellor Gerald Gardiner announced in a Practice Statement that the House of Lords had resolved that it could "depart from its previous decision when it appeared right to do so".

The judicial functions could also be exercised by Lords of Appeal (other members of the House who happened to have held high judicial office). No Lord of Appeal in Ordinary or Lord of Appeal could sit judicially beyond the age of seventy-five. The judicial business of the Lords was supervised by the Senior Lord of Appeal in Ordinary and their deputy, the Second Senior Lord of Appeal in Ordinary.

The jurisdiction of the House of Lords extended, in civil and in criminal cases, to appeals from the courts of England and Wales, and of Northern Ireland. From Scotland, appeals were possible only in civil cases; Scotland's High Court of Justiciary is the highest court in criminal matters. The House of Lords was not the United Kingdom's only court of last resort; in some cases, the Judicial Committee of the Privy Council performs such a function. The jurisdiction of the Privy Council in the United Kingdom, however, is relatively restricted; it encompasses appeals from ecclesiastical courts, disputes under the House of Commons Disqualification Act 1975, and a few other minor matters. Issues related to devolution were transferred from the Privy Council to the Supreme Court in 2009.

The twelve Law Lords did not all hear every case; rather, after World War II cases were heard by panels known as Appellate Committees, each of which normally consisted of five members (selected by the Senior Lord). An Appellate Committee hearing an important case could consist of more than five members. Though Appellate Committees met in separate committee rooms, judgement was given in the Lords Chamber itself. No further appeal lay from the House of Lords, although the House of Lords could refer a "preliminary question" to the European Court of Justice in cases involving an element of European Union law, and a case could be brought at the European Court of Human Rights if the House of Lords did not provide a satisfactory remedy in cases where the European Convention on Human Rights was relevant.

A distinct judicial function—one in which the whole House used to participate—is that of trying impeachments. Impeachments were brought by the House of Commons, and tried in the House of Lords; a conviction required only a majority of the Lords voting. Impeachments, however, are to all intents and purposes obsolete; the last impeachment was that of Henry Dundas, 1st Viscount Melville, in 1806.

Similarly, the House of Lords was once the court that tried peers charged with high treason or felony. The House would be presided over not by the Lord Chancellor, but by the Lord High Steward, an official especially appointed for the occasion of the trial. If Parliament was not in session, then peers could be tried in a separate court, known as the Lord High Steward's Court. Only peers, their wives, and their widows (unless remarried) were entitled to such trials; the Lords Spiritual were tried in ecclesiastical courts. In 1948, the right of peers to be tried in such special courts was abolished; now, they are tried in the regular courts. The last such trial in the House was of Edward Russell, 26th Baron de Clifford, in 1935. An illustrative dramatisation circa 1928 of a trial of a peer (the fictional Duke of Denver) on a charge of murder (a felony) is portrayed in the 1972 BBC Television adaption of Dorothy L. Sayers' Lord Peter Wimsey mystery Clouds of Witness.

The Constitutional Reform Act 2005 resulted in the creation of a separate Supreme Court of the United Kingdom, to which the judicial function of the House of Lords, and some of the judicial functions of the Judicial Committee of the Privy Council, were transferred. In addition, the office of Lord Chancellor was reformed by the act, removing his ability to act as both a government minister and a judge. This was motivated in part by concerns about the historical admixture of legislative, judicial, and executive power. The new Supreme Court is located at Middlesex Guildhall.

== Membership ==
=== Lords Spiritual ===
Members of the House of Lords who sit by virtue of their ecclesiastical offices are known as Lords Spiritual. Formerly, the Lords Spiritual were the majority in the English House of Lords, comprising the church's archbishops, (diocesan) bishops, abbots, and those priors entitled to wear a mitre. After the English Reformation's high point in 1539, only the archbishops and bishops continued to attend, as the Dissolution of the Monasteries had just disposed of and suppressed the positions of abbot and prior. In 1642, during the few gatherings of the Lords convened during English Interregnum which saw periodic war, the Lords Spiritual were excluded altogether, but they returned under the Clergy Act 1661.

The number of Lords Spiritual was further restricted by the Bishopric of Manchester Act 1847, and by later Acts. The Lords Spiritual can now number no more than 26: including five who sit by right regardless of seniority (the archbishops Canterbury and York, and the Bishops of London, Durham and Winchester), and the 21 longest-serving bishops from other dioceses in the Church of England (excluding the dioceses of Sodor and Man and Gibraltar in Europe, as these lie entirely outside the UK). Following a change to the law in 2014 to allow women to be ordained archbishops and bishops, the Lords Spiritual (Women) Act 2015 was passed, which provides that whenever a vacancy arises among the Lords Spiritual during the ten years following the Act coming into force, the vacancy has to be filled by a woman, if one is eligible. This does not apply to the two archbishops and the three bishops who sit by right.

The current Lords Spiritual represent only the Church of England. Archbishops and bishops of the Church of Scotland historically sat in the Parliament of Scotland but were finally excluded in 1689 (after a number of previous exclusions) when the Church of Scotland became permanently Presbyterian. There are no longer archbishops and bishops in the Church of Scotland, and that Church has never sent members to sit in the Westminster House of Lords. The Church of Ireland did obtain representation in the House of Lords after the union of Ireland and Great Britain in 1801. Of the Church of Ireland's ecclesiastics, four (one archbishop and three bishops) were to sit at any one time, with the members rotating at the end of every parliamentary session (which normally lasted about one year). The Church of Ireland, however, was disestablished in 1871, and thereafter ceased to be represented by Lords Spiritual. Bishops of Welsh sees in the Church of England originally sat in the House of Lords (after 1847, only if their seniority within the church entitled them to), but the Church in Wales ceased to be a part of the Church of England in 1920 and was simultaneously disestablished in Wales. Accordingly, the four bishops of the Church in Wales were no longer eligible to sit in the House of Lords from 1920 onwards, and their places were taken by the next four English bishops who were eligible by seniority.

Other ecclesiastics have sat in the House of Lords as Lords Temporal in recent times: Immanuel Jakobovits, Chief Rabbi of the United Synagogue (the largest organisation of Orthodox Jewish congregations in Britain) was appointed to the House of Lords (with the consent of Queen Elizabeth II, who acted on the advice of Prime Minister Margaret Thatcher), as was his successor, Chief Rabbi Jonathan Sacks. Other clergy who have been made life peers, and thus sat in the House as Lords Temporal, included Donald Soper (created 1965), the first Methodist minister to be made a life peer; Anglican priest Timothy Beaumont (created a peer in 1967 and resigned holy orders in 1973); Archbishop of Armagh Robin Eames (the senior Anglican archbishop in Ireland) (created 1995); and Rabbi Julia Neuberger (created 2004).

Appointments of Catholic clergy to the Lords is unlikely, as since the promulgation of the 1983 Code of Canon Law, all Catholic clergy of the Latin Church have been discouraged from holding secular public office, and all diocesan priests and bishops have been completely prohibited from it (excepting only political offices of the Vatican City State).

Since the 1920s, retired archbishops of Canterbury (having reverted to the status of a regular bishop but no longer diocesans) were invariably given life peerages, allowing them to sit as Lords Temporal. However, it is unclear whether Justin Welby, who resigned the office in 2025 amid scandal, will be made a life peer.

By custom at least one of the archbishops or bishops reads prayers in each legislative day (a role taken by the chaplain in the Commons). They often speak in debates; in 2004 Rowan Williams, the Archbishop of Canterbury, opened a debate into sentencing legislation. Measures (proposed laws of the Church of England) must be put before the Lords, and the Lords Spiritual have a role in ensuring that this takes place.

=== Lords Temporal ===
==== Hereditary peers ====
Until 2026, a number of Lords Temporal received the right to sit and vote in the House of Lords by virtue of their noble descent, formally attached to their title reflecting the vast medieval fragmentation of the British Isles in feudal lordships. They, therefore, represented the nobility as a presumably less volatile counterweight to the House of Commons and as a representative of the third main group that were embedded within parliament.

Since the Dissolution of the Monasteries, the Lords Temporal have been the most numerous group in the House of Lords. Unlike the Lords Spiritual, they may be publicly partisan, aligning themselves with one or another of the political parties that dominate the House of Commons. Publicly non-partisan Lords are called crossbenchers. Originally, the Lords Temporal included several hundred hereditary peers (that is, those whose peerages may be inherited), who ranked variously as dukes, marquesses, earls, viscounts, and barons (as well as Scottish Lords of Parliament). Such hereditary dignities can be created by the Crown; in modern times this is done on the advice of the Prime Minister of the day (except in the case of members of the Royal Family).

Holders of Scottish and Irish peerages were not always permitted to sit in the Lords. When Scotland united with England to form Great Britain in 1707, it was provided that the Scottish hereditary peers would only be able to elect 16 Scottish representative peers to sit in the House of Lords; the term of a representative was to extend until the next general election. A similar provision was enacted when Ireland merged with Great Britain in 1801 to form the United Kingdom; the Irish peers were allowed to elect 28 Irish representative peers, who were to retain office for life. Elections for Irish representatives ended in 1922, when most of Ireland became an independent state known as the Irish Free State; elections for Scottish representatives ended with the passage of the Peerage Act 1963, under which all Scottish peers obtained seats in the Upper House.

In 1999, the Labour government brought forward the House of Lords Act removing the right of several hundred hereditary peers to sit in the House. The Act provided, as a measure intended to be temporary, that 92 people would continue to sit in the Lords by virtue of hereditary peerages. This arrangement ended in 2026, although hereditary peers can still sit in the House of Lords if they have been given a life peerage.

Of the 92, two remained in the House of Lords because they held royal offices connected with Parliament: the Earl Marshal and the Lord Great Chamberlain. Of the remaining ninety peers sitting in the Lords by virtue of a hereditary peerage, 15 were elected by the whole House and 75 were chosen by fellow hereditary peers in the House of Lords, grouped by party. However, a holder of a hereditary peerage who was given a life peerage became a member of the House of Lords without a need for a by-election. The exclusion of other hereditary peers removed Charles, then Prince of Wales (who was also Earl of Chester) and all other royal peers, including Prince Philip, Duke of Edinburgh; the then Prince Andrew, Duke of York; Prince Edward, then Earl of Wessex; Prince Richard, Duke of Gloucester; and Prince Edward, Duke of Kent.

The number of hereditary peers to be chosen by a political group reflected the proportion of hereditary peers that belonged to that group (see current composition below) in 1999. When an elected hereditary peer died, a by-election was held, with a variant of the Alternative Vote system being used. If the recently deceased hereditary peer had been elected by the whole House, then so was their replacement; a hereditary peer elected by a specific political group (including the non-aligned crossbenchers) was replaced by a vote of the hereditary peers already elected to the Lords belonging to that political group (whether elected by that group or by the whole house).

==== Lords of Appeal in Ordinary ====
Until 2009, the Lords Temporal also included the Lords of Appeal in Ordinary, more commonly known as Law Lords, a group of individuals appointed to the House of Lords so that they could exercise its judicial functions. Lords of Appeal in Ordinary were first appointed under the Appellate Jurisdiction Act 1876. They were selected by the Prime Minister of the day, but were formally appointed by the Sovereign. A Lord of Appeal in Ordinary had to retire at the age of 70, or, if his term was extended by the government, at the age of 75; after reaching such an age, the Law Lord could not hear any further cases in the House of Lords.

The number of Lords of Appeal in Ordinary (excluding those who were no longer able to hear cases because of age restrictions) was limited to twelve, but could be changed by statutory instrument. By a convention of the House, Lords of Appeal in Ordinary did not take part in debates on new legislation, so as to maintain judicial independence. Lords of Appeal in Ordinary held their seats in the House of Lords for life, remaining as members even after reaching the judicial retirement age of 70 or 75. Former Lord Chancellors and holders of other high judicial office could also sit as Law Lords under the Appellate Jurisdiction Act, although in practice this right was only rarely exercised.

Under the Constitutional Reform Act 2005, the Lords of Appeal in Ordinary when the Act came into effect in 2009 became judges of the new Supreme Court of the United Kingdom and were then barred from sitting or voting in the House of Lords until they had retired as judges. One of the main justifications for the new Supreme Court was to establish a separation of powers between the judiciary and the legislature. It is therefore unlikely that future appointees to the Supreme Court of the United Kingdom will be made Lords of Appeal in Ordinary.

==== Life peers ====
The largest group of Lords Temporal, and indeed of the whole House, are life peers. As of March 2024, there are 670 life peers eligible to vote in the House. Life peers rank only as barons or baronesses, and are created under the Life Peerages Act 1958. Like all other peers, life peers are created by the Sovereign, who acts on the advice of the Prime Minister or the House of Lords Appointments Commission. By convention, however, the Prime Minister allows leaders of other parties to nominate some life peers, so as to maintain a political balance in the House of Lords. Moreover, some non-party life peers (the number being determined by the Prime Minister) are nominated by the independent House of Lords Appointments Commission.

In 2000 the government announced that it would set up an Independent Appointments Commission, under Dennis Stevenson, Lord Stevenson of Coddenham, to select fifteen so-called "people's peers" for life peerages. However, when the choices were announced in April 2001, from a list of 3,000 applicants, the choices were treated with criticism in the media, as all were distinguished in their field, and none were "ordinary people" as some had originally hoped.

=== Qualifications ===
Several different qualifications apply for membership of the House of Lords. No person may sit in the House of Lords if under the age of 21. Furthermore, only United Kingdom, Irish and Commonwealth citizens may sit in the House of Lords. The nationality restrictions were previously more stringent: under the Act of Settlement 1701, and prior to the British Nationality Act 1948, only natural-born subjects qualified.

Additionally, some bankruptcy-related restrictions apply to members of the Upper House. Subjects of a Bankruptcy Restrictions Order (applicable in England and Wales only), adjudged bankrupt (in Northern Ireland), or a sequestered estate (in Scotland) are not eligible to sit in the House of Lords. Individuals convicted of high treason are prohibited from sitting in the House of Lords until completion of their full term of imprisonment. An exception applies, however, if the individual convicted of high treason receives a full pardon. An individual serving a prison sentence for an offence other than high treason is not automatically disqualified.

Women were excluded from the House of Lords until the Life Peerages Act 1958, passed to address the declining number of active members, made possible the creation of peerages for life (which expire on the death of the holder, as opposed to hereditary peerages). Women were immediately eligible and four were among the first life peers appointed. However, female hereditary peers continued to be excluded until the passage of the Peerage Act 1963. Since the passage of the House of Lords Act 1999, female hereditary peers remain eligible for election to the Upper House; until her resignation on 1 May 2020, there was one (Margaret of Mar, 31st Countess of Mar) among the 90 hereditary peers who continue to sit. After Barbara Wootton became one of the first four life peers appointed under the Life Peerages Act 1958, she requested that she not be referred to as "peeress", believing that the term failed to distinguish female peers from the mere wives of peers.

==== Cash for peerages ====
The Honours (Prevention of Abuses) Act 1925 made it illegal for a peerage, or other honour, to be bought or sold. Nonetheless, there have been repeated allegations that life peerages (and thus membership of the House of Lords) have been made available to major political donors in exchange for donations. The most prominent example, the Cash for Honours scandal in 2006, saw a police investigation, with no charges being brought. A 2015 study found that of 303 people nominated for peerages in the period 2005–2014, a total of 211 were former senior figures within politics (including former MPs), or were non-political appointments. Of the remaining 92 political appointments from outside public life, 27 had made significant donations to political parties. The authors concluded firstly that nominees from outside public life were much more likely to have made large gifts than peers nominated after prior political or public service. They also found that significant donors to parties were far more likely to be nominated for peerages than other party members.

=== Removal from House membership ===
Traditionally there was no mechanism by which members could resign or be removed from the House of Lords (compare the situation as regards resignation from the House of Commons). The Peerage Act 1963 permitted a person to disclaim their newly inherited peerage (within certain time limits); this meant that such a person could effectively renounce their membership of the Lords. This might be done in order to remain or become qualified to sit in the House of Commons, as in the case of Tony Benn (formerly the second Viscount Stansgate), who had campaigned for such a change.

The House of Lords Reform Act 2014 made provision for members' resignation from the House, removal for non-attendance, and automatic expulsion upon conviction for a serious criminal offence (if resulting in a jail sentence of at least one year). In June 2015, under the House of Lords (Expulsion and Suspension) Act 2015, the House's Standing Orders may provide for the expulsion or suspension of a member upon a resolution of the House.

In November 2020, Nazir Ahmed, Lord Ahmed retired from the House of Lords, having seen a Lords Conduct Committee report recommending he be expelled. In December the same year, Lord Maginnis was suspended from the House for 18 months.

== Officers ==
Traditionally the House of Lords did not elect its own speaker, unlike the House of Commons; rather, the ex officio presiding officer was the Lord Chancellor. With the passage of the Constitutional Reform Act 2005, the post of Lord Speaker was created, a position to which a peer is elected by the House and subsequently appointed by the Crown. The first Lord Speaker, elected on 4 May 2006, was Helene Hayman, Baroness Hayman, a former Labour peer. As the Speaker is expected to be an impartial presiding officer, Hayman resigned from the Labour Party. In 2011, Frances D'Souza, Baroness D'Souza was elected as the second Lord Speaker, replacing Hayman in September 2011. D'Souza was in turn succeeded by Norman Fowler, Lord Fowler in September 2016, who served as Lord Speaker until his resignation in April 2021. He was succeeded as Lord Speaker by John McFall, Lord McFall of Alcluith, who served until his resignation in 2026. McFall was succeeded in February 2026 by Michael Forsyth, Lord Forsyth of Drumlean, who is the incumbent Lord Speaker.

This reform of the post of Lord Chancellor was made due to the perceived constitutional anomalies inherent in the role. The Lord Chancellor was not only the Speaker of the House of Lords, but also a member of the Cabinet, and the most senior judge in England and Wales; his or her department, formerly the Lord Chancellor's Department, is now called the Ministry of Justice. The Lord Chancellor is no longer the head of the judiciary of England and Wales. Hitherto, the Lord Chancellor was part of all three branches of government: the legislative, the executive, and the judicial. The only other person in such a position is the monarch, as the formal source of all executive authority, the King-in-Parliament who grants royal assent to laws, and appointer of judges; but whereas the monarch's actions are strictly limited by convention, the Lord Chancellor's were not, a situation which offended against the principle of separation of powers.

The overlap of the legislative and executive roles is a characteristic of the Westminster system, as the entire cabinet consists of members of the House of Commons or the House of Lords; however, in June 2003, the Blair Government announced its intention to abolish the post of Lord Chancellor because of the office's mixed executive and judicial responsibilities. The abolition of the office was rejected by the House of Lords, and the Constitutional Reform Act 2005 was thus amended to preserve the office of Lord Chancellor. The Act no longer guarantees that the office holder of Lord Chancellor is the presiding officer of the House of Lords, and therefore allows the House of Lords to elect a speaker of their own.

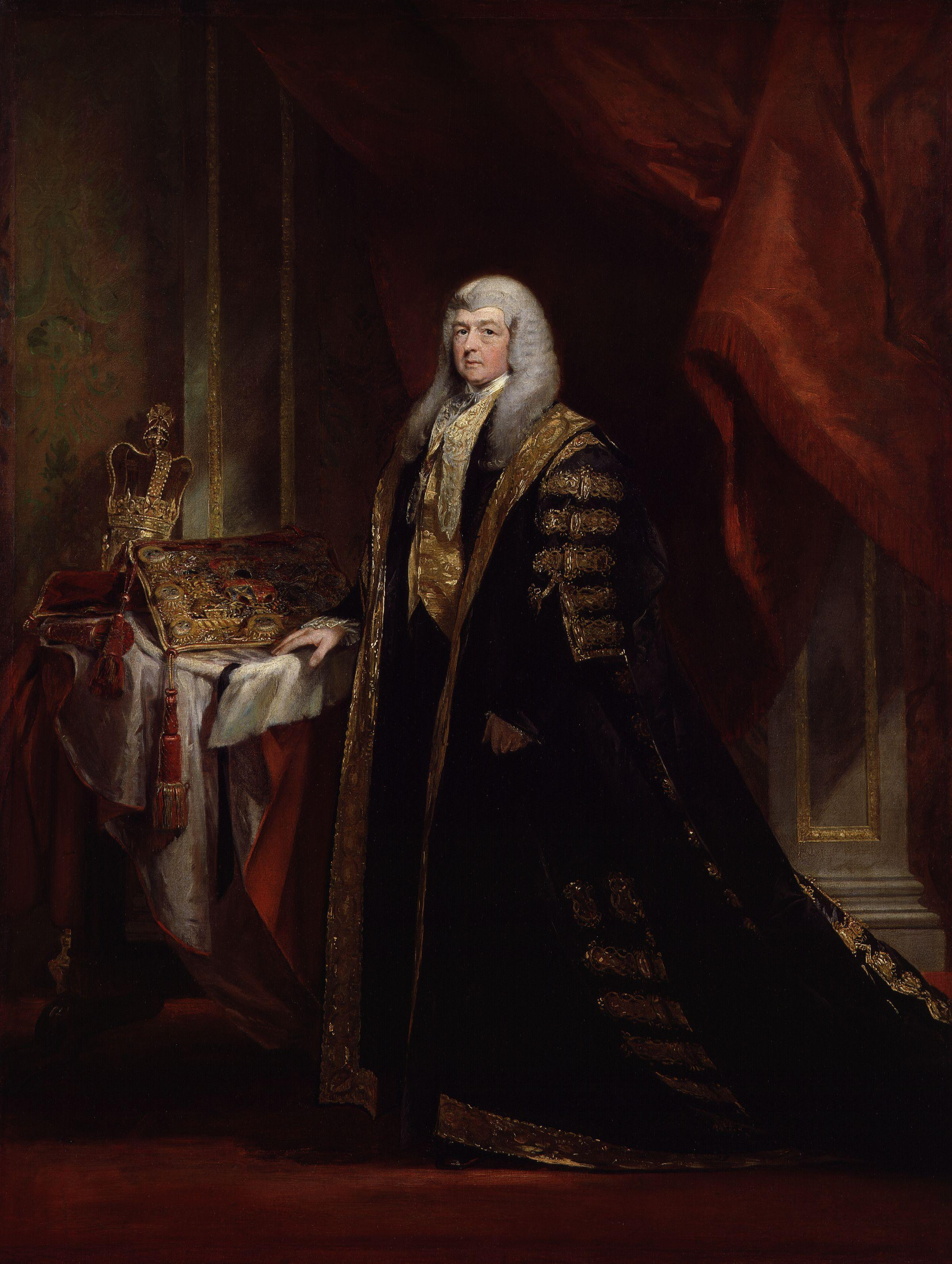
Charles Pepys as Lord Chancellor. The lord chancellor wore black-and-gold robes whilst presiding over the House of Lords.

The lord speaker may be replaced as presiding officer by one of his or her deputies. The chairman of committees, the principal deputy chairman of committees, and several chairmen are all deputies to the lord speaker, and are all appointed by the House of Lords itself at the beginning of each session. By custom, the Crown appoints each chairman, principal deputy chairman and deputy chairman to the additional office of Deputy Speaker of the House of Lords. There was previously no legal requirement that the lord chancellor or a deputy speaker be a member of the House of Lords (though the same has long been customary).

Whilst presiding over the House of Lords, the lord chancellor traditionally wore ceremonial black and gold robes. Robes of black and gold are now worn by the lord chancellor and Secretary of State for Justice in the House of Commons, on ceremonial occasions. This is no longer a requirement for the lord speaker except for state occasions outside of the chamber. The speaker or deputy speaker sits on the Woolsack, a large red seat stuffed with wool, at the front of the Lords Chamber.

When the House of Lords resolves itself into committee (see below), the Chairman of Committees or a Deputy Chairman of Committees presides, not from the Woolsack, but from a chair at the Table of the House. The presiding officer has little power compared to the Speaker of the House of Commons. The presiding officer only acts as the mouthpiece of the House, performing duties such as announcing the results of votes. This is because, unlike in the House of Commons where all statements are directed to "Mr/Madam Speaker", in the House of Lords they are directed to "My Lords"; i.e., the entire body of the House.

The Lord Speaker or Deputy Speaker cannot determine which members may speak, or discipline members for violating the rules of the House; these measures may be taken only by the House itself. Unlike the politically neutral Speaker of the House of Commons, the Lord Chancellor and Deputy Speakers originally remained members of their respective parties, and were permitted to participate in debate; however, this is no longer true of the new role of Lord Speaker.

Another officer of the body is the Leader of the House of Lords, a peer selected by the Prime Minister. The Leader of the House is responsible for steering Government bills through the House of Lords, and is a member of the Cabinet. The Leader also advises the House on proper procedure when necessary, but such advice is merely informal, rather than official and binding. A Deputy Leader is also appointed by the Prime Minister, and takes the place of an absent or unavailable leader.

The Clerk of the Parliaments is the chief clerk and officer of the House of Lords (but is not a member of the House itself). The Clerk, who is appointed by the Crown, advises the presiding officer on the rules of the House, signs orders and official communications, endorses bills, and is the keeper of the official records of both Houses of Parliament. Moreover, the Clerk of the Parliaments is responsible for arranging by-elections of hereditary peers when necessary. The deputies of the Clerk of the Parliaments (the Clerk Assistant and the Reading Clerk) are appointed by the Lord Speaker, subject to the House's approval.

The Gentleman or Lady Usher of the Black Rod is also an officer of the House; they take their title from the symbol of their office, a black rod. Black Rod (as the Gentleman/Lady Usher is normally known) is responsible for ceremonial arrangements, is in charge of the House's doorkeepers, and may (upon the order of the House) take action to end disorder or disturbance in the Chamber. Black Rod also holds the office of Serjeant-at-Arms of the House of Lords, and in this capacity attends upon the Lord Speaker. The Gentleman or Lady Usher of the Black Rod's duties may be delegated to the Yeoman Usher of the Black Rod or to the Assistant Serjeant-at-Arms.

== Procedure ==
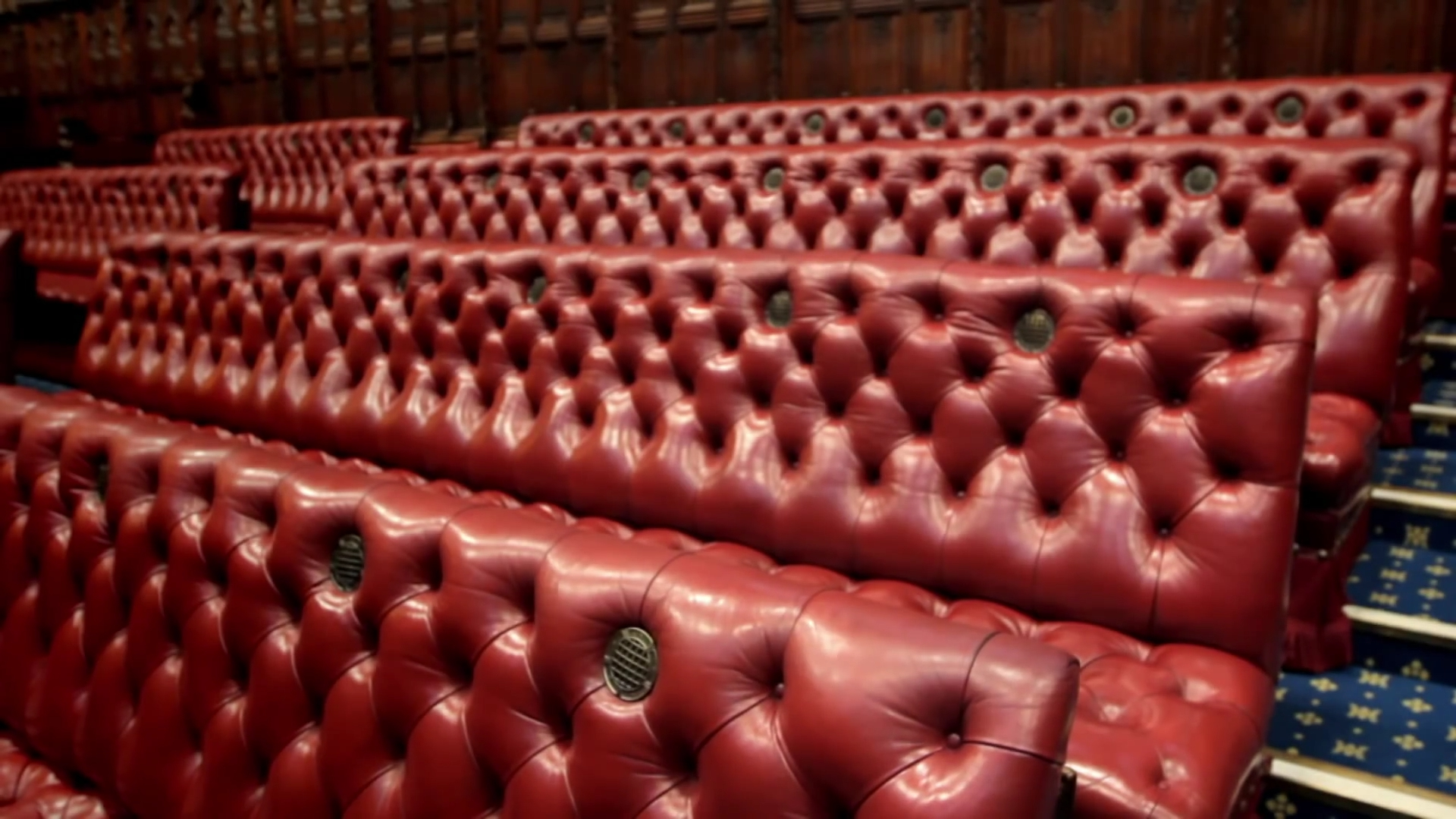
Benches in the chamber are coloured red. In contrast, the benches in the House of Commons are green.

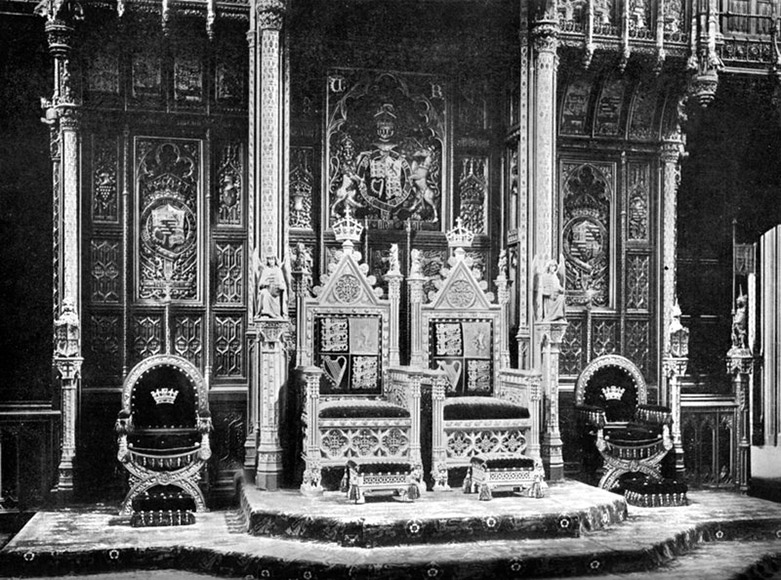
The royal thrones, c. 1902. The Sovereign's throne (on left) is raised slightly higher than the consort's.

The House of Lords and the House of Commons assemble in the Palace of Westminster. The Lords Chamber is lavishly decorated, in contrast with the more modestly furnished Commons Chamber. Benches in the Lords Chamber are coloured red. The Woolsack is at the front of the Chamber; the Government sit on benches on the right of the Woolsack, while members of the Opposition sit on the left. Crossbenchers sit on the benches immediately opposite the Woolsack.

The Lords Chamber is the site of many formal ceremonies, the most famous of which is the State Opening of Parliament, held at the beginning of each new parliamentary session. During the State Opening, the Sovereign, seated on the Throne in the Lords Chamber and in the presence of both Houses of Parliament, delivers a speech outlining the Government's agenda for the upcoming parliamentary session.

In the House of Lords, members need not seek the recognition of the presiding officer before speaking, as is done in the House of Commons. If two or more Lords simultaneously rise to speak, the House decides which one is to be heard by acclamation, or, if necessary, by voting on a motion. Often, however, the Leader of the House will suggest an order, which is thereafter generally followed. Speeches in the House of Lords are addressed to the House as a whole ("My Lords") rather than to the presiding officer alone (as is the custom in the Lower House). Members may not refer to each other in the second person (as "you"), but rather use third person forms such as "the noble Duke", "the noble Earl", "the noble Lord", "my noble friend", "The most Reverend Primate", etc.

Each member may make no more than one speech on a motion, except that the mover of the motion may make one speech at the beginning of the debate and another at the end. Speeches are not subject to any time limits in the House; however, the House may put an end to a speech by approving a motion "that the noble Lord be no longer heard". It is also possible for the House to end the debate entirely, by approving a motion "that the Question be now put". This procedure is known as Closure, and is extremely rare. Six closure motions were passed on 4 April 2019 to significant media attention as part of consideration of a private member's bill concerning the United Kingdom's withdrawal from the European Union.

Once all speeches on a motion have concluded, or Closure invoked, the motion may be put to a vote. The House first votes by voice vote; the Lord Speaker or Deputy Speaker puts the question, and the Lords respond either "content" (in favour of the motion) or "not content" (against the motion). The presiding officer then announces the result of the voice vote, but if his assessment is challenged by any Lord, a recorded vote known as a division follows.

Members of the House enter one of two lobbies (the content lobby or the not-content lobby) on either side of the Chamber, where their names are recorded by clerks. At each lobby are two Tellers (themselves members of the House) who count the votes of the Lords. The Lord Speaker may not take part in the vote. Once the division concludes, the Tellers provide the results thereof to the presiding officer, who then announces them to the House.

If there is an equality of votes, the motion is decided according to the following principles: legislation may proceed in its present form, unless there is a majority in favour of amending or rejecting it; any other motions are rejected, unless there is a majority in favour of approving it. The quorum of the House of Lords is just three members for a general or procedural vote, and 30 members for a vote on legislation. If fewer than three or 30 members (as appropriate) are present, the division is invalid.

Special arrangements were made during the 2020 COVID-19 pandemic to allow some duties to be carried out online.

=== Disciplinary powers ===
By contrast with the House of Commons, the House of Lords has not until recently had an established procedure for imposing sanctions on its members. When a cash for influence scandal was referred to the Committee of Privileges in January 2009, the Leader of the House of Lords also asked the Privileges Committee to report on what sanctions the House had against its members. After seeking advice from the Attorney General for England and Wales and the former Lord Chancellor James Mackay, Lord Mackay of Clashfern, the committee decided that the House "possessed an inherent power" to suspend errant members, although not to withhold a writ of summons nor to expel a member permanently. When the House subsequently suspended Peter Truscott, Lord Truscott and Tom Taylor, Lord Taylor of Blackburn for their role in the scandal, they were the first to meet this fate since 1642.

Recent changes have expanded the disciplinary powers of the House. Section 3 of the House of Lords Reform Act 2014 now provides that any member of the House of Lords convicted of a crime and sentenced to imprisonment for more than one year loses their seat. The House of Lords (Expulsion and Suspension) Act 2015 allows the House to set up procedures to suspend, and to expel, its members.

==== Regulation of behaviour in the chamber ====
There are two motions which have grown up through custom and practice and which govern questionable conduct within the House. They are brought into play by a member standing up, possibly intervening on another member, and moving the motion without notice. When the debate is getting excessively heated, it is open to a member to move "that the Standing Order on Asperity of Speech be read by the Clerk". The motion can be debated, but if agreed by the House, the Clerk of the Parliaments will read Standing Order 32 which provides "That all personal, sharp, or taxing speeches be forborn". The Journals of the House of Lords record only four instances on which the House has ordered the Standing Order to be read since the procedure was invented in 1871.

For more serious problems with an individual Lord, the option is available to move "That the noble Lord be no longer heard". This motion also is debatable, and the debate which ensues has sometimes offered a chance for the member whose conduct has brought it about to come to order so that the motion can be withdrawn. If the motion is passed, its effect is to prevent the member from continuing their speech on the motion then under debate. The Journals identify eleven occasions on which this motion has been moved since 1884; four were eventually withdrawn, one was voted down, and six were passed.

=== Leave of absence ===
In 1958, to counter criticism that some peers only appeared at major decisions in the House and thereby particular votes were swayed, the Standing Orders of the House of Lords were enhanced. Peers who did not wish to attend meetings regularly or were prevented by ill health, age or further reasons, were now able to request leave of absence. During the granted time a peer is expected not to visit the House's meetings until either its expiration or termination, announced at least a month prior to their return.

=== Attendance allowance ===
Via a new financial support system introduced in 2010, members of the House of Lords can opt to receive an attendance allowance per sitting day of currently £342 (as of 2023; initially it was £300 in 2010), plus limited travel expenses. Nonsalaried peers can choose to receive a reduced attendance allowance of £171 per day instead, or none at all. Peers with a residence registered outside of London can also receive reimbursement for travel expenses.

== Committees ==
Unlike in the House of Commons, when the term committee is used to describe a stage of a bill, this committee does not take the form of a public bill committee, but what is described as Committee of the Whole House. It is made up of all members of the House of Lords, where any member is allowed to contribute to debates and provides for flexible rules of procedure. It is presided over by the Chairman of Committees.

The term committee is also used to describe Grand Committee, where the same rules of procedure apply as in the main chamber, except that no divisions may take place. For this reason, business that is discussed in Grand Committee is usually uncontroversial and likely to be agreed unanimously.

Public bills may also be committed to pre-legislative committees. A pre-legislative Committee is specifically constituted for a particular bill. These committees are established in advance of the bill being laid before either the House of Lords or the House of Commons and can take evidence from the public. Such committees are rare and do not replace any of the usual stages of a bill, including committee stage.

The House of Lords also has 15 Select committees. Typically, these are sessional committees, meaning that their members are appointed by the House at the beginning of each session, and continue to serve until the next parliamentary session begins. In practice, these are often permanent committees, which are re-established during every session. These committees are typically empowered to make reports to the House "from time to time", that is, whenever they wish. Other committees are ad-hoc committees, which are set up to investigate a specific issue. When they are set up by a motion in the House, the motion will set a deadline by which the Committee must report. After this date, the committee will cease to exist unless it is granted an extension. One example of this is the Committee on Public Service and Demographic Change. The House of Lords may appoint a chairman for a committee; if it does not do so, the Chairman of Committees or a Deputy Chairman of Committees may preside instead. Most of the Select Committees are also granted the power to co-opt members, such as the European Union Committee. The primary function of Select Committees is to scrutinise and investigate Government activities; to fulfil these aims, they are permitted to hold hearings and collect evidence. Bills may be referred to Select Committees, but are more often sent to the Committee of the Whole House and Grand Committees.

The committee system of the House of Lords also includes several Domestic Committees, which supervise or consider the House's procedures and administration. One of the Domestic Committees is the Committee of Selection, which is responsible for assigning members to many of the House's other committees.

== Composition ==
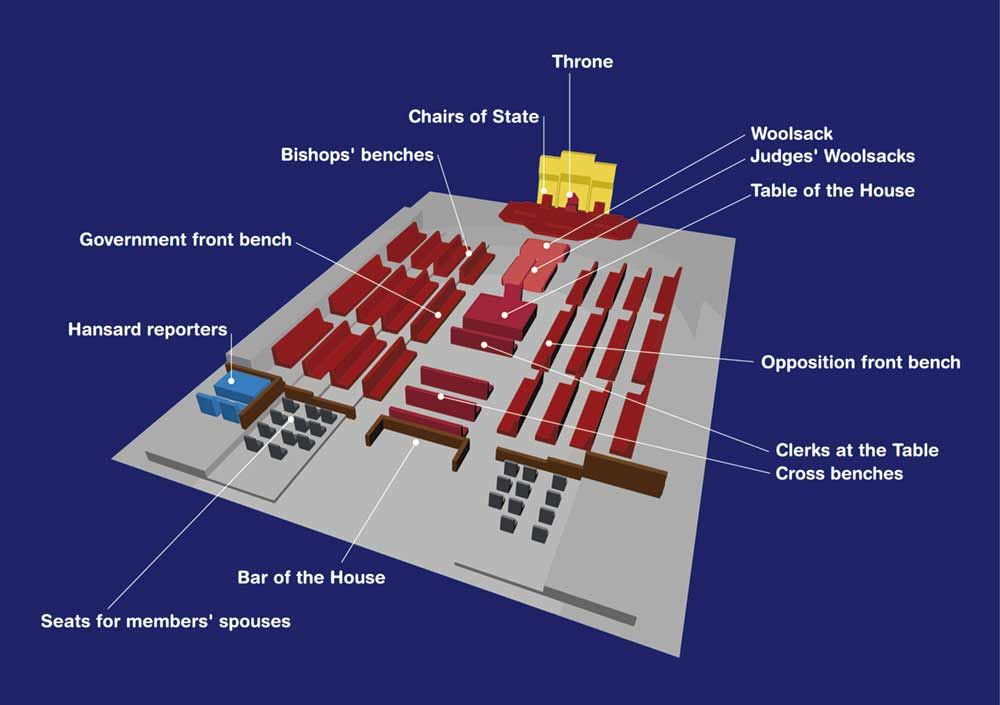

As of May 2026 there are 796 sitting members of the House of Lords, of whom 667 were life peers as of 2 October 2023, and 228 were women (see:Women in the House of Lords). An additional 19 lords are ineligible to participate, including two peers who are constitutionally disqualified as members of the judiciary.

From 1999 until the removal of the remaining hereditary peers in 2026, the House of Lords Act 1999 allocated 75 of the 92 hereditary peers to the parties based on the proportion of hereditary peers that belonged to that party in 1999:

- Conservative Party: 42 peers
- Labour Party: 2 peers
- Liberal Democrats: 3 peers
- Crossbenchers: 28 peers

Of the initial 42 hereditary peers elected as Conservatives, one, David Verney, 21st Lord Willoughby de Broke, defected to UKIP, though he left the party in 2018.

Fifteen hereditary peers were elected by the whole House, and the remaining hereditary peers were the two royal office-holders, the Earl Marshal and the Lord Great Chamberlain.

A report in 2007 stated that many members of the Lords (particularly the life peers) do not attend regularly; the average daily attendance was around 408.

The number of Lords Spiritual is limited to 26, but there is no maximum limit to the number of life peers who may be members of the House of Lords at any time.

=== Gender imbalance ===
Although female representation in the Lords has risen each decade since 1960, the pace has slowed in recent years, with the number of women peers rising 1% since 2020. A report by the Unlock Democracy think tank found that if every woman ever made a peer was still alive and sitting in the House of Lords today, men would still outnumber women by nearly two to one. The report singled out Rishi Sunak's female appointment rates to the House of Lords, at 17% of his party's appointments as compared with 37.5% of Tory peers appointed under Truss, 20.9% by appointed under Johnson, 46.2% under May, and 30% under Cameron; the report also states that appointment rates under Labour were scarcely higher.

== Government leaders and ministers in the Lords ==
=== Leaders and chief whips ===
- The Baroness Smith of Basildon – Leader of the House of Lords and Lord Keeper of the Privy Seal (Cabinet member)
- The Lord Collins of Highbury – Deputy Leader of the House of Lords (unpaid)
- The Lord Kennedy of Southwark – Chief Whip of the House of Lords and Captain of the Honourable Corps of Gentlemen-at-Arms
- The Baroness Anderson of Stoke-on-Trent – Deputy Chief Whip of the House of Lords and Captain of the King's Bodyguard of the Yeomen of the Guard

=== Other ministers ===
- Law officers of the Crown

- The Baroness Smith of Cluny – Advocate General for Scotland

- Ministry of Defence

- The Lord Coaker – Minister of State for Defence

- Department for Education

- The Baroness Smith of Malvern – Minister of State for Skills

- Home Office

- The Lord Hanson of Flint – Minister of State for the Home Office
- The Lord Collins of Highbury – Parliamentary Under-Secretary of State

- Department for Transport

- The Lord Hendy of Richmond Hill – Minister of State for Rail

- Department for Work and Pensions

- The Baroness Smith of Malvern – Minister of State for Skills
- The Baroness Sherlock – Minister of State for Work and Pensions

- Department for Business, Innovation, Science and Trade

- The Lord Sarwar – Minister of State for Trade
- The Baroness Lloyd of Effra – Parliamentary Under-Secretary of State for Space, Cyber and Regulatory Reform
- The Lord Leong – Parliamentary Under-Secretary of State for Small Business and Enterprise

- Foreign, Commonwealth and Development Office

- The Lord Wood of Anfield – Parliamentary Under-Secretary of State for Europe
- The Baroness Winterton of Doncaster – Parliamentary Under-Secretary of State for Indo-Pacific

- Department for Energy Security and Net Zero

- The Baroness Curran – Parliamentary Under-Secretary of State for Energy Security and Net Zero

- Ministry of Justice

- The Lord Lemos – Parliamentary Under-Secretary of State for Justice and Lords Minister

- HM Treasury

- The Lord Pitt-Watson – Parliamentary Secretary for the Treasury

- Cabinet Office

- The Baroness Twycross – Parliamentary Secretary for the Cabinet Office

- Northern Ireland Office

- Baroness Anderson of Stoke-on-Trent – Parliamentary Under-Secretary of State for Northern Ireland

- Department of Health and Social Care

- The Baroness Merron – Parliamentary Under-Secretary of State for Women's Health and Mental Health

- Department for Culture, Media and Sport

- The Baroness Twycross – Parliamentary Under-Secretary of State for Museums, Heritage and Gambling

- The Baroness Lloyd of Effra – Parliamentary Under-Secretary of State for Digital Economy
- The Baroness Mackenzie of Sherwood – Parliamentary Under-Secretary of State
- Department for Environment, Food and Rural Affairs

- The Baroness Baroness Hayman of Ullock – Parliamentary Under-Secretary of State for Biosecurity, Borders and Animals

- Ministry of Housing, Communities and Local Government

- The Baroness Taylor of Stevenage – Parliamentary Under-Secretary of State for Housing and Local Government
- The Baroness Blake of Leeds – Parliamentary Under-Secretary of State
- The Lord Collins of Highbury – Parliamentary Under-Secretary of State for Equalities

== Criticisms ==
There are several criticisms of the House of Lords, including:

- The appointments process, which has often been described as unprincipled and questionable. Both the Labour Party and the Conservative Party regularly appoint people in exchange for money.
- Peers all enjoy lifetime job security. They are allowed to hold their seats until death.
- The makeup of the Lords does not reflect the social and demographic diversity of the UK, with under-representation of ethnic minorities and women.
- The United Kingdom is one of the few countries in the world to award religious figures a permanent seat in the legislature.
- Unlike the French Senate, which equally represents all French regions, the House of Lords has an over-representation of people from southern England. The North West and East and West Midlands are underrepresented regions.
- The House of Lords is often criticized for being too large. With almost 800 members, it is the second-largest legislative house in the world, only after the National People's Congress of China. The physical capacity of the building is only about 400 seats, which has led to "jostling for space".

These criticisms have led some to question whether there is a need for a second house at all, and whether the bicameral system in British politics is still useful. Many nations such as Denmark, Finland, Greece, Iceland, New Zealand, Norway, Portugal and Sweden are unicameral.

== See also ==
- Gunpowder Plot
- Constitution Committee
- History of reform of the House of Lords
- History of the constitution of the United Kingdom
- House of Lords Library
- Introduction (House of Lords) ceremony
- Lord-in-waiting
- List of acts of the Parliament of the United Kingdom enacted without the House of Lords' consent
- Parliament in the Making
- Parliamentary Archives
- Reform of the House of Lords
- Proposed relocation of the Parliament of the United Kingdom

=== Overseas counterparts ===
==== Extant ====
- House of Ariki of the Cook Islands
- House of Elders (Somaliland)
- Dewan Negara (Malaysia)
- Senate of Canada, modeled after the House of Lords and composed of 105 appointed senators.
- Senate (Lesotho), composed of 22 hereditary tribal chiefs and 11 King's nominees
- Senate of Zimbabwe, with 18 of 80 seats reserved for tribal chiefs

==== Defunct ====
- Irish House of Lords (existed 1297–1800)
- New Zealand Legislative Council
- Chamber of Peers (France)
- Chamber of Most Worthy Peers (Portugal)
- Chamber of Peers (Spain)
- Chamber of Princes (British India)
- House of Peers (Japan)
  - Genrōin (Japan)
- Prussian House of Lords
- House of Lords (Austria)
- Senate of the Kingdom of Italy

== Bibliography ==
- Ballinger, Chris. The House of Lords 1911–2011: A Century of Non-reform (Bloomsbury, 2014).
- Carroll, Alex (2007). Constitutional and Administrative Law (4th ed.). Pearson Longman. ISBN 978-1-4058-1231-3.
- Close, David H. "The Collapse of Resistance to Democracy: Conservatives, Adult Suffrage, and Second Chamber Reform, 1911–1928." Historical Journal 20.4 (1977): 893–918. online
- Dorey, Peter, and Alexandra Kelso. House of Lords reform since 1911: Must the Lords go? (Springer, 2011).
- Hayter, Paul (2007). Companion to the Standing Orders and guide to the Proceedings of the House of Lords (21st ed.). Her Majesty's Stationery Office. Archived from the original on 19 December 2005.
- Jones, Clyve, and David L. Jones, eds. Peers, Politics and Power: House of Lords, 1603–1911 (A&C Black, 1986).
- Jones, Harry (1912). Liberalism and the House of Lords: The Story of the Veto Battle, 1832–1911. London: Methuen.
- Jones, Bill; Kavanagh, Dennis; Moran, Michael; Norton, Philip (2007). Politics UK (6th ed.). Pearson Education. ISBN 978-1-4058-2411-8.
- Loveland, Ian (2009). Constitutional Law, Administrative Law and Human Rights (5th ed.). Oxford University Press. ISBN 978-0-19-921974-2.
- Mell, Andrew; Radford, Simon; Thevoz, Seth Alexander (2015). Is there a market for peerages? Archived 2 April 2015 at the Wayback Machine Oxford University Department of Economics discussion paper, No.744
- Norton, Philip. Reform of the House of Lords (Manchester UP, 2020).
- Radford, Simon; Mell, Andrew; Thevoz, Seth Alexander (2019). "'Lordy Me!' Can donations buy you a British peerage? A study in the link between party political funding and peerage nominations, 2005–2014", British Politics.
- Russell, Meg. The contemporary House of Lords: Westminster bicameralism revived (Oxford UP, 2013).
- Shell, Donald (2007). The House of Lords (3rd ed.). Manchester University Press. ISBN 978-0-7190-5443-3.
- Smith, Ernest Anthony. The House of Lords in British politics and society, 1815–1911 (Longman, 1992).
- Smith, Philip Vernon (1884). The House of Lords and the Nation (2nd ed.). London: ENGLAND OFFICE.
