= Root and Branch petition =

1640 petition to the English Parliament

Root and Branch Bill
- Bill
- Parliament of England
- Introduced by: Henry Vane and Oliver Cromwell (Commons)
- Territorial extent: England and Wales

Dates
- Made: February 1641
- Laid before Parliament: May 1641

Other legislation
- Relates to: Clergy Act 1640

Status: Not passed

Text of statute as originally enacted

The Root and Branch Petition was a petition presented to the Long Parliament on 11 December 1640. The petition had been signed by 15,000 Londoners and was presented to the English Parliament by a crowd of 1,500. The petition called on Parliament to abolish episcopacy from the 'roots' and in all its 'branches'.

== Debate ==
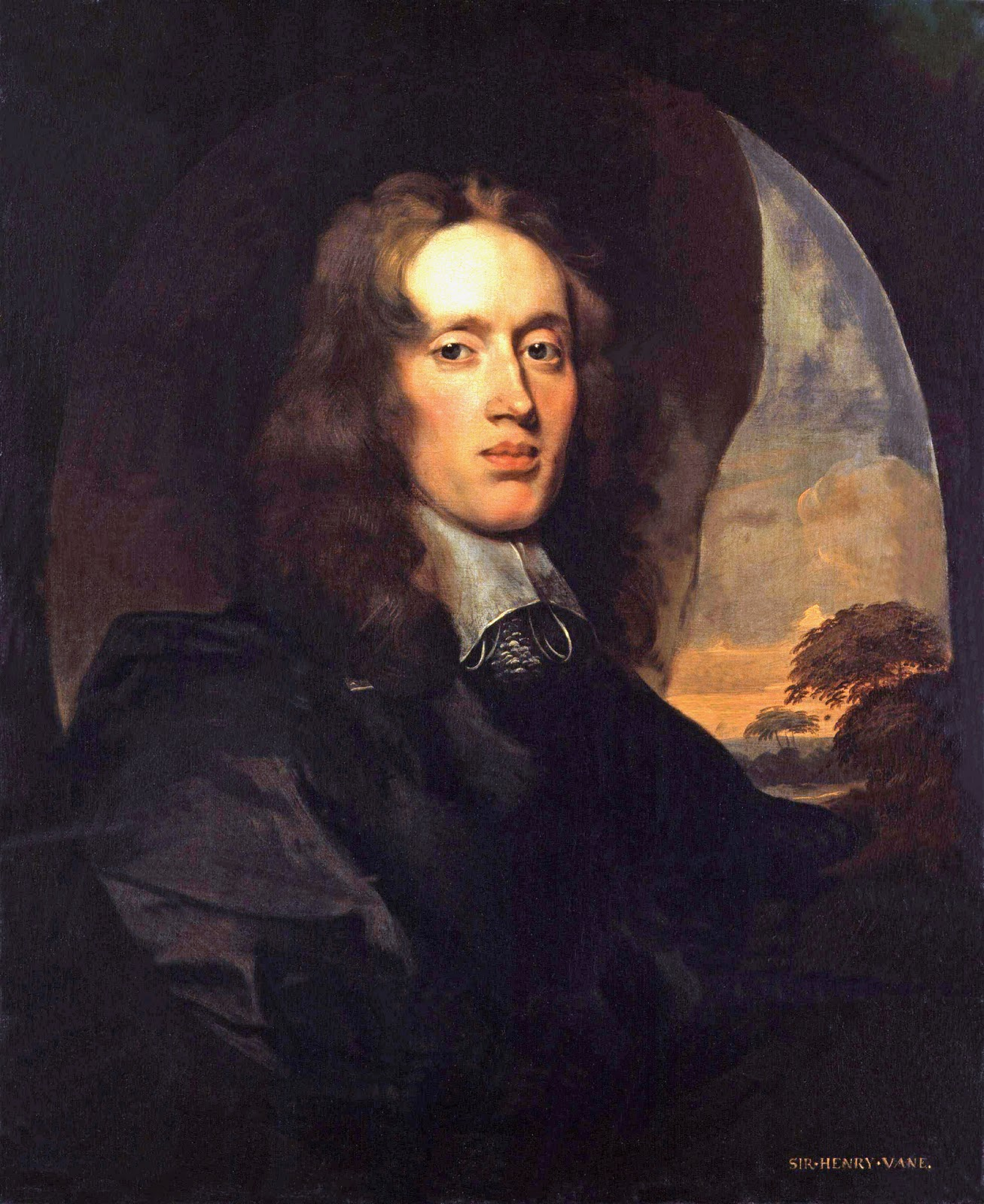
Henry Vane, one of the chief proponents of the Root and Branch Bill.

When the petition was debated in the House of Commons, the call for radical reforms in the Church of England was supported by Henry Vane and Nathaniel Fiennes, among others. Vane came to the front of the anti-episcopal faction, claiming that episcopacy was a corrupt doctrine "hastening us back again to Rome", while Fiennes argued that the episcopacy constituted a political and religious danger to English society. The House of Commons was reluctant to act on the Root and Branch Petition, though it did ultimately refer the petition to committee in February 1641, with Vane and Fiennes being added to the committee.

This petition formed the basis of the Root and Branch Bill, which was drawn up by Oliver St John and introduced in Parliament by Henry Vane and Oliver Cromwell in May 1641.

The first reading of the bill was moved by Edward Dering, not because he agreed with it, but because he thought the radical idea of abolishing the episcopacy would force the passage of the more moderate Clergy Act. He went on to oppose the bill while it was in committee, defending the idea of a "primitive episcopacy", which would bring bishops into line with the rest of the clergy. In one speech in the House of Commons, Dering was quoted as saying:

"Parity of degrees in Church Government hath no foundation in holy scripture, and is as treasonous to reason as parity in a state or family. Indeed it is a fancy, a dream, a mere non-entity; it neither hath nor never had a being. If it be any thing, it is absolute Anarchism, and that is nothing; for privation of government is not a government."

The bitter debates that the Commons held on the bill eventually resulted in the indication of parliamentary support for church reform. As a result, mobs started to invade churches, removing "scandalous images" and any other "signs of popery". After lengthy debates, the bill was eventually defeated in August 1641, dying without a vote as more critical matters began to occupy Parliament.

== Aftermath ==
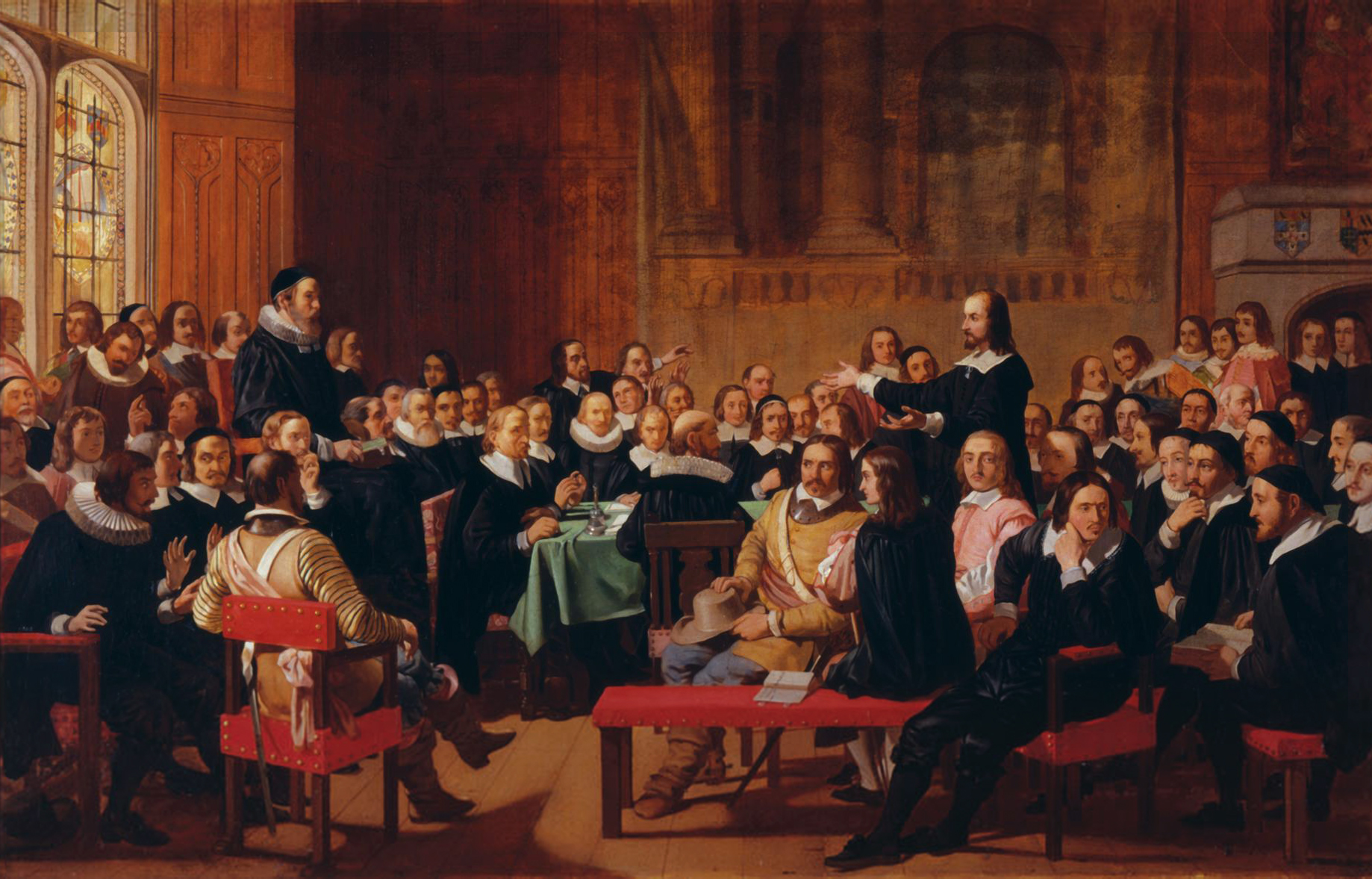
19th century depiction of the Westminster Assembly of Divines.

In early 1641, the Commons attempted to pass a series of constitutional measures, but the bishops ensured they were rejected by the House of Lords. The Commons responded by introducing the Bishops Exclusion Bill (later known as the Clergy Act 1640), which would remove them from the House of Lords, but this was also rejected. In December 1641, riots erupted throughout Westminster, which resulted in a number of deaths and prevented the bishops from attending the House of Lords. In January 1642, Charles I fled London, accompanied by many Royalist MPs and Lords; this gave the anti-episcopal faction a majority in both houses, and the bill became law in February 1642.

These heightened tensions led to the outbreak of the First English Civil War in August 1642, in which many of the anti-episcopal faction joined the Parliamentarian side, while their opponents joined the Royalists. On 12 June 1643, the Parliamentarians convened the Westminster Assembly in order to formally restructure the Church of England.

Following the end of the First Civil War, the aims of the Root and Branch Bill were ultimately achieved in October 1646, with the passage of An Ordinance for the abolishing of Archbishops and Bishops in England and Wales and for settling their lands and possessions upon Trustees for the use of the Commonwealth.
