= Clergy Act 1640 =

Act of the Parliament of England

- Act of Parliament
- Parliament of England
- Long title: An Act for disabling all persons in Holy Orders to exercise any temporal jurisdiction or authority.
- Citation: 16 Cha. 1. c. 27
- Territorial extent: England and Wales

Dates
- Royal assent: 14 February 1642
- Commencement: 15 February 1642 (Note: Section 1.)
- Repealed: 8 May 1661
Other legislation
Repealed by	Clergy Act 1661

Status: Repealed

Text of statute as originally enacted

The Clergy Act 1640 (16 Cha. 1. c. 27), also known as the Bishops Exclusion Act, or the Clerical Disabilities Act, was an act of the Parliament of England, effective 13 February 1642 that prevented men in holy orders from exercising any temporal jurisdiction or authority.

Prior to the act, bishops of the Church of England sat in the House of Lords, where they comprised 22 out of a total membership of 60–70 peers. This allowed them to block legislation proposed by the Commons, which was increasingly dominated by Puritans.

"Puritan" was a term for anyone who wanted to reform, or 'purify', the Church of England, and contained many different sects, including Presbyterians, and Congregationalists. Despite differences in doctrine, they opposed bishops, on both religious and political grounds.

Support was limited even among moderates like Viscount Falkland, who wrote; "Those that hated the bishops, hated them more than the Devil; they who loved them, did not love them so well as their dinner."

In 1649, the House of Lords was abolished by the Commonwealth; it was restored in 1660, but bishops were not readmitted until the Clergy Act 1661 (13 Cha. 2 St. 1. c. 2).

== Background ==
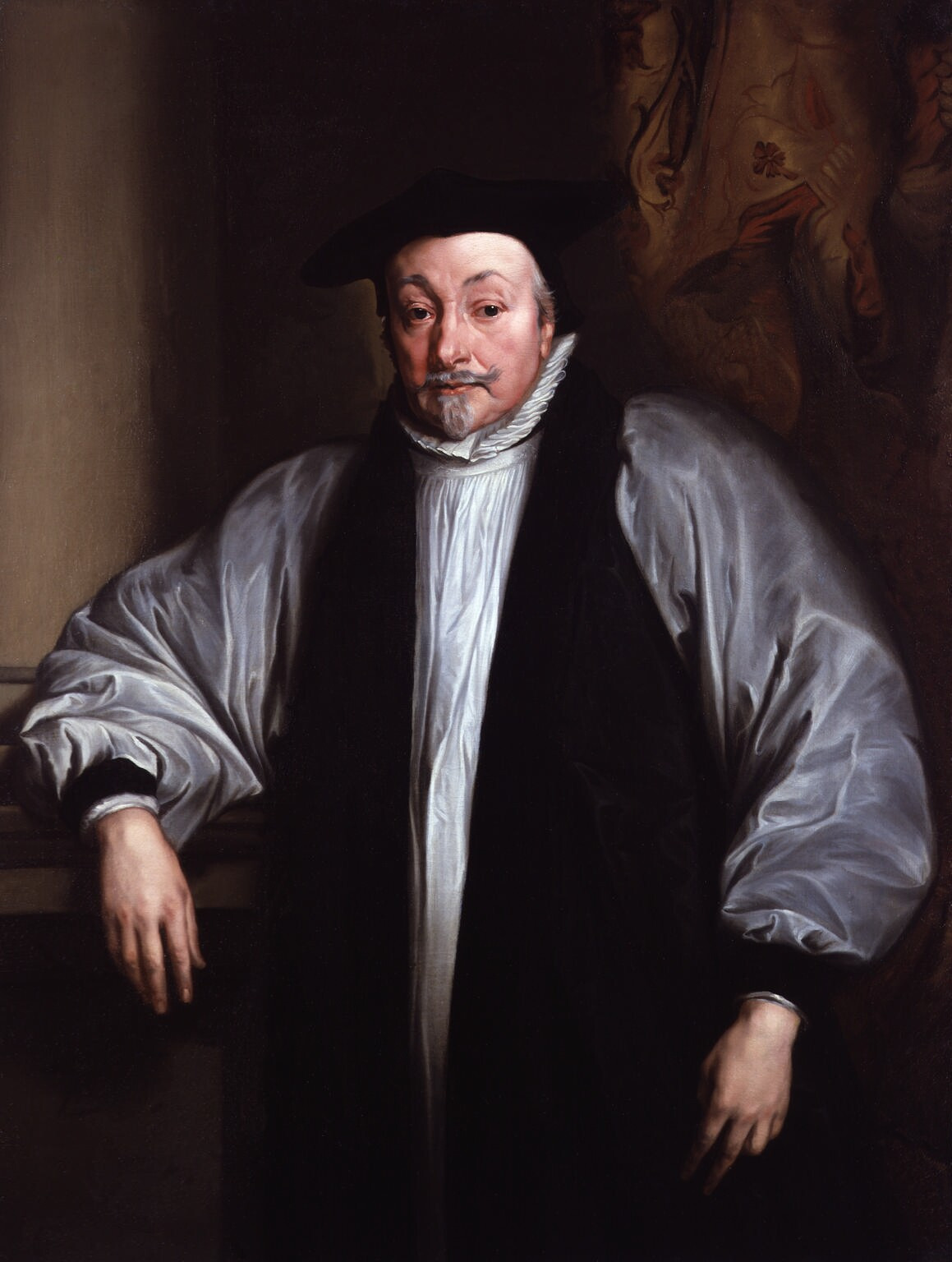
Archbishop Laud, whose reforms led to increasing opposition to the role of bishops

In 1642, the vast majority of Englishmen were 'Royalist', in the sense of a shared belief that a 'well-ordered' monarchy was divinely mandated. They disagreed on what 'well-ordered' meant, and who held ultimate authority in clerical affairs. Royalists generally supported a Church of England governed by bishops, appointed by, and answerable to, the king; Puritans, who formed the core of the Parliamentarian faction, tended to believe that church leaders should be appointed by their congregations.

"Puritan" was a term for anyone who wanted to reform, or 'purify', the Church of England, and contained many different sects. Presbyterians were the most prominent in Parliament, and included leaders like John Pym and John Hampden, but there were many others, such as Congregationalists. Close links between religion and politics added further complexity; one reason for opposition to bishops was their presence in the House of Lords, where they often blocked Parliamentary legislation.

== Passage of the act ==
In 1629, Charles I dissolved Parliament, initiating the period known as Personal Rule. His use of arbitrary taxes, such as Ship money, was resented, not just because of the way they were levied, but how they were spent. Reforms to the Church of England under Archbishop Laud were viewed as covertly favouring Roman Catholic doctrines, and opposed by many of its clergy. In 1984, historian Patrick Collinson, described Laud as "the greatest calamity ever visited upon the English Church".

Attempts to impose similar reforms on the Church of Scotland, or kirk, led to the 1639 and 1640 Bishops' Wars. Charles refused to call Parliament, crippling his army due to lack of funds; defeat resulted in a Covenanter government, which expelled bishops from the kirk. Shortly after the Long Parliament assembled in November 1640, it was presented with the Root and Branch petition; signed by 15,000 Londoners, this demanded the removal of bishops from the Church of England, evidence of popular opposition to Episcopacy.

At this stage, the petition was not adopted by the Commons, although Laud was impeached, and held in the Tower of London. In the first few months of 1641, the Commons passed a series of constitutional measures; the Triennial Act 1640 (16 Cha. 1. c. 1), abolition of the Star Chamber, and an end to levying taxes without Parliament's consent. Once again, the bishops ensured all three were rejected by the Lords.

The Commons responded in June with the Bishops Exclusion Bill, removing them from the Lords, which was rejected once again. The outbreak of the Irish Rebellion in October 1641 raised the political temperature; during December, there were widespread riots in Westminster, led by the London apprentices, which resulted in a number of deaths. Suggestions that Pym and other Parliamentary leaders helped to organise these riots have not been proved, but one result was to prevent bishops attending the Lords.

On 30 December, John Williams, Archbishop of York, signed a complaint along with eleven other bishops, disputing the legality of any laws passed by the Lords during their exclusion. This was viewed by the Commons as inviting Charles to dissolve Parliament, and all twelve were arrested on charges of treason. When Charles left London in January, he was accompanied by many Royalist MPs and members of the Lords. This gave his opponents majorities in both houses, and the bill became law in February 1642.

== Effect of act ==
The Act prevented those in holy orders from exercising any temporal jurisdiction or authority after the 5 February 1641 O.S.; this extended to taking a seat in Parliament or the Privy Council. Any acts carried out with such authority after that date by a member of the clergy were to be considered void.

In 1649, the House of Lords was abolished by the Commonwealth, then restored when Charles II returned in 1660; bishops were not readmitted until the 1661 Clergy Act.

== Bibliography ==
- Ballinger, Chris (2012). The House of Lords 1911–2011: A Century of Non-Reform. Hart Publishing. p. 1890. ISBN 978-1849462891.
- Craig, John (2008), "The Growth of English Puritanism", in Coffey, John; Lim, Paul C. H. (eds.), The Cambridge Companion to Puritanism, Cambridge Companions to Religion, Cambridge University Press, pp. 34–47, ISBN 978-0-521-67800-1
- Collinson, Patrick (1984). The Religion of Protestants: The Church in English Society 1559–1625. Oxford University Press. ISBN 978-0198200536.
- Macleod, Donald (Autumn 2009). "The influence of Calvinism on politics" (PDF). Theology in Scotland. XVI (2): 5–19.
- Manganiello, Stephen (2004). The Concise Encyclopedia of the Revolutions and Wars of England, Scotland, and Ireland, 1639–1660. Scarecrow Press. ISBN 978-0810851009.
- Rees, John (2016). The Leveller Revolution. Verso. ISBN 978-1784783907.
- Smith, Steven (1979). "Almost Revolutionaries: The London Apprentices during the Civil Wars". Huntington Library Quarterly. 42 (4): 313–328. doi:10.2307/3817210. JSTOR 3817210.
- Wedgwood, CV (1958). The King's War, 1641–1647 (2001 ed.). Penguin Classics. ISBN 978-0141390727.
