= Act abolishing the House of Peers =

Act of the Parliament of England

The act abolishing the House of Peers was a 1648 act of the Rump Parliament that abolished the House of Lords in England in the aftermath of the Second English Civil War.

== Provisions ==
The Act dissolved the House of Lords as a legislative chamber, declaring it "useless and dangerous to the people of England". Passed on 19 March 1648, it was part of constitutional change following the English Civil War, being passed two days after the act abolishing the kingship.

== Aftermath and Restoration ==
The abolition of the House of Lords remained in effect throughout the Interregnum (1649–1660). However, the political settlement proved unstable, with power often shifting between Parliament, the New Model Army, and Oliver Cromwell as Lord Protector.

Following the Stuart Restoration in 1660 under Charles II, the House of Lords was reinstated, and the act was declared void because it had not received royal assent. The traditional bicameral structure of Parliament was restored and has continued, with modifications, to the present day.
