= Clergy Act 1661 =

Act of the Parliament of England

- Act of Parliament
- Parliament of England
- Long title: An Act for Repeal of an Act of Parliament Entituled "An Act for disenabling all persons in Holy Orders to exercise any Temporall Jurisdiccion or Authority."
- Citation: 13 Cha. 2 St. 1. c. 2
- Territorial extent: England and Wales

Dates
- Royal assent: 30 July 1661
- Commencement: 8 May 1661 (Note: Start of session.)
- Repealed: 28 July 1863

Other legislation
- Repeals/revokes: Clergy Act 1640
- Repealed by: Statute Law Revision Act 1863

Status: Repealed

Text of statute as originally enacted

The Clergy Act 1661 (13 Cha. 2 St. 1. c. 2) was an act of the Parliament of England passed in 1661. It "repealed, annulled and made void to all intents and purposes" the Clergy Act 1640 (16 Cha. 1. c. 27), which had prevented those in holy orders from exercising any temporal jurisdiction or authority and so, expelled the bishops, as Lords Spiritual, from the House of Lords.

== Subsequent developments ==
The whole act was repealed by section 1 of, and the schedule to, the Statute Law Revision Act 1863 (26 & 27 Vict. c. 125), which came into force on 28 July 1863.
