= Another Time, Another Place =

"Another Time, Another Place" may refer to:

== Music ==
=== Albums ===
- Another Time Another Place, a 1994 album by Matt Bianco
- Another Time, Another Place (Benny Carter and Phil Woods album), 1996
- Another Time, Another Place (Bryan Ferry album), 1974
- Another Time/Another Place, a 1978 album by Barry Altschul
- Another Time, Another Place: Timeless Christian Classics, a 2008 album by Avalon
- Another Time, Another Place EP, a 2007 EP by Avalon

=== Songs ===
- "Another Time, Another Place" (1958 song), by Jay Livingston and Ray Evans from the 1958 film
- "Another Time, Another Place" (Engelbert Humperdinck song), 1971, or the album of the same name
- "Another Time, Another Place", a song by U2 from Boy

== Film ==
- Another Time, Another Place (1958 film), starring Lana Turner and Sean Connery
- Another Time, Another Place (1983 film), starring Phyllis Logan
- "Another Time, Another Place" (Space: 1999), an episode of Space: 1999

== See also ==
- Another Place, Another Time (disambiguation)
