= Another Place, Another Time =

Another Place, Another Time may refer to:

- Another Place, Another Time (album), a 1968 album by Jerry Lee Lewis released
- "Another Place, Another Time" (Don Williams song), 1988
- "Another Place, Another Time" (Del Reeves song), a song originally recorded by Del Reeves and covered by Jerry Lee Lewis

== See also ==
- Another Time, Another Place (disambiguation)
