= Another place =

Euphemism used in parliament and education

"Another place" or "the other place" is a euphemism used in bicameral parliaments using the Westminster system (e.g. United Kingdom) and several rival educational establishments.

== Parliaments ==
The tradition does not extend to business conducted outside the house (such as speeches and interviews), and is generally dropped when a debate is directly addressing the nature of the other house, such as in debates on reform of the House of Lords in the Parliament of the United Kingdom.

== Rivalries between educational establishments ==
The universities of Oxford and Cambridge refer to each other as "the other place", as do the pupils of the British public schools Eton and Harrow.
