= 1984 Birthday Honours =

British government recognitions

Queen's Birthday Honours are announced on or around the date of the Queen's Official Birthday in Australia, Canada, New Zealand and the United Kingdom. The dates vary, both from year to year and from country to country. All are published in supplements to the London Gazette and many are conferred by the monarch (or her representative) some time after the date of the announcement, particularly for those service people on active duty.

The 1984 Queen's Birthday honours lists for New Zealand and the Cook Islands were announced on 16 June 1984.

== United Kingdom ==
=== Privy Counsellor ===
- The Honourable Adam Courtald Butler, MP, Minister of State, Northern Ireland. Member of Parliament for Bosworth.
- John Paul Stanley, MP, Minister of State for the Armed Forces. Member of Parliament for Tonbridge and Malling.

=== Knight Bachelor ===
- Professor Robert James Ball, Principal, London Business School.
- Derek Coates Barber, Chairman, Countryside Commission.
- George Neville Bowman-Shaw, Chairman, Lancer Boss Ltd.
- Nigel Broackes, Chairman, London Docklands Development Corporation.
- George William Langham Christie, DL, Chairman, Glyndebourne Productions.
- Ronald Ernest Dearing, CB, Chairman Post Office.
- John Arnold Farr, MP. For Political Service.
- Owen Whitley Green, Managing Director, BTR plc.
- Professor John Rigby Hale. For services to learning and the arts.
- Professor Richard John Harrison, Chairman, Farm Animal Welfare Council.
- Christopher Raynor Hewetson, TD, President, Law Society.
- David Lean, CBE. For services to the British film industry.
- Robert Lang Lickley, CBE, Director, Fairey Holdings Ltd. For services to aircraft design and engineering.
- Ian George McLeod. For Political and Public Service.
- Frederick William Fitzgerald O'Brien, Sheriff Principal of Lothian and Borders. Sheriff of Chancery in Scotland.
- Arthur John Page, MP. For Political Service.
- Group Captain Gordon Hamish Martin Pirie, CBE. For public services.
- Ralph Riley, Secretary, Agricultural and Food Research Council.
- Thomas Neilson Risk, Governor, Bank of Scotland.
- Gordon James Roberts, CBE, Chairman, Oxford Regional Health Authority.
- Jack Seddon Rumbold, President, Industrial Tribunals, England and Wales.
- Patrick John Rushton Sergeant, City Editor, Daily Mail.
- Eric Sharp, CBE, Chairman and Chief Executive, Cable & Wireless plc
- John Maldwyn Thomas. For Political Service in Wales.
- John Julius Wells, CBE. For Political Service.
- David Wolfson. For Political Service.
- Leslie Clarence Young, Chairman, Merseyside Development Corporation.

=== Order of the Bath ===
==== Knight Grand Cross ====
Military Division
Navy

- Admiral Sir William Staveley KCB

Air Force

- Air Chief Marshal Sir David Craig, KCB OBE

Civil Division

- Sir William Kerr Fraser KCB, Permanent Under-Secretary of State, Scottish Office.

==== Knight Commander ====
Military Division
Navy

- Vice Admiral Derek Roy Reffell
- Vice Admiral Anthony Sanders Tippet, CB

Army

- Lieutenant General John Bryan Akehurst, CBE (407732), Deputy Colonel The Royal Anglian Regiment.

Air Force

- Acting Air Marshal David Harcourt-Smith, DFC

Civil Division

- Ewen Broadbent, CB CMG, Second Permanent Under-Secretary of State, Ministry of Defence.
- Peter John Harrop, CB, Second Permanent Secretary, Department of the Environment.
- (Anthony) Derek Maxwell Oulton CB, Permanent Secretary, Lord Chancellor's Department, and Clerk of the Crown in Chancery.

==== Companion ====
Military Division
Navy

- Rear Admiral Robert Goodwin Baylis, OBE
- Rear Admiral David Michael Eckersley-Maslin
- Rear Admiral John William Townshend Walters
- Rear Admiral John Charles Warsop.

Army

- Major General Simon John Beardsworth (407753), late Royal Tank Regiment.
- Major General John Charles Oswald Rooke Hopkinson (418296), Colonel Queen's Own Highlanders (Seaforth and Camerons)
- Major General Michael Matthews (414922), late Corps of Royal Engineers.
- Major General Tony Brian Palmer (438472), late Corps of Royal Electrical and Mechanical Engineers.
- Brigadier Vera Margaret Rooke, CBE, RRC, QHNS (417111), Queen Alexandra's Royal Army Nursing Corps.

Air Force

- Air Vice-Marshal Erik Peter Bennett
- Air Vice-Marshal John Nigel Carlyle Cooke, OBE, QHP
- Air Vice-Marshal Alan Rawes Martindale
- Air Vice-Marshal George Alan White, AFC

Civil Division

- Hamish McEwan Allen - Head of Administration Department, House of Commons.
- Derek Henry Andrews CBE - Deputy Secretary, Ministry of Agriculture, Fisheries and Food.
- William Arthur Francis Brister - Deputy Director General, Prison Service.
- Graham Gordon Campbell - Under-Secretary, Department of Energy.
- Christopher Walter France - Deputy Under-Secretary of State, Ministry of Defence.
- Alexander Douglas Gordon-Brown - Receiver for the Metropolitan Police District.
- John Halliday Gracey - Director General (Management), Board of Inland Revenue.
- Norman Trenchard Hardyman - Secretary, University Grants Committee.
- John Philip Hayes - lately Chief Economic Adviser, Foreign and Commonwealth Office.
- Geoffrey Holland - Deputy Secretary, Department of Employment.
- Alan Stafford Howard Kettle - lately Assistant Under Secretary, Ministry of Defence.
- Alexander William Loten - Under-Secretary, Department of the Environment.
- John Gethin Morgan-Owen MBE QC, Judge Advocate General.
- John Hubert Parkes - Permanent Secretary, Department of Education for Northern Ireland.
- Thomas Alan Parson - Chief Adjudication Officer, Department of Health and Social Security.
- David Francis Williamson - Deputy Secretary, Cabinet Office.

=== Order of St Michael and St George ===
==== Companion ====
- Professor Denis Anthony Mitchison, Professor of Bacteriology, Royal Postgraduate Medical School.

=== Royal Victorian Order ===
==== Dame Commander ====
- Kathryn Edith Helen, Mrs. Dugdale CVO
- Miss Jean Mary Monica Maxwell-Scott CVO

==== Knight Commander ====
- Captain Alastair Sturgis Aird, CVO

==== Commander ====
- Captain Edgar George Brown CBE, Royal Navy.
- Cyril Edward Sheehan Horsford
- Major General Giles Hallam Mills CB OBE
- Lieutenant Colonel Sir Julian Tolver Paget Bt
- Michael David Tims MVO

==== Members ====
Fourth Class

- Commander Francis John Cadman Bradshaw, Royal Navy.
- Robert Cecil Crowhurst OBE
- Borge Lund Hansen
- Douglas Savery Eyre Hayward
- Lieutenant Colonel Alec Jackson MBE, The Life Guards
- James Arthur Linfield
- Captain The Honourable Jeremy Neville Stopford, Irish Guards
- Alfred Roland Wiseman

Fifth Class

- Squadron Leader Martin Ian Snowden Anderson, Royal Air Force.
- Miss Sarah Patricia Brennan.
- Audrey, Mrs. Crooks
- Miss Jean Fisher MBE
- Superintendent Anthony Earle Hawkins, Metropolitan Police.
- Squadron Leader Derek John James, Royal Air Force
- Chief Inspector George John Kirchin, Metropolitan Police.
- Evelyn Mary, Mrs. Lemaire
- Alan Norman Maxwell
- James McGurk
- Miss Christine Seaman

=== Royal Victorian Medal ===
Silver

- Ronald Edward Andrews
- Miss Catherine Clarke
- Edward Andrew Dodd
- Divisional Sergeant Major Kenneth Edgington - The Queen's Bodyguard of the Yeomen of the Guard
- E8075935 Sergeant Ronald Anthony Ellse - Royal Air Force
- Victor Gediking
- George Samuel Hodgon
- James Leonard Jackson
- Leonard Jakeman
- Petty Officer (Seaman) Brian Jane, J958853R
- Chief Marine Engineering Mechanic (Mechanical) David Frank Kingswood, D101088B
- Divisional Sergeant Major Frederick Laing - The Queen's Bodyguard of the Yeomen of the Guard
- Miss Sheila Mackinnon
- George Marsland
- Bridget Veronica, Mrs. Millard
- John Ross

=== Order of the Companions of Honour ===
- The Right Honourable David McAdam, Viscount Eccles KCVO - For political and public services, especially to the Arts.
- Sir Arnold Joseph Philip Powell OBE - For services to Architecture.
- Professor Friedrich August von Hayek - For services to the study of Economics.

=== Order of the British Empire ===
==== Dame Commander of the Order of the British Empire (DBE) ====
Civil

- Joan Anna Dalziel, Mrs. Seccombe - For political and public services.

==== Knight Commander of the Order of the British Empire (KBE) ====
Military
Navy

- Rear Admiral David William Haslam CB OBE

Civil

- The Right Honourable Morys George Lyndhurst, Baron Aberdare. For Political Service.
- Professor Raymond Hoffenberg, President, Royal College of Physicians.
- Professor Geoffrey Slaney, President, Royal College of Surgeons of England.

==== Commander of the Order of the British Empire (CBE) ====
Military
Navy

- Captain Charles Edward Thurlow Baker MBE, Royal Navy
- Captain Geoffrey George William Hayhoe, Royal Navy
- Captain Patrick Timothy SHEEHAN, Royal Navy

Army

- Colonel Francis Allan Littlejohns Alstead (445777), late The King's Own Scottish Borderers.
- Colonel William Arthur Eakins TD QHP (464520), late Royal Army Medical Corps, Territorial Army.
- Colonel Peter Forshaw OBE (444529), late Royal Army Ordnance Corps.
- Brigadier James Bernard Howard (443095), late The King's Own Royal Border Regiment.
- Brigadier Reginald Keith Hudson (397160), Army Catering Corps.
- Brigadier Gregory Read (440142), late Royal Tank Regiment (now RARO).
- The Reverend Peter Graham Whiting QHC (471405), Deputy Chaplain General, Royal Army Chaplains' Department.

Air Force

- Air Commodore Ronald Ernest Gladding, Royal Air Force.
- Air Commodore William John James Northmore, Royal Air Force.
- Group Captain James Morris OBE, Royal Air Force
- Group Captain Charles John Thomson AFC, Royal Air Force.

Civil

- Walter Ronald Alexander, Chairman, Walter Alexander plc. For services to export.
- Peter Henry Bruce Allsop, Chairman, Associated Book Publishers plc.
- Peter Armitage, Professor of Biomathematics, University of Oxford.
- Cedric Ashley, Director, Motor Industry Research Association.
- John Ashton, Professor of Agricultural Economics, University of Newcastle
- Michael Barker, Senior Agricultural Officer (Grade 4), Ministry of Agriculture, Fisheries and Food.
- The Right Honourable David Bleakley, Chairman, Northern Ireland Standing Advisory Commission on Human Rights.
- Harry Blech OBE, Musical Director, Haydn-Mozart Society.
- Miss Helen Jane Brotherton OBE BEM, lately, Chairman, Wessex Regional Committee, National Trust.
- Arabella Selina, Mrs. Brown. For Political and Public Service.
- David Peter James Browning, Chief Education Officer, Buckinghamshire.
- James Hilton Brownlow QPM, H.M. Inspector of Constabulary.
- Ronald William Buckingham OBE, National Chairman, Royal British Legion.
- Ivor Bulmer-Thomas. For services to the preservation of historic buildings.
- Joseph Stuart Burgess, Chief Executive, Amersham International. For services to export.
- Godfrey James Carter. For services to the Law Commission.
- Richard Byron Caws, Crown Estate Commissioner.
- Frederick John Michael Chaplin. For Political and Public Service.
- Malcolm Hilbery Chaplin. For Political and Public Service.
- Christopher Robert Cheney. For services to English mediaeval history.
- Hilton Swift Clarke, Chairman, Exco International plc.
- John Byerley Clemetson, Senior Official Receiver, Insolvency Service, Department of Trade and Industry.
- Adrian Fraser Canning Clissitt QPM, Chief Constable, Hertfordshire Constabulary.
- David Jervis Coats, Senior Partner, Babtie, Shaw and Morton, Consulting Engineers.
- Brigadier Colin Hunter Cowan DL, Chief Executive, Cumbernauld New Town Development Corporation.
- James Cowley, Grade 4 Surveyor, Department of Transport.
- Robert George Reginald Daniels DL, lately Chairman, Essex County Council.
- Ivor Roland Morgan Davies. For Political Service.
- John Howard Davies, Director of Education, Clwyd.
- Bramwell John Deacon. For Political and Public Service.
- William Eric Denny, Chairman, Home Secretary's Advisory Board on Restricted Patients.
- Professor Robert Buchan Duthie, Nuffield Professor of Orthopaedic Surgery, University of Oxford.
- Barry Warwick East, Regional Works Officer, North East Thames Regional Health Authority.
- Frank Wallis Edwards, lately Chairman, Latin American Trade Advisory Group. For services to Export.
- Vivian John Herman Ellis, Composer and Author.
- Thomas Myrddin Evans OBE, President, Farmers' Union of Wales.
- Joseph Sidney Fawcett, Farmer; Vice-President National Farmers' Union, North Yorkshire.
- Ian Stark Flett, Director of Education, Fife Region.
- James Anthony Gaffney, Director of Engineering Services, West Yorkshire Metropolitan County Council.
- Robert Thomas Gardner, Vice-President and Chief General Manager, Bradford and Bingley Building Society.
- Roy Harry George MBE, Chairman and Managing Director, Celluware Ltd. For services to Export.
- Nicholas Georgiadis, Artist and Stage Designer.
- Alan Breck Gilmour, Director, National Society for the Prevention of Cruelty to Children.
- Professor Ronald Haxton Girdwood, President, Royal College of Physicians of Edinburgh.
- Norman MacLeod Glen TD. For Political Service.
- Jayvantsinh Kayaji Gohel. For Political and Public Service.
- James Stuart Gordon, Managing Director, Radio Clyde.
- Alan Thomas Gregory, Director, UK and External Affairs, BP International Ltd.
- Professor Ronald Gulliford, Professor and Head, Department of Special Education, University of Birmingham.
- John Brown Hardy, lately President, Cocoa, Chocolate and Confectionery Alliance.
- Leonard Harton DL, Managing Director, Newcastle Chronicle and Journal Ltd.
- Raymond Heron, lately Chief Scientific Officer ' B ', Ministry of Defence.
- John Hosier, Principal, Guildhall School of Music and Drama.
- Arthur Henry James Hoskins, Deputy Chairman and Group Chief Executive, Matthew Hall plc.
- John Imrie, Keeper of the Records of Scotland (Grade 5), Scottish Record Office.
- Professor James Alistair MacFarlane Inglis. For services to the Scottish legal profession.
- Thomas Garnet Henry James, Keeper, British Museum.
- Jack William Jessop, Board Member (Director of Safety Services), British Airways.
- Kenneth Edward Kemp-Turner DL, lately Chairman, Suffolk County Council.
- Harry Kleeman, Chairman, Plastics Processing Economic Development Committee.
- Paul George Koralek, Architect, Ahrends, Burton and Koralek.
- Olaf Francis Lambert, Director General, Automobile Association.
- Professor Leslie Philip Le Quesne, Deputy Vice-Chancellor and Dean of the Faculty of Medicine, University of London.
- John Edward Leck, Assistant, Director of Public Prosecutions.
- John Thirlestane Leonard, Chairman and Chief Executive, Carless Capel and Leonard plc.
- Joseph Levy MBE BEM. For charitable services.
- James Richard Lloyd, lately Non-Executive Director, Bass plc.
- Albert John Long, Chairman, Social Work Committee, Strathclyde Regional Council.
- William Low, Chairman and Managing Director, Don Bros, Buist plc.
- Martin Osbert Maconachie, Senior Technical Adviser, Ministry of Defence.
- Francis Anthony Mallett, lately Chief Executive, South Yorkshire County Council.
- Victor Robert Margrie, Director, Crafts Centre.
- Peter Mathias, Chichele Professor of Economic History, University of Oxford.
- Stuart McDowall, Senior Lecturer in Economics, University of St. Andrews.
- Ronald William Mellor, Director, Ford Motor Company Ltd.
- Arnold Robert Mountford, Director, Stoke-on-Trent City Museum.
- Geoffrey Myers, Board Member and Joint Managing Director (Railways), British Railways Board.
- Jan Neumann, Managing Director, YARD Ltd. For services to Export.
- Professor Thomas Ernest Oppé, Director of Paediatric Unit, St Mary's Hospital, London.
- Alan Christopher Palmer, Chief Supplementary Benefits Officer, Department of Health and Social Security.
- Charles Henry Palmer. For services to Cricket.
- The Right Honourable Victoria Ellen, Lady Palmer, Vice-Chairman of the Council, British Red Cross Society.
- Professor Kenneth Alwyne Pounds, Professor of Space Physics and Director, X-ray Astronomy Group, University of Leicester.
- David Lynn Pratt, Controller of Engineering, Commonwealth Development Corporation.
- Norman Quick. For Political and Public Service.
- Charles John Risk, lately Chairman, National Council, Association of British Chambers of Commerce.
- Waheeb Rizk OBE, Chairman, British Standards Institution.
- Robert Roberts, Deputy Chief Scientific Officer, Department of Trade and Industry.
- Eric Brian Roycroft, Director of Social Services, Newcastle upon Tyne Metropolitan Borough Council.
- Peter William Sharman, lately Chief General Manager, Norwich Union Insurance Group.
- Miss Theodora Martha Simmons, Assistant Secretary, Northern Ireland Office.
- Robert Anthony Sly, Managing Director, Telephone Rentals plc.
- Leslie Stevens, Chairman, Fothergill and Harvey plc.
- Charles Edwin Taylor, Director, Scottish Crop Research Institute.
- Peter Tyrer, Senior Principal Inspector of Taxes, Board of Inland Revenue.
- Kenneth Murray Walton, Managing Director, STC Components Ltd.
- John Alleyne Wedgewood, lately Chairman, Southern Electricity Board.
- Timothy Lancaster West, Actor and Director.
- Brian Ernest Whitaker, Managing Director. Navy, Army and Air Force Institutes.
- Iorwerth Williams, Principal, Braintree College of Further Education.
- George Wilson, Director, Royal Association for Disability and Rehabilitation.

==== Officer of the Order of the British Empire (OBE) ====
Military
Navy

- Commander David William Ashby, Royal Navy
- Commander Kenneth Roger Brooke Cadogan-Rawlinson, Royal Navy
- Commander Michael Bernard Casement, Royal Navy
- Commander Michael Graham Chattock, Royal Navy
- Commander Russell Pepin Hemming Johnson, Royal Navy
- Commander Douglas George Littlejohns, Royal Navy
- Commander William Norman, Royal Navy
- Commander Francis Noel Ponsonby MVO, Royal Navy
- Commander Colin Thomas Stoner, Royal Navy
- Lieutenant Colonel David Robert Bruce Storrie, Royal Marines
- Commander Edward White, Royal Navy

Army

- Lieutenant Colonel Jean Christine Blackwood TD (477238), Women's Royal Army Corps, Territorial Army.
- Lieutenant Colonel Michael William Hewlett Branch MBE (466588), Royal Corps of Transport
- Lieutenant Colonel Graham Frederick Victor Cowell (465743), Royal Army Ordnance Corps.
- Lieutenant Colonel Thomas David Dean (420820), The Royal Anglian Regiment.
- Lieutenant Colonel Bryan Hawkins Dutton MBE (473935), The Devonshire and Dorset Regiment.
- Lieutenant Colonel Michael Crayden Edmunds (467552), Royal Regiment of Artillery.
- Acting Colonel Maxwell Dennis Embury MBE (381861), Army Cadet Force, Territorial Army.
- Lieutenant Colonel John Gordon Goddard de Poulton Ferguson (472537), 1st The Queen's Dragoon Guards.
- Lieutenant Colonel Julian John Finch Field MC (473943), The Devonshire and Dorset Regiment.
- Acting Lieutenant Colonel Denis Edward Grant (468571), Combined Cadet Force, Territorial Army.
- Lieutenant Colonel (Assistant Paymaster) Gerald Charles Grint (474632), Royal Army Pay Corps.
- Lieutenant Colonel Rupert David Nicholas (461479), The Light Infantry.
- Acting Colonel Frank Kenneth Pike (381188), Army Cadet Force, Territorial Army.
- Lieutenant Colonel Patrick Andrew Redmond Prior (467617), Royal Regiment of Artillery.
- Lieutenant Colonel William John Pherrick Robins MBE (469087), Royal Corps of Signals.
- Lieutenant Colonel Reginald Keith Sampson MBE (445962), Royal Regiment of Artillery.
- Lieutenant Colonel Barry Joseph Sanderson (454069), Corps of Royal Engineers.
- Lieutenant Colonel David Edmund Stevens TD (476752), Royal Regiment of Artillery, Territorial Army.

Air Force

- Wing Commander George Michael Boddy (4169557), Royal Air Force.
- Wing Commander John Malcolm Clemitson (3519463), Royal Air Force.
- Wing Commander John Gray Fielding (2418387), Royal Air Force.
- Wing Commander Duncan Arthur Griffiths AFC (608253), Royal Air Force.
- Wing Commander Stephen Russell Hill (508322), Royal Air Force.
- Wing Commander Alan Finlay Jackson (506486), Royal Air Force.
- Wing Commander Peter George Johnson (4231861), Royal Air Force.
- Wing Commander Christopher Peter Lumb (4231950), Royal Air Force.
- Wing Commander William James McBurney (158763), Royal Air Force.
- Wing Commander Malcolm Anthony Pardoe Pugh (3134517), Royal Air Force.
- Wing Commander (now Group Captain) Terence Brian Sherrington (4335254), Royal Air Force.
- Wing Commander Reginald Wright (3110208), Royal Air Force.

Civil

- Joseph Adams, Leader, Sandwell Metropolitan Borough Council.
- Barbara, Mrs. Adams, Grade 6, Department of the Environment.
- William George Greenlees Alexander, Partner, William Alexander (Eynsford) Ltd.
- Yaqub Ali, Chairman and Managing Director, A A Brothers Ltd.
- James Frank Allcocl, Director of Petroleum Purchasing, British Gas Corporation.
- Kenneth William Allday, T.D. For services to the Jockey Club.
- James Masson Anderson, D.L., lately Chairman, Moray District Council.
- Robert Cameron Ashworth, Sales Director, The Marconi Company Ltd. For services to Export.
- Geoffrey Lavie Auret, M.B.E., lately Secretary, Northern Ireland Chamber of Commerce and Industry.
- Evelyn, Lady Barbarolli. For services to music.
- Susan Mary, The Honourable Mrs. Baring, Member, Inner London Probation Committee.
- Albert Battersby, Managing Director, VDU Installations Ltd.
- Jeremy Henry Benson, Chairman, Georgian Group.
- Thomas William Bewsey, Director, British Marine Equipment Council.
- Stanley Blow. For Political and Public Service.
- Patricia Anne, Mrs. Bowen-West, Deputy Director, Bedford College of Higher Education.
- Dorothea Ethel, Mrs. Brett. For Political and Public Service.
- Richard Lindsay Bristow. For Political and Public Service.
- George Robert Bruce. For services to poetry and the arts in Scotland.
- Eileen Margaret, Mrs. Burberge. For services to the Girl Guides Association.
- Thomas Burke, Chief Probation Officer, Middlesex Area Probation Services.
- Clifford Luther Burman, M.B.E. For services to the Royal British Legion in Norfolk.
- Gerald Raymond Burt, B.E.M., lately Chief Secretary, British Railways Board.
- James Burton, Medical Director, ECHO (Equipment for Charity Hospitals Overseas).
- Richard Anson Burton, Chairman, British Growers' Look Ahead National Conference and Exhibition.
- Charles Frederick Bushell, Principal, Ministry of Defence.
- Philip Rawlins Butcher, Assistant Director-General, National Farmers' Union.
- Alasdair Blair Cameron, Director of Research and Development, J. H. Fenner and Company Ltd.
- Archibald Doon Campbell. For services to journalism.
- John Thomas Carter, Editor, Western Morning News.
- William Nicholas Carter, Typographer and Calligrapher, Rampant Lions Press.
- Miss Elizabeth Kate Chapman, Lecturer, Department of Special Education, University of Birmingham.
- George Chisholm, Jazz Trombonist.
- Hubert Neville Chittick. For services to the archaeology and ethnohistory of East Africa.
- George William Clark. For services to political journalism.
- Frances Pickett, Lady Clarke, Vice Chairman, Venice in Peril.
- Eric George Clifton, lately Livestock Husbandry Advisory Officer Grade I, Ministry of Agriculture, Fisheries and Food.
- John Farrington Cooke, lately Joint Managing Director, Castings pic.
- John Michael Cooling, Chairman, J. M. Cooling Group of Companies.
- Charles Henry John Cope, Operations Director (Railways), London Transport Executive.
- Murray Gibson Cowie, Principal Professional and Technology Officer, Ministry of Defence.
- Sidney Walter Reginald Cox, Acting Director, National Institute of Agricultural Engineering.
- Ethel Eva, Mrs. Crane, lately Director, International Bee Research Association.
- Dennis Bryon Crawford. For services to Forestry particularly in Scotland.
- Lieutenant Colonel Graeme Campbell Eley Crew, (Retd.), Secretary, Winchester Division, Soldiers', Sailors' and Airmen's Families Association.
- Thomas James Crispin, National Secretary (Power and Engineering Group), Transport & General Workers' Union.
- Michael John Cufflin, For Political and Public Service.
- Tudor David, Editor, Education.
- James Duncan Gordon Davidson, M.V.O., Chief Executive, Royal Highland and Agricultural Society of Scotland.
- John Duncan Davies, Director, Polytechnic of Wales.
- Brian Kay Davison, Director, Inco Europe Ltd.
- Douglas William Day, Chairman, British institute of Industrial Therapy.
- Kenneth John Dean, Principal, South East London College
- John David Dibley, Assistant Chief Constable, Sussex Police
- William Leslie Dick-Smith, Chief Executive, Stewartry District Council.
- Geoffrey Malcolm Dinsley, Chairman, Prescription Pricing Authority.
- Patrick Ray Dodds, Director and Secretary of Co-ordination, Food from Britain.
- Michael Hutchinson Dorey, lately Inspector, Board of Inland Revenue.
- David Keith Duckworth, Chairman and Chief Engineer, Cosworth Engineering Ltd. For services to Export.
- Patrick Dyas. For services to Yachting.
- Miss Lois Edith Dyer, Physiotherapy Officer, Department of Health and Social Security.
- Irene Florence, Mrs. Dyson. For Political and Public Service.
- Richard Westcombe Elliott, Chairman, F W Elliott Ltd. For services to Export.
- Kenneth Forbes. For Political and Public Service.
- Anthony French, Principal, Board of Customs and Excise.
- Tom French, lately Manager, Product Consultancy Service, Technology Division, Dunlop Ltd.
- Sydney Robert Fudge, Chief Executive and Managing Director, RGC Offshore Ltd.
- Maurice Gaffney, Counselling Adviser, Small Firms Service.
- Miss Kathleen Wallace Galbraith, Chief Administrative Nursing Officer, Southern Health and Social Services Board.
- Gordon Barry Gasson, Architect, Barry Gasson Associates.
- Neville Heathcoat Gimson, Divisional General Manager, North West Water Authority.
- Laszlo Daniel Gombos, Senior Trustee, Petroleum Law Education Trust.
- Donald Cameron Easterbrook Gorrie. For Political and Public Service in Scotland.
- Miss Margaret Graham, Head of Cataloguing, Science Reference Library, British Library.
- Ian Alistair Donald Grant, lately Conservator of Forests for East Scotland, Forestry Commission.
- Betty, Lady Gunn, Member, Greater Glasgow Health Board.
- Thomas Burns Haig, Principal, Scottish Education Department.
- David William Halsey, Q.P.M., Deputy Assistant Commissioner, Metropolitan Police.
- James Millar Hamilton, Headteacher, Harris Academy, Dundee.
- George Owen Hardy, Deputy Headmaster, Royal Hospital School, Ipswich.
- Douglas Robert Harvey, lately Director General, United Kingdom Petroleum Industry Association.
- John Glendinnen Hasler, Regional Adviser in General Practice, Oxford Medical School.
- Norman Higham, Librarian, University of Bristol.
- Derek Alexander Holloway, Principal, Ministry of Defence.
- Edward William George Charles Howell, Chief Executive, Land Authority for Wales.
- Frederick John Janes, lately Principal, Yeovil, College, Somerset.
- Miss Claris Freeman Jayne, Principal Social Worker Service Officer, Department of Health and Social Security. '
- George, Johnson, District Officer, Omash ATGWU; for public services in Northern Ireland
- Allan Neill Johnston, Chairman, North-Eastern Education and Library Board.
- Raymond Evan Jones, Director, Keep Wales Tidy Campaign.
- Wilfred Henry Jones, Chairman, Wigan New Enterprise Ltd.
- William, Jones, Administrator, Manchester Family Practitioner Committee.
- Doris, Mrs. Keningham, Vice-Chairman, Pontefract Health Authority.
- William Kerns, Senior Regional Medical Officer, North Western Postal Board, Post Office.
- Ronald Edward King, For Political and Public Service.
- Miss Joan Mary Knight, Artistic Director, Perth Theatre.
- John James Knight, Consulting Physicist, Royal National Ear, Nose and Throat Hospital, London.
- Robert Malcolm Knox, Member, Lothian Regional Council.
- Mervyn Russell Kohler. For Political Service.
- Professor Ivor Robert Kramer, Emeritus Professor of Oral Pathology, University of London.
- John Frederick Langley M.B.E., Principal, Department of Transport.
- Blair Kenneth Larkey, Company Secretary, Birds Eye Walls Ltd.
- Reginald Isaac Latham. For services to local government in Manchester.
- Kenneth Alexander Lee, Vice-Chairman, British Refugee Council.
- Howard Noel Leese, Principal Professional Technology Officer, Ministry of Defence.
- Jean, Mrs. Lever, Headteacher, Clarendon County Primary School.
- Harold Lewis, Managing Director, Television Installation Services Ltd., Mansfield.
- Richard John Lillicrap, Director of Water Service Management, Welsh Water Authority.
- George Frank Lindley, Managing Director, Opencast Executive, National Coal Board.
- John Lloyd, Leader, Stockport Metropolitan Borough Council.
- William Anthony Lloyd, Nursing Adviser, Health Advisory Service.
- Harry Frederick Lowe, Managing Director, Brintons Ltd.
- James Clarke Macfarlane, Chairman, Grampian and Tayside Area Manpower Board.
- Wing Commander Angus George Campbell Maclean, (Retd.) Deputy Regional Chairman, Wales Region, Air Training Corps.
- Elspeth Guthrie, Mrs. Maclean, Home and Leisure Safety, Royal Society for the prevention of Accidents.
- Captain Arthur Robert Manvell, R.N. Director, Short Brothers, Limited.
- The Right Honourable Pansy Constance, Countess of Mar and Kellie. For Services to Youth and the community.
- Miss Lucy Mardon. For Political and Public Service.
- Bernard Montague Marks, lately Chairman and Vice-Chairman, Federation of Personnel Services of Great Britain.
- Arthur Ivor Marsh, Senior Research Fellow in Industrial Relations, University of Oxford.
- George Barrie Marson, Chairman and Managing Director, Oxford Instruments Group pic. For services to Export.
- Herbert William Massie, Executive Assistant to Director, Royal Association for Disability and Rehabilitation.
- Miss Betty Rowena Masters, Deputy Keeper of Records, City of London.
- Duncan Nicol McCallum, Chief Officer, Cambridgeshire Fire and Rescue Service.
- Wynford McCarthy, lately Deputy Superintending Inspector, Department of Employment.
- Dennis William McKenzie, Principal, Department of Trade and Industry.
- Wilfred McMann, Inspector (SP), Board of Inland Revenue.
- George McMaster, Director, Northern Ireland Training Executive.
- Stanhope Lindsay Charles Medrington, lately Managing Director, Thomas Baty & Son Ltd.
- Alastair David Milne, Director, Wolfson Micro electronics Institute, University of Edinburgh.
- Professor Geoffrey Duncan Mitchell, M.B.E., lately Chairman Board of Visitors, HM Prison Dartmoor.
- Arthur Cyril Moore, Senior Principal Scientific Officer, Ministry of Defence.
- Gwynfryn Richard Morgan, Headmaster, St. George School, Bristol.
- Professor John Edgar Morison, lately Consultant Histopathologist, Belfast City Hospital.
- Ernest John Morris, Radio and Television Broadcaster
- Maude Catherine, Mrs. Murchison, Chairman, Highland Region Children's Panel Advisory Committee.
- Professor John Campbell Murdoch, Senior Principal Scientific Officer, Department of Agriculture for Northern Ireland.
- Ewan Skinner Murray, lately General Secretary, Scottish Amateur Athletic Association.
- David George Hargraves Nelson. For Political Service.
- James Edward Nelson. For services to Rugby Football.
- Joseph Edward Nesbitt, Professor of Education and Head of the Education Centre, New University of Ulster.
- Miss Mary Alicia Neville-Kaye, Chief Welfare Officer, St. John Ambulance Brigade.
- Deryck Hamilton Kenneth Nicholls, Assistant Chief Financial Officer, British Airways.
- Richard James Anthony Noble. For services to Motor Racing.
- Patrick Joseph O'Neill, Assistant Director Housing (Administration), Northern Ireland Housing Executive.
- Roy Edward Olding, Headmaster, Royal West of England Residential School for the Deaf, Exeter.
- John Bryan Ord, Deputy Chief Constable, Cleveland Constabulary.
- Richard John Pethbridge, lately Senior Managing Director, Union Discount Company of London.
- John Aston Pickford. For services to water and waste engineering in the developing world.
- Miss Jean Muriel Plaister, Director, London and South Eastern Library Region.
- William Podmore. For Political and Public Service.
- Miss Joan Mary Porter, M.B.E., lately Assistant Private Secretary, Prime Minister's Office.
- George Edward Povey. For Political and Public Service.
- Brian Powell, Director of Station Design and Project Director, Central Electricity Generating Board.
- Gordon Race, Executive Partner, Pell Frischmann & Partners, Consulting Engineers.
- William Edgar Rees. For Political and Public Service.
- James Stewart Robertson, District Medical Officer, Scunthorpe Health Authority.
- Michael Perkin Robinson, T.D., D.L., lately Vice Chairman, Yorkshire and Humberside Territorial Auxiliary Volunteer Reserve Association.
- Harold Albert Russett, National Chairman. Road Haulage Association.
- Basil Ernest Vyvyan Sabine, Chairman, Tameside and Glossop Family Practitioner Committee.
- Morley William Sage, Director of Computing Services, University of Southampton.
- Donald Lorimer Schultz, Donald Pollock Reader in Engineering Science, University of Oxford.
- Colin Stuart Shepherd, Chairman and Managing Director, Shepherd Homes Ltd.
- Elspeth, Mrs. Sitters, Chairman, Plymouth Age Concern.
- John Alan Smith, For Political Service.
- Captain Peter Watkin Roberts Smith, Chairman, P A L Shipping Service Ltd.
- Ronald James Smith, Vice-Chairman, North of Scotland College of Agriculture.
- Cecil George Taylor, Manager, Outside Interests and Unitization, Amoco (UK) Exploration Company.
- Margaret Edith, Mrs. Thorne, Director, West Glamorgan Branch, British Red Cross Society.
- Professor Gerald Charles Timbury, lately Dean of Postgraduate Medicine, University of Glasgow.
- John Charlie Tiplady. For Political and Public Service.
- Ronald Albert Tucker, lately Executive Director. Cystic Fibrosis Research Trust.
- Tom Edward Turvey, D.L. For services to the magistracy in Bristol.
- George Waldron, Senior Principal, Department of Trade and Industry.
- Miss Monica Walton, Chairman, Health Visitors' Association.
- Horace Waterton Lee, D.L. For services to local government in Kent.
- John Philip Wells, Executive Director/Chairman of the executive committee, Proprietary Association of Great Britain.
- Walter Weston, Senior Partner, Phillips and Leigh.
- Richard Timothy Whiteley, D.L., Chairman, Water Research Centre.
- Miss Irene Whittaker, Co-Chairman, GCE and CSE Boards' Joint Council for National Criteria for 16+ examination.
- James Wiseman Wilson. For charitable services in Scotland.
- Kathleen Agnes, Mrs. Young. Chairman, Rural Voice.

Diplomatic Service and Overseas List

- Aubrey Norman Beaumont. For services to agricultural development in Zambia.
- Anthony James Bird. For services to the British community in Portugal.
- Dr. Roger George Bowers. For services to education in Egypt.
- Charles Christopher Higgins Burne. For services to British commercial interests in Australia.
- Dr. James Michael Cairns. For services to medicine and the community in Zambia.
- Charles McKenzie Chadwick, British Council Representative, Canada.
- Chan Kam-chuen. For public services in Hong Kong.
- Richard Billing Dearlove. First Secretary, H.M. Embassy, Paris.
- Colonel Bernard Alfred Edridge, M.B.E. (Retd.). For services to British commercial and community interests in Greece.
- Colin William Gresham Endacott. For services to British commercial interests in Singapore.
- Victor Ghio. For public services in Gibraltar.
- John Havelock Girling. For services to commerce and the community in Papua New Guinea.
- Anthony Hugh Grainger. For services to British commercial interests in Belgium.
- Neville Harrison Green. For services to British commercial interests in Malaysia.
- David Peter Love Harper. For services to education in Saudi Arabia.
- Henry Mollison Hogg. For services to civil engineering in Sri Lanka.
- Graham Lankford, lately British Deputy High Commissioner, Georgetown.
- Professor James Hunter Lawrie. For services to medical education in Nigeria.
- Rudolph Lederer, M.B.E., lately Interpreter, European Commission, Brussels.
- Sally, Mrs. Leung Wong Cheukhung, M.B.E. For public and community services in Hong Kong.
- Malcolm John McArthur. For medical services to the community in Botswana.
- Norman Hamilton McMillan, lately First Secretary, British High Commission, Dhaka.
- George Bryan O'Rorke, Director, New Territories Development Department, Hong Kong.
- Colin William Perchard, British Council Representative, Zimbabwe.
- George Joseph Ian Rutherford. For services to the British community in Rio de Janeiro.
- William Barbour Smart. For services to British commercial and community interests in Bahrain.
- Miss Maria Tam Wai-chu. For public services in Hong Kong.
- Noel James Teale. For services to British commercial and community interests in Venezuela.
- William Tully. For services to plantation development in Malaysia.
- William Turnbull. For public and community services in Hong Kong.
- Keith John West. For services to civil engineering in Pakistan.
- Samuel Boyd Whittall. For services to British commercial interests in Canada.
- Alan Wolstenholme, lately First Secretary (Commercial), British Deputy High Commission, Calcutta.
- Wong Wan-tin, M.B.E. For services to the community in Hong Kong.
- Edward Jan Wygard. For services to British commercial interests in Mexico.

==== Member of the Order of the British Empire (MBE) ====
Military
Navy

- Lieutenant Commander Patrick James Ewings Bisset, Royal Navy
- Lieutenant (CS) Michael John Coles, Royal Navy
- Lieutenant Commander Joseph Domican, Royal Navy
- Fleet Chief Airman (AH) Leonard Eaton F976353K
- Lieutenant Commander Donald John Hillman, Royal Navy
- Lieutenant Commander (Acting Commander) Michael John Hunter, Royal Navy
- Lieutenant Commander Ian Latimer, Royal Navy
- Lieutenant Commander John Graham Aston Lea, Royal Navy
- Lieutenant Commander John Henry McDermott, Royal Navy
- Lieutenant Commander Michael John Marsh, Royal Navy
- Lieutenant Commander Frank Anthony Mason, Royal Naval Reserve
- Captain Derek Alick Oakley, Royal Marines
- Fleet Chief Marine Engineering Artificer (ML) Albert Victor Pitt K914553X
- Lieutenant Commander Peter Redpath, Royal Navy
- Lieutenant Commander John Scott, Royal Navy.
- Lieutenant Commander John Russell Storey, Royal Navy
- Fleet Chief Radio Supervisor (W.) John Charles Wise J942033W

Army

- Major Louis Charles Adkins CD (612 230 250), Royal Canadian Horse Artillery.
- Major Gerald Robert Akhurst (484809), Royal Regiment of Artillery.
- LS/22819319 Warrant Officer Class 1 Roger Michael ALLEN, Royal Tank Regiment.
- Major (now Lieutenant Colonel) Anthony Andereson CD (431 265 875), Princess Patricia's Canadian Light Infantry.
- 23722286 Warrant Officer Class 2 Mervyn Harry Beresford, Royal Corps of Signals.
- Major (Queen's Gurkha Officer) Bhimbahadur Rai (491274), 10th Princess Mary's Own Gurkha Rifles.
- Major (Director of Music) Donald Carson (498657), Royal Army Medical Corps.
- Major Michael Newton Carter (487463), Royal Regiment of Artillery.
- Captain William James Clark (507237), Royal Corps of Signals.
- Acting Major Robert Laurence Cooke (466491), Army Cadet Force, Territorial Army.
- 23965432 Warrant Officer Class 1 William Alfred George Coombes, Royal Corps of Signals, Territorial Army.
- Major Maurice Saunders Davies (479864), Royal Corps of Signals.
- Major David Robert Dixon (482718), The Gloucestershire Regiment
- Major Edward John Downham (477757), The Queen's Lancashire Regiment
- Major (Staff Quartermaster) Barry Trevor Eastwood (498048), Grenadier Guards (now RARO)
- Major Andrew John Clifford Fisher (488432), Royal Corps of Transport.
- Lieutenant (Acting Captain) Michael French (517982), Intelligence Corps.
- Captain Michael Edwin Garrod (514478), Royal Army Ordnance Corps.
- Captain (Garrison Engineer) John Philip Geany (506260), Corps of Royal Engineers.
- Major Peter Gibson (458697), Royal Army Ordnance Corps (now RARO).
- Captain Thomas Harrison (468445), Royal Corps of Transport, Territorial Army.
- Major (Queen's Gurkha Officer) Karnabahadur Thapa (488362), 2nd King Edward VII's Own Gurkha Rifles (The Sirmoor Rifles).
- Acting Major Horace Arthur Lovett, TD (441934), Combined Cadet Force, Territorial Army.
- Major Arthur William Merrick (489565), Royal Corps of Signals.
- 23990550 Warrant Officer Class 2 Keith Nicholson BEM, Royal Army Ordnance Corps.
- 23749940 Warrant Officer Class 1 Michael John Radford, Royal Corps of Signals.
- Major Peter ROBERTS (488365), Royal Army Medical Corps.
- 23208867 Warrant Officer Class 2 Edward Sloan, Royal Regiment of Artillery, Territorial Army.
- Major (Staff Quartermaster) Bernard Gerald Stevens BEM (497842), Royal Army Ordnance Corps.
- 23931895 Warrant Officer Class 2 Dennis John Tape, Corps of Royal Engineers.
- 23929388 Warrant Officer Class 2 (Acting Warrant Officer Class 1) John Taylor, Irish Guards.
- Major Ian James Thain TD (481232), 51st Highland Volunteers, Territorial Army.
- Major (Electrical Mechanical Assistant Engineer) Bernard Turnbull (497699), Corps of Royal Electrical and Mechanical Engineers.
- Major Christopher Michael Newbould Vere, TD (460659), Royal Regiment of Artillery, Territorial Army.
- Lieutenant Robert John Walker (518031), The Royal Irish Rangers (27th (Inniskilling) 83rd and 87th).
- 24018674 Warrant Officer Class 1 Dennis Weir, Royal Corps of Signals.
- Major (now Lieutenant Colonel) Hugh Earle Welby-Everard (476665), Royal Regiment of Artillery.
- Captain Stephen James Branford White (491023), Royal Tank Regiment.
- Captain (Adviser Infantry Weapons) Robert Kerr Wilson (515262), Small Arms School Corps.
- Captain Derek Granville Wood (508520), Royal Corps of Signals.
- LS/23506876 Warrant Officer Class 2 William Gilbert Wright, The Duke of Edinburgh's Royal Regiment (Berkshire and Wiltshire).

Air Force

- Squadron Leader Robin Harold Bamfield (593597), Royal Air Force.
- Squadron Leader Graham William Davies (312848), Royal Air Force Volunteer Reserve (Training).
- Squadron Leader Grant Grafton (8022603), Royal Air Force.
- Squadron Leader Stephen Graham Griffiths (608912), Royal Air Force.
- Squadron Leader John Michael Henson (4231507), Royal Air Force.
- Squadron Leader Alec Victor Heron (582366), Royal Air Force.
- Squadron Leader Laurence George Hummerstone (2442875), Royal Air Force Volunteer Reserve (Training).
- Squadron Leader John Stuart Kirk (4096419), Royal Air Force.
- Squadron Leader Christopher Wallace Pennell (4267557), Royal Air Force.
- Squadron Leader Roger David John Wheale (2617376), Royal Air Force.
- Squadron Leader John David McMurray Widdess (4232172), Royal Air Force.
- Flight Lieutenant James Gilpin (3126500), Royal Air Force (Retired).
- Warrant Officer John Walter Thomas Cooke (N4072985), Royal Air Force.
- Warrant Officer Albert Edward Cree (Y1922961), Royal Air Force.
- Warrant Officer Eunice Mary Davies (R2813579), Royal Air Force.
- Warrant Officer Idris Ivor Robert Davies (Y4126159), Royal Air Force.
- Warrant Officer William Dean (P3140252), Royal Air Force.
- Warrant Officer Geoffrey Sidney Peter Dimmer (C1921896), Royal Air Force.
- Warrant Officer Brian Barwell Haines (U4101546), Royal Air Force.
- Warrant Officer Michael Joseph Linnane (T4040424), Royal Air Force.
- Warrant Officer Michael George Shore (R0588743), Royal Air Force.
- Warrant Officer Alfred Derrick Wagstaff (H0583020), Royal Air Force.
- Warrant Officer Frank Stanhope Williams (W4003276), Royal Air Force.

Civil

- Geoffrey Forbes Adam, Chairman and Managing Director, R P Adam Ltd, Selkirk. For services to Export.
- Ernest Adams, Station Officer, Dorset Fire Brigade.
- Peter Norman Adams, National Officer, Electrical, Electronic, Telecommunications and Plumbing Union.
- Miss Mary Ann Adamson, Assistant Services Welfare Administrator (Overseas), Hong Kong BFPO 1, Women's Royal Voluntary Service.
- Bennie Duncan Matheson Affleck, Director, National Mobility Office.
- William Amslie, lately Member, North Eastern Electricity Consultative Council.
- Miss Jean Primrose Alexander. For Political Service.
- Miss Barbara Allen. For Political Service.
- Gloria Elaine Eunice, Mrs. Alsey, Organising Secretary, Cornwall Rural Community Council.
- Geraldine Mercy, Mrs. Amos, Founder and Director, Continuing Care Project.
- Rabbi Joseph Joshua Apfel. For services to the Jewish community in Leeds.
- Major Peter Arthur Buller Ashton, T.D., Chairman, Lambeth Unit, Sea Cadet Corps.
- James Bryan Ashworth, Chairman, Burnley and District Export Group. For services to Export.
- Lieutenant Commander James Lickus Atkinson, R.N.R. For services to the Methil Sea Cadet Corps.
- Samuel Alfred Terence Owen Aylott, lately Senior Executive Officer, Ministry of Defence.
- Lawrence Raymond Bailey, Senior Executive Officer, Board of Customs and Excise.
- Dennis Edgar Baker, Senior Air Traffic Engineer, London Air Traffic Control Centre.
- Patrick Chandler Gordon Ballingall. For Political Service.
- Marjorie Nellie, Mrs. Banfield. For services to the community in Cornwall.
- Cyril Ernest Barker, Head, Printing Department, Institution of Production Engineers.
- William Arthur Beanland, Superintendent Pharmacist, Rawtenstall Health Centre, Lancashire.
- David Leslie Ednie Beaumont, Product Manager, Cymbeline Radar, Thorn EMI Electronics Ltd. For services to Export.
- William Beesley, lately Chief Superintendent Merseyside Constabulary.
- Hilaire Benbow, D.S.C., Senior Committee Clerk in the Corporation of London.
- Barrington Bezant, Consumer Protection Officer, West Glamorgan County Council.
- David John Black, Executive Officer Grade I, Northern Ireland Office.
- Wilfred Blagg, Company Director, Brightside, Mechanical and Electrical Services Group.
- Donald George Booth, Secretary, Middlesex Group, Disabled Drivers' Association.
- John Stanley Coggon Boswell, Higher Executive Officer, Department of Health and Social Security.
- Elwyn Bowen, Headteacher, Goetre County Primary School.
- Alec Vernon Bradbury, Higher Executive Officer, Department of Health and Social Security.
- Jack Brearley, Head Government Butter Government Hospitality Fund.
- Miss Joanna Brendon, Director, St John's Smith Square, London. *Miss Marjorie Brereton, lately Director of Nursing Services (Community), Bloomsbury 3
- Zara, Mrs, Brickman, Executive Officer, Victoria and Albert Museum.
- Robert Brotherton, General Manager and Director, TSB Computer Services Ltd.
- Miss Helen Brown, lately Divisional Nursing Officer, Lanarkshire Health Board.
- Kenneth Brown, Adviser in Craft, Design and Technology, Shropshire Local Education Authority.
- Anthony Raymond Buckley, Chief Medical Adviser, British Gas Corporation.
- Roger Francis Taylor Bullivant. For services to music in Sheffield.
- Kathleen Norah, Mrs. Burgess, Catering Officer and Senior School Meals Organiser, Dudley Local Education Authority.
- Patrick Thomas Burgoyne, Higher Executive Officer, H.M. Stationery Office.
- Arthur Butcher, Clerk, Diocesan Registry, Carlisle.
- Miss Olive Ethel Butler. For Political Service.
- Betty Daphne, Mrs. Callaway-Fittall. For services to Ice Dancing.
- Ronald Duncan Cameron, lately Warden, University Hall, University College, Cardiff.
- David William Campbell, Assistant Firemaster, Strathclyde Fire Brigade.
- Margaret Allan, Mrs. Campbell, Executive Officer, National Savings Bank.
- Clifford Cartwright, T.D., Higher Executive Officer, Lord Chancellor's Department.
- Kenneth William Chandler, Head, Advanced Technology Branch, Systems Research Division, MRDE, National Coal Board.
- Richard Hugh McFarlane Cheetham, Chief Inspector, Avon and Somerset Constabulary.
- Joan Mary, Mrs. Christian, Organiser, Weston-super-Mare Citizens' Advice Bureau.
- Alan Frank Clark, Headmaster, Ocklynge County Junior School.
- Lieutenant Colonel Christopher Norman Clayden (Retd.), Retired Officer I, Ministry of Defence.
- Ronald Richard Clohier, Senior Executive Officer, Commonwealth War Graves Commission.
- Jeffrey Robert Clyne, General Medical Practitioner, Manchester.
- Frank Constable. For services to horticultural education.
- Miss Pamela Cook, Director, Cantamus Girl Choir, Mansfield.
- Ernest James Wapham Neville Cooper, Director, Business Development Zambia Engineering Services Ltd.
- Malcolm Douglas Cooper. For services to Shooting.
- Brian Richard Copp, lately Higher Executive Officer, Ministry of Defence.
- Eric Newton Corns. For services to the community in Amersham.
- Frank William Cottam, National Industria; Officer, General, Municipal, Boilermakers and Alied Trades Union.
- Jessie, Mrs. Coxon, lately Matron, Black Watch War Memorial Home, Dundee.
- Derek Douglas Cracknell, General Medical Practitioner, Huntingdon.
- Eric Creswell, Pipework Engineering Consultant, Aiton & Company Ltd.
- Harry Edward Crivan. For services to the community and race relations.
- Ian Cullens, Member, Scottish Agricultural Consultative Panel.
- Miss Isabella Wilson Cumming, Investment Manager, Small Business Division, Scottish Development Agency.
- Miss Daphne Marion Currie, Inspector (S), Board of Inland Revenue.
- Elisabeth Frances, Mrs. Cusworth. For Political Service.
- Sylvia May, Mrs. Daffern, lately Principal Officer, Home Help and Nightwatcher Services, West Midlands.
- Olive Margaret, Mrs. Daukes, lately Secretary, Wallingford and Didcot Division, SSAFA.
- Ena Mary, Mrs. Davies. For services to charity in South Pembrokeshire.
- Paul Edward John Davies, Inspector (S), Board of Inland Revenue.
- Douglas Davis, Professional and Technology Officer, Grade I, Technology Division, Winfrith, UKAEA.
- Sarah Pbilippa, Mrs. Davis, lately Sister, Tindal General Hospital, Aylesbury Vale Health Authority.
- Miss Eunice Lucy Daw, Higher Executive Officer, Overseas Development Administration.
- John Kenneth Dedmman, Chairman, Grocers' Federation Benevolent Fund.
- Rosemary Pamela, Mrs. Devonald, Senior Lecturer in Art Education, Bath College of Higher Education.
- Margaret Scott, Mrs. Dick, Chairman, Clarkston and District Committee for Cancer Research.
- Michael Edward Dingley, Professional and Technology Officer I, Department of the Environment.
- June Margaret, Mrs. Dooley, Works Controller, Severn-Trent Water Authority.
- Cyril Henry Holroyd Doveton, Executive Officer, Economic and Social Research Council.
- Miss Isabelle Fleming Morrison Drummond, Vice-President, Scottish Branch, British Red Cross Society.
- William Dunwoody. For services to the flute band movement.
- Alexander Fyvie Durward, Chairman, Grampian War Pensions Committee, Scotland.
- Neville Eastman, lately Chief Technologist, Stevenage Division, Dynamics Group, British Aerospace pic.
- Alfred Reginald Elder, Stores Officer Grade B, Ministry of Defence.
- Ralph Armitage Ellam, Inspector, Cambridgeshire Constabulary.
- John Michael Elliott, Manager, Bowmont Valley Farms.
- Philip William Charles Elliott, Higher Executive Officer, Lord Chancellor's Department.
- Harold Michael England. For services to Association Football particularly in Wales.
- John Evans, Professional arid Technology Officer I, Home Office.
- Alan Doyle Everett, General Medical Practi tioner. For services to the community in Leatherhead.
- Harold Isaac Fainlight. For services to the community in Lincolnshire.
- Miss Elizabeth Mary Farewell, Manager, The Willows Day Care Centre, Jersey.
- Alasdair Forbes Ferguson, D.S.C., Chairman, Sub-Commissioners of Pilotage, Poole District, Corporation of Trinity House.
- James Ferguson. For Political and Public Service.
- Frederick Fincher. For services to conservation in Worcestershire.
- Kenneth Malcolm Finding, Senior Executive Officer, Department of Employment.
- John Lanagan Sherington Flanagan, Headmaster, Bedale Church of England Primary School, North Yorkshire.
- Dulcie Vere, Mrs. Fletcher, Head, Primary Schools' Remedial Service, Wirral Local Education Authority.
- Michael Francis Forde, Chief Superintendent, Royal Ulster Constabulary.
- John Albert Foulser, lately Professional and Technology Officer I, Ministry of Defence.
- Joseph Trayton French. For Political Service.
- John Edward Fryer, Registrar and Secretary, Insurance Brokers' Registration Council.
- Miss Elizabeth Mary Gallagher, Assistant Director of Social Services, Western Health and Social Services Board, N.I.
- Miss Eileen Maud Gladys Gammon, Senior Personal Secretary, Department of Education and Science.
- Claudia Isabella Gray, Mrs. Gaw, Regional Officer, Northern Ireland Citizens' Advice Bureaux.
- Edward Patrick Geere, County Secretary (Essex) and Assistant Regional Secretary, Eastern Region, Abbeyfield Society.
- William Fenwick Gemmill. For Political and Public Service.
- Edmund Robert Giboney, Principal Public Health Inspector, Cookstown District, Co. Tyrone.
- Margaret Elizabeth, Mrs. Giles, Director, Isle of Wight Branch, British Red Cross Society.
- Kenneth John Godbeer, B.E.M., Driver, Department of the Environment.
- Anthony Stewart Goldstone, Chairman, Greater Manchester Youth Association.
- Horace John Edward Gooch, Divisional Director, The Constantine Group.
- John Osborne Gough, Managing Director, Kleeneze Holdings plc.
- Edward William Gould, Tax Officer (Higher Grade), Board of Inland Revenue.
- Herbert Douglas Victor Gould, Chief Inspector, Weapons Fuzing Division, Graseby Dynamics Ltd.
- Anthony Arthur Gracey, Inspector, National Society for the Prevention of Cruelty to Children, Belfast.
- Miss Agnes Wallace Graham. Member, Management Committee, Urmston Citizens' Advice Bureau.
- Kenneth Gwilliam, Manager, Krefeld Bakery, Navy, Army and Air Force Institutes.
- Percival Louis George Hann, Regional Collector, Board of Inland Revenue.
- Miss Ann Gertrude Harris, Secretary, Camphill Village Trust.
- Anthony John Harrison, Member, Food Advisory Committee.
- John Cannell Harrison, lately General Manager, Shoreham Port Authority.
- Miss Maureen Harrison, Fire Control Officer, Gwent Fire Brigade.
- June Sheila Edwina, Mrs. Hawkins, Higher Executive Officer, Department of Employment.
- Wilfred Donald Heath, Chief Safety Adviser, Jaguar Cars Ltd.
- Brian Stanley Helliwell, Head, Optical Fibre Systems Development Group, Plessey Telecommunications Research Ltd.
- Edith, Mrs. Henderson. For Political and Public Service.
- Miss Pamela Herbertson, lately Deputy General Secretary, Friends of the Elderly and Gentlefolk's Help.
- Susan Elizabeth, Mrs. Hewitt. For Political Service.
- James William Hill, Professional and Technology Officer I, Ministry of Defence.
- Sidney James Hill, Head of Careers Department, Kingsmead School, Wiveliscombe, Somerset.
- Harry Storr Hoggins, Director of Nursing Services, Cornwall and Isles of Scilly Health Authority.
- Donald, Edwin Holdsworth, Senior Executive Officer, Department of Employment.
- Richard David Hoskins, Member, National Gas Consumers' Council.
- Miss Joan Eva Houghton, Publicity Officer, Chester Marketing Bureau.
- Alan George Hunter, Manager, Prospects Agency Youth Training Scheme.
- Harry Horace, Hutchison, Training Services Officer Grade I, Department of Employment.
- Rosemary Eliot, Mrs. Hutton. For Political and Public Service.
- Leslie William Charles Irvine, Production Superintendent, Conoco (UK) Ltd.
- George Edward Irwin, Higher Executive Officer, Department of Health and Social Security.
- Miss Zoe Eason Irwin, Secretary, Northern Ireland Committee, Civil Service Benevolent Fund.
- Thomas Jackson, Superintendent, Royal Ulster Constabulary.
- The Reverend Frank Jennings. For charitable services.
- Dennis Johnson, Principal Energy Officer, Wirral Metropolitan Borough Council.
- David Aneurin Jones, lately Executive Officer, Forestry Commission.
- Eric Roberts Jones, lately Chairman, Transport Users' Consultative Committee for Wales.
- Owen Francis Joseph, Manager, Materials, Processes and Devices Laboratory, Marconi Research Centre, G.E.C. Research Labs.
- Aloysius Bernard Kaukas, Director, Environment, British Rail.
- Margaret Scott Graham, Mrs. Keates. For services to the Women's Trust Fund in Manchester.
- Miss Margaret Mary Josephine Kelly, Chief Superintendent of Typists, Department of the Environment for Northern Ireland.
- Joseph Thomas Patrick Kenny, B.E.M., Public Relations Officer, Ulster Bank Group.
- William Gerald George King, Senior Executive Officer, Ministry of Defence.
- Joan Alice, Mrs. Kirby, Joint County Organiser, Hampshire, Women's Royal Voluntary Service.
- David McCubbin Kirkwood, Superindent, Dumfries and Galloway Constabulary.
- Alwin Cameron Beatrice, Mrs. Latham, General Medical Practitioner, London.
- William Blyth Law, lately Chairman, Scottish Federation of Housing Associations.
- John Edward Lawrence, Chairman and Managing Director, JEL Energy Conservation Services Ltd.
- Harold Sandison Leask, Warden, Isleburgh House Youth and Community Centre, Lerwick.
- Olwen Jane, Mrs. Leebrook. For services to the community in Rhondda, Mid Glamorgan.
- John Leese, Food Information Officer (Scotland), Food from Britain.
- Marion Rosemary, Mrs. Lewis, Senior Personal Secretary, Agricultural and Food Research Council.
- Molly Edith, Mrs. Liberty, Sister in charge, St. Peters and St James Nursing Home, East Sussex.
- Alastair George Limont, Local Veterinary Inspector, Great Bookham, Surrey.
- Norman Thomas Lloyd-Jones. For Political Service.
- Stanley Robert Lowy, Managing Director, Unicorn Products Ltd. For services to Export.
- Abraham Sek-Tong Lue. For services to the Chinese community in London.
- Elsie Maud, Mrs. Luxton. For services to lace-making.
- Graham Selby Lyons, Superintendent, Metropolitan Police.
- Stanley Macdonald, Senior Registrar of Births, Deaths and Marriages, Perth.
- Nancy, Mrs. Maeer. For Political Service.
- Alexander Manson, Chairman and Managing Director, Mackay Group, Dingwall.
- Walter Martin. For services to the Scout Association in Manchester.
- Brian Middleton Massey, Chief Assistant (Traffic and Development), Somerset County Council.
- David Murray Maxton, Chairman and Managing Director, L. Gathier & Company. For services to Export.
- Miss Else Mitia Mayer-Lismann. For services to music education.
- Toni Montague Mazonowicz, Commodore Chief Engineer Officer, P & O Cruises Ltd.
- George Alexander McBride, Chief Inspector, Royal Ulster Constabulary.
- John Sidney McCarthy, Chairman, McCarthy and Stone plc.
- John Aylmer McDonald. For services to the community in Coleraine.
- Marie Louise, Mrs. McFarlane, Senior Executive Officer, Management and Personnel, Cabinet Office.
- Moira Gwendoline, Mrs. McKenzie, Tutor-Warden, Centre for Language in Primary Education, Inner London Education Authority.
- Miss Rosaleen Winifred McMullan, Tax Officer (Higher Grade), Board of Inland Revenue.
- Miss Carol Margaret McNeill. For services to Orienteering.
- Eva Langley, Mrs. Metcalfe, Higher Executive Officer, Privy Council Office.
- Gerald George Auguste Meyer, lately Editor, The Orcadian.
- Alexander Millar-Brown, Director, Norwich and Norfolk Chamber of Commerce and Industry.
- Angus William Millard, President, Drallim Industries Ltd.
- Leonard Dodsworth Minter, Professional and Technology Officer I. Department of the Environment.
- Graeme Sutherland Minto, Chairman and Managing Director, Domino Printing Sciences Ltd.
- Andrew Mitchell, Managing Director, Thorn E.M.I. Elstree Studios Ltd.
- Clifford Lely Mollison. For services to the Royal General Theatrical Fund Association.
- William John Monck, Conservator of Castle Eden Dene Nature Reserve, Ayclifle and Peterlee Development Corporation.
- Ronald Geoffrey Moon, Charge Nurse, Royal Earlswood Hospital, East Surrey Health Authority.
- Harry Russell Morley. For services to the community in Stockport
- Douglas Cecil Morris, General Manager, Bristol Old Vic Trust Ltd.
- James Morton, Section Buyer, Actuation Division, Lucas Aerospace Ltd.
- Hugh Mulloy, Member, Children's Panel for the Strathclyde Region.
- Noel John Mumford. For Political and Public Service.
- Muriel, Mrs. Murphy, Sister, David Lewis Northern Hospital, Liverpool Health Authority.
- Samuel Murphy, Mayor, Carrickfergus Borough Council.
- Miss Barbara Florence Nicholls, Senior Officer Grade 6, Housing Department, Greater London Council.
- Kenneth William Charles Nicholls, Marketing Director, Military Equipment, Vinten Group plc. For services to Export.
- William Macdonald Nicolson, lately Chairman. Skye and Lochalsh District Council.
- Leslie Nobbs, Higher Executive Officer, Department of Agriculture and Fisheries for Scotland.
- Roy Arthur Notley, Operations Manager, Shipping, British Steel Corporation.
- Emma Ceridwen Rees, Mrs. O'Donnell, President, Welsh Women's Hockey Association.
- Albert Owen. For services to the community in Llanerchymedd, Anglesey.
- Ivan Trevor Palmer, Second Engineer (Distribution), Eastern Electricity Board.
- Jack Parkington, lately Executive Officer, Department of Health and Social Security.
- Miss Iris Mary Parry. For services to the community in Bangor.
- Joseph Henry Pearson, Deputy Principal, Westminster College, London.
- John Pollard, Chairman, Advisory Committee, Reading Cattle Breeding Centre.
- William Emrys Haydn Price. For Political Service.
- Miss Josephine Mary Wedderburn Pullein-Thompson, Writer.
- Bernard Edwin Rastall, Chief Executive, Cannock Chase District Council.
- Miss Edith Betty Rea, Nursing Officer/Community Midwife, Winchester Health Authority.
- Bessie Sophia, Mrs. Read, Headmistress, Shoreside County Primary School, Southport.
- Basil Gordon Reitz. For services to the Royal Tournament.
- George Nicholas Edward Render, lately Chief Protocol Officer, Newcastle-upon-Tyne City Council.
- Betty Joan, Mrs. Richardson, Executive Officer, Department of the Environment.
- George Ritchie, Technical Adviser, Britoil plc.
- Miss Gladys Ethel Rivett, Senior Personal Secretary, Cabinet Office.
- Ronald Francis Roberts, Valuation Clerk (Higher Grade), Board of Inland Revenue.
- Kenneth Robert Rogers, Managing Director, Sperrin Textiles Ltd, Coleraine.
- Miss Patricia Rose, Nursing Officer, Theatres and Intensive Care Therapy Unit, City Hospital, Derby.
- Wilfred George Henry Salway, Senior Executive Officer, Department of Health and Social Security.
- Leonard Albert Sanders, Teacher, H.M. Prison, Wandsworth.
- Betty, Mrs. Saxby. For services to the community in Northamptonshire.
- Arthur Scargill, Collector (Higher Grade), Board of Inland Revenue.
- Peter Westcott Setten, Chairman and Joint Managing Director, Setten and Durward Ltd.
- Miss Catherine Elizabeth Seymour, Local Officer I, Department of Health and Social Security.
- David Shankland, Nurse Tutor, Dumfries and Galloway Health Board.
- Fateh Mohammed Sharif. For services to the Pakistani community in Scotland, particularly in Glasgow.
- Frederick Charles Shenston. For services to conservation in Windsor.
- Miss Margaret Eliza Shinie, lately Secretary, Scottish Committee, National Federation of Music Societies.
- George Wilfred Simpson, Voluntary Scientific Adviser, Cambridgeshire County Council.
- Miss Julia Ann Sinnott, Director, Nursing and Community Health Services, West Glamorgan Health Authority.
- Ann Elizabeth, Mrs. Smith, Higher Executive Officer, Board of Customs and Excise.
- Frances Maud, Mrs. Smith, Divisional Emergency Services Adviser, South East, Women's Royal Vol untary Service.
- Hubert James Smith, Field Training Manager, RHM Foods Ltd.
- Ronald Ernest Smith, Higher Executive Officer, Home Office.
- Ronald Joseph Smith, Head of Telemetry Group, Defence Systems Division, Thorn EMI Electronics Ltd.
- Ena Marie, Mrs. Stacey. For Political and Public Service in Devon.
- Edith Millicent Olga, Mrs. Stark, Higher Executive Officer, Ministry of Defence.
- Miss Edith Gwendoline Stephens. For Political and Public Service.
- Enid May, Mrs. Stevens, lately Nursing Officer, Seacroft Hospital, Leeds Eastern Health Authority.
- John Stevenson. For services to local government in West Derbyshire.
- Miss Marjorie Elizabeth Tait, Personal Secretary, Department of Employment.
- Joyce May, Mrs. Tandy, lately Senior Residential Social Worker, The C. of E. Children's Society Home, St. Mary's, Eastnor.
- Kenneth Edward Tayler, Professional and Technology Officer I, Ministry of Defence.
- Anthony Taylor, Deputy Headteacher, Old Hall School, Rotherham.
- Clifford James Taylor, Foreign and Commonwealth Office.
- David George Taylor, Director, Road Safety, British School of Motoring.
- Herbert Taylor. For Political and Public Service.
- Honour Marie Marguerite, Mrs. Taylor. For services to the community in Blandford, Dorset.
- Philip Taylor, Works Engineering and Health and Safety Manager, Manchester Division Aircraft Group, British Aerospace.
- Thomas Hamilton Taylor, Member, National Advisory Council on Employment of Disabled People.
- Miss Edna Mary Tebbitt, lately Higher Executive Officer, Ministry of Agriculture, Fisheries and Food.
- James William Telfer. For services to Rugby Football, in Scotland.
- Albert Harold Terris, lately Commandant Metropolitan Special Constabulary.
- Frank Edward Theaker. For services to local government in Cheshire.
- Edward Thomas. For services to Boxing.
- Richard Howell Thomas, Superintendent, South Wales Constabulary.
- Thomas Stanley Thomas, Chairman, Peter's Savoury Products Ltd.
- Eric Herriot Thomson. For services to the community in Bonnyrigg, Midlothian.
- Percy John Thrower. For services to gardening.
- Major Eric Tory, T.D. For services to the community in Surrey.
- John Trainor, Senior Investigation Officer, Board of Customs and Excise.
- Michael Graham Tredgett. For services to Badminton.
- Herbert Trenholm. For services to Sport in the North East.
- Constance, Mrs. Turner, Matron, Teesside Cheshire Home for the Sick.
- John Tyrrell, Farmer, Inkberrow, Worcester.
- Inder Singh Uppal, Senior Community Relations Officer, Hounslow.
- Cuthbert Waggott, Secretary, Derwent Valley District, Aged Miners' Homes Committee.
- Dorothy May, Mrs. Walker, Senior Superintendent of Typists, Department of Trade and Industry.
- Henry Wallwin, Training Service Officer III, Department of Economic Development, Northern Ireland.
- Miss Birdie Alice Warshaw. For services to deaf people, particularly in London.
- Phyllis Hilda, Mrs. Watkins. For Political and Public Service.
- Brian Munro Watt, Port Naval Auxiliary Officer, North East Scotland, Royal Navy Auxiliary Service.
- Geoffrey Webb, Member, Oldham Metropolitan Borough Council.
- Kathleen Matilda, Mrs. Webb. For Political and Public Service.
- Charles Allan Webster, Managing Director, Highwood Guards Ltd.
- Horace Neville Wells-Cole. For services to local government in Norfolk.
- Robin Cedric Whiffen, Engineering Services Manager, George Wimpey International Ltd.
- Miss Irene Lilian White. For Political Service.
- William Balfour White, Project Manager, Yarrow Shipbuilders Ltd.
- William Lawrence John White, Works Assistant, Chief Signals and Telecommunications Engineer's Department, Southern Region, British Rail.
- Margaret, Mrs. Whitson, County Organiser, Cumbria, Women's Royal Voluntary Service.
- Lars Elof Wiberg, Technical Director, EPS (Research and Development) Ltd.
- Graham Roy Willes, lately Executive Officer, Ministry of Agriculture, Fisheries and Food.
- Alfred James Williams, Vice-President, Suffolk Preservation Society
- Illtyd Arron Williams, Show Director, Pembrokeshire Agricultural Society.
- Roger Matthew Williams, Chief Operating Manager, York, Eastern Region, British Rail.
- William Kenneth Williams. For Political and Public Service.
- Joan Iris, Mrs. Wilson, Clerical Officer, Department of Health and Social Security.
- Mabel, Mrs. Wilson. For services to the community in Todmorden, Lancashire.
- Alice Emily, Mrs. Wood, Executive Officer, Department of Trade and Industry.
- Douglas George Wood, Area Pharmacist, Bristol and Weston Health Authority.
- Elvin Brian Wood, Headmaster, Mount Pleasant Junior School, Huddersfield.
- Frank Edward Woodbridge, Regional Education Officer, Northern Region, Trades Union Congress.
- Ronald Alan Woods. For services to Westminster Abbey.
- Miss Hazel Elizabeth Wright, Senior Typist/ Clerk, Fire Authority for Northern Ireland.
- Miss Elsie Fenwick Young, Area Welfare Officer, Newcastle, Eastern Region, British Rail.

=== Imperial Service Order ===
==== Companion ====
- Kenneth Bryant, lately Senior Principal Scientific Officer, Ministry of Defence.
- Peter Frank Chambers, Senior Principal, HM Treasury.
- Lowry Sinclair Duncan, Senior Principal, Department of the Environment for Northern Ireland.
- Gerald William Edridge, lately Principal Professional and Technology Officer, Ministry of Defence.
- Eric Hall, Chief Services Liaison Officer, Ministry of Defence.
- John Ainsworth Harrison, Principal, Department of the Environment.
- Vivian Benson Hill, lately Chief Clerk, Cardiff Crown Court.
- Stewart William Colin Horne, Principal, Department of Health and Social Security.
- John Leslie Isom, Principal, Crown Estate Office.
- Douglas Valentine Jackson, Senior Principal Scientific Officer, Department of Trade and Industry.
- Arthur Henry William Kennard, Principal Examiner, Patent Office.
- William George Lawrence, lately Senior Principal, Ministry of Defence.
- Robert Underwood Lewis, Area Works Officer, Aberdeen Property Services Agency, Department of the Environment.
- Frederick Richard Littler, Principal Clerk to the Traffic Commissioner, Department of Transport.
- Walter Hay Miller, Principal, Department of Education and Science.
- Harry St Clair Moffatt, Chief Engineer, Ministry of Defence.
- Miss Jessie Patricia Morgan, Prmcipal Research Officer, Ministry of Agriculture, Fisheries and Food.
- Edward Kenneth Pyle, Assistant Collector, Board of Customs and Excise.
- James Russell, Senior Principal, Department of Health and Social Security.
- Ernest Francis Smith, Senior Principal, Board of Inland Revenue.
- Miss Margaret Vivien Wakefield-Richmond, lately Principal, Home Office.
- John Lithgow Williams, Foreign and Commonwealth Office.
- Thomas Winwick, Principal, Scottish Office.
- Kenneth Henry Arthur Witchell, Foreign and Commonwealth Office.

== Diplomatic Service and Overseas ==
=== Knight Bachelor ===
- James Edmund Sandford Fawcett DSC - lately Member of the European Commission of Human Rights, Strasbourg.

=== Order of St Michael and St George ===
==== Knight Grand Cross ====
- Sir Michael Butler KCMG, United Kingdom Permanent Representative to the European Communities, Brussels.

==== Knight Commander ====
- Derek Malcolm Day CMG, British High Commissioner-designate, Ottawa.
- John Redvers Freeland CMG, Legal Adviser, Foreign and Commonwealth Office.
- Peregrine Alexander Rhodes CMG, HM Ambassador, Athens.
- Patrick Richard Henry Wright CMG, Foreign and Commonwealth Office.

==== Companion ====
- Arthur John Coles, Foreign and Commonwealth Office.
- Brian James Proetel Fall, lately Foreign and Commonwealth Office.
- Anthony Gerald Hurrell, HM Ambassador, Kathmandu.
- Michael Romilly Heald Jenkins, Foreign and Commonwealth Office.
- David Montgomery, OBE, lately British Deputy High Commissioner, Bridgetown.
- Miss Catherine Eva Pestell, Minister (Economic) HM Embassy, Bonn.
- David John Edward Ratford, CVO, Minister, HM Embassy, Moscow.
- Colum John Sharkey, MBE, HM Ambassador, Tegucigalpa.
- William Roger Tomkys, HM Ambassador, Bahrain.
- Francis Sidney Edward Trew, British High Commissioner, Belmopan.
- Eric Victor Vines, OBE, HM Ambassador, Maputo.
- George Hannam Webb, OBE, Foreign and Commonwealth Office.

=== Order of the British Empire ===
==== Knight Commander ====
Civil Division

- John Campbell Moberly CMG - HM Ambassador, Baghdad.

==== Commander ====
Civil Division

- Douglas Alexander Beaton. For services to British commercial and community interests in Singapore.
- William Leonard Booker, lately United Nations Economic Commission for Africa, Addis Ababa.
- Hilton Cheong-Leen OBE. For public services in Hong Kong.
- Lewis Mervyn Davies CMG OBE, Secretary Government Secretariat, Hong Kong.
- Richard Bostock Dorman, British High Commissioner, Vila.
- Arnold Adamir Matthey, lately International Telecommunication Union (ITU), Geneva.
- Professor Denis William Stevens. For services to British cultural interests in the United States.
- Kenneth William Wright OBE. For services to British commercial interests in Australia.

==== Officer ====
Civil Division

- Aubrey Norman Beaumont - For services to agricultural development in Zambia.
- Anthony James Bird - For services to the British community in Portugal.
- Dr. Roger George Bowers - For services to education in Egypt.
- Charles Christopher Higgins Burne - For services to British commercial interests in Australia.
- Dr. James Michael Cairns - For services to medicine and the community in Zambia.
- Charles McKenzie Chadwick - British Council Representative, Canada.
- Chan Kam-chuen - For public services in Hong Kong.
- Richard Billing Dearlove - First Secretary, HM Embassy, Paris.
- Colonel Bernard Alfred Edridge MBE (Retd.) - For services to British commercial and community interests in Greece.
- Colin William Gresham Endacott - For services to British commercial interests in Singapore.
- Victor Ghio - For public services in Gibraltar.
- John Havelock Girling - For services to commerce and the community in Papua New Guinea.
- Anthony Hugh Grainger - For services to British commercial interests in Belgium.
- Neville Harrison Green - For services to British commercial interests in Malaysia.
- David Peter Love Harper - For services to education in Saudi Arabia.
- Henry Mollison Hogg - For services to civil engineering in Sri Lanka.
- Graham Lankford - lately British Deputy High Commissioner, Georgetown.
- Professor James Hunter Lawrie - For services to medical education in Nigeria.
- Rudolph Lederer MBE - lately Interpreter, European Commission, Brussels.
- Sally, Mrs. Leung Wong Cheukhung MBE - For public and community services in Hong Kong.
- Malcolm John McArthur - For medical services to the community in Botswana.
- Norman Hamilton McMillan - lately First Secretary, British High Commission, Dhaka.
- George Bryan O'Rorke - Director, New Territories Development Department, Hong Kong.
- Colin William Perchard - British Council Representative, Zimbabwe.
- George Joseph Ian Rutherford - For services to the British community in Rio de Janeiro.
- William Barbour Smart - For services to British commercial and community interests in Bahrain.
- Miss Maria Tam Wai-chu - For public services in Hong Kong.
- Noel James Teale - For services to British commercial and community interests in Venezuela.
- William Tully - For services to plantation development in Malaysia.
- William Turnbull - For public and community services in Hong Kong.
- Keith John West - For services to civil engineering in Pakistan.
- Samuel Boyd Whittall - For services to British commercial interests in Canada.
- Alan Wolstenholme - lately First Secretary (Commercial), British Deputy High Commission, Calcutta.
- Wong Wan-tin MBE - For services to the community in Hong Kong.
- Edward Jan Wygard - For services to British commercial interests in Mexico.

==== Member ====
Civil Division

- David Gray Alexander - lately HM Consul, Las Palmas, Canary Islands.
- Reginald William Avery - Administration Assistant, HM Embassy, Dublin.
- Henry Au Kwong-man - Regional Social Welfare Officer, New Territories, Hong Kong.
- Miss Judith Mary Barber - Personal Secretary, HM Embassy, Paris.
- Charles Ernest Been - Permanent Secretary, Chief Minister's Office, Turks and Caicos Islands.
- Phyllis, Mrs. Belcher - For services to the British community in Rio de Janeiro.
- Miss Sheila Bennett - lately International Staff, NATO Brussels.
- Miss Phyllis Daisy Bontoft BEM Telephone Supervisor, HM Embassy, Paris.
- Miss Eunice Netta Brown - Vice-Consul (Commercial), HM Consulate-General, Chicago.
- Miss Anne Burt - lately Personal Assistant to HM Ambassador, Jakarta.
- Sydney Augustus Charles CPM - Deputy Commissioner of Police, Montserrat.
- Sister Lulu Mary Berard Clay - For educational and welfare services to the community in Nigeria.
- Miss Heather Elizabeth Conynham - Second Secretary, HM Embassy, Caracas.
- Anthony Harry James Cornwell - lately Passport Officer, British High Commission, Canberra.
- Rameshchandra Manilal Desai - For services to the community in Nairobi.
- Archibald Leon Eve - For public and community services in Bermuda.
- Richard Patrick Ffrench - For educational and welfare services to the community in Trinidad.
- Miss Rebecca Gabay - Superintendent Radiographer, Medical Department, Gibraltar.
- Jean, Mrs. Gallagher - For welfare services to the handicapped in Bermuda.
- Christopher John Robert Grapes - For services to British educational and cultural interests in Finland.
- John Harrison - lately Second Secretary (Accountant). HM Embassy, Bonn.
- Alan Holmes - First Secretary (Commercial), HM Embassy, Jedda.
- Thomas Ashbert Hurlston - For public and community services in the Cayman Islands.
- Miss Marie-Claire Jackson - For services to the British community in Ghent, Belgium.
- Brian Maxwell Kelly - lately Assistant Commissioner of Inland Revenue, Hong Kong.
- John Philip Kelly - Second Secretary, British High Commission, Grenada.
- John Herd Law - Consular Clerk, HM Embassy, Athens.
- William Ormiston Lawrie - Vice-Consul, British Consulate-General, Geneva.
- Joseph Liu Hing-chai - For public services in Hong Kong.
- Maximilian Ma Yung-kit - For community services in Hong Kong.
- Joseph Desmond Macadam - For services to the British community in Peru.
- Norman McCann - For services to the British community in the United Arab Emirates.
- Elizabeth Ludlow, Mrs. Mackenzie = For services to the British community in Santiago.
- The Reverend Angus Thow MacKnight MVO - For services to the British community in Brussels.
- Miss Muriel Mason McCrindle - Notifications Clerk, Administration Department, HM Embassy, Washington.
- Anthony John McCulloch - For services to Anglo-Brazilian cultural relations in São Paulo.
- William Howard Mills - Speaker, Legislative Council, Turks and Caicos Islands.
- John Bryan Moorby - Second Secretary (Administration), HM Embassy, Oslo.
- Doris Anne Crichton, Mrs. Morgan - For welfare services to the community in Kenya.
- James Moss - For services to the development of the tobacco industry in Paraguay.
- Ng Chan-lam - For Community services in Hong Kong.
- Victor Lewis Parker - lately Vice-Consul, HM Embassy, Stockholm.
- Theodora Edm6e, Mrs. Pearce - For welfare services to the British community in Paris.
- Alfred Glenton Preston - For services to civil engineering in Ankara.
- Michael Anstruther Ramsay - lately Interpreter, International Staff, NATO, Brussels.
- Norman Jack Rogers - lately Second Secretary (Communications), British High Commission, New Delhi.
- Jean Margaret, Mrs. Rommes-Joice - For services to Anglo-Netherlands relations in Utrecht.
- Cynthia Loveday, Mrs. Ryan - For services to the British community in Houston, U.S.A.
- Simon James Scarff - For services to the British community in New Delhi.
- Miss Wynifred Sheerin - For services to ex-servicemen in Ireland.
- Thomas Taylor Sherry - For services to civil aviation in Kenya.
- Sit Dok-shuen - Senior Housing Manager, Housing Department, Hong Kong.
- George Ronald Smith - For services to the British community in the Netherlands.
- Ray Sonin - For services to the British community in Toronto.
- Haydn Jones Thomas - For services to agricultural development in the Sudan.
- Robert Wei Wen-nan QC - For public services in Hong Kong.
- John White - For services to youth training in Saudi Arabia.
- Ivor Carl Winnan - Administration Officer, British Council, Nigeria.
- Wong, Pak-keung - Senior Interpreter, Customs and Excise Service, Hong Kong.
- Vincent Woo Wing-fai - For community services in Hong Kong.
- Stanley James Young - Vice-Consul, HM Embassy, Washington.
- Valerie, Mrs. Zaoui - Vice-Consul, HM Embassy Tunis.

=== Imperial Service Order ===
==== Companion ====
- Chiu Sze-hung - Assistant Director of Accounting, Hong Kong.
- Stephen Chi-kin Law - Assistant Director of Social Security, Hong Kong.
- Gordon Eric Mather - Deputy Secretary, Education Department, Hong Kong.
- Pang Yuk-ling - Deputy Director of Housing, Hong Kong.

=== British Empire Medal ===
Military Division

- Flight Sergeant Kam Chung-keung - Royal Hong Kong Auxiliary Air Force.

Civil Division

- Chan Ping-cheung - Assistant Officer Class 1, Prisons Department, Hong Kong.
- Harry Erskine Francis - lately Wireless Operator, Cable and Wireless plc, Turks and Caicos Islands.
- Angelina, Mrs. Hunt - Senior Personal Secretary, Trade Development Department, Hong Kong.
- Joseph Jurado - Barrack Inventory Accountant, Property Services Agency, Gibraltar.
- John Hezekiah Rodney - Sergeant, Royal Montserrat Police Force.
- Joseph Bartholomew Rodriguez - Clerical Officer, Finance Department, Gibraltar.
- Tsang Wing-kin - Senior Clerical Officer, Urban Services Department, Hong Kong.
- Earle Overton Wood - Assistant Collector, Customs Department, Cayman Islands.
- Yip Kwok-yi - Chief Customs Officer, Customs and Excise Service, Hong Kong.
- Yuen Kee - Chief Technical Officer, Building Development Department, Hong Kong.

== Australia ==
=== Knight Bachelor ===
Queensland

- Ian McFarlane (Australian businessman) - For service to the community.

=== Order of St Michael and St George ===
==== Knight Commander ====
Queensland

- Johannes Bjelke-Petersen, Premier of Queensland.

=== Order of the British Empire ===
==== Commander ====
Civil Division
Queensland

- Dr. Felix Wilfred Arden - For service to Paediatrics
- Professor John Frederick Adrian Sprent - For services to Education and Science.

Tasmania

- Robert Mather - For public service.

==== Officer ====
Civil Division
Queensland

- Daniel Thomas James Gleeson - For service to local government.
- Noel John Heywood - For service to the community.
- Lester Todd Padman - For service to the community.
- Henry Jardine Parkinson - For service to education.

Tasmania

- Hugh William Duncan Loane - For services the community.

==== Member ====
Civil Division
Queensland

- Douglas James Adam - For service to youth.
- Keith Brough - For service to the community.
- Ronald Bruce Clelland - For service to the racing industry.
- Ivan John Despot - For service to the community.
- James Linnigan Fisher - For service to the community.
- Miss Bernardine Hanman - For public service.
- Allan James Hockey - For service to Aboriginal people.
- Billy Boyne Robinson DFC - For service to local government.
- Miss Wendy May Turnbull - For services to tennis.

Tasmania

- John Stanley Barnett - For service to the community.
- James Hugh Ashton Warner - For service to the community.

=== Imperial Service Order ===
Tasmania

- Glenn Edward Cornelius McKercher - For public service.

=== British Empire Medal ===
Civil Division
Queensland

- Miss Isabella Bryce - For services to the community.
- Miss Phyllis Edna Bryce - For services to the community.
- Norma Jean, Mrs. Fox - For service to the community.
- Dorothy Sarah, Mrs. Gallagher - For service to the community.
- Myrtle, Mrs. Greenway-Smith - For services to the community.
- Ramsay Hastie - Superintendent of Police.
- Percy Roy Hoffman - For service to the community.
- Marion Joyce, Mrs. Jensen - For services to the community.
- Margarita Giovanna Maria, Mrs. Sawdy - For service to the community.
- Catherine Margaret, Mrs. Schmidt - For services to the Mater Hospital.

Tasmania

- Ian Gladstone Leigh Bishop - For service to sport.
- Cyril Lance Newett - For service to the community.
- Miss Nathalie Faye Norris - For services to the community.

== Cook Islands ==
=== British Empire Medal (BEM) ===
Civil Division

- The Reverend Isaiah Willie. For services to the Cook Islands, especially the Cook Islands Christian Church.
