= Jim Keogh (banker) =

English banker

Patrick James Keogh, MC was an English banker. He was principal of the Bank of England's Discount Office from 1967 to 1974 during the British secondary banking crisis of the early 1970s. In 1974 he took early retirement after being blamed for failing to foresee the crisis.

The Bank of England (left) seen about the time that Keogh joined.

== Biography ==
Keogh joined the Bank of England in 1937. His career at the bank was interrupted by the outbreak of the Second World War, during which he served in The Gordon Highlanders (Aberdeen). In 1943 he was awarded the Military Cross for his leadership under fire on the Catania plain, Sicily, when he rallied his men and achieved his objective after his unit came under heavy shelling despite being severely injured himself. The wound he received continued to trouble him throughout his life.

Keogh was the United Kingdom's alternate executive director for the International Monetary Fund from 1955 to 1956. From 1959 to 1964, he was deputy chief of establishment at the Bank of England and deputy chief cashier from 1964 to 1967.

Keogh worked for the Bank of England at a time when financial regulation was relatively loose and the attitude of the bank fairly libertarian. When the Euromarkets were being established he told Russell Taylor, who was setting up consortium bank Italian International Bank, that he could do whatever he wished as long as he didn't "do it in the streets and frighten the horses."

Keogh was principal of the Bank of England's Discount Office from 1967 to 1974 during the time of the British secondary banking crisis of 1973–75. He was involved in launching a rescue plan but was blamed by some for failing to foresee the crisis and took early retirement in December 1974. He then went to work for the Monetary Authority of Singapore which had recently been established.

Keogh married Winifred Amy Gray in 1940 and they had sons Anthony and Simon.

== See also ==
- Hilton Clarke
