= Lord Barber =

Lord Barber may refer to:

- Anthony Barber, Baron Barber (1920–2005), British Conservative politician, Chancellor of the Exchequer from 1970 to 1974
- Brendan Barber, Baron Barber of Ainsdale (born 1951), British trade unionist
- Michael Barber, Baron Barber of Chittlehampton (born 1955), British teacher and civil servant
- Derek Barber, Baron Barber of Tewkesbury (1918–2017), British agriculturist and civil servant
