= Jack Rumbold =

New Zealand cricketer, Royal Navy officer, barrister, colonial administrator

Sir Jack Rumbold QC
Personal information
- Full name: Jack Seddon Rumbold
- Born: 5 March 1920; Reefton, West Coast, New Zealand
- Died: 9 December 2001 (aged 81); Westminster, London, England
- Batting: Right-handed

Domestic team information
- Years: Team
- 1946–1947: Oxford University

Career statistics
Competition	First-class
Matches	7
Runs scored	175
Batting average	12.50
100s/50s	–/–
Top score	25
Catches/stumpings	6/–
- Source: Cricinfo, 8 July 2020

Sir Jack Seddon Rumbold QC (5 March 1920 – 9 December 2001) was a New Zealand first-class cricketer, Royal Navy officer, barrister and colonial administrator. A great-nephew of Richard Seddon, the former Prime Minister of New Zealand, Rumbold was the youngest New Zealander to be awarded a Rhodes Scholarship to the University of Oxford. He served in the Royal New Zealand Naval Volunteer Reserve and after completing his officer training, the Royal Navy, in the service of which he was mentioned in dispatches.

He later had a legal career with the British Colonial Service in East Africa, advising the governments of Kenya and Zanzibar, surviving the 1962 revolution in the latter. After a brief academic career, which saw him become the first academic director of the British campus of Stanford University, he resumed his legal career with the Industrial Tribunals, for which he was knighted in 1984.

== Early life and military service ==
Rumbold was born on the South Island at Reefton in March 1920. His father was a headmaster, while his mother was a piano teacher. Her uncle was the former Prime Minister of New Zealand Richard Seddon. Rumbold was educated at St Andrew's College, Christchurch where his interests included rugby, cricket and poetry. He was head choirboy at Christchurch Cathedral. From St Andrew's he read law at the University of Canterbury, graduating in 1940. He became the youngest New Zealander to be awarded a Rhodes Scholarship to the University of Oxford, but this was deferred due to a combination of his young age and the Second World War.

Rumbold enlisted in the Royal New Zealand Naval Volunteer Reserve and in 1941 he was accepted for officer training in England at the Royal Naval College, Greenwich. Upon graduating he joined the destroyer HMS Inglefield, serving as a sub-lieutenant in the Arctic convoys. In 1943, he served aboard Inglefield during the Sicily campaign. He survived the ships sinking in February 1944 during Operation Shingle and was the last man to abandon ship, helping other crew men to evacuate, for which he was mentioned in dispatches. Following the sinking, he was appointed flag lieutenant to Rear-Admiral Gerald Dickens, serving with him in North Africa, Brussels and The Hague.

== Oxford University and early career ==
Following the war he was demobilised and took up his Rhodes Scholarship at Brasenose College, Oxford. While studying at Oxford, he played first-class cricket for Oxford University, captained by the New Zealander Martin Donnelly, with Rumbold making eight appearances in 1946–47. He scored 175 runs in his eight matches as an opening batsman, at an average of 12.50 and a high score of 25. He gained a cricket blue and played rugby for Oxford University RFC, though the pressures of his studies limited his rugby appearances and so he did not gain a second blue.

After graduating, Rumbold was called to the bar as a member of the Inner Temple. Having contemplated joining the Sudan Political Service, he decided against, with family ties bringing him back to New Zealand where he practiced at Wanganui as a barrister and solicitor, before becoming a crown prosecutor. After almost a decade in New Zealand, he applied for the Colonial Service in 1957, gaining a position as a Queen's Counsel in Kenya. There he gained the admiration of conservationist and chief game warden Lyn Temple-Boreham, with the two undertaking a number of expeditions to the Maasai Mara. He was a legal draftsman in the office of the Attorney General of Kenya from 1961, taking part in the Lancaster House Conferences which paved the way for Kenyan independence.

== Zanzibar Revolution and later life ==
Following Kenyan independence, Rumbold was appointed Queen's Counsel and Attorney General of Zanzibar. At that stage Zanzibar was a British protectorate on the verge of full independence, he was tasked with preparing a constitution for the soon to be independent state. However, his work was in vain as the Zanzibar Revolution took place in January 1964, overthrowing the Sultan Jamshid bin Abdullah, with Rumbold and his family fleeing aboard a yacht to Tanganyika. The new ruler of Zanzibar, Abeid Karume, invited Rumbold to resume his post, but he declined and instead settled in Nairobi where he advised the Ministry of Legal and Constitutional Affairs in its preparations to transition Kenya into a republic.

While in Kenya, he ran the government law school, which later became the law faculty of the University of East Africa. He returned to England in 1966, where he became the first academic director of the British campus of Stanford University. His legal career progressed to his involvement in industrial tribunals, where he was their part-time chairman in 1968, before becoming their full-time chairman in 1972. Among the cases he presided over included that of Pakistani cricketer Younis Ahmed, who had claimed unfair dismissal when he was not offered a new contract by Surrey in 1979. Rumbold was knighted in the 1984 Birthday Honours, He retired in 1984 and in later life he divided his time between London and Tuscany with his second wife, Veronica, whom he had married in 1970, following his divorce from his first wife in 1969. Rumbold died in December 2001.
