= Peter Harrop =

British civil servant (1926–2020)

Sir Peter John Harrop, KCB (18 March 1926 – 10 September 2020) was a British civil servant.

== Background ==
Born on 18 March 1926, Harrop attended Peterhouse, Cambridge, before serving in the Royal Naval Volunteer Reserve for three years until 1948. He then entered HM Civil Service in 1949 as an official in the Ministry of Town and Country Planning, and served in its successors until 1973, when he left the Department of the Environment (DoE) to work in HM Treasury.

In 1977, Harrop returned to the DoE as a Deputy Secretary and served there until 1986 (except for a period in the Cabinet Office from 1979 to 1980); he was Second Permanent Secretary from 1981 to 1986. After the 1981 Toxteth riots, he was the most senior official sent with the Secretary of State, Michael Heseltine, to work in Liverpool for over two weeks and develop policies to prevent recurrences of violence. Harrop personally inspected housing in Netherley, an area suffering from considerable housing deprivation but spared the rioting which blighted Toxteth. For his public service, Harrop was appointed a Companion of the Order of the Bath in the 1980 Birthday Honours and promoted to Knight Commander in the 1984 Birthday Honours.

After leaving the civil service, he was chairman of the National Bus Company from 1988 to 1991 and a director of various companies. He died on 10 September 2020.
