= Joan Seccombe, Baroness Seccombe =

British politician

The Right Honourable The Baroness Seccombe DBE
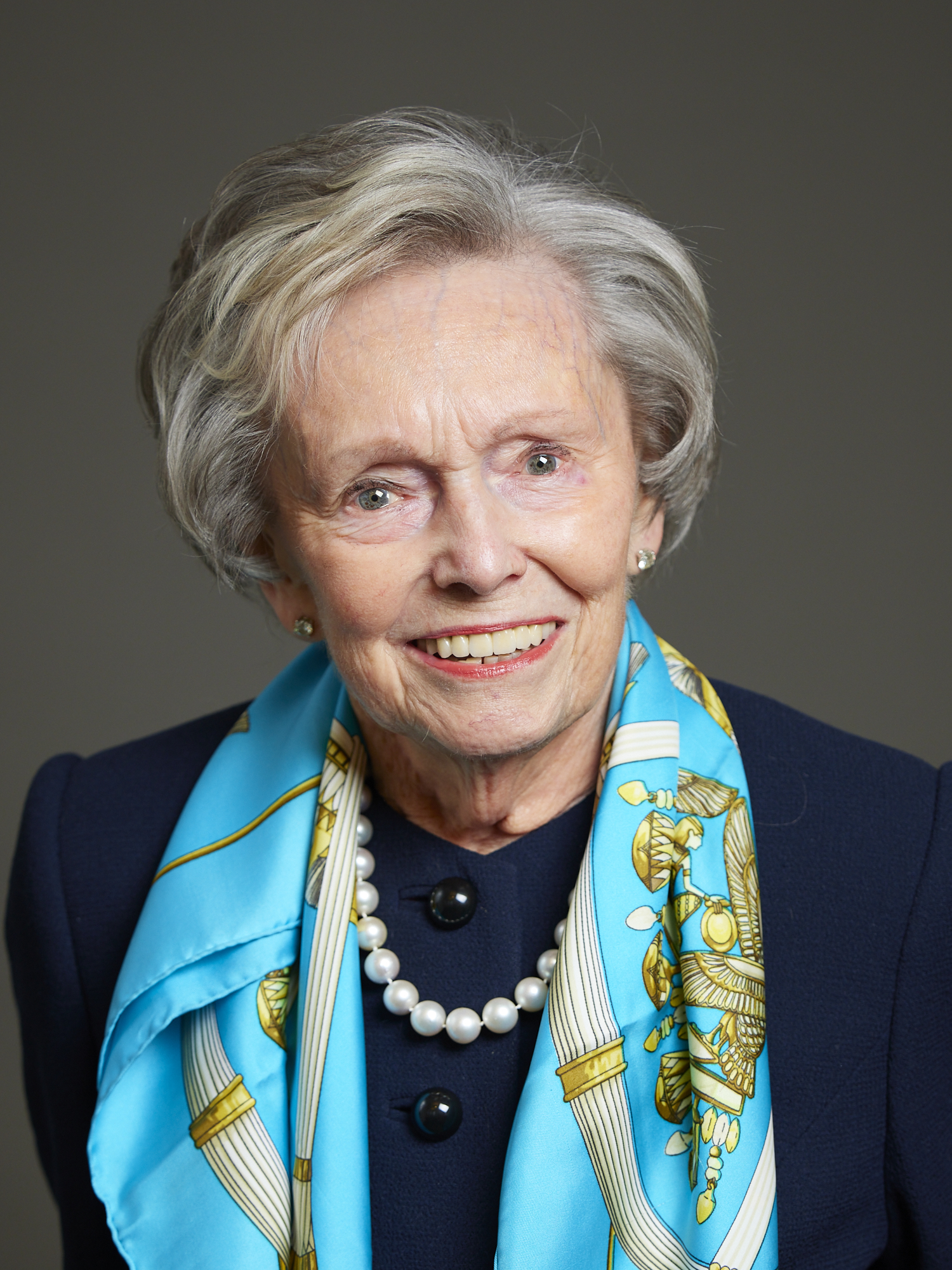
- Official portrait, 2023

Member of the House of Lords
- Lord Temporal
- Life peerage 14 February 1991

Personal details
- Born: Joan Anna Dalziel Owen; 3 May 1930 (age 96)
- Party: Conservative
- Spouse: Henry Lawrence Seccombe (m. 1950; died 2008)
- Children: 2

Joan Anna Dalziel Seccombe, Baroness Seccombe DBE (née Owen; born 3 May 1930) is a British Conservative Party politician.

The daughter of Robert John Owen and Olive Barlow, she married Henry Lawrence Seccombe, son of Herbert Stanley Seccombe, in 1950. The couple had two sons. Henry Lawrence Seccombe died on 29 June 2008. She was created a Dame Commander of the Order of the British Empire (DBE) in the 1984 Birthday Honours, and was created a life peer on 14 February 1991, taking the title Baroness Seccombe, of Kineton in the County of Warwickshire.

From 1997 to 2001, she was Opposition Whip and formerly the Opposition Spokesperson for Constitutional and Legal Affairs/Justice.

== Arms ==
Coat of arms of Joan Seccombe, Baroness Seccombe
Adopted 2008 Escutcheon Per pale Gules and Vert, a Chevron Ermine, between three Bugle Horns Argent, stringed Or, on a Chief per pale Vert and Gules, three Roses Argent, barbed Or, on each another Rose Gules, barbed and seeded proper. Supporters Dexter: a Dragon Gules, armed and langued Vert, dimidiating a Lion Vert, armed Gules, gorged with a Collar attached thereto a Chain reflexed over the back Or. Sinister: a Dragon Vert, armed and langued Gules, dimidiating a Lion Gules, armed Vert, gorged with a Collar attached thereto a Chain reflexed over the back Or. Motto PERSEVERANTIA (Perseverance)
