= James Gordon, Baron Gordon of Strathblane =

Scottish businessman (1936–2020)

The Right Honourable The Lord Gordon of Strathblane CBE
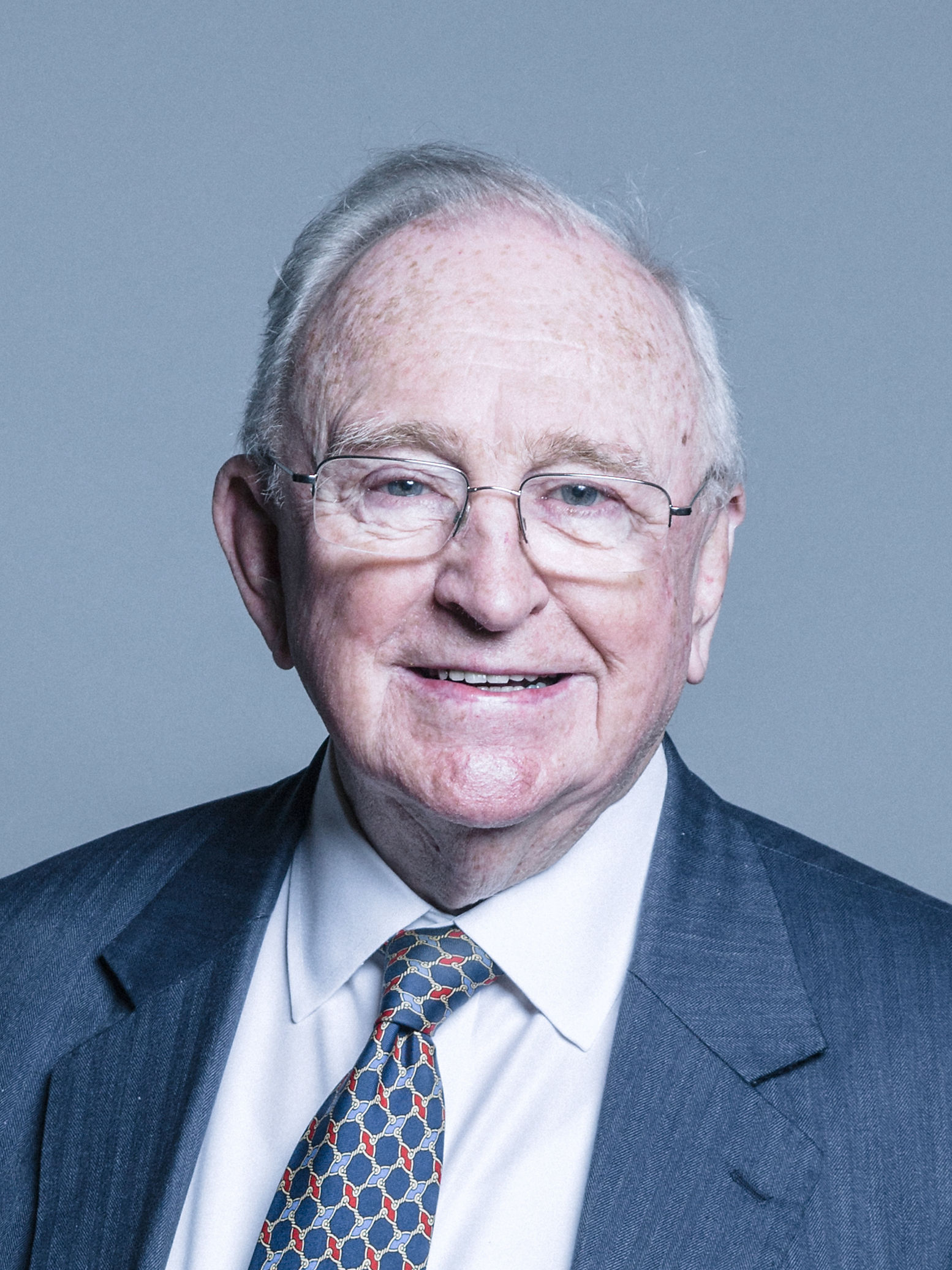
- Official portrait, 2018
- Born: James Stuart Gordon; 17 May 1936
- Died: 31 March 2020 (aged 83); Glasgow, Scotland
- Education: St Aloysius' College, Glasgow; University of Glasgow (MA)
- Occupations: Businessman; parliamentarian
- Political party: Labour
- Spouse: Margaret Anne Stevenson (m. 1971)
- Children: 3

Member of the House of Lords
- Lord Temporal
- Life peerage 4 October 1997 – 31 March 2020

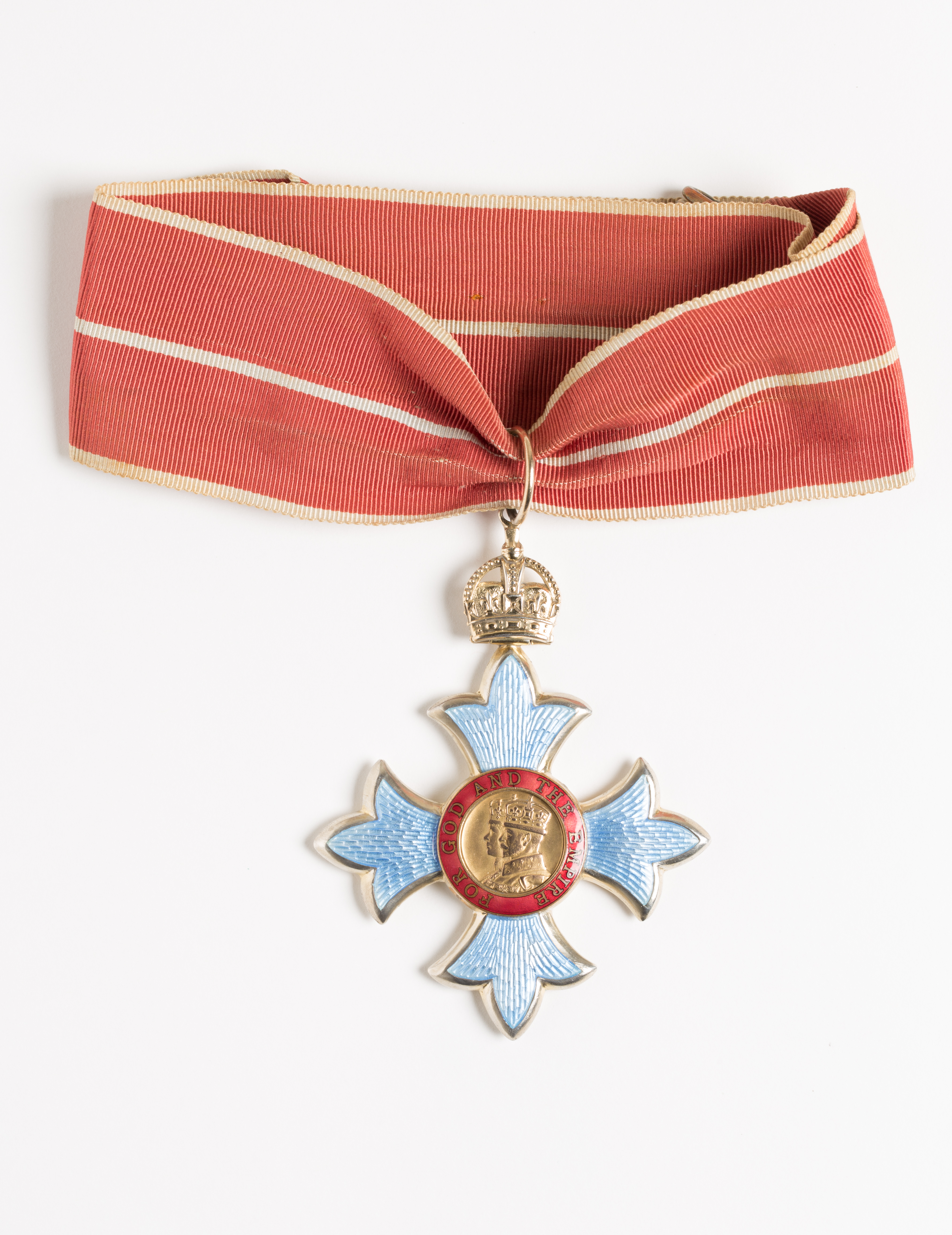
CBE insignia

James Stuart "Jimmy" Gordon, Baron Gordon of Strathblane, CBE (17 May 1936 – 31 March 2020) was a Scottish business executive and member of the House of Lords.

== Early life ==
A kinsman of the Marquess of Huntly, he was the son of James Gordon and Elsie née Riach.

Gordon was educated at the St Aloysius' College, Glasgow and the University of Glasgow, where he graduated as a Master of Arts in Classics in 1958.

== Business career ==
Gordon worked as a political editor for STV between 1965 and 1973, and as managing director of Radio Clyde between 1973 and 1996.

For Scottish Radio Holdings, Gordon was the Chief Executive from 1991 to 1996 and Chairman from 1996 to 2005; he was also Vice-Chairman of Melody Radio from 1991 to 1997, a director of Clydeport Holdings from 1992 to 1998 and Chairman of the Scottish Tourist Board from 1998 to 2001. From 1990, Gordon was a member of the Scottish Advisory Board of BP, and since 1996 a director of Johnston Press as well as Chairman of Active Capital Trust. He also served as Chairman of Radio Audience Research (RAJAR) from 2003.

Gordon was a member of the Scottish Development Agency between 1981 and 1990 and Chairman of the Scottish Exhibition and Conference Centre between 1983 and 1989. He was a member of the court of the University of Glasgow from 1984 to 1997 and of the Committee of Enquiry into Teachers' Pay and Conditions in 1986. Lord Gordon joined the Scottish Tourist Board in 1997, serving as its Chairman between 1998 and 2001. From 1997 to 1998, Gordon was also Chairman of the Advisory Group on Listed Events, and from 1998 to 1999, a member of the Independent Review Panel on Funding of BBC and then from 1998 to 2001 board member of the British Tourist Authority.

== Political career ==
At the 1964 general election Gordon contested East Renfrewshire for Labour. Gordon was further a Trustee of the National Galleries of Scotland between 1998 and 2001 and a Trustee of the John Smith Memorial Trust from 1995. From 1995 to 1997 he was Chairman of the Glasgow Common Purpose organization.

Appointed CBE in HM 1984 Birthday Honours, Gordon later received a Sony Award for his outstanding services to radio. On 4 October 1997, he was created a Life Peer taking the title Baron Gordon of Strathblane, of Deil's Craig in Stirlingshire. Elected a Fellow of the Radio Academy in 1994, Lord Gordon then received the Lord Provost's Award for Public Service as well as honorary degrees as Doctor of Letters (Hon DLitt) from the Glasgow Caledonian University, and Doctor of the University (DUniv) from the University of Glasgow in 1998.

== Personal life ==
Gordon married Margaret Anne Stevenson in 1971, by whom he had a daughter and two sons.

Gordon died on 31 March 2020 at Glasgow Royal Infirmary after contracting COVID-19. In a tribute, the Radio Academy of Scotland called him the 'Father of Scottish radio.'

== See also ==
- House of Lords
- Burke's Peerage & Baronetage

== Sources ==
- "DodOnline". Archived from the original on 5 April 2007.
