= Michael Tims =

Sir Michael David Tims, KCVO (born 1931) is a retired British courtier. He served as Serjeant-at-Arms to the Queen from 1987 to 1992. After completing National Service, Tims joined the Royal Household in 1953 as Deputy Comptroller of Supply. Between 1968 and 1992, he served as Assistant to the Master of the Household. He was appointed a Member (Fifth Class) of the Royal Victorian Order in the 1963 New Year Honours, and promoted to Member (Fourth Class) in the 1974 New Year Honours, then Commander in the 1984 Birthday Honours, and finally, in December 1992, to Knight Commander. He was also made a Freeman of the City of London in 1986.
