= Italian International Bank =

Italian International Bank was a consortium bank formed in London by four Italian banks in about 1972. The first chief executive was the former journalist Russell Taylor and the chairman was Rupert Raw. The bank later got into trouble, forcing Taylor's resignation. The bank subsequently became wholly owned by Banca Monte dei Paschi di Siena.
