= Russell Taylor (journalist) =

British journalist

Russell Taylor was a British journalist who was City editor of The Observer. He later worked for merchant bank Hambros, and in 1972 became chief executive of Italian International Bank. He was educated at Radley College.

== Selected publications ==
- Going for broke. Simon & Schuster, 1993. ISBN 978-0671711283
