= Hilton Clarke (banker) =

British banker

- Born: Hilton Swift Clarke; 1 April 1909
- Died: December 1995 (aged 86)
- Occupation: banker

Hilton Swift Clarke CBE (1 April 1909 – December 1995) was a British banker who served as Principal of the Discount Office of the Bank of England from 1953 to 1967. The Daily Telegraph described him as a "master of the calculated indiscretion... Tall, dapper, and resplendent in his silk hat, he controlled the discount market with the force of his presence".

== Early life ==
Clarke was the son of a timber salesman and educated at Highgate School. He joined the Bank of England shortly after his 18th birthday, where his elder brother was already employed as a clerk.

== Career ==
In 1938, Clarke joined the private office of the Governor of the Bank of England, Montagu Norman.

At the outbreak of the Second World War, Clarke helped establish the Bank of England's Exchange Control System and persuaded foreign exchange dealers in the City of London to join the new system. In 1942, Clarke was appointed Assistant Principal of the Dealing & Accounts Office of the Bank of England, became deputy principal of the Bank's Discount Office, and succeeded as Principal in 1953. The Discount Office of the Bank of England was in daily contact with the money markets and was where the discount houses of the City discounted or borrowed bills. The Principal of the Discount Office was often referred to as the 'Governor's eyes and ears in the city, as he was responsible for monitoring the activities of financial institutions. Clarke was Principal during the arrival of foreign banks, attracted by the development of European currency markets. When a journalist suggested to Clarke that dollar ($) bills of exchange would soon be traded in the city, Clarke rebuked him by responding "Young man, I'll trouble you to remember that this institution has a branded product of its own".

Reflecting on his work, Clarke remarked "I always reckoned you were idling if you were sitting at your desk in the Bank. I loved putting on my top hat...dropping in on the banks, and having a chat".

== Later years ==
After his retirement from the Bank of England, Clarke served as chairman of the merchant bankers Charterhouse Japhet and Atlantic International Bank and of the money brokers Astley & Pearce. Clarke also served as a director of the United Dominions Trust and the Malaysian plantation company Guthrie. Clarke was also a member of the London board of the Bank of Scotland.

In 1984, Clarke was appointed a Commander of the Order of the British Empire (CBE). He was married twice: first to his first wife, Sybil Slater, from 1934 until her death in 1975, with whom he had a son, and to Ann Marchant in 1984.

== See also ==
- Jim Keogh
