= Tom Oppé =

English paediatrician

Thomas Ernest Oppé CBE (7 February 1925 – 25 June 2007) was an English paediatrician and a professor of paediatrics at St Mary's Hospital, London. He is regarded as a pioneer in children's health services and infant nutrition.

== Early life ==
Oppé was born in 1925 in Hampstead to Ernest Frederick, a banker, and Ethel Nellie (née Rackstraw). His paternal uncle was the historian and art collector Paul Oppé. Tom Oppé attended University College School, and went into banking at the age of 15. He left after six months, deciding that he would prefer to study medicine, and began his pre-clinical training at Guy's Hospital in 1942. He was evacuated to Tunbridge Wells for much of the Second World War, and graduated with honours in 1947. He completed his national service as a surgeon lieutenant with the Royal Navy Medical Service, working mostly on board the aircraft carrier HMS Implacable.

== Career ==
Oppé had decided to pursue paediatrics as a medical student. He completed a year as house physician at Guy's Hospital, although this was interrupted when he was hospitalised for nine months with tuberculosis. He then moved to Great Ormond Street Children's Hospital for two years and travelled to Harvard University for a research fellowship. After two years at St Mary's Hospital as a paediatric registrar, in 1955 he was appointed a consultant paediatrician in Bristol. In Bristol he worked alongside the neonatology pioneer Beryl Corner, who would continue to influence him after he left Bristol. In 1960 he returned to St Mary's in London, where he would spend the rest of his career and was appointed a professor of paediatrics in 1969.

Oppé had vast research interests, and the topics of his published articles included premature infants, hypoglycaemia in infants, infant respiratory distress syndrome, the treatment of rhesus disease, and vitamin D deficiency. His most cited work was on the nutrition of babies; he chaired a Department of Health and Social Security working party which produced a report in 1974 recommending that infants be breastfed for the first 4–6 months of life, which came at a time when most British babies were being fed with infant formulas based on cow's milk. He had a special interest in Williams syndrome after working with a Navy colleague whose child had the genetic condition.

Oppé was an adviser to the government on many aspects of child health and nutrition, and was a key member of the committee that published the 1976 report "Fit for the Future", which outlined a plan for the provision of child health services. He was made a CBE in 1984 for his services to paediatrics.

== Personal life ==
Oppé met his wife Margaret while he was working at Guy's Hospital, where she was a nurse. Together they had four children and fostered a daughter. He retired in 1990 and died on 25 June 2007, in Kingston upon Thames.
