= Derek Barber, Baron Barber of Tewkesbury =

The Right Honourable The Lord Barber of Tewkesbury
- The Lord Barber of Tewkesbury

Member of the House of Lords
- Lord Temporal
- Life peerage 12 August 1992 – 25 March 2016

Personal details
- Born: 17 June 1918
- Died: 21 November 2017 (aged 99)
- Party: Crossbencher
- Education: Royal Agricultural College

Derek Coates Barber, Baron Barber of Tewkesbury (17 June 1918 – 21 November 2017) was a British member of the House of Lords. He also served as a senior civil servant and agricultural expert.

Barber was educated at the Royal Agricultural College and served in the Second World War. He worked as a farmer in Gloucestershire before serving in various posts at the Ministry of Agriculture, Fisheries and Food 1946–72. Since then he took various advisory roles on countryside and agricultural matters, including to the government and BBC.

He served as Chairman and later President of the Royal Society for the Protection of Birds; President of the Gloucestershire Naturalists' Society; President of the Royal Agricultural Society of England; President of the British Pig Association; and a Vice-President of the Nature in Art Trust. Barber was knighted in the 1984 Birthday Honours and was created a life peer as Baron Barber of Tewkesbury, of Gotherington in the County of Gloucestershire, on 12 August 1992. He was chairman of the Countryside Commission from 1981 to 1991.

He was a crossbench member of the House of Lords until his retirement on 25 March 2016.

He died, aged 99, on 21 November 2017.
