= Jen Chaiken =

American film producer

- Born: United States
- Education: Yale University
- Occupation: Film producer
- Years active: 1990s–present
- Notable work: My Flesh and Blood, Afternoon Delight, Inequality for All
- Spouse: Sam Hamilton (m. 2002)
- Awards: Emmy Award for Best Documentary

Jen Chaiken is an American indie film producer. Chaiken won an Emmy award for Best Documentary for the film My Flesh and Blood.

== Early life ==
Chaiken grew up in San Leandro and Lafayette. She is a graduate of Yale University, and lived in NYC before returning to San Francisco in 1997. Chaiken's intro to the film business began as an apprenticeship in New York after she finished college. She is a partner in the California-based 72 Productions. Chaiken is gay and married to Sam Hamilton, whom she married in 2002.

== Career ==
Chaiken was a producer for the dramedy Afternoon Delight and the feature documentary Inequality for All with Robert Reich, both of which premiered in competition at the Sundance Film Festival in 2013. Afternoon Delight won the US Drama Directing Award and Inequality for All received a Special Jury Award for Achievement in Filmmaking. Along with her producing partner Sebastian Dungan, Chaiken was selected for Variety's prestigious 10 Producers to Watch 2012 list.

For her work on My Flesh and Blood, Chaiken won an Emmy Award for Best Documentary following the film's Sundance wins for both the Audience and Best Director and the Audience Award and Critics Prize at the Amsterdam International Documentary Film Festival (IDFA). My Flesh and Blood was also short-listed for Academy Award consideration after its theatrical release by Strand Releasing and later broadcast as an HBO special.

Other credits for Chaiken include Tom Bezucha's first feature, Big Eden, winner of over 15 Audience Awards; the documentary feature Naked States, an HBO premiere; the HBO documentary short Positively Naked, short-listed for Academy consideration; Restaurant, starring Adrien Brody, I Love You, Don't Touch Me!, a Sundance premiere distributed by MGM; and the documentary feature Family Name, winner of the Freedom of Expression Award at Sundance and nominated for an Emmy after its broadcast on PBS.
