= Svetlana Cvetko =

American film director

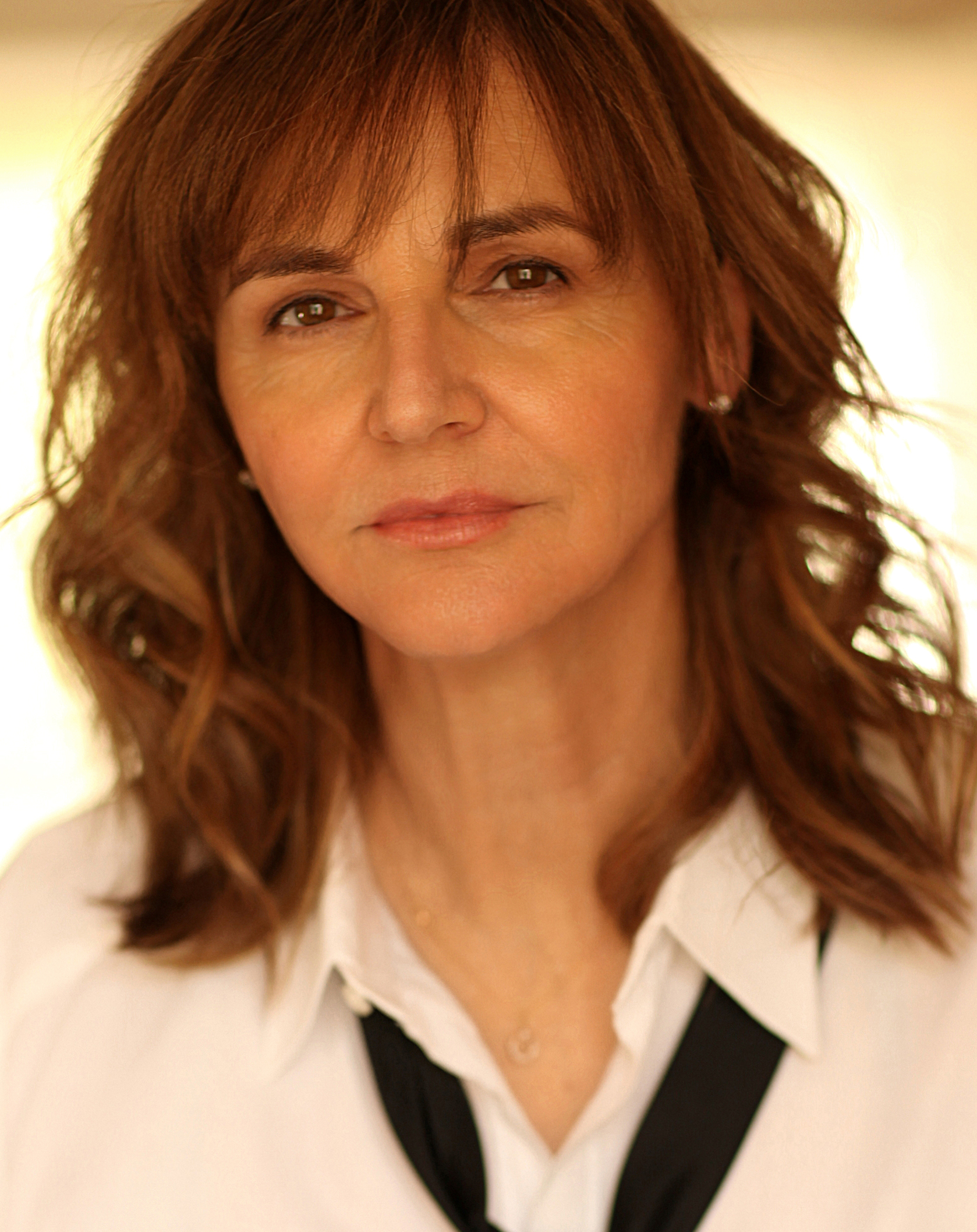
Svetlana Cvetko, 2020

Svetlana Cvetko is an American cinematographer and film director. She is most notable for being the cinematographer of several critically acclaimed documentaries including: Oscar winning Inside Job (2010), Oscar nominated Facing Fear (2010), and Sundance US Documentary Special Jury Prize-winning Inequality For All (2013). In addition, she was the first cinematographer on films such as Oscar winning OJ: Made In America and Sundance documentary Miss Representation.

Cvetko was invited to join the Academy of Motion Picture Arts and Sciences in 2019 because of her contribution to feature motion pictures and distinguishing herself as an artist in the film industry. She is a member of the Cinematographers Branch and on its executive committee.

== Background and education ==
Cvetko came to the United States as an expatriate of the former Yugoslavia in the late 1980s to pursue a career in filmmaking. Originally a still photographer, Cvetko was inspired by the work of Agnès Godard to become an established female cinematographer. She moved to the San Francisco Bay Area. While attending classes at the University of California, Berkeley extension program, Cvetko met film professor Larry Clark. Clark became Cvetko's mentor and gave her access to her first production set.

== Career ==
Cvetko began her career with No War, a documentary film about the conflict in Bosnia. Directed and shot by Cvetko, No War was shown in over 15 festivals around the world and won the Grand Prix du Public in Films de Femmes in 2001.

Cvetko was also the cinematographer of Miss Representation, directed by Jennifer Siebel Newsom and premiering at the 2011 Sundance Film Festival in the documentary competition, and the Sundance 2013 Special Jury Prize winner Inequality For All. She was the cinematographer for Inside Job, directed by Charles Ferguson. Premiering at Cannes Film Festival in 2010, Inside Job won the Academy Award for Best Documentary Feature. She shot the 2014 documentary Red Army, which premiered at the 2014 Cannes Film Festival and was screened at the Toronto International Film Festival. She also shot the narrative films (Untitled) and The Architect directed by Jonathan Parker and On a Tuesday directed by David Scott Smith.

She shot On a Tuesday on Kodak 35 mm film in the Super 35 format. Cvetko and director David Scott Smith created a panoramic, widescreen 3.18:1 aspect ratio to shoot in the San Francisco City Hall. Discovered by accident while scouting locations there, Cvetko said: "It was breathtaking. The space was just asking to be seen that way".

In 2016, Cvetko directed a short Yours Sincerely, Lois Weber, about the trailblazing silent-film director, starring Eilizabeth Banks, who is also the film's executive producer. (Variety)

Cvetko directed her first feature-length film, award-winning Show Me What You Got. A story of three people in their twenties who form a ménage à trois and struggle to prove themselves worthy to their families and the world. The film was awarded the Grand Jury Prize at Taormina Film Festival, which Oliver Stone handed to Cvetko and team at the world premiere.

=== Critical recognition ===
Cvetko's cinematography has been praised. The New York Times called her work "clean wide-screen cinematography [that] provides an aesthetic polish", and Pete Hammond of Deadline Hollywood called her cinematography "perfect".

"In director-cinematographer Svetlana Cvetko’s ambitious indie drama “Show Me What You Got,” three soulful twentysomethings bare their hearts and bodies to one another in sleek, polyamorous European-flavored style". (Los Angeles Times)

"With her stylish, dynamic and affecting feature Show Me What You Got, the co-writer/director/DOP captures the malaise of today’s generation through a classic cinema lens; even Phillip Noyce thought it was dynamite". (Film Ink)

“Show Me What You Got is an homage to films such as Jules and Jim (and Willie and Phil, that film's loose reimagining). Cvetko shoots this gorgeous film — and the gorgeous actors — in arty black and white as the characters grapple with sex and love, as well as family and loss. (Gay City News)

"Two become three when the pair meet Christine (Cristina Rambaldi), an artist grieving her grandfather, at the coffee shop where she works. The three eventually fall in love, and Svetlana Cvetko, the director and cinematographer, renders their courtship beautifully". (New York Times)

"We want to catch talent early [Svetlana], and I feel like this is the best chance to build a relationship with a soon to be great filmmaker. The projects we do are low to micro-budget, and that daredevil aspect of filmmaking I absolutely love. So to answer your question it’s because it’s fun to make films with great people". Nikolay Sarkisov (Variety)

"Show Me What You Got is an elegant black-and-white art-house film by cinematographer and director Svetlana Cvetko. (ABS-CBN News)

== Selected filmography ==
Director

- No War (2000)
- She Kept Silent (2004)
- Daily Specials (2006)
- Public Ceremony (2016)
- Yours Sincerely, Lois Weber (2017)
- Deadly Switch (2019)
- Dear Catherine (2019)
- Show Me What You Got (2021)

Cinematography

- Birju (2002)
- Raw (2005)
- Daily Specials (2006)
- Last Flight Home (2007)
- The Book (2007)
- On a Tuesday (2007)
- How to Be Popular (2007)
- Unflinching Triumph: The Philip Rockhammer Story (2007)
- (Untitled) (2009)
- Inside Job (2010) Oscar Winning
- Miss Representation (2011)
- Inequality for All (2013)
- Facing Fear (2013) Academy Award Nominated
- Red Army (2014)
- She's Beautiful When She's Angry (2014)
- Brand: A Second Coming (2015)
- Daddy (2015)
- Tig (2015)
- The Architect (2016)
- O.J.: Made in America (2016) Academy Award Winning
- Enlighten Us (2016)
- Silicon Cowboys (2016)
- Ahead of the Curve (2020)
- Stuntwomen: The Untold Hollywood Story (2020)
- Undiscovered: The Lost Lincoln (2020)
- Sundays (2020)
- Strip Down, Rise Up (2021)
- Julia (2021)
- Show Me What You Got (2021)

== Awards and nominations ==
- No War - Winner Grand Prix du Public in Films de Femmes (2001)
- Yours Sincerely, Lois Weber - Winner of Best Documentary Short Film at American Short Film Awards (2017)
- Show Me What You Got - Winner of Grand Jury Prize 'Best Film' at Taormina Film Festival (2019)
- Show Me What You Got - Winner of Best International Film at Terra Di Siena (2019)
- Show Me What You Got - Winner of Audience Award Best of Fest at High Falls Women's Film Festival (2019)
- Show Me What You Got - Winner of Best Cinematography at High Falls Women's Film Festival (2019)
- Show Me What You Got - Nominated for Best Emerging Director at St. Louis International Film Festival (2019)
- Show Me What You Got - Winner of Best Cinematography at Santa Fe Film Festival (2020)
- Show Me What You Got - Winner of Best of the Fest Grand Jury Prize at San Antonio Film Festival (2020)
- Show Me What You Got - Nominated for Best Narrative Film at Loudoun Arts Film Festival (2020)
- Show Me What You Got - Winner of Best Supporting Actress at Loudoun Arts Film Festival (2020)
- Show Me What You Got - Winner of Best Cinematography at Loudoun Arts Film Festival (2020)
