= Inequality for All =

- Theatrical release poster
- Directed by: Jacob Kornbluth
- Produced by: Jen Chaiken; Sebastian Dungan
- Narrated by: Robert Reich
- Cinematography: Svetlana Cvetko; Dan Krauss
- Edited by: Kim Roberts; Miranda Yousef
- Music by: Marco D'Ambrosio
- Production company: 72 Productions
- Distributed by: Radius-TWC
- Release dates: January 19, 2013 (Sundance); September 27, 2013 (United States)
- Running time: 89 minutes
- Country: United States
- Language: English
- Box office: $1.2 million

Inequality for All is a 2013 documentary film directed by Jacob Kornbluth and narrated by American economist, author and professor Robert Reich. Based on Reich's 2010 book Aftershock: The Next Economy and America's Future, the film examines widening income inequality in the United States. Reich publicly argued about the issue for decades, and producing a film of his viewpoints was a "final frontier" for him. In addition to being a social issue documentary, Inequality for All is also partially a biopic regarding Reich's early life and his time as Secretary of Labor under Bill Clinton's presidency. Warren Buffett and Nick Hanauer, two entrepreneurs and investors in the top 1%, are interviewed in the film, supporting Reich's belief in an economy that benefits all citizens, including those of the middle and lower classes.

As shown via a series of suspension bridge graphs, the income gap between middle-to-low-class Americans and the top 1% in the United States was at the same extreme highs in 1928 and 2007, two years that preceded economic crashes. Reich argues that inequality in capitalism is a necessary incentive for citizens to work harder, but at a low-enough level to where democracy is protected and is in a virtuous cycle; with high-enough wages and taxes, there will be more investments in government programs, a more college-educated population, and consumer spending creating more jobs. The United States economy was in this cycle in the 1940s and 1970s, but that changed starting in the late 1970s as a result of union-busting, tax cuts, deregulation, job outsourcing, and other changes in the system meant to increase Wall Street's profits; this resulted in a decline of average worker pay and an increased amount of average income for top-earners from 1978 to 2010.

Inequality for All premiered at the 2013 Sundance Film Festival in the Documentary Competition section that had several other political films in its line-up, including another film about income inequality. It won the festival's U.S. Documentary Special Jury Award for Achievement in Filmmaking and was bought by RADiUS-TWC five days after its January 19 premiere. After months of running at several other festivals, the film was released to United States theaters by RADiUS on September 27, 2013 and grossed more than $1 million in just over a month, which was rare for an issue documentary. It received very high opinions from professional critics, who praised its easy-to-understand demonstration of a complicated topic and likeable narrator; however, it also garnered criticism for what libertarian and right-leaning sources and publications deemed to be narrow-minded, unoriginal viewpoints and lack of credible opposing arguments.

== Content ==
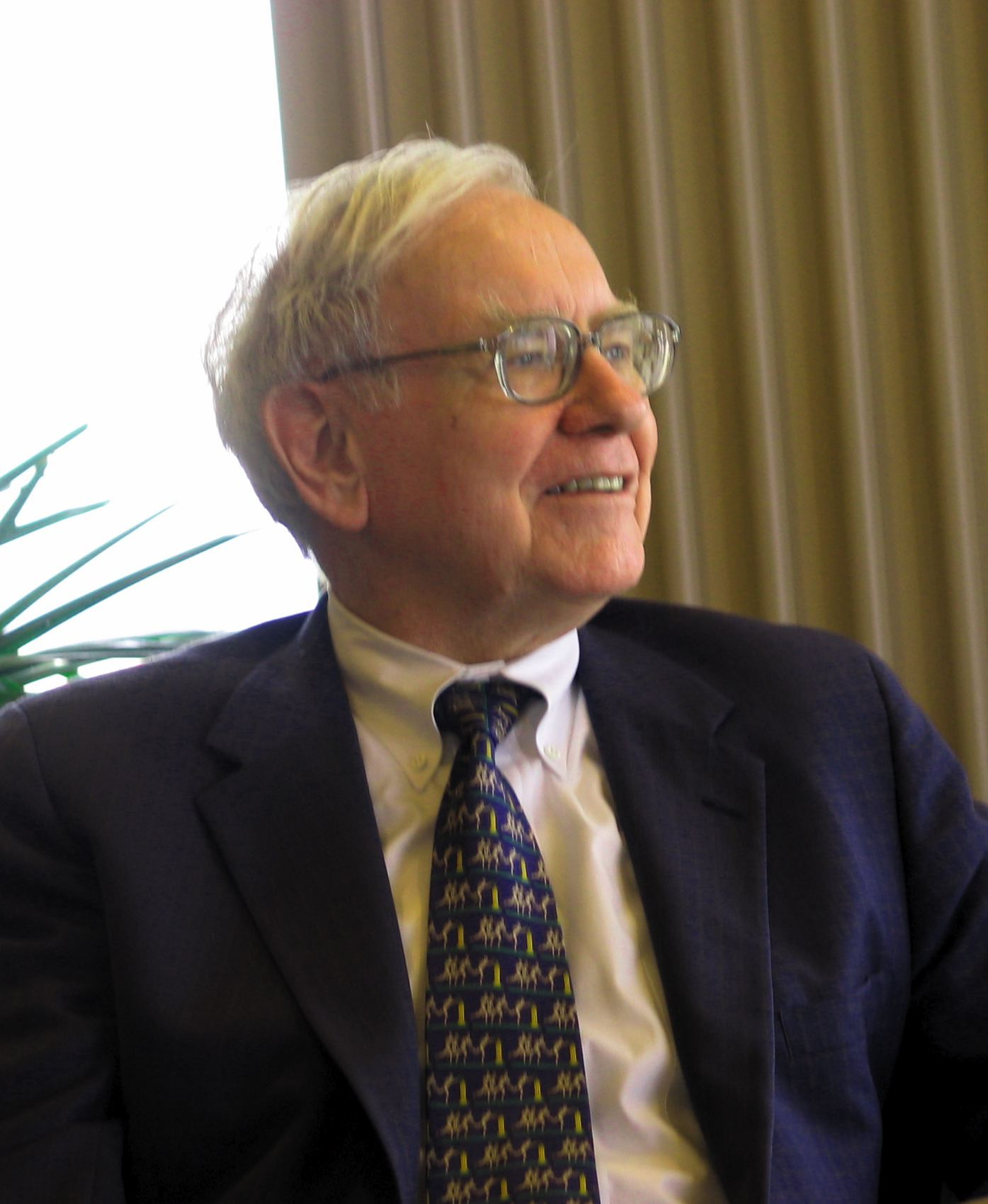
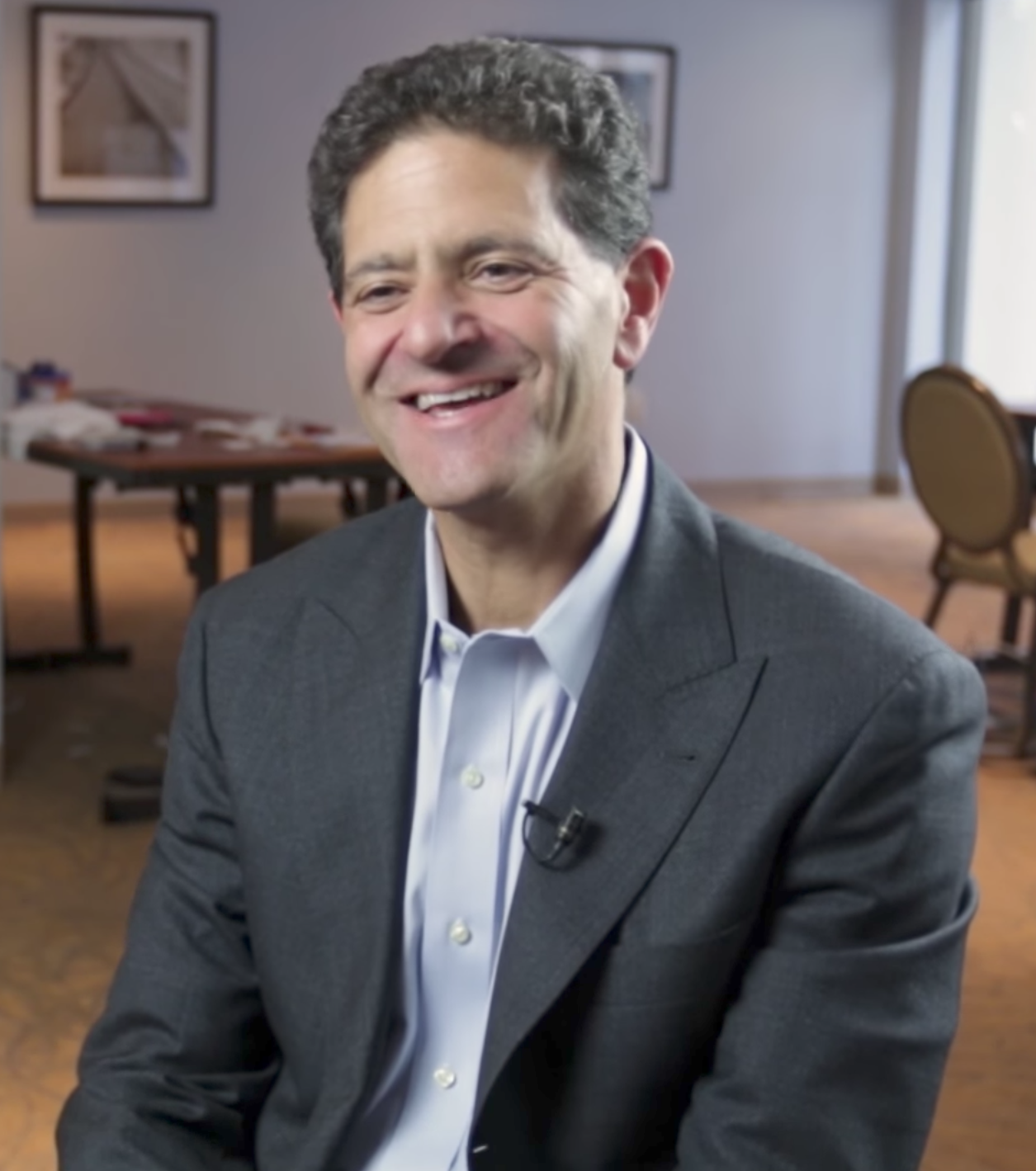
Two entrepreneurs, Warren Buffett (left) and Nick Hanauer (right) were interviewed in the film and they admitted for higher taxes and a system benefiting the middle class.

Robert Reich, author, professor at the University of California, Berkeley, official in three administrations, including United States Secretary of Labor under Bill Clinton, narrates Inequality for All. Reich is a thinker on the topic of inequality, having spoken on the subject for nearly three decades. In a similar fashion to An Inconvenient Truth (2006), the film is organized around a narrative framework of his "Wealth and Poverty" classes taught at Berkeley, with interviews of average Americans in the middle class barely getting by.

Two families are interviewed. One of them is Erika and Robert Vaclav, who raise two daughters on a single source of income of Erika working as a Costco clerk for $21.50 an hour; the couple are forced to live with other relatives after Robert was laid off as a Circuit City manager, and only have a $25 checking account. The other family interviewed is a Republican Mormon family that became pro-union after being laid off from a Calpine geothermal plant.

Inequality for All is also a biopic of Reich's life. As a child, he was made fun of for being short as a result of Fairbanks disease, and was protected by racial civil rights advocate Michael Schwerner from those who intimidated Reich. According to himself, the killing of Schwerner by the Ku Klux Klan, as well as Reich learning about Martin Luther King Jr. and Robert F. Kennedy, inspired him to do what he could to change society for the better. Reich also discusses his time as Secretary of Labor, where he states regrets not doing enough to help fix the economic problems caused by previous administrations.

A series of suspension bridge graphs show similarities between the economies of 1928 and 2007, two years that preceded economic crashes. The economy boomed after World War II in a period of 1947 to 1977 Reich names "The Great Prosperity," when inequality was declining. Then came president Ronald Reagan's union-busting efforts and cutting of taxes on the rich in the late 1970s and 1980s; this, along with globalization, technology, job outsourcing, and Wall Street's desire to have their profits as high as possible resulted in stagnant wages, stilted college attendance rate, and the ruining of manufacturing jobs that made the middle class. In combatting this, the middle and working class took on several techniques that eventually became useless, such as working multiple jobs and longer hours, using houses as banks, and women entering the workforce. An average male worker's annual pay went from $48,302 in 1978 to $33,751 in 2010, while the average pay of someone in the top one-percent grew at a higher rate, from $393,682 to $1.1 million. As of 2013, the 400 richest Americans own more wealth than the bottom 150 million combined; and 42% of Americans born into poverty aren't out of it, compared to 30% of poor British citizens and 25% of the poor living in Denmark.

Although not holding liable the problem on one partisan label (Republican or Democrat), Reich's stance is left-leaning where the only right-wing arguments presented are clips of The Daily Show mocking conservative politicians and Bill O'Reilly labeling him a "communist." Reich contests the existence of a true, ruleless "free market". He challenges the ideology in which those at the top are job-creators, given that 70% of the American economy is fueled by consumer spending. The richest Americans don't use most of their money to invest in the production of goods, services, and jobs, but rather in speculation. According to Reich, the economy works best when it's in a virtuous cycle, where there is more spending, taxes, government investments, college-educated citizens, and workers as a result of higher wages; the economy is currently the opposite of that, in a vicious cycle. Venture capitalist millionaire Nick Hanauer is interviewed in the film and supports this claim: "a person like me doesn’t buy 1,000 pillows. Even the richest person sleeps with only one or two. The most pro-business thing you can do is to help middle-class people thrive." Reich also interviews Warren Buffett, where he wishes he would be taxed at a higher income tax.

While Reich argues that inequality in capitalism is necessary for incentivizing people to work, he warns that too much inequality will cause a undemocratic system; this theme is presented in a conversation with Alan Simpson, where he suggests there will be a "government on the auction block" if inequality gets worse. As Reich concludes Inequality for All under footage of Occupy Wall Street and Tea Party protests, "A lot of people feel the game is stacked against them, and losers in rigged games get angry. We are losing equal opportunity in America, our moral foundation stone." The film's last lecture ends with advising his students to come up with solutions to the problem on their own before dancing off the stage to the working-class anthem "9 to 5" by Dolly Parton.

== Production ==
This whole area of widening inequality in income, wealth and opportunity is rapidly getting out of control. It’s very important that people understand it. And it’s too easy to caricature—by the right, as essentially a problem of poor people not taking responsibility, and by the left, as essentially a matter of greedy CEOs and Wall Streeters. Those caricatures are both wrong. It’s systemic; it has to do with how we’ve organized society.

— Robert Reich when interviewed by The Nation

Reich publicly speaking in 2011 about the economic issues facing the United States, many of which are also in Inequality for All

Jacob Kornbluth grew up poor and lived in various suburban and urban areas around citizens of all political leanings.

Reich and Kornbluth previously worked with each other on two-minute videos before Kornbluth pitched to Reich a film based on his book Aftershock (2010). During the Great Recession, Kornbluth noticed cynicism towards the political system from his peers, feeling as if they couldn't "participate" in the economy. With his only knowledge of the American economy from conflicting mainstream media news stories, Kornbluth found himself to be the right learner of ideas from an expert in economics like Reich. For Kornbluth, the similarities between the look of the suspension bridge and the graphs of concentrated wealth in 1928 and 2007 in the beginning of Aftershock was the "ah ha" moment that made him want to learn more about the topic. Reich initially didn't see a reason for producing the film about economic inequality, but after a decades-worth amount of previous failed attempts to get the problems about severe economic inequality in the public's mind, producing a film was a "sort of the last frontier for me."

Inequality for All was first announced in a Deadline article published on January 26, 2012, its premise summarized as a "film about former U.S. Labor Secretary Robert Reich's efforts to call national attention to the nation's gaping economic inequality"; director Kornbluth, cinematographer Svetlana Cvetko, editor Kim Roberts, producers Sebastian Dungan and Jen Chaiken, and production company 72 Productions were revealed to be working on the project. Dungan and Chaiken started producing another project, Afternoon Delight, in the middle of working on Inequality for All in order to diversify and increase their output for higher profits; this tightened work hours for both films as they planned to submit them to the same Sundance Film Festival event.

60-days-worth of original footage was shot on RED Epic, Sony F300, Canon C300 and Canon EOS 5DS cameras for Inequality for All. The amount of media compiled for the film (both original and archival) totaled 550 hours and more than ten terabytes. Although Inequality for All features several interpretations from Reich, Kornbluth developed the movie by learning about economics himself first and measuring his understandings against Reich's: "You’d see him boil it down and in a deep way thoughtfully put it together, and it raised my admiration for his argument." The most common disagreements between Kornbluth and Reich were the biographical aspects of the script; Kornbluth thought they would help the viewers emotionally connect with the material, while according to Reich they related too little to the main theme. To keep Inequality for All non-partisan, solutions to the problem were left out of the film for the viewers to go to its official website (inequalityforall.com), which featured tips on what to do.

== Release and promotion ==
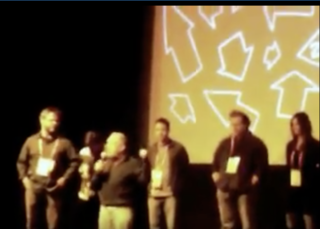
A Q&A at the 2013 Sundance Film Festival held after the Inequality for All and featuring Reich (center) and Kornbluth (left)

Inequality for All was one of 16 films in the Documentary Competition of the 2013 Sundance Film Festival, which was the most political line-up in the category's history; opponents included another film about income equality (99%: The Occupy Wall Street Collaborative Film), a movie regarding Citizens United v. FEC's impact on the American political system (Citizen Koch), a film about four doctors performing late pregnancy termination (After Tiller), and two productions on the war on terror (Dirty Wars and Manhunt: The Search for Bin Laden). It premiered at the festival in Park City, Utah's Prospector Square Park Theatre on January 19, 2013.

Inequality for All was later screened at the San Francisco International Film Festival on May 4, 2013, the LA Film Festival on June 23, 2013, the Traverse City Film Festival on August 2, 2013, Aspen Institute's Paepcke Auditorium on August 5, 2013, and the 2013 Deauville American Film Festival. Radius-TWC bought the distribution rights for $750,000 on January 23, 2013 with a plan for a theatrical release in summer 2013.

Around the time Inequality for All was released, Kornbluth ran a grass-roots promotion bringing labor unions, college students, and progressive organizations together to run screenings of the film and fight economic inequality. The film was also promoted with the "Save the Middle Class National Tour" that started on the 50th anniversary of the War on Poverty in 2014.

Upon the theatrical release, Reich discussed themes of Inequality for All via interviews on shows such as Marketplace, PBS NewsHour, CBS MoneyWatch, Democracy Now!, and Moyers & Company; and publications such as i am Rogue Collider, OpEdNews, AARP, Time, and The Nation. CNN also cited stats from the film in an October 2013 report about East Carroll Parish, Louisiana, which had the highest income inequality of all areas in the United States.

On October 3, 2013, during a federal government shutdown, Landmark Theatres and Radius-TWC offered free tickets to federal and military workers to see Inequality for All at 13 Landmark theaters across the United States.

After its U.S. run, Inequality for All was screened at Lipscomb University's Shamblin Theatre as part of the Nashville Film Festival and Nashville Public Television's HumanDocs Film Series on February 26, 2014. It was later screened at the 2015 Tromsø International Film Festival.

== Reception ==
=== Box office ===
Inequality for All opened on September 27, 2013 to 28 theaters in the United States, and grossed a total of $140,000, with a $5,000 per-theater average, in its first week; the presidents of Radius explained that while it was a risky move to have an issue documentary open in such a high amount of theaters due to the genre's usual commercial difficulty, it exceeded expectations due to strong reviews and a popular contemporary topic. Reaching the million-dollar mark in its fifth week, a rare feat for a documentary at the time; Inequality for All ended up being the tenth highest-grossing motion picture from the 2013 Sundance Festival with a domestic gross totaling around $1.2 million.

=== Critical response ===
According to the aggregate site Rotten Tomatoes, 90% of 62 professional reviews of Inequality for All were positive, and critics opined that "while it arrives in a glut of similarly themed documentaries, Inequality for All distinguishes itself with a compelling presentation of an important message, as well as much-needed splashes of wit." It also has an average rating of 68 out of 100 on Metacritic based on 24 critical reviews. Carole Cadwalladr of The Guardian labeled the film "a really astonishingly good movie that takes some big economic ideas and how these relate to the quality of everyday life as lived by most ordinary people." Reviews labeled it essential viewing, "the Indianapolis 500 of wealth analyses," and "intelligent, persuasive and accessible, a gentle but urgent clarion call to action." Journalist Gregg Kilday and awards analyst Scott Feinberg considered Inequality for All a contender for the Academy Award for Best Documentary Feature; Feinberg specifically ranked it the 12th mostly-likely film of 151 long-listed documentaries to make it to the award's 15-movie shortlist for its An Inconvenient Truth-esque format, simple explanation of a complicated and serious subject, and for being the highest-grossing social issue documentary since Waiting for "Superman" (2010). It ended up not making the shortlist, however.

Inequality for All was heavily acclaimed for its easy-to-understand presentation of a complex topic, with critics recommending the film for economics beginners. Marc Mohan of The Oregonian opined, "He has the gift of explaining complex ideas simply without dumbing them down, and the ability to firmly argue his point without becoming angry, strident or didactic." Inequality for All's condensing of several topics into a 90-minute runtime was claimed successful by U.S. News & World Report journalist Danielle Kurtzleben, who summarized "the film manages to be exhaustive without being exhausting." However, it was considered "rushed" by The Washington Post. Critics reported being engaged with Reich's interpretations. The Arizona Republic attributed this to its stylistic decision, such as its use of humor, television clips, and "graphics that look like an iPhone ad." They also enjoyed Reich's narrative as a sound and uplifting take on an otherwise dour subject, avoiding the extremely negative tones that usually drove other documentaries of serious topics. The Los Angeles Times also highlighted the filmmaking craft, explaining that "Kornbluth, for his part, employs his skills as a dramatic feature director [...] to bring energy and vigor to the way this film is structured, making especially good use of lively animation and vivid charts."

Reich's presence was positively commented on, with The Christian Science Monitor stating that his comedic and upbeat demeanor "gives credence to the seriousness of his message. He’s all about fairness, and, in his demeanor, as well as in his presentation, he embodies that ideal." As Corey Hall of Metro Times stated, "It helps that Reich himself is such an irresistible ball of charisma, endlessly engaging, whether enchanting his econ students at UC Berkeley or doing a buddy cop parody with Conan O’Brien." "Reich is disarmingly likeable, with a penchant for self-deprecating jokes about being short [...] while burrowing into his subject with the rigour of a scholar," summarized Toronto Star critic Bruce DeMara. "He’s dynamic, obviously bright and it only feels a little over-the-top when his students give him a standing ovation at the end. [...] Reich is naturally funny [and] apparently genuinely likes to be among people." In the opinion of Slant Magazine writer Kalvin Henely, "Reich’s sleek presentation—his neat rhetoric and clean, simplified graphics that lucidly explain his ideas, along with a sense of humor about his diminutive height—makes him an effective, affable spokesman for the middle class." The San Francisco Chronicle explained Inequality for All benefitted the most from a genuine narrator at its center, avoiding "condescending intellectual" attitudes typical of similar films in its genre: "[the film] depicts a man trying to change the world for the better, not merely preserving his own opinions for the approval of history." IndieWire commended Reich's autobiographical moments for being "inspiring" and adding a "personally emotional" touch to a documentary about economics; while the Orange County Register called them "so refreshingly, unselfconsciously personal that Reich is able to make frank admissions without a hint of over-emphasis."

However, Inequality of All wasn't free of condemnation. Some critics disliked that its concepts were already common knowledge and in previous economy documentaries. The A.V. Club felt Reich's self-deprecating humor and narratives about his time in office were unnecessary tangents and "advertisement[s]" of Reich as an economic expert. Hall similarly dismissed the salesman essence of the film: "This is a curious case of liking the messenger, loving the message and yet still feeling as if you’re being too heavily sold, even if you want to by [sic] into the product." Kurtzleben also thought the middle-class family interviews, while necessary, caused pacing problems, as they were slower than segments showcasing statistics and historical points at a faster rate. A couple of fingers were also pointed at the segment discussing Reich's time as Secretary of Labor; RedEye reviewer Matt Pais found it a distraction from the main subject, while Andrew Barker of Variety noticed that he "doesn’t mention Clinton’s substantial role in furthering the financial deregulation trends that would come back to bite the world economy in the ass a decade later." Pais also noted other holes: "Nowhere do the filmmakers address how people have adapted. Have some opted not to have kids because they can't support families? How have some succeeded by skipping college and using their money in other ways?" A lack of a real solution to wide inequality was also not fondly received, although Simon Houpt was more sympathetic due to the United States' democracy being so "frozen."

=== Partisan reception ===
The rejection of credible opposing viewpoints garnered mixed responses. While Mohan approved the script's non-partisan nature in not blaming a specific side, Kurtzleben and Milwaukee Journal Sentinel's Duane Dudek suggested this didn't do much as Reich's arguments leaned liberal and would turn off conservative viewers and those who thought the economy's problems have nothing to do with inequality.

In fact, right-leaning sources panned Inequality for All. Pro-libertarian institution Liberty International and Senior Fellow of Adam Smith Institute Tim Worstall (a frequent critic of Reich) published articles debunking viewpoints in the film, and it was dismissed by the New York Post as a set of "misleading" statements. Greg Beato, in an article about the rise of crowdfunded political causes published on the libertarian magazine Reason, found it ironic that Inequality for All, a motion picture criticizing the decreased power and opportunity of the middle class, was funded with Kickstarter, one of many "radically democratic platforms of alternative finance" on the internet. The conservative Christian source MovieGuide threw many partisan labels at the film, calling it a "strong humanist worldview with very strong Romantic, politically correct propaganda that’s a Neo-Marxist, crypto communist, and socialist attack on American capitalism and a defense of the welfare state starring former Secretary of Labor Robert Reich, a radical leftist, and though Reich says he’s really pro-capitalist, all of his attacks and solutions seem the opposite."

The Daily Herald was more appreciative of only left-leaning viewpoints being portrayed: "A real journalistic approach to Reich's warnings of financial doom would destroy this doc's marketable good will -- and probably confuse viewers with too many voices." Pais, on the other hand, opined the film should've blamed more groups of people than just Reagan, and that Reich's inability of doing this showed he "really doesn’t pay much attention to the people at all." Barker, however, thought the film was fair to conservative viewpoints: "Reich engages the [Republican Mormon family] in debate with admirable civility and a lack of condescension, and the rest of the docu strives to follow suit (though fiscal conservatives will obviously disagree with many of the film’s arguments, it scarcely ever resorts to straw-man chicanery)." Film industry academic and journalist Scott Mendelson also disagreed that the film had a liberal stance, but suggested it still wouldn't have swayed most conservative minds due to being in a market favoring explicitly partisan products like 2016: Obama’s America (2012) and No End In Sight (2007): "[RADiUS-TWC] hope[s] that the film will attract outside attention from those who follow these issues and/or discuss documentaries of this nature, and that interest will leak out into the mainstream news cycle and perhaps change a few hearts and minds by default."

=== Accolades ===
List of accolades
Award	Category	Result	Ref.
Cinema Eye Honors	Outstanding Achievement in Graphic Design or Animation	Nominated	
Los Angeles Times year-end list	Best of 2013 (Betsy Sharkey)	9	
Houston Film Critics Society Awards	Best Documentary	Nominated	
Seattle International Film Festival Golden Space Needle Award	Best Documentary	Runner-up	
Seattle Weekly year-end list	Best Films of 2013	10	
Sundance Film Festival	U.S. Documentary Special Jury Award for Achievement in Filmmaking	Won	
Traverse City Film Festival Audience Award	Best Documentary Film	Won	
Zurich Film Festival Golden Eye	Best International Documentary Film	Nominated	

== See also ==
- "It's 2059, and the Rich Kids are Still Winning", a 2019 short story by Ted Chiang.
