= Sebastian Dungan =

American film producer (born 1972)

- Born: March 12, 1972 (age 54); Los Angeles, California, U.S.
- Education: Yale University
- Occupation: Film producer

Sebastian Alexis Dungan is an American film producer. He began his career at Paramount Pictures and the Warner Bros.-based Witt-Thomas Films. His producing credits include Transamerica and Afternoon Delight. He is a principal partner of the independent production company 72 Productions.

== Career ==
The son of American-born Andrew Dungan and French-born Sylvaine Dungan, Sebastian began his career as a child actor. He appeared opposite Martin Sheen, playing his French son in the 1983 film Man, Woman and Child. His performance earned him a nomination for a Young Artist Award. He later graduated from Yale University.

He went on to work at Paramount Pictures and the Warner Bros.-based Witt-Thomas Films, where he was involved in the development of projects including David O. Russell's Three Kings and Christopher Nolan's Insomnia.

Dungan produced Transamerica, which received two Academy Award nominations and won a Golden Globe, as well as awards for Best Female Lead and Best First Screenplay at the Independent Spirit Awards.

In 2012, he was named one of Variety's "10 Producers to Watch" alongside producing partner Jen Chaiken. The following year, he produced the Sundance award-winning films Afternoon Delight, the directorial debut of Joey Soloway, and the documentary Inequality for All with Robert Reich. The latter premiered in the U.S. Documentary Competition section at Sundance and received a U.S. Documentary Special Jury Award for Achievement in Filmmaking.

Dungan is a partner in 72 Productions, which has offices in San Francisco and Los Angeles.

== Filmography ==
=== As producer ===
Year	Title	Notes
2005	Transamerica	Producer
2013	Afternoon Delight	Producer
2013	Inequality for All	Producer; documentary
2021	Girl in the Basement	Executive producer; television film

=== As actor ===
Year	Title	Role	Notes
1983	Man, Woman and Child	Jean-Claude Guerin	Feature film debut
1983	Fantasy Island	Patrick	Episode: "What's the Matter with Kids?/Island of Horrors" (S6.E20)
1985	Better Off Dead...	Paperboy	Uncredited

== Awards ==
Year	Award	Category	Work	Result	Ref
1984	Young Artist Awards	Best Young Motion Picture Actor in a Feature Film	Man, Woman and Child	Nominated	
2005	Awards Circuit Community Awards	Best Motion Picture	Transamerica	Nominated	
2006	Independent Spirit Awards	Best First Feature	Transamerica	Nominated	
2021	Primetime Emmy Awards	Outstanding Television Movie	Robin Roberts Presents: Mahalia	Nominated	

== Personal life ==
Dungan is openly gay. He married attorney Sholem Lavi Soloway in 2009. The couple's wedding was featured in The New York Times, and they were among the first same-sex couples to be profiled following the legalization of such marriages in some U.S. states. Dungan and Soloway later divorced in 2021.
