= Show Me What You Got (film) =

2021 indie film

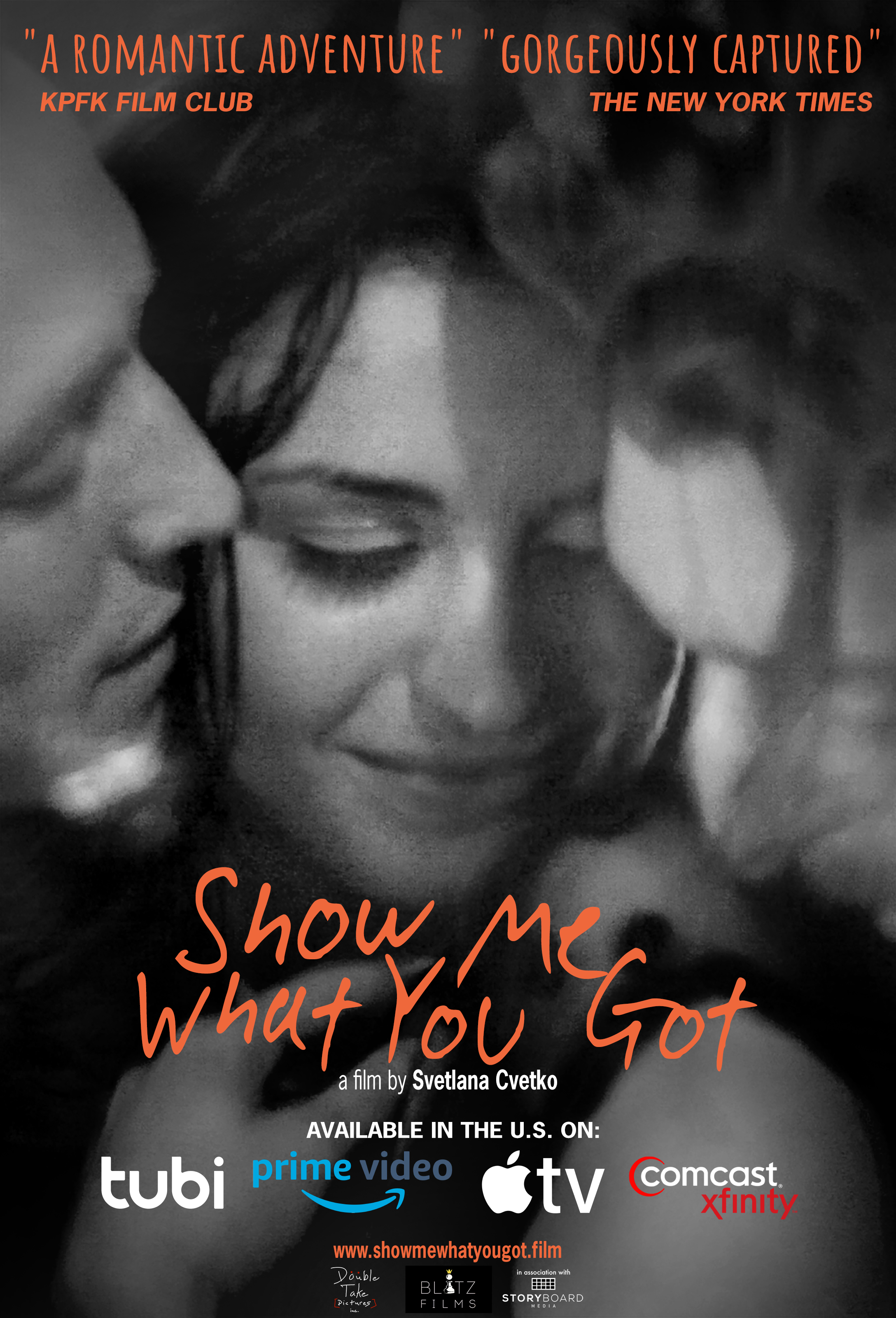
- Show Me What You Got film poster
- Directed by: Svetlana Cvetko
- Written by: Svetlana Cvetko; David Scott Smith
- Produced by: David Scott Smith; Nick Sarkisov; Phillip Noyce; Sergey Sarkisov
- Starring: Cristina Rambaldi; Neyssan Falahi; Mattia Minasi
- Cinematography: Svetlana Cvetko
- Edited by: David Scott Smith
- Music by: Eric Avery
- Production companies: Double Take Pictures; Blitz Films
- Distributed by: Level Forward (2021 Theatrical USA); Supersonic (VOD USA)
- Release date: 2021
- Country: United States
- Language: English

Show Me What You Got is a Black and white American independent film shot in Los Angeles, Italy and Joshua Tree that follows three millennials as they meet and form a ménage à trois. With the restless energy of a French New Wave film, the story follows the three as they join political protests and make art while falling deeper in love. When one has to leave for Italy, their experience there threatens their relationship.

== Cast ==
- Cristina Rambaldi as Christine di Carlo
- Neyssan Falahi as Nassim Jafari
- Mattia Minasi as Marcello Minasi
- Anne-Laure Jardry as Narrator (voice)
- Anne Brochet as Nassim’s Mother
- Karen Obilom as Nikki, the Executive
- Giusy Frallonardo as Claudia Minasi
- Pietro Genuardi as Riccardo Minasi

== Soundtrack ==
Original soundtrack written and performed by Jane's Addiction founder and bassist Eric Avery. Avery was jamming with his friend Josh Klinghoffer, guitarist at that time for the Red Hot Chili Peppers, and drummer Eric Gardner, who all agreed on the spot to record the film's opening song during the jam.

== Reception ==
"In director-cinematographer Svetlana Cvetko’s ambitious indie drama “Show Me What You Got,” three soulful twentysomethings bare their hearts and bodies to one another in sleek, polyamorous European-flavored style." (LAtimes)

"Svetlana Cvetko’s feature-length directorial debut, “Show Me What You Got,” tells an unconventional love story between an artist named Christine (Cristina Rambaldi), a martial arts instructor, Nassim (Neyssan Falahi), and Marcello (Mattia Minasi), the son of a famous Italian actor. Their life circumstances result in the fate of meeting and quickly immersing into the most beautiful Ménage à Troi I’ve seen on screen." (Irish Film Critic)

"The film is a visual feast, in crisp blacks and whites, depicting three beautiful young people in a romantic adventure which starts on the beaches of Malibu in LA, takes a detour in Joshua Tree National Park, and arrives in a gorgeously rendered Puglia in the natural radiance of southern Italy." (KFPK Film Club)

"The breakout performances of Rambaldi, Neyssan Falahi, and Mattia Minasi are noteworthy as the trio flows and carries one another through the end. They change and adapt, but stay connected." (Film Threat)

Lovia Gyarkye gives a mixed review in The New York Times.

== Awards and nominations ==
- Winner of Grand Jury Prize ‘Best Film’ at Taormina Film Festival
- Winner of Audience Award Best of Fest at High Falls Women’s Film Festival
- Winner of Best Cinematography at High Falls Women’s Film Festival
- Nominated for Best Emerging Director at St. Louis International Film Festival
- Winner of Best Cinematography at Santa Fe Film Festival
- Winner of Best of the Fest Grand Jury Prize at San Antonio Film Festival
