= Supercapitalism: The Transformation of Business, Democracy, and Everyday Life =

2007 book by Robert Reich

- Author: Robert Reich
- Language: English
- Subject: Capitalism, democracy
- Publisher: Alfred A. Knopf
- Publication date: September 4, 2007
- Publication place: United States
- Media type: Print (hardcover, paperback), e-book, audiobook
- Pages: 288
- ISBN: 0-307-26561-7
- Preceded by: Reason: Why Liberals Will Win the Battle for America
- Followed by: Aftershock: The Next Economy and America's Future

Supercapitalism: The Transformation of Business, Democracy, and Everyday Life is a book written by Robert Reich and published by New York publishing house Alfred A. Knopf in 2007. Reich was President Bill Clinton's Secretary of Labor.

In the book, Reich analyses the relationship between contemporary capitalism and democracy. "Why has capitalism become so triumphant and democracy so enfeebled?", he asks. He explains how in the relentless fight for profit, investors and consumers have made gains, but citizens and the democratic process have fallen behind.

== Summary ==
Reich sets out to compare the three decades after World War II with the recent decades noting that in that "Not Quite Golden Age" the interests of business, labor, community and government were generally in balance (the times were "Not Quite Golden" as sizable segments of the population were excluded, namely minorities and women). This balance of capitalism and democracy became unhinged in the 1970s with the advent of supercapitalism, Reich's term for the capitalistic system where companies have become more competitive, global and innovative seeking the highest profits for investors and offering the lowest prices for consumers. Advances in communication, technology, transportation and the concentrated power of innovative buying systems have created a far more competitive business environment. In this environment, corporations have become increasingly involved in politics and are now fighting in the political arena hiring "platoons of lobbyists, lawyers, experts and public-relations specialists" to shape government regulations to their advantage or the disadvantage of their competition. Their public relations masters shape the debates while their money fuels the political process. In this relentless fight about economic gains, investors and consumers profit. On the other side, the needs of the citizenry with an interest in social stability and the common good are neglected. Their voice is lost and their political impact marginalized. Reich supports his analysis with many examples. Reich indicates that our own dual nature being both investor/consumer and citizen is the problem as we look for a bargain, but close our eyes to the reality of its economic base; we may drive an SUV, but deplore climate change; and we look for high investment returns, but fail to invest with a long-term vision and moral insight.

Reich rejects the notion that corporations are people and are being invested with anthropomorphic qualities, saying: "Corporations are legal fictions, nothing more than bundles of contractual agreements" (p. 216). He says that corporations cannot be blamed for "corporate greed", nor can they be expected to promote the common good. They are legal entities with the purpose to make profits for investors and shareholders. A corporation will do its best to thrive within the framework that it is given; if it does not do so, it is at risk to be surpassed by the competition. Reich endeavors to debunk the concept of "corporate social responsibility", so it should not be the role of corporations to provide health coverage. Corporations are not people and should not be taxed, instead their investors and shareholder need to be taxed on the profits, for example. Corporations should not have the legal standing of a person in court and cannot act with criminal intent as "they have no human capacity for intent" (p. 219). Reich says corporations need to be subject to corporate civil liability as investors should not profit from illegal activity.

For Reich, unequivocally, the democratic process should be left only to people, not corporations. "Consumers, investors, executives and other employees all have a right to advance their interest in a democracy" (p. 223), but individually, not through anthropomorphic entities. A clear separation of business and politics will not be easy because "the largest impediment to reform is one brazen fact: Many politicians and lobbyists want to continue to extort money from the private sector. That's how politicians keep their hold on power and lobbyists keep their hold on money". For Reich, the first step to free democracy from the corporate encumbrance "is to get our thinking straight" (p. 225).

== Reviews ==
Robert Frank (The New York Times) describes Reich's book as a "grand debunking of conventional wisdom in the style of John Kenneth Galbraith" and indicates that "the main thrust of Reich’s argument is right on target".

Terry Burnham (Los Angeles Times) comments that "Reich’s view that our own human nature lies at the root of modern woes stands in refreshing contrast to standard left-right rhethoric". However, he faults Reich on his view of economic history and opines that American companies make enough profits to support social issues. Andrew Peaple writes that Reich's book is not a standard left-wing polemic and finds his list of remedies too short.

Michael Maiello (Forbes) comments that "Reich turns the standard liberal critique of corporations on its head" when he asserts that it is the agenda of corporations just to pursue profits and "the government’s job to safeguard the social welfare" and remains unconvinced that Reich has a solution to the problem of entrenched political interests and citizen detachment.
