= Jacob Kornbluth =

American film director

Jacob Kornbluth is the award-winning director of documentaries Inequality for All, and Saving Capitalism, and feature films Haiku Tunnel, Love & Taxes, and The Best Thief in the World. He was a producer on the TV show Years of Living Dangerously. His work on that show won a primetime Emmy. Kornbluth has had 3 films premiere at the Sundance Film Festival.

== Career ==
Kornbluth started his career as a writer and director in the theater. He collaborated on and directed three successful solo shows in San Francisco. "The Moisture Seekers", "Pumping Copy" (both with Josh Kornbluth), and "The Face By The Door" (with Christina Robbins). All three were nominated for or won "Best Of The Bay" awards and successfully toured the country, and a later version of "The Moisture Seekers" (called "Red Diaper Baby") has been included in anthologies of the best one man shows of the 90's.

Kornbluth was a fellow at the Sundance Screenwriting and Directing Labs. He has had 3 feature films premiere at the Sundance Film Festival – "Haiku Tunnel" (Sony Pictures Classics) and The Best Thief In the World" (Showtime Independent) were narrative films, and "Inequality For All" (Radius / Weinstein) was a documentary. "Inequality For All" won the special jury prize for excellence in filmmaking at Sundance 2013. In 2014 he was a producer on the Showtime series about climate change, “Years of Living Dangerously”, that is executive produced by James Cameron, Arnold Schwarzenegger, and Jerry Weintraub. His work on that show won an Emmy.

Kornbluth is co-director, with Robert Reich, of Inequality Media, a 501c3 that uses short videos to explain economic issues simply. He has directed over 100 videos for Inequality Media, and those videos had been viewed over 250 million times as of June 2017.

Kornbluth’s collaborations with W. Kamau Bell include the Shorty Award-winning video “A Tale of Two Tickets,” and the animated YouTube series "Talk Boring to Me". They cover social issues including asylum, public education, homelessness, and how motorists are treated differently for moving violations depending on race and socioeconomic status.

In his 2023 short film We’ve Been Here Before, Kornbluth and civil rights strategist Eric K. Ward explore the impact of the “Great Replacement Theory” on hateful acts by white nationalists, including mass shootings and antisemitic attacks.
