= Saving Capitalism =

2017 documentary film

- Directed by: Jacob Kornbluth; Sari Gilman
- Starring: Robert Reich
- Distributed by: Netflix
- Release date: November 21, 2017
- Running time: 73 minutes
- Country: United States
- Language: English

Saving Capitalism is a 2017 documentary film directed by Jacob Kornbluth and Sari Gilman, following former Secretary of Labor and Professor Robert Reich, speaking about the current state of the American economic system, and presents ideas how to "save capitalism".

The film was released by Netflix on November 11, 2017.

== Premise ==
The documentary is based on the book 'Saving Capitalism: For the Many, Not the Few' by Robert Reich. It follows the evolution of capitalism in America, from its beginnings to its current state.

== Cast ==
- Robert Reich
