= Facing Fear =

- Directed by: Jason Cohen
- Written by: Jason Cohen
- Produced by: Jason Cohen
- Starring: Matthew Boger, Tim Zaal
- Cinematography: Svetlana Cvetko
- Edited by: T.M. Christopher
- Music by: David Kesler
- Distributed by: Bullfrog Films (educational)
- Release date: July 2013
- Running time: 23 minutes

Facing Fear is a 2013 documentary film by Jason Cohen.

Facing Fear was a nominee for the 86th Academy Awards in the Best Documentary Short Subject category.

== Premise ==
A man goes on a global search to understand fear, after receiving some devastating news.

Awards
| Award | Date of ceremony | Category | Recipients and nominees | Result |
|---|---|---|---|---|
| Academy Award | March 2, 2014 | Best Short Subject Documentary | Jason Cohen | Nominated |
