= The Best Thief in the World =

- Directed by: Jacob Kornbluth
- Written by: Jacob Kornbluth
- Produced by: Tim Perrell; Nicola Usborne
- Starring: Mary-Louise Parker; Michael Silverman; David Warshofsky; Audra McDonald; Lois Smith
- Cinematography: Ben Kutchins
- Edited by: Stephanie Sterner
- Music by: Prince Paul and Don Newkirk
- Distributed by: Showtime Networks
- Release date: January 16, 2004
- Running time: 93 minutes
- Country: United States
- Language: English

The Best Thief in the World is a comedy-drama film directed by Jacob Kornbluth starring Mary-Louise Parker. The movie was released in 2004 at the Sundance Film Festival, and it aired on Showtime on January 11, 2005.

== Plot ==
The movie is about a kid named Izzy who lives in the New York City neighborhood of Washington Heights. His family faces a crisis after his father, Paul, suffers from a stroke. His mother, Sue, is an English teacher whose salary is only enough to pay the rent for their apartment. Izzy is trying to find ways to escape his problems by breaking into people's apartments. Izzy does not steal things from houses, instead he eats food, moves around the furniture, writes words on walls, takes showers, and burn pieces of paper. Izzy hangs out with a group of kids who are hoodlums. When Paul's medical insurance is running out, Sue decides to bring Paul back home and take care of him by herself. When Izzy tries again to break in, he gets caught when the homeowners are at home having sexual intercourse. Izzy is subsequently taken to the local police station.

== Cast ==
- Mary-Louise Parker as Sue Zaidman
- Michael Silverman as Izzy Zaidman
- David Warshofsky as Paul Zaidman
- Audra McDonald as Ruth
- Lois Smith as Helen
- Margo Martindale as Miss Mason
- Jelani Jeffries as Robbie
- Chelsea Harkins as Amy Zaidman
- Jonah Bobo as Sam Zaidman
- Tom Bloom as Dr. Challop
- Shortee Red as Edwin "Big Edwin"
- T.J. Allen as "Dice"
- Tanya Clarke as Mary
- Wade Mylius as Harry
- Trevor Ryan Clegg as Zeke
