= Phillip Noyce =

Australian filmmaker (born 1950)

Phillip Noyce AO
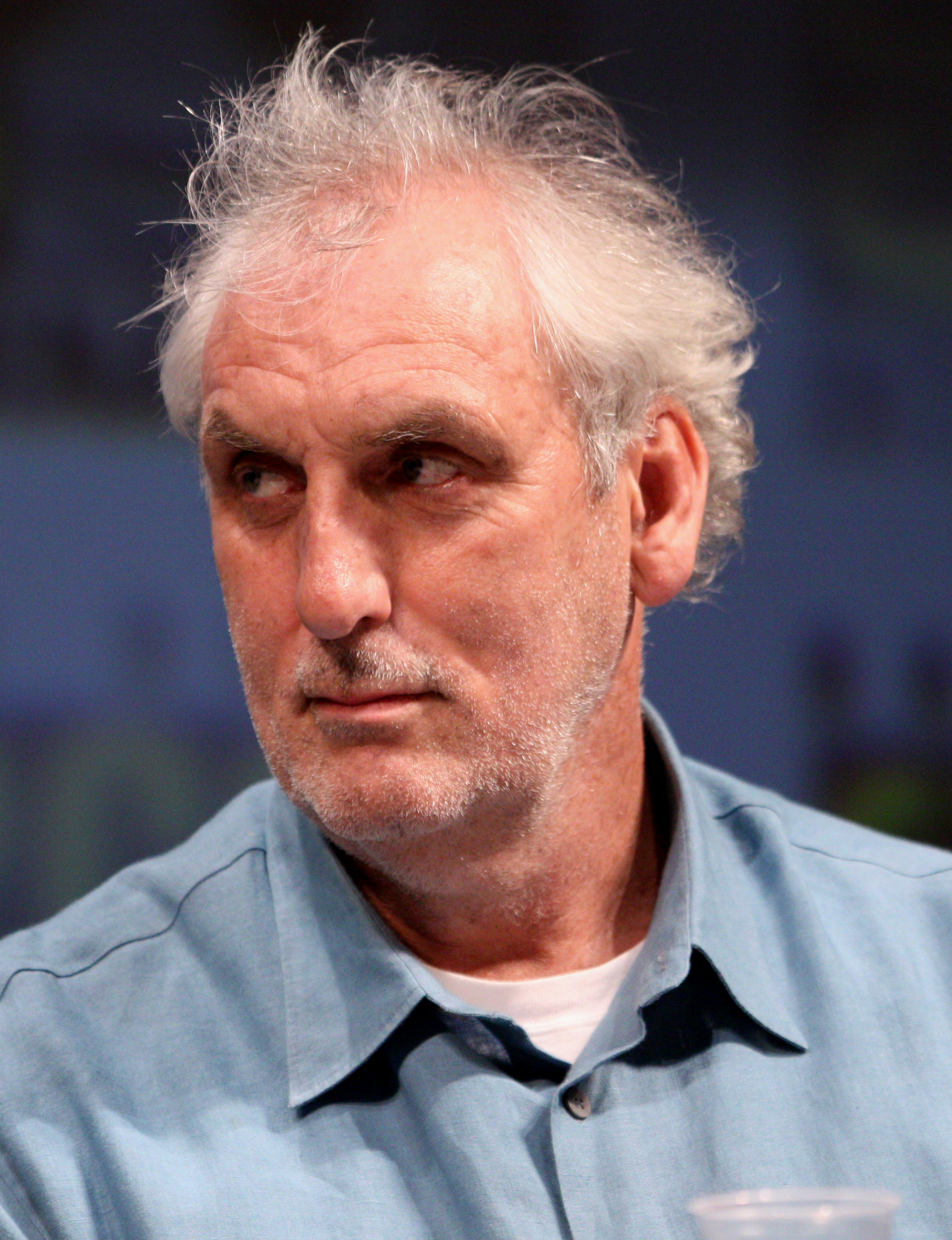
- Noyce in 2010
- Born: 29 April 1950 (age 76); Griffith, New South Wales, Australia
- Education: University of Sydney; Australian Film, Television and Radio School
- Occupations: Director; producer; screenwriter
- Years active: 1969–present
- Known for: Rabbit-Proof Fence, Dead Calm, Clear and Present Danger, Roots (2016)

Phillip Roger Noyce AO (born 29 April 1950) is an Australian film and television director. Since 1977, he has directed over 19 feature films in various genres, including historical drama (Newsfront, Rabbit-Proof Fence, The Quiet American); thrillers (Dead Calm, Sliver, The Bone Collector); and action films (Blind Fury, The Saint, Salt). He has also directed the Jack Ryan adaptations Patriot Games (1992) and Clear and Present Danger (1994), as well as the 2014 adaptation of Lois Lowry's The Giver.

Noyce has worked at various times with such actors as Val Kilmer, Harrison Ford, Denzel Washington, Michael Caine, Angelina Jolie, Nicole Kidman, Meryl Streep, Rutger Hauer and three films with Thora Birch over 25 years. He has also directed, written and executive-produced television programmes in both Australia and North America, including The Cowra Breakout, Vietnam, Revenge, Roots, and Netflix's What/If.

Noyce's work has won him several accolades, including AACTA Awards for Best Film, Best Director and a special Longford Lyell lifetime achievement award.

== Early life and education ==
Phillip Roger Noyce was born on 29 April 1950 in Griffith, New South Wales.

He attended high school at Barker College in Sydney, and began making short films at the age of 18. His first short film, the 15-minute Better to Reign in Hell, was financed by selling roles to his friends.

He graduated from Sydney University, and then attended the Australian Film, Television and Radio School in 1973.

In 1969, Noyce ran the Sydney Filmmakers Co-op, a collective of filmmakers. With Jan Chapman, he ran the Filmmaker's Cinema for three years above a bookshop in Sydney, screening the short films of the directors who would go on to form the Australian New Wave: Gillian Armstrong, Peter Weir, Bruce Beresford, George Miller and Paul Cox.

== Career ==
Noyce released his first professional film in 1975. Many of his films feature espionage, as Noyce grew up listening to his father's stories of serving with the Australian Commando unit Z Force during World War II.

After his debut feature, the medium-length Backroads (1977), Noyce achieved huge commercial and critical success with Newsfront (1978), which won Australian Film Institute (AFI) awards for Best Film, Director, Actor and Screenplay; it opened the London Film Festival and was the first Australian film to play at the New York Film Festival.

Noyce worked on two miniseries for Australian television with fellow Australian filmmaker George Miller: The Dismissal (1983) and The Cowra Breakout (1984). Miller also produced the film that brought Noyce to the attention of Hollywood studios – Dead Calm (1988), which also launched the career of Nicole Kidman. After Dead Calm, Noyce went to the US to direct Blind Fury, starring Rutger Hauer, for Tri-Star Pictures.

Moving with his young family to the US in 1991, Noyce directed five films over the following eight years, of which Clear and Present Danger, starring Harrison Ford, was the most successful, critically and commercially, grossing $216 million. After 1999's Bone Collector starring Angelina Jolie and Denzel Washington, Noyce decided to return to Australia for the Stolen Generations saga Rabbit-Proof Fence, which won the AFI Award for Best Film in 2002. He has described Rabbit-Proof Fence as "easily" his proudest moment as a director: "Showing that film to various Aboriginal communities around the country and seeing their response, because it gave validity to the experiences of the Stolen Generations."

Noyce was also lauded for The Quiet American, the 2002 adaptation of Graham Greene's novel, which gave Michael Caine an Academy Award Best Actor nomination and earned best director awards from London Film Critics' Circle and National Board of Review in the US. After the apartheid-set Catch a Fire (2006) in South Africa, Noyce decided to make another big budget studio film with 2010's Salt starring Angelina Jolie, which proved to be his biggest commercial hit to date, making nearly $300 million worldwide.

In 2011, Noyce directed and executive produced the pilot for the American Broadcasting Company series Revenge and has since directed numerous TV pilots, including Netflix's What/If starring Renée Zellweger and the FOX Network hit The Resident. In 2017, he signed a first look deal with 20th Century Fox Television.

Above Suspicion, starring Emilia Clarke and Jack Huston, originally to be released in America in 2020 by Roadside Attractions, was delayed until May 2021 due to the Coronavirus Pandemic.

In 2021, Noyce became executive producer on the film Show Me What You Got, written and directed by Svetlana Cvetko.

The Desperate Hour, starring Naomi Watts, was released in the US by Roadside Attractions in March 2022.

In late 2021, a 17 feature and 10 shorts retrospective of Noyce's work was presented at the Cinémathèque Française in Paris.

Noyce's next film, Fast Charlie, a darkly comedic thriller starring Pierce Brosnan, Morena Baccarin and James Caan, written by Richard Wenk was released in the US in December 2023, earning Noyce highly positive reviews.

== Other activities ==
As of 2024 Noyce is an ambassador for SmartFone Flick Fest (SF3), held annually in Sydney.

== Recognition, honours, and awards ==
In the Australia Day Honours in January 2023, Noyce was made an Officer of the Order of Australia (AO) by the Australian Government.

Year	Title	Awards and nominations
1978	Newsfront	Australian Film Institute Award for Best Director; Australian Film Institute Award for Best Screenplay, Original; Best First Film Award (Taormina Film Fest); Best Director Award (Taormina Film Fest); Nominated- Golden Charybdis (Taormina Film Fest)
1982	Heatwave	Special Mention (Mystfest); Nominated- Best Film of Festival Award (Mystfest)
1989	Dead Calm	Nominated- Australian Film Institute Award for Best Director
2002	Rabbit-Proof Fence	Australian Film Institute Award for Best Film; Christopher Award for Best Film; Film Critics Circle of Australia Award for Best Director; London Film Critics' Circle Award for Director of the Year (shared with The Quiet American); National Board of Review Award for Best Director (shared with The Quiet American); San Francisco Film Critics Circle Special Citation (shared with The Quiet American); Audience Award (Durban International Film Festival); Audience Award (Edinburgh International Film Festival); Audience Award (Leeds International Film Festival); Audience Award for Best Foreign-Language Film (São Paulo International Film Festival); Audience Award for Feature Film (Valladolid International Film Festival); People's Choice Award for Beat Feature-Length Fiction Film (Denver Film Festival); Nominated- Australian Film Institute Award for Best Director; Nominated- Inside Film Award for Best Director
2002	The Quiet American	London Film Critics' Circle Award for Director of the Year (shared with Rabbit-Proof Fence); National Board of Review Award for Best Director (shared with Rabbit-Proof Fence); San Francisco Film Critics Circle Special Citation (shared with Rabbit-Proof Fence); Nominated- Satellite Award for Best Director; Nominated- Golden Kinnaree Award for Best Film (Bangkok International Film Festival)
2014	The Giver	Truly Moving Picture Award - Feature Film (Heartland Film Festival)
2024	Satyajit Ray Lifetime Achievement Award	55th International Film Festival of India

== Filmography ==
=== Films ===
Year	Title	Director	Producer	Writer
1977	Backroads	Yes	Yes	Yes
1978	Newsfront	Yes	No	Yes
1982	Heatwave	Yes	No	Yes
1987	Echoes of Paradise	Yes	No	No
1989	Dead Calm	Yes	No	No
1989	Blind Fury	Yes	No	No
1992	Patriot Games	Yes	No	No
1993	Sliver	Yes	No	No
1994	Clear and Present Danger	Yes	No	No
1997	The Saint	Yes	No	No
1999	The Bone Collector	Yes	No	No
2002	Rabbit-Proof Fence	Yes	Yes	No
2002	The Quiet American	Yes	No	No
2006	Catch a Fire	Yes	No	No
2010	Salt	Yes	No	No
2014	The Giver	Yes	No	No
2021	Above Suspicion	Yes	No	No
2022	The Desperate Hour	Yes	No	No
2023	Fast Charlie	Yes	No	No
TBA	Ally Clark	Yes	No	No

Executive producer

- Show Me What You Got (2021)

==== Short films ====
Year	Title	Director	Producer
1969	Better to Reign in Hell	Yes	Yes
1971	Sun	Yes	Yes
1971	Memories	Yes	Yes
1971	Intersection	Yes	Yes
1971	Home	Yes	Yes
1971	Camera Class	Yes	Yes
1973	That's Showbiz	Yes	No
1973	Castor and Pollux	Yes	No
1973	Caravan Park	Yes	Yes
1974	Renegades: Fragments from a Diary of Three Years Experience 1970-73	Yes	Yes
1975	Finks Make Movies	Yes	Yes
1977	Disco	Yes	No
1978	Tapak Dewata Java	Yes	No
1979	Sue and Mario: The Italian Australians	Yes	No
1979	Bali: Island of the Gods	Yes	No

==== Documentary films ====
Year	Title	Director	Producer	Notes
1971	Good Afternoon	Yes	Yes	
1976	God Knows Why, But It Works	Yes	Yes	
2004	Welcome to São Paulo	Yes	Yes	Segment "Marca Zero"

=== Television ===
TV movies

- Fact and Fiction (1980)
- Three Vietnamese Stories (1980)
- Mary and Martha (2013)

TV series

Year	Title	Director	Producer	Writer	Notes
1983	The Dismissal	Yes	No	Yes	Miniseries; Director - Episode: "Part Two"
1984	The Cowra Breakout	Yes	No	Yes	Miniseries; 3 episodes
1985-89	The Hitchhiker	Yes	No	No	5 episodes
1987	Vietnam	No	Yes	Yes	Miniseries
1992	Nightmare Cafe	Yes	No	No	Episode "Pilot"
1998	The Repair Shop	Yes	No	No	Unaired pilot
2003	Tru Calling	Yes	Executive	No	Director - Episode "Pilot"; Executive producer - 2 episodes
2006-07	Brotherhood	Yes	Executive	No	Director - 2 episodes Executive producer - 3 episodes
2011-12	Revenge	Yes	Yes	No	Director - 2 episodes Consulting producer - 21 episodes Executive producer - 2 episodes
2011	Lights Out	No	Executive	No	3 episodes
2012	Americana	Yes	Executive	No	Unaired pilot
2012	Luck	Yes	No	No	Episode "Ace Meets With a Colleague"
2014	Crisis	Yes	No	No	Director - Episode: "Pilot"; Executive producer - 13 episodes
2015	Warrior	Yes	No	No	Unaired pilot
2016	Roots	Yes	No	No	Miniseries; Episode "Part 1"
2018	The Resident	Yes	No	No	Director - 2 episodes Executive producer - 40 episodes
2019	What/If	Yes	Executive	No	Director - 2 episodes

=== Unmade films ===
- Simmonds and Newcombe (late 1970s) – about the manhunt for Simmonds and Newcombe
- King Hit (late 1970s) – about the dismissal of the Whitlam government
