= Virtually Heroes =

- Film poster
- Directed by: G.J. Echternkamp
- Written by: Matt Yamashita; G.J. Echternkamp
- Produced by: Roger Corman; G.J. Echternkamp; Dwjuan F. Fox
- Starring: Robert Baker; Mark Hamill; Brent Chase; Katie Savoy
- Cinematography: James Mann
- Production company: New Horizons Picture Corp.
- Distributed by: Screen Media
- Release dates: January 18, 2013 (Sundance Film Festival); January 17, 2023 (VOD)
- Country: United States
- Language: English

Virtually Heroes is a 2013 American low-budget gamer film directed by G.J. Echternkamp and starring Robert Baker and Mark Hamill. Produced by Roger Corman, it made its world premiere at the 2013 Sundance Film Festival.

== Plot ==
Two self-aware characters in a Call of Duty-inspired video game battle endless supplies of Vietcong, absurdly powerful level bosses and their own existential crises. With the help of Mark Hamill's Yoda-like monk, they attempt to win the game and "get the girl."

== Production ==
Virtually Heroes evolved from Roger Corman's desire to utilize his extensive library of stock footage to create a modern war film. Since the 1970s, Corman produced over 20 war films with Filipino director Cirio H. Santiago. Writers G.J. Echternkamp and Matt Yamashita drew heavily on Corman's library to write their script, developing a video game world to justify the repurposed stock footage.

"I thought if I could find a way to use the big battle scenes from all of these pictures and put it together in a new picture and shoot just a short period of time to tie them all together, I could get a big-looking picture for very little money," Corman said in an interview.

Because of the shoestring-budget, most of the film had to be block-shot. Most of the takes were done only twice.

== Release ==
Virtually Heroes was Roger Corman's first submission to enter the Sundance Film Festival. It remained unavailable for nearly a decade until Screen Media announced that it had acquired the film for release on August 19, 2022, and would give the film a limited theatrical and digital release in December 2022, followed by a release on the Crackle Plus platform Popcornflix. It was released on VOD on January 17, 2023.

== Films featured ==
Virtually Heroes uses footage from the following Corman pictures:

- Battle Gear (1991)
- Beyond the Call of Duty (1992)
- Eye of the Eagle (1987)
- Eye of the Eagle 2: Inside the Enemy (1989)
- Eye of the Eagle 3: Last Stand at Lang Mei (1989)
- Firehawk (1993)
- Kill Zone (1993)
- Saigon Commandos (1988)
- When Eagles Strike (2003)
