= 2013 Sundance Film Festival =

Film festival held from January 17, 2013 until January 27, 2013

- Festival poster
- Opening film: May In the Summer
- Closing film: Jobs
- Location: Park City, Salt Lake City, Ogden, and Sundance, Utah
- Hosted by: Sundance Institute
- Festival date: January 17–27, 2013
- Language: English
- Website: sundance.org/festival
- 2014 Sundance Film Festival 2012 Sundance Film Festival

The 2013 Sundance Film Festival took place from January 17, 2013, until January 27, 2013, in Park City, Utah, United States, with screenings in Salt Lake City, Utah, Ogden, Utah, and Sundance, Utah.

The festival had 1,830 volunteers.

== Films ==
A record 12,146 films were submitted, 429 more films than the 2012 festival. 4,044 feature films were submitted and 119 were selected (with 103 of them being world premieres). 8,102 short films were submitted and 65 were selected. The festival had films representing 32 countries, from 51 first-time filmmakers, 27 of which had films in competition.

For the first time in the festival's history, half of the films featured were made by women and half by men. In the U.S. dramatic competition, 8 directors were women and 8 were men. In the U.S. documentary competition, 8 directors were women and 8 were men. In the dramatic premieres category, however, only 3 of the 18 films were directed by women.

Cara Mertes, director of the Sundance Institute Documentary Film Program and Sundance Documentary Fund, said that of the 40 documentaries at this year's festival, 12 of them came through the Documentary Film Program, which "really came here in 2002." Linsanity, a documentary about the rise of Asian American basketball player Jeremy Lin, premiered to a sold-out screening on January 20. The Los Angeles Times wrote that it received a "rousing response, easily making it one of the most crowd-pleasing documentaries to play the festival this year."

== Non-competition features ==
=== Midnight ===
- Ass Backwards
- Hell Baby
- In Fear
- Kink
- Magic Magic
- The Rambler
- S-VHS
- Virtually Heroes
- We Are What We Are

== Awards ==
The awards ceremony was held on January 26, 2013, a few miles north of Park City, Utah at Kimball Junction at the Basin Recreation Fieldhouse, and was hosted by Joseph Gordon-Levitt.

- U.S. Grand Jury Prize: Documentary - Blood Brother
- U.S. Grand Jury Prize: Dramatic - Fruitvale (later retitled Fruitvale Station)
- World Cinema Grand Jury Prize: Documentary - A River Changes Course
- World Cinema Grand Jury Prize: Dramatic - Jiseul
- Audience Award: U.S. Documentary - Blood Brother
- Audience Award: U.S. Dramatic - Fruitvale (later retitled Fruitvale Station)
- Audience Award: World Cinema Documentary - The Square (Al-Midan)
- Audience Award: World Cinema Dramatic - Metro Manila
- Audience Award: Best of NEXT - This is Martin Bonner
- Directing Award: U.S. Documentary - Cutie and the Boxer
- Directing Award: U.S. Dramatic - Afternoon Delight
- Directing Award: World Cinema Documentary - The Machine Which Makes Everything Disappear
- Directing Award: World Cinema Dramatic - Crystal Fairy
- Waldo Salt Screenwriting Award: U.S. Dramatic - In a World...
- Screenwriting Award: World Cinema Dramatic - Wajma (An Afghan Love Story)
- Editing Award: U.S. Documentary - Gideon's Army
- Editing Award: World Cinema Documentary - The Summit
- Cinematography Award: U.S. Documentary - Dirty Wars: The World Is a Battlefield
- Cinematography Award: U.S. Dramatic - Ain't Them Bodies Saints and Mother of George
- Cinematography Award: World Cinema Documentary - Who is Dayani Cristal?
- Cinematography Award: World Cinema Dramatic - Lasting
- U.S. Documentary Special Jury Award for Achievement in Filmmaking - Inequality for All
- U.S. Documentary Special Jury Award for Achievement in Filmmaking - American Promise
- U.S. Dramatic Special Jury Award for Acting - Miles Teller and Shailene Woodley for The Spectacular Now
- U.S. Dramatic Special Jury Award for Sound Design - Shane Carruth, Johnny Marshall and Pete Horner for Upstream Color
- World Cinema Dramatic Special Jury Award - Circles
- World Cinema Documentary Special Jury Award for Punk Spirit - Pussy Riot: A Punk Prayer
- Short Film Audience Award - Catnip: Egress to Oblivion?
- Alfred P. Sloan Feature Film Prize - Computer Chess

Additional awards were presented at separate ceremonies. The Shorts Awards were presented January 22, 2013 at the Jupiter Bowl at Redstone Square.

- Short Film Grand Jury Prize - The Whistle
- Short Film Jury Award: U.S. Fiction - Whiplash
- Short Film Jury Award: International Fiction - The Date
- Short Film Jury Award: Non-fiction - Skinningrove
- Short Film Jury Award: Animation - Irish Folk Furniture
- Short Film Special Jury Award for Acting - Joel Nagle in Palimpsest
- Short Film Special Jury Award - Until the Quiet Comes
- Sundance Institute/Mahindra Global Filmmaking Awards - Sarthak Dasgupta for The Music Teacher, Jonas Carpignano for A Chjana, Aly Muritiba for The Man Who Killed My Beloved Dead, Vendela Vida and Eva Weber for Let The Northern Lights Erase Your Name
- Sundance Institute/NHK Filmmaker Award - Kentaro Hagiwara for Spectacled Tiger
- Hilton Worldwide LightStay Sustainability Award - Revolutionary Optimists and Hungry; honorable mention to Studio H, and $5,000 to the short film Jungle Fish
- 2013 Indian Paintbrush Producer's Award - Toby Halbrooks and James M. Johnston for Ain't Them Bodies Saints (and $10,000 grant)

For the first time since 2009, the same film won the top awards from judges and audiences. Fruitvale won both the U.S. Dramatic Grand Jury Prize, and the U.S. Dramatic Audience Award. Blood Brother also won both top prizes in the U.S. Documentary competition, the Grand Jury Prize and the Audience Award.

== Juries ==
Nineteen of the jury members, which award prizes to films, were announced on December 19, 2012. The 5 members of the Alfred P. Sloan Jury, which would also take part in the Science in Film Forum Panel, were announced on January 17, 2013. Presenters of awards are followed by asterisks:

U.S. Documentary Jury

- Liz Garbus*
- Davis Guggenheim*
- Gary Hustwit*
- Brett Morgen*
- Diane Weyermann*

U.S. Dramatic Jury

- Ed Burns*
- Wesley Morris*
- Rodrigo Prieto*
- Tom Rothman*
- Clare Stewart*

World Documentary Jury

- Sean Farnel*
- Robert Hawk*
- Enat Sidi*

World Dramatic Jury

- Anurag Kashyap*
- Nadine Labaki*
- Joana Vicente*

Alfred P. Sloan Jury

- Paula S. Apsell
- Darren Aronofsky
- Scott Z. Burns
- Dr. André Fenton
- Dr. Lisa Randall*

Short Film Jury

- Mike Farah*
- Don Hertzfeldt*
- Magali Simard*

Others who presented awards included Barbara Kopple, Joseph Gordon-Levitt, and Mariel Hemingway.

== Festival theaters ==
- Park City
  - Eccles Theatre - 1,270 seats
  - Egyptian Theatre - 290 seats
  - Holiday Village Cinema 1 - 164 seats
  - Holiday Village Cinema 2 - 156 seats
  - Holiday Village Cinema 4 - 164 seats
  - Library Center Theatre - 486 seats
  - The MARC Theatre - 525 seats
  - Prospector Square Theatre - 336 seats
  - Redstone Cinema 1 - 188 seats
  - Redstone Cinema 2 - 175 seats
  - Temple Theatre - 314 seats
  - Yarrow Hotel Theatre - 295 seats
- Salt Lake City
  - Broadway Cinema 3 - 306 seats
  - Broadway Cinema 6 - 274 seats
  - Rose Wagner Performing Arts Center - 495 seats
  - SLC Library - 300 seats
  - Tower Theatre - 349 seats
- Sundance Resort
  - Sundance Resort Screening Room - 164 seats
- Ogden
  - Peery's Egyptian Theatre - 840 seats

=== Sundance Film Festival U.S.A. ===
On January 31, 2013, the festival sent 10 filmmakers to 10 cities across the US to screen and discuss their films. The cities and films were:

- Ann Arbor, Michigan at Michigan Theater - The East
- Boston, Massachusetts at Coolidge Corner Theatre - The Lifeguard
- Brooklyn, New York at BAM - Kill Your Darlings
- Chicago, Illinois at Music Box Theatre - Touchy Feely
- Houston, Texas at Sundance Cinemas Houston - Ain't Them Bodies Saints
- Los Angeles, California at Sundance Sunset Cinema - Afternoon Delight
- Nashville, Tennessee at The Belcourt Theatre - Mother of George
- Orlando, Florida at Enzian Theater - A.C.O.D.
- San Francisco, California at Sundance Kabuki Cinemas - In a World...
- Tucson, Arizona at The Loft - The Spectacular Now

== Reception ==
Matt Patches of Hollywood.com wrote that the festival is more important than ever after Beasts of the Southern Wild, which debuted at the 2012 Sundance Film Festival, winning the U.S. Dramatic Grand Jury Prize and the U.S. Dramatic Cinematography Award, and going on to garner four Oscar nominations at the 85th Academy Awards (Best Picture, Best Director, Best Adapted Screenplay, and Best Actress). He wrote, "we're living in a post-Beasts world where a Sundance unknown can end a year-long journey at the Best Directors table." He said "studios are looking to Sundance for recommendations." Robert Redford said Beasts of the Southern Wild "is probably one of the great examples that we have of why Sundance is here and what my intention was to begin with." Kristopher Tapley wrote the film "was nurtured through the Sundance Institute's system every step of the way", mentioning the Screenwriters Lab, the Directors Lab, and funding at the Creative Producing Summit.

Regarding the festival, Redford said "I never dreamed when we started — we didn't even know that we would last — and then when it lasted and grew, it became huge. I never anticipated that it would get to this size." Kenneth Turan mentioned the number of films submitted and the few selected, saying "the sameness of those chosen from year to year is disheartening." He wrote "it almost feels as if programmers are filling specific, pre-ordained slots", and mentioned there are always too many teenage coming-of-age films. He said the festival is "inevitably a mixed bag, where excitement combines with frustration..." Turan wrote that "Sundance remains the nonpareil launching pad for tiny films that would never reach maximum altitude otherwise", saying that "without the heat generated by this festival", there is no way Beasts of the Southern Wild would have gotten four Oscar nominations. He praised the New Frontier exhibitions. Turan wrote, "As always, the spectrum in documentary was most impressive." And said Sundance "is looking more and more like the best doc festival in the world." At the 85th Academy Awards, four of the five nominated documentary features premiered at the 2012 Sundance Film Festival, and the fifth, The Gatekeepers, was shown at this year's festival.

== Acquisitions ==
Acquisitions at the festival included the following:

Domestic Rights

- A24 Films
  - The Spectacular Now
- CBS Films
  - Toy's House (later retitled The Kings of Summer)
- CNN Films
  - Blackfish (jointly with Magnolia Pictures)
- eOne
  - We Are What We Are
- Exclusive Releasing
  - Two Mothers
- Fox Searchlight
  - The Way, Way Back
- Icarus Films
  - The Machine Which Makes Everything Disappear
- IFC Films
  - Ain't Them Bodies Saints
  - The Look of Love
- Magnolia Pictures
  - Blackfish (jointly with CNN Films)
  - Prince Avalanche
  - S-VHS (later retitled V/H/S/2)
- Mundial
  - Who Is Dayani Cristal?
- Open Road Films
  - jOBS
- Oscilloscope Laboratories
  - Mother of George
- Participant Media
  - 99%–The Occupy Wall St. Collaborative Film
- Phase 4 Films
  - Milkshake
  - Newlyweeds
- Relativity Media
  - Don Jon's Addiction (later retitled Don Jon)
- Sony Pictures Classics
  - Austenland
  - Before Midnight
  - Kill Your Darlings
- Showtime
  - History of the Eagles Part 1
- The Weinstein Company
  - The Weinstein Company
    - Fruitvale (later retitled Fruitvale Station)
  - RADiUS-TWC
    - Concussion
    - Cutie and the Boxer
    - Inequality for All
    - Lovelace
    - 20 Feet from Stardom

International Rights

- Content
  - Concussion
- Memento Film
  - S-VHS (later retitled V/H/S/2)
- QED International
  - Toy's House (later retitled The Kings of Summer)
