= Robert Reich =

American former labor secretary and political commentator (born 1946)

- Reich in 2026

22nd United States Secretary of Labor
- In office January 22, 1993 – January 20, 1997
- President: Bill Clinton
- Preceded by: Lynn M. Martin
- Succeeded by: Alexis Herman

Personal details
- Born: Robert Bernard Reich; June 24, 1946 (age 80) Scranton, Pennsylvania, U.S.
- Party: Democratic
- Spouses: Clare Dalton (m. 1973; div. 2012); Perian Flaherty
- Children: 2, including Sam
- Education: Dartmouth College (BA); University College, Oxford (MA); Yale University (JD)
- Awards: The VIZE 97 Prize (2003)
- Website: robertreich.org

YouTube information
- Channel: Robert Reich
- Years active: 2015–present
- Subscribers: 1.42 million
- Views: 205.02 million
- Last updated: January 2026
- Robert Reich's voice Reich supporting the National Popular Vote Interstate Compact. Published May 9, 2023

Robert Bernard Reich (/raɪʃ/; born June 24, 1946) is an American professor, author, lawyer, and political commentator. He worked in the administrations of presidents Gerald Ford and Jimmy Carter, and he served as secretary of labor in the cabinet of President Bill Clinton from 1993 to 1997. He was also a member of President Barack Obama's economic transition advisory board. In 2008, Time magazine named him one of the Ten Most Effective Cabinet Members of the century; in the same year The Wall Street Journal placed him sixth on its list of Most Influential Business Thinkers.

Reich has also had a long teaching career. From 1981 to 1992 he was a lecturer at Harvard University's John F. Kennedy School of Government and from 1997 to 2005 he was a professor of social and economic policy at the Heller School for Social Policy and Management of Brandeis University. In January 2006 he was appointed Chancellor's Professor of Public Policy at the Goldman School of Public Policy at UC Berkeley. He taught his last class at Berkeley in the spring of 2023 and is currently emeritus Carmel P. Friesen Professor of Public Policy.

Reich has published numerous books, including the best-sellers The Work of Nations (1991), Reason (2004), Supercapitalism (2007), Aftershock (2010), Beyond Outrage (2012), and Saving Capitalism (2015). The Robert Reich–Jacob Kornbluth film Saving Capitalism debuted on Netflix in November 2017, and their film Inequality for All won a U.S. Documentary Special Jury Award for Achievement in Filmmaking at the 2013 Sundance Film Festival. He is board chair emeritus of the watchdog group Common Cause and blogs at Robertreich.org.

== Early life and career ==
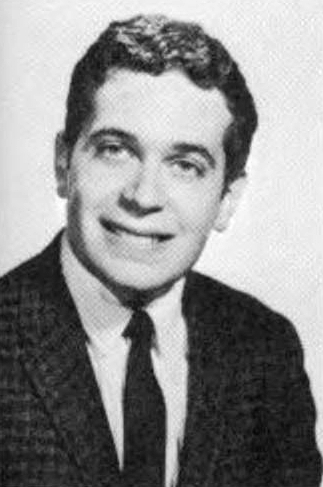
Reich in the Dartmouth College yearbook, 1968

Reich was born to a Jewish family in Scranton, Pennsylvania, the son of Mildred Freshman (née Dorf; 1919–2006) and Edwin Saul Reich (1914–2016), who owned a women's clothing store. As a teenager, he was diagnosed with multiple epiphyseal dysplasia, also known as Fairbank's disease, a genetic disorder that results in short stature and other symptoms. This condition made Reich a target for bullies, and he sought out the protection of older boys; one of them was Michael Schwerner, who was one of the three civil rights workers murdered in Mississippi by the Ku Klux Klan in 1964 for registering African-American voters. Reich cites this event as an inspiration to "fight the bullies, to protect the powerless, to make sure that the people without a voice have a voice".

Reich attended John Jay High School in Cross River, New York, where he received a National Merit Scholarship. He graduated from Dartmouth College in 1968 with a bachelor's degree in history, summa cum laude. While at Dartmouth, Reich went on a date with Hillary Rodham (later Clinton), then an undergraduate at Wellesley College. He won a Rhodes Scholarship to study Philosophy, Politics, and Economics at University College, Oxford. While studying at Oxford, Reich first met Bill Clinton, also a Rhodes Scholar. Although Reich was drafted to serve in the Vietnam War, he did not pass the physical examination; due to his dysplasia condition, Reich is 4 feet 11 inches (1.50 m) tall, shorter than the required minimum height of 5 ft 0 in (1.52 m). Reich received his M.A. from the University of Oxford in 1970. He subsequently earned a J.D. from Yale Law School, where he was an editor of the Yale Law Journal. At Yale, he was a classmate of Bill Clinton, Hillary Rodham, Clarence Thomas, Michael Medved, and Richard Blumenthal.

From 1973 to 1974, Reich served as a law clerk to Judge Frank M. Coffin, chief judge of the U.S. Court of Appeals for the First Circuit. From 1974 to 1976, he was an assistant to U.S. Solicitor General Robert Bork, under whom he had studied antitrust law while at Yale. In 1977, President Jimmy Carter appointed him as director of the policy planning staff at the Federal Trade Commission. From 1980 until 1992, Reich taught at the John F. Kennedy School of Government at Harvard University, where he wrote a series of books and articles, including The Next American Frontier and The Work of Nations.

== Tenure as secretary of labor ==
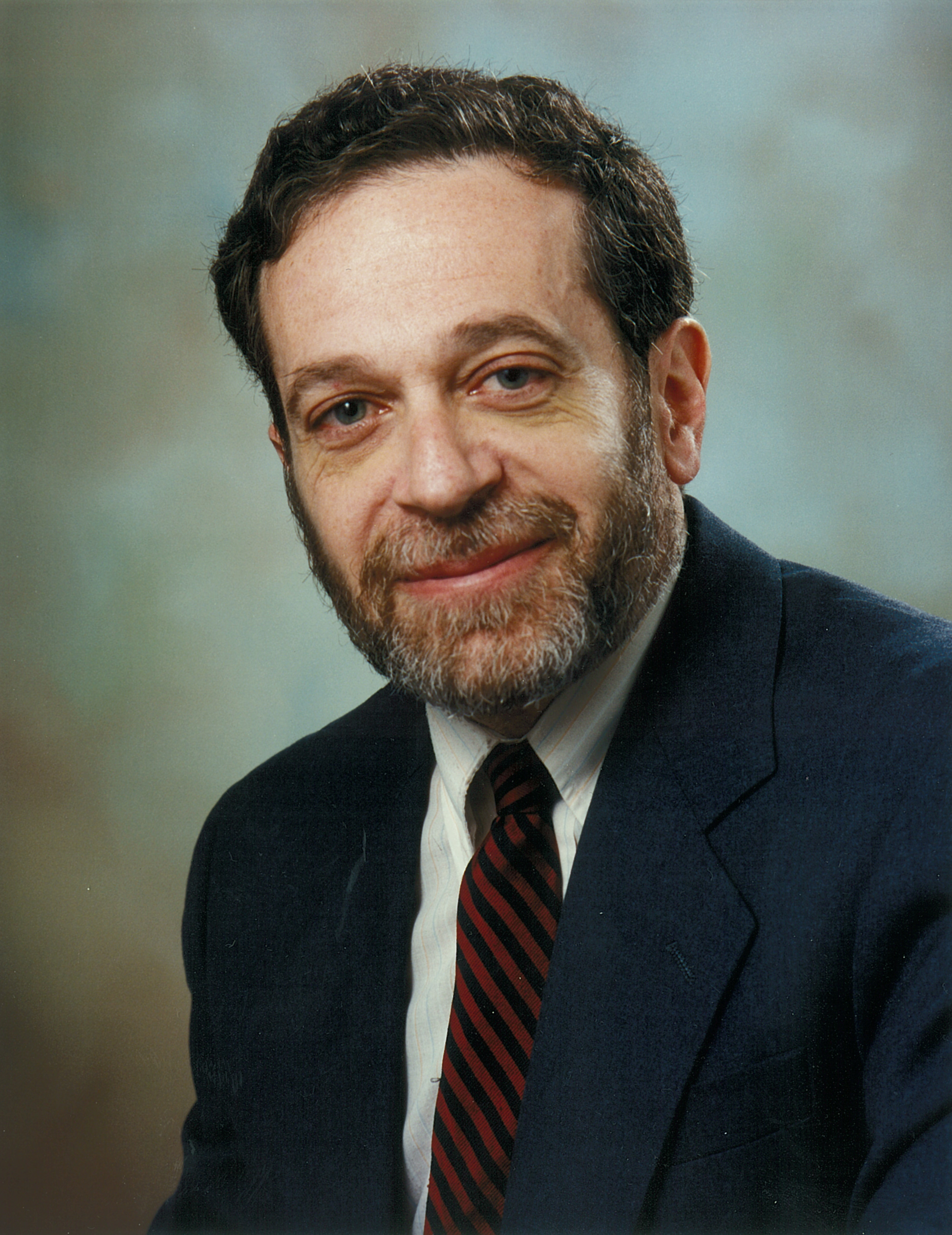
Reich's official Department of Labor portrait, 1993

Bill Clinton incorporated Reich's thinking into his 1992 campaign platform, and after Clinton won the election, he appointed Reich to head economic policy for the presidential transition.

Reich joined the administration as secretary of labor. On January 21, 1993, his nomination was confirmed unanimously and without controversy, along with a slate of Clinton appointees.

In the very early days of the administration, Reich was seen as one of the most powerful members of the Clinton cabinet, for both his friendship with the president and his ambitious agenda for the Department of Labor. Reich envisioned Labor as the nucleus of a cluster of agencies, including the Departments of Commerce and Education, which could act in tandem to break down traditional bureaucratic barriers. Consistent with the 1992 Clinton platform and his writings before taking office, Reich called for more federal spending on jobs training and infrastructure.

Reich also took the initiative to expand his flexible power as an economic advisor-at-large to the president. As a member of the National Economic Council, Reich advised Clinton on health care reform, education policy, welfare reform, national service initiatives, and technology policy in addition to deficit reduction and spending priorities. He also actively engaged independent government agencies, such as the Federal Communications Commission, to take a labor-focused approach to regulation. He referred to himself as "secretary of the American work force" and "the central banker of the nation's greatest resource".

However, Reich clashed with deficit hawks on the administration's economic team, including budget director Leon Panetta and Federal Reserve chair Alan Greenspan, a holdover from the Reagan administration whom Clinton reappointed. Reducing the deficit was the administration's top economic priority, placing Reich's economic agenda on hold. He later credited Hillary Clinton with keeping him apprised of activities within the White House.

During Reich's tenure, he implemented the Family and Medical Leave Act (FMLA) and successfully lobbied to increase the national minimum wage.

=== NAFTA ===
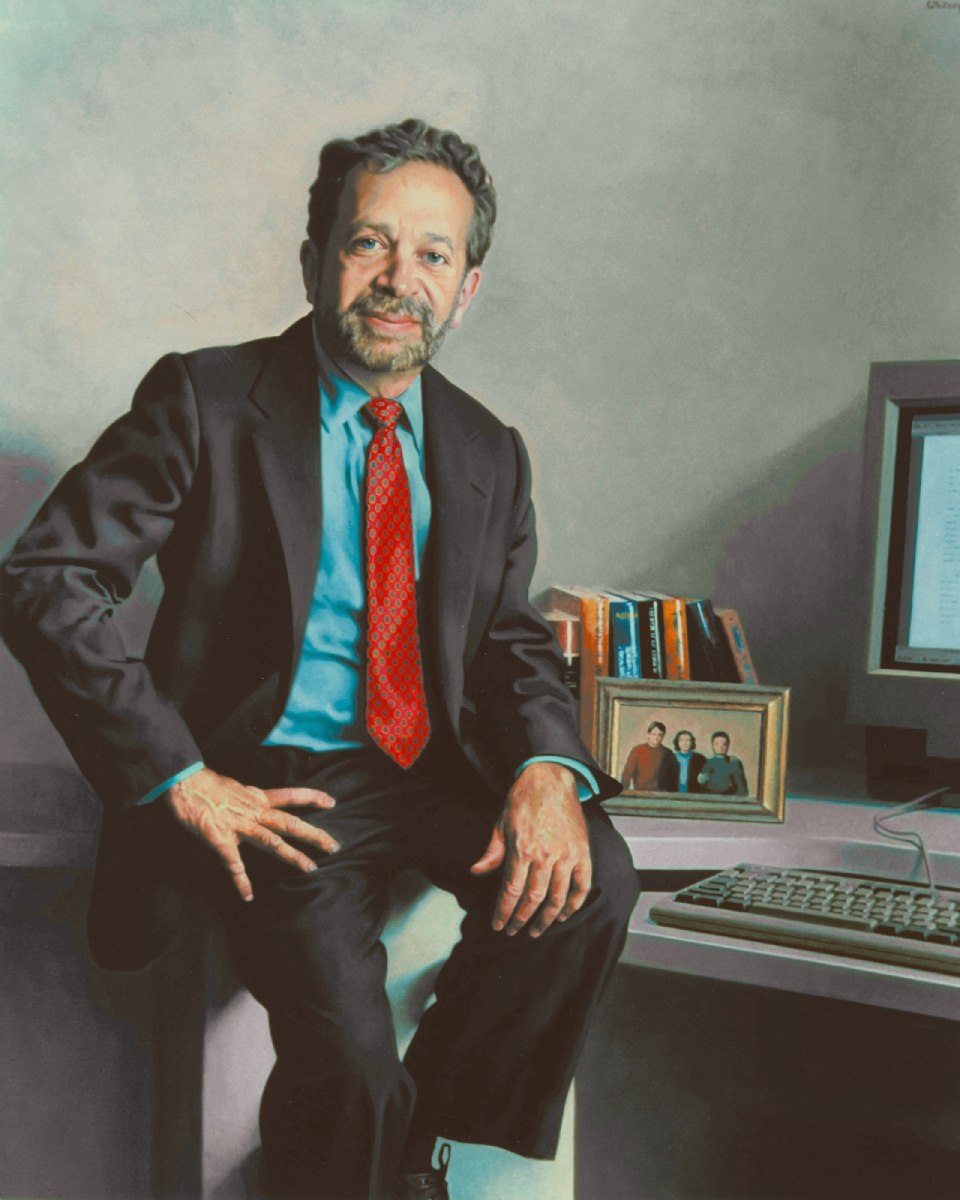
Reich's official Department of Labor portrait, 1994

Throughout his first year in office, Reich was a leading proponent of the North American Free Trade Agreement (NAFTA), which was negotiated by the George H. W. Bush administration and supported by Clinton after two side agreements negotiated to satisfy labor and environmental groups. Reich served as the leading public and private spokesman for the Clinton administration against organized labor, which continued to oppose the agreement as a whole.

In July 1993, Reich said the unions were "just plain wrong" to suggest that NAFTA would cause a loss of American employment; he predicted that "given the pace of growth of the Mexican automobile market over the next 15 years, I would say that more automobile jobs would be created in the United States than would be lost to Mexico... [T]he American automobile industry will grow substantially, and the net effect will be an increase in automobile jobs." He further argued that trade liberalization after World War II had led to the "biggest increase in jobs and standard of living among the industrialized nations [in] history. "

In a September 1993 speech to the Center for National Policy think tank, Reich said, "Great change demands great flexibility--the capacity to adapt quickly and continuously, to change jobs, change directions, gain new skills. But the sad irony is that massive change on the scale we are now facing may be inviting the opposite reaction: a politics of preservation, grounded in fear." Reich specifically said that opposition to NAFTA "has little to do with the agreement and much to do with the pervasive anxieties arising from economic changes that are already affecting Americans." In October, Reich addressed the biannual AFL-CIO convention in San Francisco, where economist Thea Lea of the Economic Policy Institute mocked Reich's view as a "field-of-dreams" theory of job creation. His remarks were generally well received, though only briefly mentioning NAFTA; he focused on the Clinton administration's approach to the National Labor Relations Board, day-to-day business regulation and management-labor relations.

In advance of the final vote, Reich personally lobbied members of Congress to support the agreement. The bill passed the House by a vote of 234–200 on November 17 and the Senate by a vote of 61–38 on November 20; President Clinton signed it into law on December 8.

More than twenty years later, in opposing the Trans-Pacific Partnership as "NAFTA on steroids", Reich repudiated his position. He further admitted that he regretted "not doing more to strengthen [NAFTA]'s labor and environmental side-agreements", though he denied supporting an expedited "fast-track" legislative process without opportunity for amendment.

=== Return to influence (1995–1997) ===
By August 1994, Reich had largely become sidelined on policy by the deficit hawks in the administration. With the approval of the White House, he delivered the first of four major speeches on the emergence of a new "anxious class" of Americans, who were concerned with increased global competition and technological change.

After a disastrous performance by the Democratic Party in the midterm elections in November 1994, Reich returned to the forefront of the Clinton economic team. Clinton reframed his agenda around a set of Reich proposals: middle-class tax cuts, a boost in the minimum wage, tax deductions for college tuition, federal grants to help workers upgrade their skills, and a ban on strike replacements.

In a speech to the Democratic Leadership Council shortly after the election, Reich called for cutting corporate subsidies, which he labeled "corporate welfare", as the only viable way to afford jobs-training programs. In a concession to the new Republican congress, Reich said that many federal job training programs did not work; he also said it was necessary to consolidate programs that work and eliminate those that did not. After the speech, Treasury Secretary Lloyd Bentsen and Commerce Secretary Ron Brown attempted to distance the administration from Reich's corporate welfare comments. However, Bentsen soon resigned, and Reich continued to attack corporate welfare.

In February 1995, Reich met opposition within the administration over his proposal to ban government contractors from permanently replacing striking workers. Clinton sided with Reich, thereby reestablishing his central role in the administration's economic policy.

Reich gave weekly speeches attacking the new Republican majority, with his central message being the need to adapt to an information-based economy and the continued need for job retraining. He said, "We can't get the mass production economy back. The challenge now is of a different kind, and many have found it difficult to adapt. This is a major social transformation." During a Chicago call-in radio show, he said, "You are on a downward escalator. You have a lot of job insecurity because of the tidal wave of corporate downsizing and restructuring."

In December 1995, Reich delivered a commencement speech at the University of Maryland, College Park, in which he decried the increasing tendency of wealthy, educated Americans to divide themselves from the general population as "the secession of the successful America".

=== Resignation and memoir ===
In 1996, between Clinton's reelection and second inauguration, Reich decided to leave the Department of Labor to spend more time with his sons, then in their teen years.

By April 1997, Reich had published his experiences in the Clinton administration in his book Locked in the Cabinet. Among those he criticized in the memoir were Clinton advisor Dick Morris, former AFL-CIO head Lane Kirkland, and Federal Reserve Board chairman Alan Greenspan, a leading deficit hawk whom Reich considered "the most powerful man in the world." In the book, Reich criticizes the Democratic Party as being "owned by" business. He also criticizes Washington as having two real political parties during his tenure: the "Save the Jobs" party, which wanted to maintain the status quo, and the "Let 'Em Drown" party.

After publication of the book, Reich received criticism for embellishing events with invented dialogue that did not match C-SPAN tapes or official transcripts of meetings. The paperback release of the memoir revised or omitted the inventions. In one story, members of the National Association of Manufacturers (NAM) confronted Reich with curses and shouts of "Go back to Harvard!" In the revised version of the NAM story, Reich is instead hissed at. The foreword to the paperback edition contained an explanation, in which Reich says that "memory is fallible".

The memoir has since been called "a classic of the pissed-off-secretary genre" by Glenn Thrush.

== After the Clinton administration ==
Reich became a professor at Brandeis University in 1997, teaching courses for undergraduates as well as in the Heller School for Social Policy and Management. In 2003, he was elected Professor of the Year by the undergraduate student body.

On January 1, 2006, Reich joined the faculty of UC Berkeley's Goldman School of Public Policy. Until his retirement in 2023, he taught a popular undergraduate course called Wealth and Poverty, in addition to his graduate courses. Reich is also a member of the board of trustees for the Blum Center for Developing Economies at the University of California, Berkeley. The center is focused on finding solutions to address the crisis of extreme poverty and disease in the developing world. In February 2017, Reich criticized UC Berkeley's decision to host Milo Yiannopoulos, a supporter of Donald Trump. Following protests on the Berkeley Campus, Reich stated that although he didn't "want to add to the conspiratorial musings" he wouldn't rule out the possibility the "agitators" represented a right-wing "false flag" for Trump to strip universities of federal funding.

=== 2002 campaign for Governor of Massachusetts ===
In 2002, Reich ran for the office of Governor of Massachusetts, losing in the Democratic primary to Shannon O'Brien. He also published an associated campaign book, I'll Be Short. Reich was the first US gubernatorial candidate to support same-sex marriage. He also pledged support for abortion rights and strongly condemned capital punishment. His campaign staff was largely composed of his Brandeis students. Although his campaign had little funding, he narrowly finished in second place out of six candidates in the Democratic primary, gaining 25% of the vote; O'Brien later lost the general election to future Republican presidential nominee Mitt Romney.

In early 2005, there was speculation that Reich would again seek the Democratic nomination for Governor of Massachusetts. Instead, he endorsed the then-little-known candidacy of Deval Patrick, who had previously served as Assistant Attorney General for the Civil Rights Division in the Clinton administration. Patrick won the party's endorsement, followed by a three-way primary in which he secured nearly 50% of the vote, and ultimately won the general election in November 2006.

=== Political commentary ===
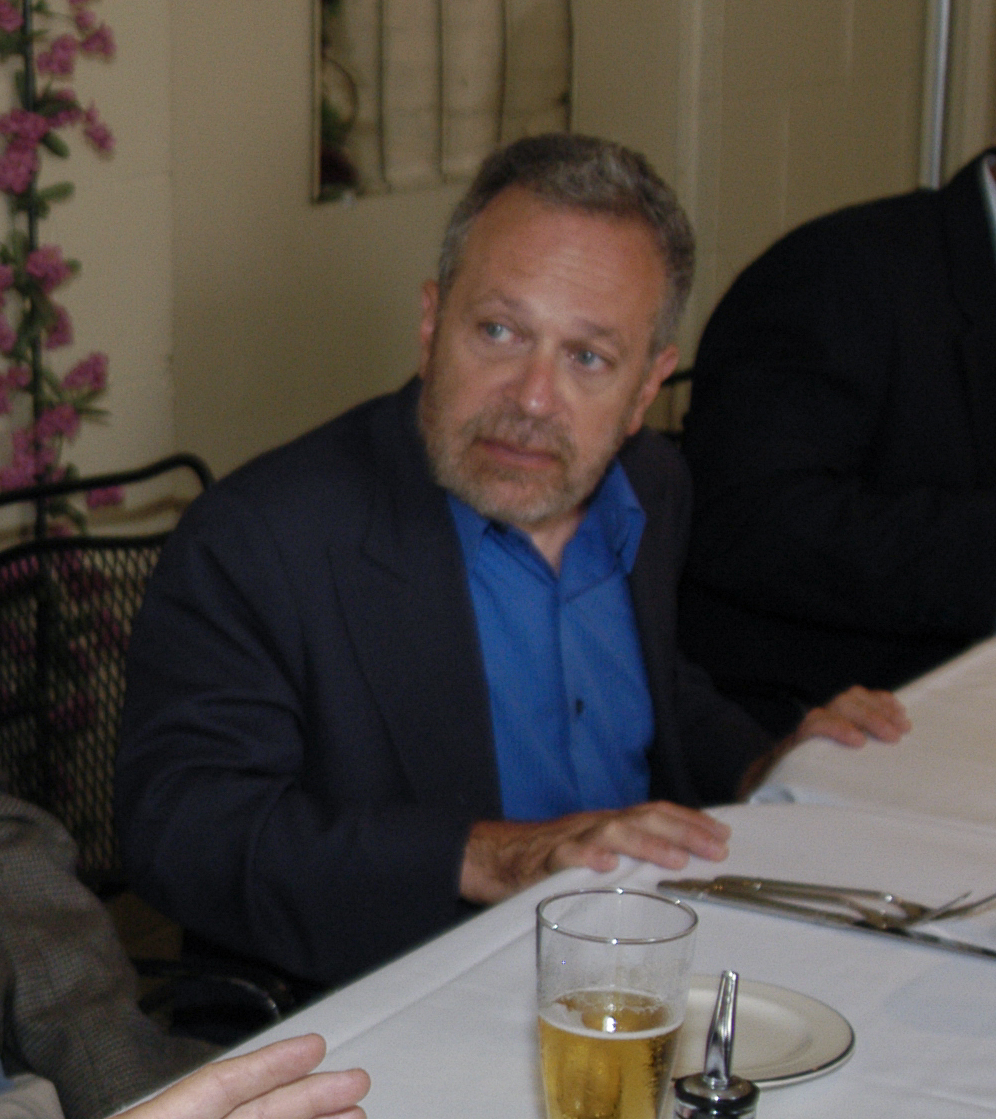
Reich in 2004

In 2004, Reich published the book Reason: Why Liberals Will Win the Battle for America.

In addition to his professorial role, he was a weekly contributor to the American Public Media public radio program Marketplace, and a regular columnist for The American Prospect magazine, which he co-founded in 1990. He has also frequently contributed to CNBC's programs Kudlow & Company and On the Money.

In 2010, Reich's weekly column was syndicated by the Tribune Content Agency. Since the summer of 2016, he has contributed an opinion column to Newsweek magazine.

In 2013, he partnered with filmmaker Jacob Kornbluth to produce the documentary Inequality for All, based on Reich's book Aftershock, which won a Special Jury Award at the Sundance Film Festival. In 2017, he again partnered with Jacob Kornbluth to produce the documentary Saving Capitalism, based on Reich's book of that name. Netflix selected the film to be a Netflix Original Documentary. In the documentary, Reich posits that in the late 1960s, large corporations began to use financial power to purchase influence among the political class and to consolidate political power; he highlights the influence of the 2010 Citizens United ruling, which allowed corporations to contribute to election campaigns. In the documentary, he advocates for grassroots political mobilization among working-class Americans to counteract the political power of corporate America.

In 2022, Reich was featured in The Simpsons season finale "Poorhouse Rock", where he briefly explains the economic decline of the American middle class during a musical sequence.

Since 2021, Reich has authored a Substack newsletter, Robert Reich, where he provides daily commentary on economic and political issues. The publication has attracted more than one million subscribers.

In 2023, filmmakers Elliot Kirschner and Heather Kinlaw Lofthouse filmed Reich's "Wealth and Poverty" lecture course and interviewed Reich about his career. The resulting documentary, The Last Class, was released in 2025.

== Political stances ==
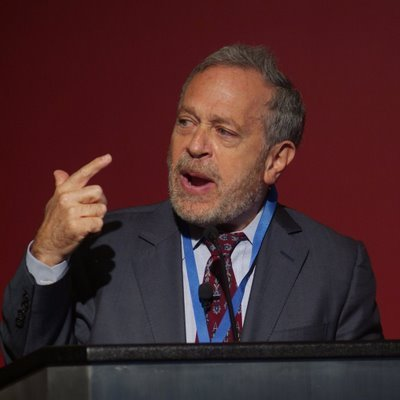
Reich speaking in 2009

In an interview with The New York Times in 2008, Reich explained that "I don't believe in redistribution of wealth for the sake of redistributing wealth. But I am concerned about how we can afford to pay for what we as a nation need to do . . . [Taxes should pay] for what we need in order to be safe and productive. As Oliver Wendell Holmes once wrote, 'taxes are the price we pay for a civilized society.'"

In response to a question on what to recommend to the incoming president about a fair and sustainable distribution of income and wealth, Reich advised the following: "Expand the Earned Income Tax Credit—a wage supplement for lower-income people, and finance it with a higher marginal income tax on the top five percent. For the longer term, invest in education for lower income communities, starting with early-childhood education and extending all the way up to better access to post-secondary education."

Reich is pro-union, saying that "unionization is not just good for workers in unions, unionization is very, very important for the economy overall, and would create broad benefits for the United States." Writing in 2014, he stated that he favors raising the federal minimum wage to $15 per hour over three years, believing that it will not adversely impact big business and will increase the availability of higher-value workers.

Reich also supports an unconditional and universal basic income. On the eve of a referendum in Switzerland on basic income in June 2016, he declared that countries will eventually need to introduce this financial instrument.

While affordable housing has been a central issue in Reich's activism, in July 2020, Reich opposed a high-density development project in his own neighborhood in Berkeley. He supported making a 120-year-old triplex a landmark to prevent the construction of a ten-apartment building, one of which would be deed restricted for rental to a low income tenant, citing "the character of the neighborhood". During an interview with W. Kamau Bell the following month, Reich reaffirmed his support for affordable housing "in every community I've been involved in", and critiqued the development for replacing the house with "condos selling for one and a half million dollars each".

Although a supporter of Israel, Reich has criticized Israel's settlement building in the occupied Palestinian territories. In 2024, Reich spoke out against the "bloodbath" in Gaza, and declared "we must restrict U.S. arms sales to Israel."

In September 2005, Reich testified against John Roberts at his confirmation hearings for Chief Justice of the United States.

On April 18, 2008, Reich endorsed Barack Obama for president of the United States. During the 2008 primaries, Reich published an article that was critical of the Clintons, referring to Bill Clinton's attacks on Barack Obama as "ill-tempered and ill-founded," and accusing the Clintons of waging "a smear campaign against Obama that employs some of the worst aspects of the old politics."

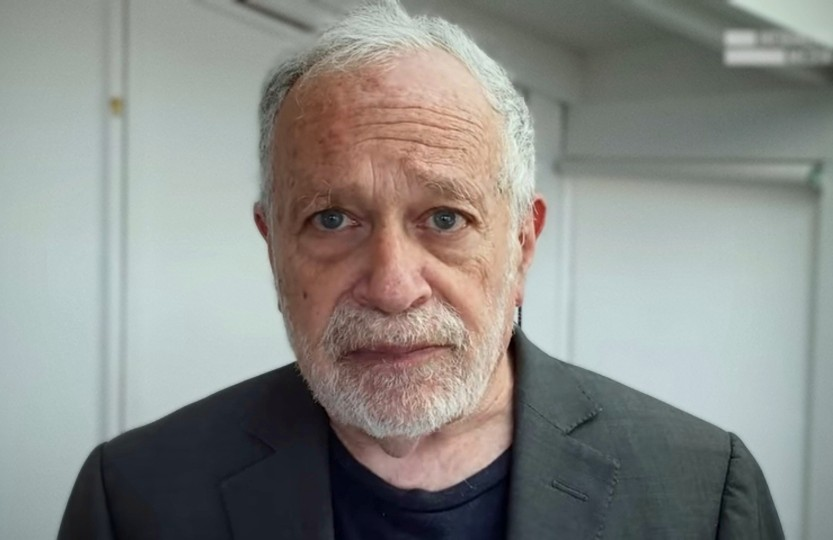
Reich in 2021

Reich endorsed Bernie Sanders for president of the United States in 2016, and both Sanders and Elizabeth Warren in 2020. After Sanders ended his 2016 campaign, Reich urged Sanders's supporters to back the eventual Democratic nominee, Hillary Clinton.

On May 31, 2020, Reich declared that "by having no constructive response to any of the monumental crises now convulsing America, Trump has abdicated his office." Since at least 2021, Reich has publicly supported President Donald Trump's removal from Twitter and other social media platforms. In an April 2022 op-ed published in The Guardian, Reich criticized Elon Musk's efforts to take over Twitter, opining that the "libertarian vision of an 'uncontrolled' internet" is "dangerous rubbish."

In 2022, Reich called Florida governor Ron DeSantis a "fascist."

In October 2023, Reich wrote "The last adult in the room". In the essay, he characterized Joe Biden as, "shrewd, careful, and calibrated" and expressed gratitude that Biden "is in charge" at a time "when the kids are on a rampage".

In 2025, Reich endorsed New York State Assembly member Zohran Mamdani in the 2025 New York City Democratic mayoral primary.

In 2025, Reich also endorsed Sullivan Harbor Master Graham Platner in the Democratic primary for the 2026 United States Senate election in Maine, and Independent Dan Osborn in the 2026 United States Senate election in Nebraska.

== Social media ==
What's the Fed? Reich explaining the Federal Reserve (2015)

In 2015, with Jacob Kornbluth, Reich founded Inequality Media, which produces video content of Reich. This content includes a "Resistance Report" (a fifteen- to thirty-minute video published on social media), and the weekly YouTube show The Common Good.

== Personal life ==
Reich married British-born lawyer Clare Dalton in Cambridge, England, in 1973; they divorced in 2012. During their marriage, the couple had two sons: Sam, CEO and owner of Dropout (previously known as CollegeHumor), and Adam, a sociology professor at Columbia University. Reich subsequently married photographer Perian Flaherty.

Reich was born with multiple epiphyseal dysplasia (Fairbank's disease), a rare genetic disorder that affects bone growth and results in short stature. He stands 4 feet 11 inches tall, an issue he publicly addressed in a July 2023 blog post titled "Why I'm So Short."

In 2020, Reich wrote a letter to the City of Berkeley Landmarks Preservation Commission objecting to the construction of ten housing units (including one low-income unit) on a lot near Reich's home. The landmark designation, which Reich called for, was denied in August 2020 and January 2021. (Note: Sources from 2020-2021 report the decision of destroying the Payton House (1915 Berryman Street), but Google Street View (July 2024) shows the house is still there."1915 Berryman St. Berkeley, California. Google Street View" (Map). Google Maps.)

In 2023, Reich appeared in a cameo role in "Dropout America 2", the first episode of the sixth season of Dropout's Breaking News program, providing a fictional account of his son Sam's life. He made another cameo appearance in 2025 in the season 7 finale of the game show Game Changer, titled "Outvoted," wherein contestants were made to compete in a mock presidential debate. Reich endorsed comedian and contestant Demi Adejuyigbe after he was bribed $3.

In 2025, Reich published Coming Up Short: A Memoir of My America. Jennifer Szalai, reviewing it for The New York Times, remarked how bullying is an important subject in the book as Reich experienced it through his childhood, adding: "Reich comes across as thoughtful, genial and principled; he notes on the copyright page that portions of 'Coming Up Short' appeared in a couple of earlier books, but the bit of recycling arguably reflects how steadfastly he has held onto his values. Unlike the economists Larry Summers and Robert Rubin, who also served in the Clinton administration, Reich has been remarkably prescient, regularly warning about the dangers of inequality and the perils posed by a financial industry run amok. Reich, who is 4-foot-11 (and prone to puns, as evinced by previous books like 'Locked in the Cabinet' and 'I’ll Be Short'), has long promoted civil society and government institutions as essential antidotes to a Hobbesian war of all-against-all: 'I would not survive a minute in a society based on brute force.'" As of September 1, 2025, it was ranked 7th among non-fiction books on The New York Times Best Seller list.

== Awards ==
- Bruno-Kreisky Award, best political book of year (Supercapitalism), 2009
- Václav Havel Foundation VIZE 97 Prize, October 2003, for his writings in economics and politics.
- Louis Brownlow Award (best book on public administration), National Academy of Public Administration, 1984

== Written works ==
=== Books ===
- 1982: Minding America's Business: The Decline and Rise of the American Economy (with Ira Magaziner), ISBN 0-394-71538-1
- 1983: The Next American Frontier, ISBN 0-8129-1067-2
- 1985: New Deals: The Chrysler Revival and the American System (with writer John Donahue), ISBN 0-14-008983-7
- 1987: Tales of a New America: The Anxious Liberal's Guide to the Future, ISBN 0-394-75706-8
- 1989: The Resurgent Liberal: And Other Unfashionable Prophecies, ISBN 0-8129-1833-9
- 1990: The Power of Public Ideas (editor), ISBN 0-674-69590-9
- 1990: Public Management in a Democratic Society, ISBN 0-13-738881-0
- 1991: The Work of Nations: Preparing Ourselves for 21st Century Capitalism, ISBN 0-679-73615-8
- 1997: Locked in the Cabinet, ISBN 0-375-70061-7
- 2000: The Future of Success: Working and Living in the New Economy, ISBN 0-375-72512-1
- 2002: I'll Be Short: Essentials for a Decent Working Society, ISBN 0-8070-4340-0
- 2004: Reason: Why Liberals Will Win the Battle for America, ISBN 1-4000-7660-9
- 2007: Supercapitalism: The Transformation of Business, Democracy, and Everyday Life, ISBN 0-307-26561-7
- 2010: Aftershock: The Next Economy and America's Future, ISBN 978-0-307-59281-1 (updated edition 2013)
- 2012: Beyond Outrage: What Has Gone Wrong with Our Economy and Our Democracy, and How to Fix It, ISBN 978-0345804372
- 2015: Saving Capitalism: For the Many, Not the Few, ISBN 978-0385350570
- 2017: Economics in Wonderland, ISBN 978-1683960607
- 2018: The Common Good, ISBN 978-0525520498
- 2020: The System: Who Rigged It, How We Fix It, ISBN 9780525659044
- 2025: Coming Up Short: A Memoir of My America, ISBN 978-0593803288

=== Plays ===
- Milton and Augusto (reading, University of California Berkeley, Center for Latin American Studies, September 2013)
- Public Exposure (East Coast premier, Wellfleet Harbor Actor's Theater, June 2005; West Coast premier, Santa Rosa Theater, June 2008)

== Filmography ==
These documentaries, and additional social media movies, have been made in collaboration with Jacob Kornbluth.

- 2013: Inequality for All
- 2017: Saving Capitalism
- 2025: The Last Class
- 2026: The Work in Progress

== See also ==
- 2008–09 Keynesian resurgence
- Journal of Women, Politics & Policy – Reich sits on the editorial board
- The Trap (TV series), BBC documentary featuring Reich
- List of Jewish United States Cabinet members

== Notes ==
Political offices
Preceded by Lynn Morley Martin	United States Secretary of Labor; 1993–1997	Succeeded by Alexis Herman
U.S. order of precedence (ceremonial)
Preceded by Barbara Franklin as Former U.S. Cabinet Member	Order of precedence of the United States as Former U.S. Cabinet Member	Succeeded by Federico Peña as Former U.S. Cabinet Member
