= Reason: Why Liberals Will Win the Battle for America =

Book by Robert Reich

- The front (first) page of the first edition
- Author: Robert Reich
- Language: English
- Subject: US Politics
- Publisher: Alfred A. Knopf
- Publication date: 2004
- Publication place: United States
- Pages: 272 (paperback edition)
- ISBN: 1400076609
- LC Class: JC574.2.U6 R45 2004

Reason: Why Liberals Will Win the Battle for America is a book written by Robert Reich, who is the former Secretary of Labor in the Bill Clinton administration.

== Reviews ==
- REASON: Why Liberals Will Win the Battle for America, by Robert Reich
- BOOKS OF THE TIMES; What's Right and What's Left To Say on the Political Divide, by Edward L. Widmer and Ted Widmer
- Reason: Why Liberals Will Win the Battle for America (Lecture and Q&A with Reich discussing his book)
