= Afternoon Delight (film) =

2013 film by Joey Soloway

- Theatrical release poster
- Directed by: Joey Soloway (Note: Credited as Jill Solloway; Afternoon Delight was released before Soloway came out as non-binary and began using the name "Joey".)
- Written by: Joey Soloway
- Produced by: Jen Chaiken; Sebastian Dungan
- Starring: Kathryn Hahn; Juno Temple; Josh Radnor; Jane Lynch
- Cinematography: Jim Frohna
- Edited by: Catherine Haight
- Music by: Craig Wedren
- Production companies: 72 Productions; Rincon Entertainment
- Distributed by: The Film Arcade
- Release dates: January 21, 2013 (Sundance); August 30, 2013 (United States; limited)
- Running time: 97 minutes
- Country: United States
- Language: English
- Box office: $174,496

Afternoon Delight is a 2013 American comedy-drama film written and directed by Joey Soloway. It stars Kathryn Hahn, Juno Temple, Josh Radnor, and Jane Lynch. The film premiered at the 2013 Sundance Film Festival, where it was awarded the U.S. Dramatic Directing Award. It was given a limited theatrical release in the United States on August 30, 2013.

== Plot ==
Rachel is a stay-at-home mom frustrated at not having had sex with her husband Jeff for months. She visits her therapist, Lenore, but finds no help in her advice.

Looking to spice up their relationship, Rachel and Jeff visit a strip club, where they meet McKenna. Jeff buys Rachel a private lap dance during which she learns that McKenna is only 19. Rachel and Jeff continue not having sex. The film does not reveal why.

Rachel drives around the neighborhood of the strip club, hoping to see McKenna. She spots her at an espresso hut where she introduces herself. They begin talking and having coffee together regularly, they soon become friends. One day Rachel comes across McKenna having been thrown out of her residence, so she invites her to stay at their large house. While Jeff is less than happy, Rachel learns McKenna is a prostitute who has regular clients, and decides to help McKenna escape from that lifestyle.

Rachel starts teaching McKenna how to nanny her young son Logan. When Rachel is frustrated at a school event, she asks McKenna if she can go with her to see her client, Jack. While there, she watches the two of them have sex, and is horrified by what she sees.

When asked by a friend if McKenna can babysit, Rachel changes her mind and says she doesn't want her to. McKenna is upset by this, as she went through a lot of effort buying things for the girls' party. While the women are out, and all the men are at Jeff and Rachel's house, McKenna comes in and starts acting provocatively. She ends up sleeping with one of Jeff's friends, but his wife and Rachel walk in on them. McKenna is thrown out of their house.

Rachel tells Jeff that she wants out of this life, and out of her head, which he takes to mean he should leave. At a visit to Lenore, Rachel comforts Lenore when she starts crying and telling her how her partner had left, saying "I don't want to start all over again." That night, Rachel goes to Jeff (he is staying in the garage of one of his friends) and they reconcile, being happier than ever.

One day while driving, Rachel sees McKenna on the street, and starts to stop but changes her mind. She tells her friend that she had nothing to say to her.

Rachel and Jeff are happy together again. The film ends with Rachel and Jeff having passionate sex while Rachel moans with orgasm.

== Cast ==
- Kathryn Hahn as Rachel
- Juno Temple as McKenna
- Josh Radnor as Jeff
- Jane Lynch as Lenore
- Jessica St. Clair as Stephanie
- Michaela Watkins as Jennie
- Josh Stamberg as Matt
- John Kapelos as Jack
- Keegan-Michael Key as Bo
- Annie Mumolo as Amanda

== Release ==
The film premiered at the 2013 Sundance Film Festival. The film was given a limited release on August 30, 2013.

== Reception ==
On review aggregator website Rotten Tomatoes, Afternoon Delight has a 67% approval rating based on 81 reviews, with an average rating of 6.17/10. The film's critics consensus reads: "Afternoon Delight's uncertain tone is entertainingly offset by smart dialogue and standout starring work from Kathryn Hahn." On Metacritic, based on 21 critics, the film has a 48/100 rating, signifying "mixed or average" reviews. Christy Lemire gave the film two stars.

Soloway received the Directing Award for Drama at the 2013 Sundance Film Festival on January 26, 2013.

Filmmaker Quentin Tarantino included Afternoon Delight on his list of the Top Ten Films of 2013.

=== Accolades ===
Award / Film Festival	Date of ceremony	Category	Recipient(s)	Result	Ref.
Sundance Film Festival	January 26, 2013	Grand Jury Prize	Afternoon Delight	Nominated	
Sundance Film Festival	January 26, 2013	Directing Award	Joey Soloway	Won	
Gotham Independent Film Awards	December 2, 2013	Breakthrough Actor	Kathryn Hahn	Nominated	
Independent Spirit Awards	March 1, 2014	Best First Screenplay	Joey Soloway	Nominated	
