= Positively Naked =

2006 documentary film about people with HIV/AIDS

Positively Naked is a 2006 documentary film for Cinemax about people living with HIV/AIDS.
