= High Falls Film Festival =

Film festival in Rochester, NY (founded 2001)

The High Falls Film Festival, founded in 2001, is a film festival that focuses on celebrating women in film. The festival is inspired by Rochester, New York's legacy in nitrate film and the women’s rights movement.

High Falls Film Festival presents multiple features, documentaries, and shorts, including a children's program and student-filmmaker program. The festival includes emerging and established female talent, with past guests including actresses Kerry Washington, Christine Lahti, Angela Bassett, Jane Alexander, Candice Bergen, Joan Allen, Famke Janssen, and CCH Pounder, and voice-over actress Nancy Cartwright. The festival is held in Rochester's East End entertainment district.

The festival aligned with the Rochester International Film Festival in 2007 and with George Eastman House in 2009 under the name George Eastman House 360 | 365 Film Festival. The festival took a hiatus in 2012 and returned in 2013. In 2021, the organization changed format from an annual event to a monthly series at Rochester's Little Theatre.

== Awards ==
The Susan B. Anthony "Failure is Impossible" Award
Honors a woman in the film industry who has persevered in her career and triumphed over difficulties.

- 2001: Pam Grier, actress
- 2002: Lainie Kazan, actress
- 2003: Candice Bergen, actress
- 2004: Sally Kellerman, actress
- 2005: Angela Bassett, actress
- 2006: Agnieszka Holland, director
- 2008: Rita Moreno, actress
- 2009: Lynn Redgrave and C.C.H. Pounder, actresses
- 2010: Thelma Schoonmaker, editor
- 2011: Julie Taymor, filmmaker
- 2017: Nancy Schreiber, cinematographer

The Golden Lens Award for Cinematography
Honors a person who has made creative contributions of outstanding artistic significance to the field of cinematography.

- 2011: Buddy Squires

The Rochester Film Legacy Award
Honors a filmmaker or film supporter based in the Rochester area whose passion and dedication embodies Rochester’s proud film legacy.

- 2011: Brock Yates
- 2015: Marilyn O'Connor
- 2016: June Foster

The Faith Hubley "Web of Life" Award
Named after its first recipient, honors a woman who understands the power of art in connecting with an audience and in making the world a better place.

- 2001: Faith Hubley, animator
- 2002: Nancy Cartwright, voice actor
- 2003: Jeannie Epper, stuntwoman
- 2004: Mira Nair, filmmaker
- 2005: Jane Alexander, actor

The Elizabeth Cady Stanton "Thorn in the Side" Award
Honors women who exemplify the collaborative nature of film and video. The award is named in honor of Stanton, who said: "If there is one part of my life which gives me more intense satisfaction than another, it is my friendship with Susan B. Anthony... we have indeed been thorns in the side of each other..."

- 2006: Stella Pence, (retired) Co-Director, Telluride Film Festival
- 2008: Estela Bravo, director
- 2009: Debra Zimmerman

Audience Choice Awardees
Festival audiences chose Best Feature, Best Documentary and Best Short. Past Audience Award winners include:

2001
- Best Feature: No Man's Land
  - Runner-Up: Fast Runner
- Best Documentary: Southern Comfort
  - Runner-Up: Endurance

2002
- Best Feature: Nowhere In Africa
  - Runner-Up: Frida
- Best Documentary: Blue Vinyl
  - Runner-Up: Sister Helen

2003
- Best Feature: In America
- Best Documentary: My Architect

2004
- Best Feature: Dear Frankie
- Best Documentary: Born Into Brothels

2005
- Best Feature: The World's Fastest Indian
- Best Documentary: Christa Mcauliffe: Reach For The Stars
- Best Short: A Life To Live

2006
- Best Feature: The Lives Of Others
- Best Documentary: American Blackout
- Best Short: Sintonia

2008
- Best Feature: Phoebe in Wonderland
- Best Documentary: Autism: The Musical

2009
- Best Feature: Skin
- Best Documentary: Signs Of The Time
- Best Short: Julie, Julie

2010
- Best Feature: Welcome
- Best Documentary: Waiting For "Superman"

2011
- Best Feature: The First Grader

2016
- Best Feature: Sugar!
- Best Documentary: My Love Affair With The Brain: The Life and Science of Dr. Marian Diamond 2015
- Best Feature: The Lennon Report
- Best Documentary: Yemeniettes 2011
- Best Documentary: Bill Cunningham New York
- Best Short: Shoegazer

== See also ==
- List of women's film festivals
