= 21st Independent Spirit Awards =

US film awards ceremony in 2006

- Date: March 4, 2006
- Site: U.S.
- Hosted by: Sarah Silverman

Highlights
- Best Film: Brokeback Mountain
- Most awards: Brokeback Mountain (2); Capote (2); Transamerica (2)
- Most nominations: The Squid and the Whale (6)

The 21st Independent Spirit Awards, honoring the best in independent filmmaking for 2005, were announced on March 4, 2006. It was hosted by Sarah Silverman.

== Winners and nominees ==
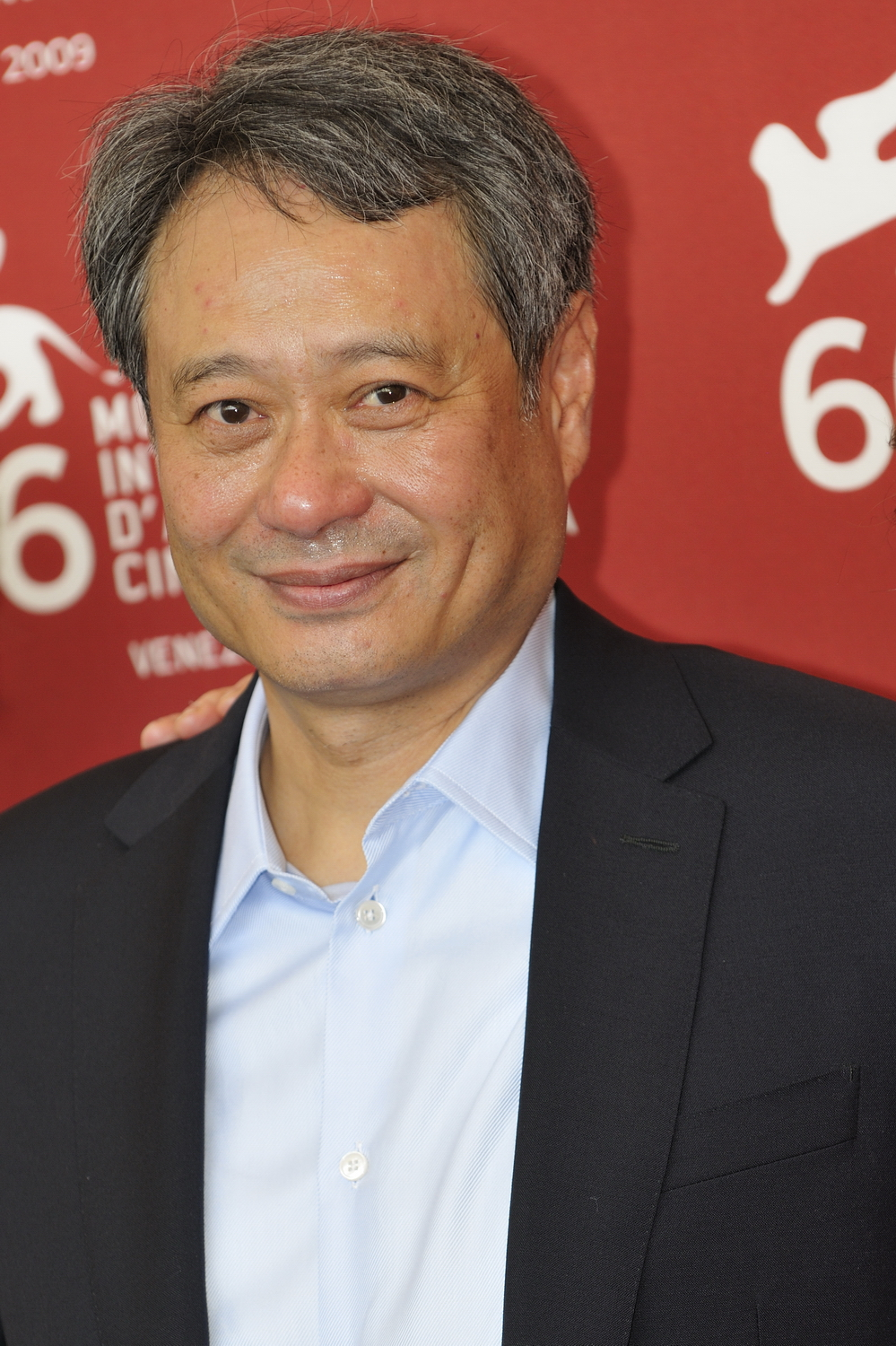
Ang Lee, Best Director winner

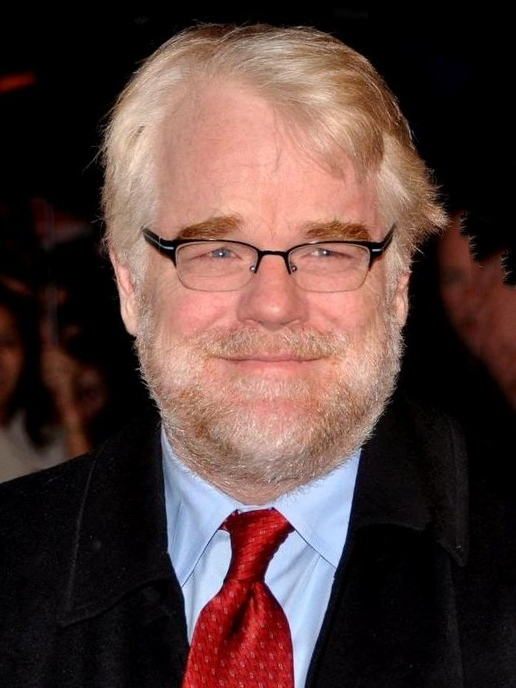
Philip Seymour Hoffman, Best Male Lead winner

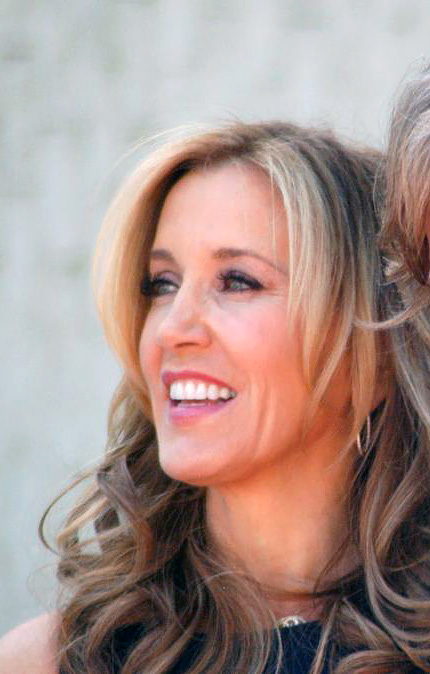
Felicity Huffman, Best Female Lead winner

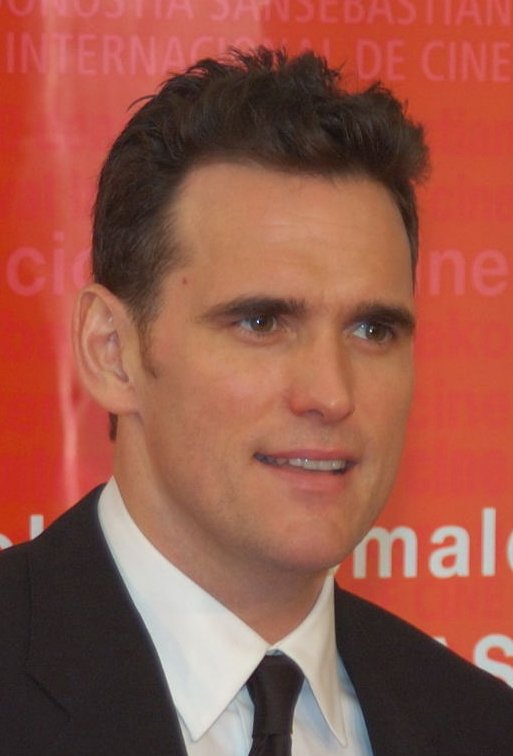
Matt Dillon, Best Supporting Male winner

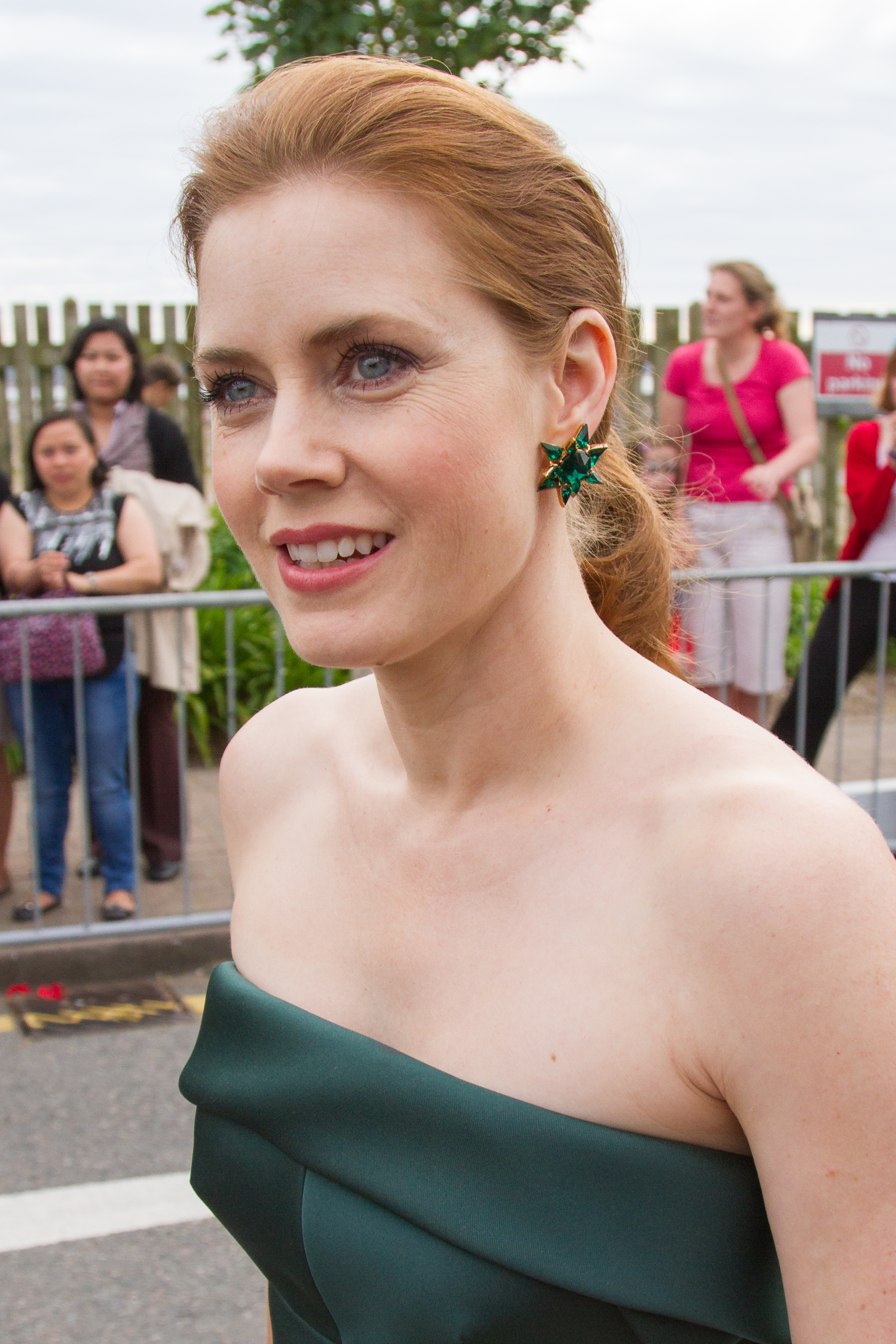
Amy Adams, Best Supporting Female winner

Best Feature	Best Director
Brokeback Mountain: Capote; Good Night, and Good Luck.; The Squid and the Whale; The Three Burials of Melquiades Estrada	Ang Lee – Brokeback Mountain: Gregg Araki – Mysterious Skin; Noah Baumbach – The Squid and the Whale; George Clooney – Good Night, and Good Luck.; Rodrigo García – Nine Lives
Best Male Lead	Best Female Lead
Philip Seymour Hoffman – Capote: Jeff Daniels – The Squid and the Whale; Terrence Howard – Hustle & Flow; Heath Ledger – Brokeback Mountain; David Strathairn – Good Night, and Good Luck.	Felicity Huffman – Transamerica: Dina Korzun – Forty Shades of Blue; Laura Linney – The Squid and the Whale; S. Epatha Merkerson – Lackawanna Blues; Cyndi Williams – Room
Best Supporting Male	Best Supporting Female
Matt Dillon – Crash: Firdous Bamji – The War Within; Jesse Eisenberg – The Squid and the Whale; Barry Pepper – The Three Burials of Melquiades Estrada; Jeffrey Wright – Broken Flowers	Amy Adams – Junebug: Maggie Gyllenhaal – Happy Endings; Allison Janney – Our Very Own; Michelle Williams – Brokeback Mountain; Robin Wright Penn – Nine Lives
Best Screenplay	Best First Screenplay
Capote – Dan Futterman: Nine Lives – Rodrigo García; The Squid and the Whale – Noah Baumbach; The Three Burials of Melquiades Estrada – Guillermo Arriaga; The War Within – Ayad Akhtar, Joseph Castelo and Tom Glynn	Transamerica – Duncan Tucker: The Beautiful Country – Sabina Murray; Fixing Frank – Ken Hanes; Junebug – Angus MacLachlan; Me and You and Everyone We Know – Miranda July
Best First Feature	Best Documentary
Crash: Lackawanna Blues; Me and You and Everyone We Know; Thumbsucker; Transamerica	Enron: The Smartest Guys in the Room: Grizzly Man; Romántico; La Sierra; Sir! No Sir!
Best Cinematography	Best Foreign Film
Good Night, and Good Luck. – Robert Elswit: Capote – Adam Kimmel; Keane – John Foster; Last Days – Harris Savides; The Three Burials of Melquiades Estrada – Chris Menges	Paradise Now • Palestine/Netherlands/Germany/France: The Death of Mr. Lazarescu • Romania; Duck Season • Germany/Turkey; Head-On • France; Tony Takitani • Japan

=== Films with multiple nominations and awards ===
Films that received multiple nominations
Nominations	Film
6	The Squid and the Whale
4	Brokeback Mountain
4	The Three Burials of Melquiades Estrada
4	Capote
3	Good Night, and Good Luck.
3	Nine Lives
3	Transamerica
2	Crash
2	Junebug
2	Lackawanna Blues
2	Me and You and Everyone We Know
2	The War Within

Films that won multiple awards
Awards	Film
2	Brokeback Mountain
2	Capote
2	Crash
2	Transamerica

== Special awards ==
=== John Cassavetes Award ===
Conventioneers

- Brick
- Jellysmoke
- The Puffy Chair
- Room

=== Truer Than Fiction Award ===
Occupation: Dreamland

- Our Brand Is Crisis
- Romántico
- Twelve Disciples of Nelson Mandela

=== Producers Award ===
Caroline Baron – Capote and Monsoon Wedding

- Ram Bergman – Brick and Conversations with Other Women
- Mike S. Ryan – Junebug and Palindromes

=== Someone to Watch Award ===
Ian Gamazon and Neill Dela Llana – Cavite

- Robinson Devor – Police Beat
- Jay Duplass – The Puffy Chair
