= Jason Kliot =

American film producer

- Born: 1963 (age 62–63); United States
- Education: Amherst College, Ecole Normale Supérieure
- Occupation: Filmmaker
- Spouse: Joana Vicente

Jason Kliot (born 1963) is an American independent film producer and director. He received an Academy Award nomination for producing Enron: The Smartest Guys in the Room (2005) and has produced more than 40 narrative and documentary feature films associated with American independent cinema. He was an early proponent of digital filmmaking, co-founding Blow Up Pictures and later HDNet Films, which contributed to the industry’s transition toward digital production and distribution.

== Career ==
Kliot has produced films directed by Jim Jarmusch, Brian De Palma, Steven Soderbergh, Nadine Labaki, Miguel Arteta, Hal Hartley, Nicole Holofcener, Alex Gibney, Amir Naderi, and Todd Solondz. Films he has produced have been selected for major festivals including the Sundance Film Festival, the Berlin International Film Festival, the Cannes Film Festival, the Toronto International Film Festival, Telluride Film Festival, and the Venice International Film Festival.

His productions have received numerous honors, including two Sundance Grand Jury Prizes, the Silver Lion for Best Director at the Venice Film Festival, and the Prix du Jury at the Cannes Film Festival. His films have earned more than 25 Independent Spirit Award nominations. Two of his productions reached the top ten at the U.S. box office, one opening at number one.

Kliot was nominated for the Academy Award for Best Documentary Feature for Enron: The Smartest Guys in the Room. He also executive produced Capernaum (2018), directed by Nadine Labaki, which won the Prix du Jury at Cannes and received Academy Award and Golden Globe nominations for Best Foreign Language Film.

=== Digital Film Revolution ===
Kliot played an early role in the adoption of digital production within American independent cinema. In 1998, he co-founded Blow Up Pictures with Joana Vicente, which has been cited as the first digital production company in the United States. The company focused on producing low-budget feature films shot on digital video at a time when the format had not yet been widely adopted in the industry.

In 2003, he co-founded HDNet Films with Mark Cuban, Todd Wagner, and Vicente. HDNet Films produced a slate of digitally shot features and participated in a broader industry shift toward digital production and distribution models during the early 2000s. The HDNet Films production of Steven Soderbergh’s Bubble (2005) was released simultaneously in theaters and on cable television, an approach widely cited as an early example of a day-and-date release strategy in the United States.

=== Interactive and Cross-Platform ===
In addition to film production, Kliot has worked in interactive and cross-platform media. He conceived of, developed and designed an interactive video publishing platform that he sold to HBO in 2012, and has consulted on digital media strategy and platform development for organizations including Hearst Corporation, Time Inc., Condé Nast, and The Wall Street Journal.

=== Directing ===
Kliot has directed documentary and short-form work, including feature-length and episodic projects. In 2024, he directed and executive produced the four-part PBS documentary series The Invisible Shield, a RadicalMedia and Bloomberg Philanthropies production that examines the political, social, and historical foundations of public health systems in the United States.

He has also served as executive producer and showrunner on a multi-part documentary project for RadicalMedia and Apple TV+, currently in post-production.

Earlier in his career, Kliot directed several short films, public service announcements, and music videos. His short film Late Fall premiered at the Sundance Film Festival. Site, which he shot and directed, also premiered at Sundance, opened the New Directors/New Films Festival, screened in competition at the Berlin International Film Festival, and was acquired into the permanent collection of the Museum of Modern Art.

=== Teaching and Academic Work ===
Kliot graduated summa cum laude from Amherst College and was a postgraduate fellow at the École Normale Supérieure in Paris. He has served as an adjunct professor in graduate film programs at New York University’s Tisch School of the Arts, NYU Stern School of Business, and Columbia University’s School of the Arts.

From 2015 to 2022, he was the founding head of the Producing Program and a Distinguished Lecturer at Brooklyn College’s Feirstein Graduate School of Cinema.

=== Philanthropy ===
Kliot is one of the founders of City Harvest, the oldest food rescue organization in the United States.

=== Boards ===
Kliot has been on the boards of City Harvest, Indiecollect and Feirstein Graduate School of Cinema.

== Filmography ==
=== Producer/Executive Producer ===
- Games & Private Life (1991)
- Touch Base (1994)
- Welcome to the Dollhouse (1995)
- Blixa Bargeld Stole My Cowboy Boots (1996)
- Alkali, Iowa (1996)
- Black Kites (1996)
- Souvenir (1996)
- Too Much Sleep (1997)
- Strawberry Fields (1997)
- Childhood's End (1997)
- Chocolate Babies (1997)
- A, B, C…Manhattan (1997)
- O.K. Garage (1998)
- Taxman (1999)
- Three Seasons (1999)
- Return to Paradise Lost (1999)
- Chuck and Buck (2000)
- Down to You (2000)
- Series 7: The Contenders (2001)
- Little Senegal (2001)
- Love the Hard Way (2001)
- Lovely & Amazing (2001)
- Love in the Time of Money (2002)
- Never Get Outta the Boat (2002)
- The Guys (2002)
- Coffee and Cigarettes (2003)
- The Best of R.E.M.: In View 1988-2003 (2003)
- The Best Thief in the World (2004)
- The Pornographer: A Love Story (2004)
- The Assassination of Richard Nixon (2004)
- Enron: The Smartest Guys in the Room (2005)
- Bubble (2005)
- One Last Thing... (2005)
- The War Within (2005)
- Independent Lens (2005)
- S&Man (2006)
- Herbie Hancock: Possibilities (2006)
- The Architect (2006)
- Diggers (2006)
- Fay Grim (2006)
- Broken English (2007)
- Redacted (2007)
- Surfwise (2007)
- Mr. Untouchable (2007)
- Awake (2007)
- Quid Pro Quo (2008)
- Gonzo: The Life and Work of Dr. Hunter S. Thompson (2008)
- American Swing (2008)
- Staten Island (2009)
- Served Like a Girl (2017)
- What Comes Around (2018)
- Capernaum (2018)
- The Invisible Shield (2024)

=== Director ===
- Late Fall (1994)
- Site (2002)
- The Invisible Shield (2024)

== Awards, nominations, and juries ==
- 2012 Venice Film Festival Orizzonti Jury
- 2010 Sundance Film Festival Dramatic Competition Jury Member
- 2007 "Made in NY" Award, conferred by Mayor Michael Bloomberg and the New York Office of Film, Television, and Broadcasting
- 2006 Academy-Award nomination, Best Feature Length Documentary for Enron: The Smartest Guys in the Room
- 2000 Independent Spirit Award nomination, Best First Feature for Three Seasons
- 1997 Florida Film Festival Jury
