= Stephen Winter =

American film director

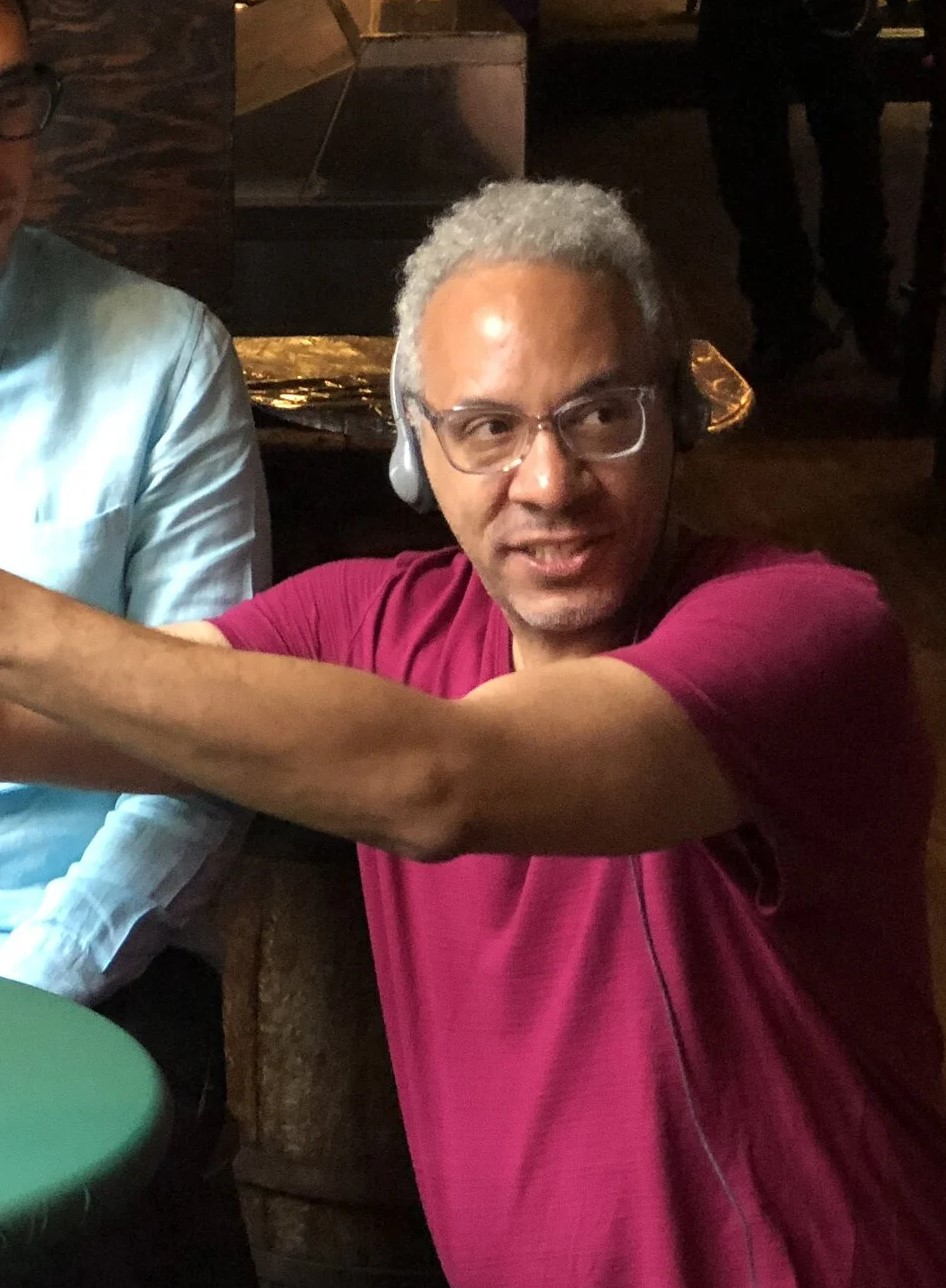
- Winter on set at Julius Bar, directing for Barefoot Wine in 2018
- Born: United States
- Occupation: Film director
- Notable work: Chocolate Babies
- Website: https://www.stephenwinter.me/

Stephen Winter is an American film director known for such works as his debut film Chocolate Babies and Jason and Shirley. Winter has described himself in interviews as "The heartbeat of queer cinema in New York City."

== Career ==
Stephen Winter made his directorial debut in 1996 with Chocolate Babies, a film about a group of queer activists of color in New York City. Filmed in just three weeks, Winter used his own apartment as a set and relied on friends to act as crew members. The film covers issues of AIDS activism and political resistance, earning critical acclaim at film festivals but initially receiving limited distribution. It later gained further recognition when it was added to the Criterion Channel in 2021. In 2003, Winter became head of the MIX NYC film festival, which led to him becoming producer of Jonathan Caouette's 2004 film Tarnation.

In 2008, Winter wrote a segment for the anthology film, New York, I Love You. In 2012–2013, Winter worked with director Lee Daniels as the head of research for The Butler, a historical drama about a White House butler who served multiple U.S. presidents. His work focused on gathering archival materials to ensure historical accuracy.

Winter returned to directing in 2015 with Jason and Shirley, a reimagined portrayal of the making of Shirley Clarke's 1967 documentary Portrait of Jason. The film delved into issues of race, power, and representation in cinema. Due to lack of funding, Winter worked full time while making the film and producing it in his spare time.

Winter co-created the Afrofuturist podcast Adventures In New America with Tristan Cowen, produced by Night Vale Presents, which premiered in 2018. The podcast blended speculative fiction with social commentary, addressing themes of racism and inequality through a science fiction lens. In 2023, he directed the narrative science fiction podcast The Space Within.

Winter has taught screenwriting as an adjunct professor in the film department of Brooklyn College.

== Critical reception ==
Jezebel wrote that Winter's films such as Chocolate Babies and Jason and Shirley are a blast.
