= Jason and Shirley =

- Official poster
- Directed by: Stephen Winter
- Written by: Stephen Winter; Sarah Schulman; Jack Waters
- Produced by: M. Blaine Hopkins; Stephen Winter; Jason Ryan Yamas; Ned Stresen-Reuter; Molly Epstein; Bizzy Barefoot; Blake Pruitt
- Starring: Jack Waters; Sarah Schulman; Eamon Fahey; Tristan Cowen; Tony Torn; Peter Cramer; Mike Bailey-Gates; Bryan Webster; Denise Dixon; Orran Farmer
- Cinematography: Ned Stresen-Reuter
- Edited by: Ned Stresen-Reuter
- Music by: Drew Brody
- Release date: June 18, 2015 (BAMcinemaFest)
- Running time: 79 minutes
- Country: United States
- Language: English

Jason and Shirley is a 2015 drama comedy fantasy film directed by Stephen Winter. The film is a historical re-imagining that revisits the making of Shirley Clarke's 1967 documentary Portrait of Jason.

The film premiered at the 2015 BAMcinemaFest at the Brooklyn Academy of Music and went on to screen at Frameline, Outfest, Austin Gay & Lesbian International Film Festival, and New Orleans Film Festival. Jason and Shirley's NY theatrical premiere was at the MoMA in October 2015.

== History ==
Many artists associated with MIX NYC, including its cofounder Sarah Schulman, were involved in the creation of the film.

Director Stephen Winter was working on The Butler, his third film with Lee Daniels, when Sarah Schulman, renowned writer and activist, proposed that two of their mutual friends, performers Jack Waters and Bizzy Barefoot, had conceived a character based on Jason Holliday from the 1967 documentary Portrait of Jason by Shirley Clarke. Schulman's idea was for Winter to direct a new film about the "behind the scenes" of Portrait of Jason starring Waters as "Jason" and Schulman as "Shirley." The film would not be a remake, but a fiction that drew upon emotional truths from the point-of-view of Jason Holliday.

Production came together quickly, as did the script. Waters was in charge of writing "Jason," and Schulman was tasked with "Shirley." A team from New York's vibrant New Queer Vanguard of Brooklyn and other diverse artistic blocs was assembled. Ned Stresen-Reuter became Director of Photography and Editor. Winter met Producer Jason Ryan Yamas when he worked with Jonathan Caouette on the sequel to his internationally influential documentary Tarnation, which Winter produced. Artist and bon vivant Bizzy Barefoot was the choice for Production Design and Costumes. Bizzy also served as acting coach for Jack Waters, with Broadway veteran Schele Williams.

Winter wrote roles for the actors he wished to cast. Mike Bailey Gates is an emerging video artist, photographer and fashion muse, perfect for the mysterious spirit "Billy-Boy." Eamon Fahey, as naïf "Nico" is a New York native Winter has known since he was a teen. Bryan Webster plays 'Candy Man,' and was Winter's first friend upon moving to New York. Peter Cramer as "The Matron" is a central downtown fixture and Jack Waters' better half. Denise Dixon, "Momma," is Winter's neighbor and a Brooklyn science teacher. Tristan Cowen as "John," hardworking cameraman, is Winter's "Game of Thrones" buddy. Orran Farmer, Winter's brother-in-law, came out of actor-retirement to play handsome, authoritative "Carl." And Tony Torn as racist DP "Saul" starred in the first play Winter saw in New York, "Tight Right White" by the legendary Reza Abdoh. Torn's parents Rip Torn and Geraldine Page were present at the first screening of Portrait of Jason in 1967 – another example of the fantastic synchronicity this project experienced.

The only inspiration films Winter watched were Hitchcock's Psycho and The Trial by Orson Welles, both starring haunted gay icon Anthony Perkins. Winter writes:

I choose to shoot on S-VHS so the beauty and volatility of an antiquated format would mirror our subject's vintage intensity, but also to let go from the indie film "Tyranny-of-Video-Playback." I directed primarily with my heart and the outcome is a film that looks and feels exactly how I wanted from conception.

== Reception ==
The film received rave reviews in advance of its BAMcinemaFest premiere. Richard Brody of The New Yorker hailed it as "one of this year's finest offerings ... ingeniously conceived and acted." A.O. Scott of The New York Times described the film as "self-contained drama that feels like a documentary, and a historical re-enactment that seems to be happening in the present even as it offers astute commentary on the past."

Tavia Nyong'o of The Guardian wrote:

Although the burnishers of Clarke's legacy have regrettably chosen to see things otherwise, Jason and Shirley is the best possible thing that could happen to Portrait of Jason. For generations of queer men of color who have been horrified by Holliday's on-screen fate, Jason and Shirley offers a reinvention of a historical moment that sought to consign them to the roles of mascots and scapegoats. Once disposable, in Winter's able hands Holliday returns, available for reinvention.

Jonas Mekas, a contemporary of Shirley Clarke and Jason Holliday, said the film was "amazing ... like being back in Shirley's apartment."

Jason and Shirley also received ringing endorsements from John Cameron Mitchell, Ira Sachs, John Krokidas, and Jonathan Caouette.

Amy Heller of Milestone Films, who have restored and released much of Shirley Clarke's cinematic legacy, was scathing of the film's liberally applied artistic license and many historical inaccuracies.

== See also ==
- LGBT culture in New York City
- African-American culture
