= Zipper (film) =

- Theatrical release poster
- Directed by: Mora Stephens
- Written by: Mora Stephens; Joel Viertel
- Produced by: Mark Heyman; R. Bryan Wright; Amy Mitchell-Smith; Marina Grasic; Joel Viertel
- Starring: Patrick Wilson; Lena Headey; John Cho; Dianna Agron; Christopher McDonald; Ray Winstone; Richard Dreyfuss
- Cinematography: Antonio Calvache
- Edited by: Joel Viertel
- Music by: H. Scott Salinas
- Production companies: Magnolia Financial Group; Protozoa Pictures; 33 Pictures; Hyphenate Films; Cargo Entertainment
- Distributed by: Alchemy
- Release dates: January 27, 2015 (Sundance Film Festival); August 28, 2015 (United States)
- Running time: 112 minutes
- Country: United States
- Language: English

Zipper (also known as Reckless) is a 2015 American political thriller film written and directed by Mora Stephens and starring Patrick Wilson, Lena Headey, Dianna Agron, Richard Dreyfuss, Ray Winstone, and Penelope Mitchell. The film had its world premiere on January 27, 2015 at the Sundance Film Festival. The film was released on August 28, 2015, in a limited release in the United States and through video on demand by Alchemy. The film follows a federal prosecutor running for office who cannot stop himself from sleeping with high-class escorts, putting both his career and his personal life at risk.

== Plot ==
Sam Ellis is a man on the rise—a hot-shot prosecutor on the cusp of a bright future. When an intern at the office becomes infatuated with him, Sam unwisely attempts to quiet his desires by seeing a high-class escort—only to discover that the experience is more fulfilling and exhilarating than he could have imagined. A second appointment with an escort soon follows, and a third, sending his once idyllic life spiraling out of control. In the midst of wrestling with his demons, he suddenly finds himself being groomed to run for the Senate—thrusting him into the public spotlight, and forcing him to take increasingly dangerous measures to keep the press, the law, and his wife off his trail.

== Cast ==
- Patrick Wilson as Sam Ellis
- Lena Headey as Jeannie Ellis
- Dianna Agron as Dalia
- Alexandra Breckenridge as Christy
- Penelope Mitchell as Laci / Jennifer
- Richard Dreyfuss as George Hiller
- Ray Winstone as Nigel Coaker
- John Cho as EJ
- Billy Slaughter as Sam's Aide
- Christopher McDonald as Peter Kirkland

== Reception ==
Zipper has received negative reviews from critics, despite praise for Wilson's performance. The review aggregator website Rotten Tomatoes reported a 20% rating, with a rating average of 4.38/10 based on 30 reviews. The website's critics consensus reads, "Patrick Wilson tries his best to elevate tawdry material, but Zipper is a morality tale that makes its points so clumsily that they inspire more unintentional laughter than thought." It has a score of 39% on Metacritic.

Jordan Hoffman of The Guardian gave the film 2/5 stars, saying, "What's ultimately frustrating about Zipper is that it seems like it has something important to say about infidelity and the sex industry, but can't decide what that should be." David Rooney of The Hollywood Reporter also gave the film a negative review: "There's neither topicality nor bite in this bland pseudo-thriller, which lathers on composer H. Scott Salinas' high-suspense score like shower gel after sweaty sex, yet rarely musters an ounce of genuine tension." Another negative review from Geoff Berkshire of Variety said, "Tawdry but cripplingly self-serious, the second feature from Mora Stephens (a full decade after her little-seen, also politically themed debut Conventioneers) benefits from Patrick Wilson's committed star turn. Still, the awkward end product would inevitably struggle in theatrical venues, making it more advisable to play to the base and go straight to VOD and premium cable."

Despite having several negative reviews, Fred Topel from CraveOnline gave the film a positive review, with a score of 9.5/10, saying, "Zipper whips out the thrills… This year's Gone Girl… The grown-up thriller of the year."

== Release ==
The film had its world premiere at the Sundance Film Festival on January 27, 2015. Shortly after it was announced Alchemy had acquired distribution rights to the film. The film was released on August 28, 2015, in a limited release and through video on demand.
