= Redaction (disambiguation) =

Redaction is the removal of sensitive information from a document to allow its distribution.

Redaction, redact or redacted may refer to:

- Redaction (editorial synthesis), the editorial integration of multiple versions of a document
- Redacted (film), a 2007 film
- Torah redactor, a hypothetical intermediate editor in the process of creating the Torah
