= The War Within (film) =

2005 film directed by Joseph Castelo

- DVD cover
- Directed by: Joseph Castelo
- Written by: Ayad Akhtar; Joseph Castelo; Tom Glynn
- Produced by: Jason Kliot; Joana Vicente; Tom Glynn
- Starring: Ayad Akhtar; Nandana Sen; Firdous Bamji; Sarita Choudhury; Charles Daniel Sandoval
- Cinematography: Lisa Rinzler
- Edited by: Malcolm Jamieson
- Music by: David Holmes
- Production companies: HDNet Films; Coalition Films
- Distributed by: Magnolia Pictures
- Release dates: September 13, 2005 (TIFF); September 30, 2005
- Running time: 119 minutes
- Country: United States
- Languages: English; Urdu

The War Within is a 2005 American political drama film directed by Joseph Castelo, who wrote the screenplay with Ayad Akhtar and Tom Glynn. The film stars Akhtar as Hassan, a Pakistani engineering student who is apprehended by Western intelligence services for suspected terrorist activities. It also stars Nandana Sen, Firdous Bamji, Sarita Choudhury, and Charles Daniel Sandoval.

The War Within had its world premiere at the 30th Toronto International Film Festival on September 13, 2005 and a limited theatrical release on September 30, 2005. The film was nominated for two Satellite Awards and two Independent Spirit Awards.

== Plot ==
The War Within is the story of Hassan, a Pakistani engineering student in Paris, who is apprehended by American intelligence services for suspected terrorist activities. After his interrogation, Hassan undergoes a radical transformation and embarks upon a terrorist mission, surreptitiously entering the United States to join a cell based in New York City. After they have meticulously planned an event of maximum devastation, the members of the cell are arrested, except for Hassan, Khalid, and their cell leader Izzy.

With no alternative and nowhere else to turn, Hassan must rely on the hospitality of his former best friend Sayeed, who is living the American dream with his family in New Jersey. To go forward and carry out his own attack, Hassan takes advantage of Sayeed's generosity while plotting his strategy and amassing materials to create explosives. Eventually, Hassan's skewed religious fervor clashes with his feelings for Sayeed and his family, especially Sayeed's young son Ali, his eight-year-old daughter Rasheeda, and Sayeed's sister Duri, with whom Hassan begins to fall in love.

When Izzy is arrested, Khalid and Hassan decide to use the explosives in a suicide attack on Grand Central Station. Duri discovers Hassan mixing the explosives in her brother's house. When Sayeed tries to stop him, Hassan knocks him out and runs away. Duri follows Hassan to stop the attack. At the last minute, Khalid loses his nerve and Hassan goes to the target alone. Duri arrives at Grand Central Station just before Hassan detonates his explosive belt. After the attack, Sayeed is held by the police, who believe that he helped Hassan.

== Cast ==
- Ayad Akhtar as Hassan
- Firdous Bamji as Sayeed
- Nandana Sen as Duri
- Sarita Choudhury as Farida
- Charles Daniel Sandoval as Khalid
- Varun Sriram as Ali
- Anjeli Chapman as Rasheeda
- John Ventimilgia as Gabe
- Aasif Mandvi as Abdul
- Ajay Naidu as Naveed
- Kamal Marayti as the Imam
- Samrat Chakrabarti as Interrogator
- Wayman Ezeil as Izzy
- Mike McGlone as Mike O'Reilly
- Christopher Castelo as Steven
- James Rana as Saudi Man
- Christine Commesso as News Anchorwoman
- John Zibell as Officer Carroll
- Angel Desai as Reporter

== Production notes ==
Ayad Akhtar, Joseph Castelo and Tom Glynn wrote the film while students at Columbia University's Film School. Castelo came up with the idea for the film after reading an article about a Palestinian suicide bomber. They approached both Miramax Films and Fine Line Features to finance the film, but both companies refused, citing the subject matter as too controversial for American audiences.

The film was shot on location in New York City and Jersey City. Sameer Bajar and Afia Nathaniel provided the Urdu dialogues for the film.

== Reception ==
The War Within received mainly positive reviews from critics. It has an aggregate rating of 72% on Rotten Tomatoes and 61 out of 100 on Metacritic.

== DVD release ==
The DVD for The War Within was released on January 17, 2006. It features commentary by Joseph Castelo and Ayad Akhtar, 8 deleted scenes and an alternate beginning.

== Awards and nominations ==
Year	Award	Category	Nominee(s)	Result
2005	10th Satellite Awards	Best Film – Drama	Joseph Castelo	Nominated
2005	10th Satellite Awards	Best Original Screenplay	Ayad Akhtar; Joseph Castelo; Tom Glynn	Nominated
2006	21st Independent Spirit Awards	Best Screenplay	Ayad Akhtar; Joseph Castelo; Tom Glynn	Nominated
2006	21st Independent Spirit Awards	Best Supporting Male	Firdous Bamji	Nominated
