= Scratch Massive =

French DJ duo

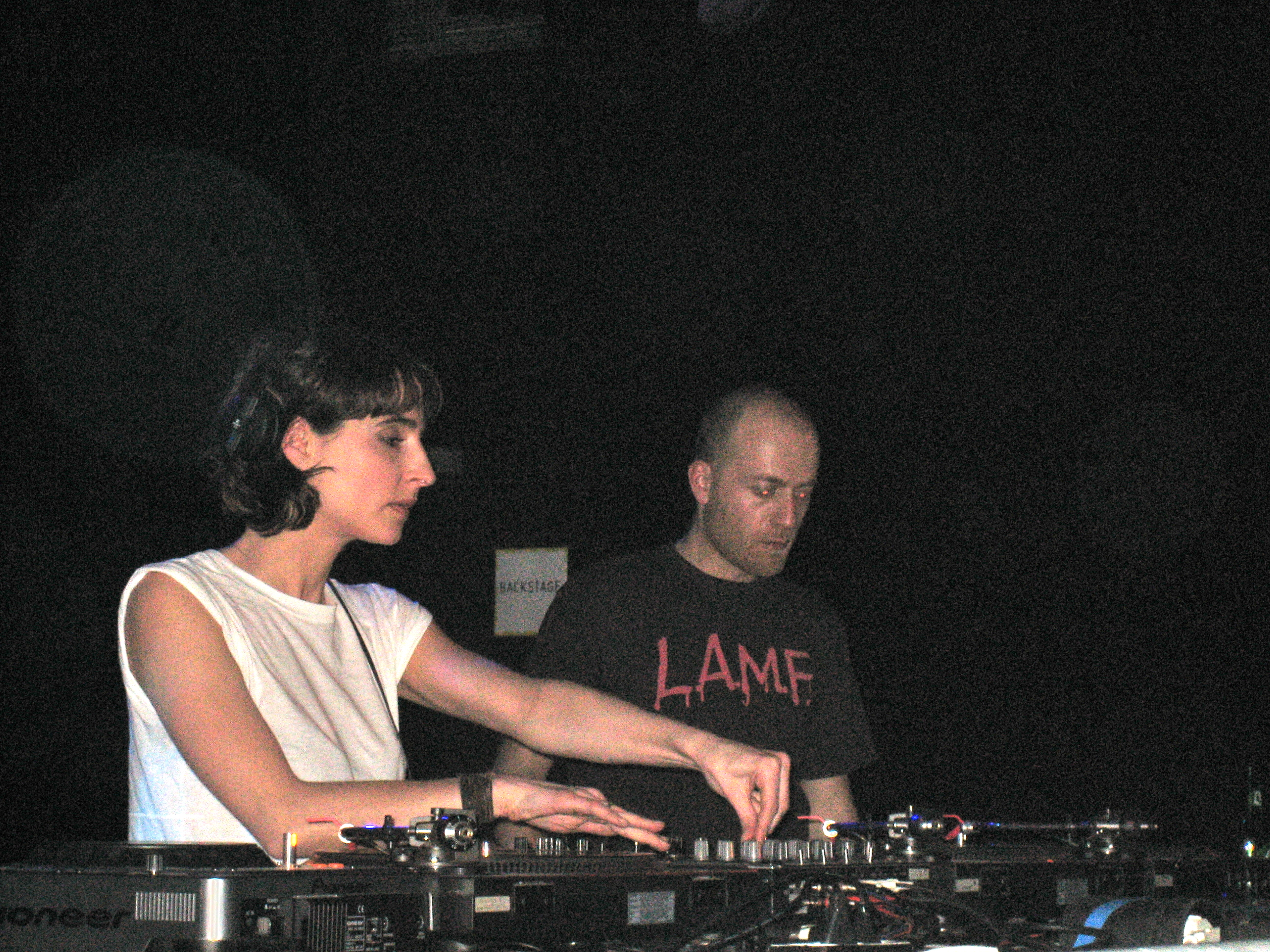

Background information
- Genres: Synthwave, Electronic
- Years active: 1994 - present
- Labels: bORDEL Records, MBF, Pschent, Warner Bros
- Members: Maud Geffray, Sébastien Chenut

Scratch Massive is a French DJ duo, composed of Maud Geffray and Sébastien Chenut.

== Biography ==
Scratch Massive was formed in 2001, and is active in the French electronic music scene, and are DJs as well as composers and music producers. In 2001, the duo released two EPs, La Face Cachée and Icebreaker, which Pascal Bertin referred to as "little bombs", and which have been remixed numerous times.

In 2003, Scratch Massive released their first album, titled Enemy & Lovers. According to Joseph Ghosn, the album departs from the group's techno origins, incorporating pop and rock sounds, even moving towards psychedelic sound. Pascal Bertin described it as "an electronic music album which benefits from channeling powerful rock energy". The album was produced by Cristian Vogel of Super Collider who, according to Ghosn "brightens the overall sound of the album" and provides a "dirty and hallucinogenic" consistency.

In 2007, both the second album, Time, and Broken English, were released, the latter being a soundtrack composed for the first feature film of the same name by Zoe Cassavetes. The album, Time, was mastered by Moritz von Oswald, and features a cover version of The Cure's Three Imaginary Boys. According to Matthieu Choquet, the album "is more electro than its predecessors" and features new wave influences.

Their third album, Nuit de Rêve (Night of Dreams), was released in 2011. The single, Paris, featuring Daniel Ágúst Haraldsson from the group GusGus, benefitted from a music video directed by Zoe Cassavetes in which she featured Cécile Cassel. In 2013, the live album, Communion was published, featuring tracks from Nuit de Rêve.

The fourth album, Garden of Love containing the track Last Dance which Maud Geffray sings on, was released in 2018.

In 2021, to commemorate the tenth anniversary of the l'album, Nuit de Rêve, un album of remixes was published (10 Year Anniversary Edition).

== Discography ==
=== Studio albums ===
- 2003 : Enemy & Lovers
- 2007 : Time
- 2011 : Nuit de rêve
- 2018 : Garden of Love
- 2019 : Garden of Love - Remixes
- 2025 : Nox Anima

=== Singles and EPs ===
- 2017 : Sunken (Single)
- 2018 : Last Dance
- 2020 : Warzone - Scratch Massive Remixes

=== Mixes ===
- 2005 : Naked
- 2009 : Joy

=== Soundtracks ===
- 2007 : Broken English
- 2016 : Day out of Days
- 2017 : Junior
- 2021 : Preliminaires

=== Live albums ===
- 2008 : Underground needs your money baby
- 2013 : Communion
- 2021: Live in Paris
