= One Last Thing... =

2005 film

- Theatrical release poster
- Directed by: Alex Steyermark
- Written by: Barry Stringfellow
- Produced by: Jason Kliot; Susan A. Stover; Joana Vicente
- Starring: Michael Angarano; Cynthia Nixon; Sunny Mabrey; Gina Gershon
- Cinematography: Chris Norr
- Edited by: Michael Berenbaum
- Music by: Anton Sanko
- Distributed by: Magnolia Pictures
- Release dates: September 12, 2005 (TIFF); May 5, 2006 (United States)
- Running time: 96 minutes
- Country: United States
- Language: English

One Last Thing... is a 2005 American comedy-drama film directed by Alex Steyermark and written by Barry Stringfellow. It was produced by HDNet Films, screened at the 2005 Toronto International Film Festival on September 12, 2005, and had a limited release in the United States on May 5, 2006, by Magnolia Pictures.

== Plot ==
Dylan, a high school student with an inoperable brain tumor, lives with his widowed mother Karen in Marcus Hook, Pennsylvania. He is invited on television by a wish-granting organization and stuns viewers with his wish: He wants to spend a weekend alone with supermodel Nikki Sinclair.

Living in New York City, Nikki is watching television and hears about Dylan's wish; she is convinced by her agent to see Dylan, as part of a publicity stunt to improve Nikki's image, but her visit is very brief. Dylan is disappointed and decides to raise money and travel to New York, trying to see Nikki again.

Karen struggles with allowing her sick son (traveling with two friends) to be unsupervised in an unfamiliar city. Nikki has her own problems and is reluctant to even speak to Dylan.

Striking out and growing sicker, Dylan and his friends take a cab back to Pennsylvania, and eventually to the hospital. Surprisingly, Nikki shows up and, at his request, takes Dylan to the beach. They spend the day together talking, fishing, and kissing, eventually falling asleep on a blanket.

In the morning, Nikki discovers that Dylan has died. Nikki attends his funeral with friends and family. As he enters the afterlife, Dylan arrives on the beach to see his father, who died years before, fishing. He invites Dylan to join him. Dylan asks his father how he knows this is not a dream. His father replies, "You don't, and you never will".

== Cast ==
- Michael Angarano as Dylan Jameison
- Cynthia Nixon as Karen Jameison
- Sunny Mabrey as Nikki Sinclair
- Gina Gershon as Arlene
- Johnny Messner as Jason O'Malley
- Wyclef Jean as Emmett Ducasse
- Gideon Glick as Slap
- Matt Bush as Ricky
- Richie Rich as Himself
- Michael Rispoli as Babba
- Gia Carides as Madelene
- Ethan Hawke as Earl Jameison, Dylan's father (uncredited)

== Release ==
The region 1 DVD was released on May 23, 2006.
