= Love in the Time of Money =

- Official DVD cover
- Directed by: Peter Mattei
- Written by: Peter Mattei
- Produced by: Jason Kliot; Lisa Bellomo; Joana Vicente; Gretchen McGowan
- Starring: Steve Buscemi; Vera Farmiga; Rosario Dawson; Jill Hennessy; Malcolm Gets; Michael Imperioli; Adrian Grenier
- Cinematography: Stephen Kazmierski
- Edited by: Myron I. Kerstein
- Music by: Theodore Shapiro
- Production companies: Blow Up Pictures; Open City Films; Sagittaire Films
- Distributed by: Blow Up Pictures; ContentFilm International; ThinkFilm
- Release dates: January 11, 2002 (Sundance); November 1, 2002 (United States)
- Running time: 90 minutes
- Country: United States
- Language: English
- Box office: $10,410

Love in the Time of Money is a 2002 American romantic comedy-drama film written and directed by Peter Mattei, and starring Steve Buscemi, Vera Farmiga, Rosario Dawson, Malcolm Gets, Jill Hennessy, and Adrian Grenier. The film, executive produced by Robert Redford, premiered at the Sundance Film Festival on January 11, 2002. It had a limited release in the United States on November 1, 2002.

Production began in New York City on January 29, 2000.

== Cast ==
- Steve Buscemi as Martin Kunkle
- Vera Farmiga as Greta
- Rosario Dawson as Anna
- Malcolm Gets as Robert Walker
- Adrian Grenier as Nick
- Jill Hennessy as Ellen Walker
- Carol Kane as Joey
- Michael Imperioli as Will
- Domenick Lombardozzi as Eddie Iovine
- Nahanni Johnstone as Marianne Jones
- Alexa Fischer as Elaine
- Ross Gibby as Jack
- John Ottavino as Mark Jones
- Tamara Jenkins as Gallery Owner

== Reception ==
=== Critical response ===
The film received a mostly negative response from film critics. On review aggregator website Rotten Tomatoes, the film holds an 18% approval rating, based on 39 critical reviews, with an average rating of 4.2/10. A. O. Scott of The New York Times wrote, "Mr. Mattei's use of digital video, his fondness for extreme close-ups and his balky, fumbling dialogue were clearly meant to give Love in the Time of Money a rough, naturalistic feel. But those techniques only highlight the film's artificiality, making you gratingly aware of how much has been left out and how much of the drama is based on secondhand assumptions rather than genuine insight."

Lisa Schwarzbaum of Entertainment Weekly wrote, "It's not about love. It's not about money. It's not even about sex, although the transaction of cold, love-starved sexual business propels the daisy-chain encounters that make up Love in the Time of Money. If anything, theater director Peter Mattei's dingy, mannered, visually ragged resetting of Max Ophuls' unimprovable 1950 beaut La Ronde (based on an 1896 play by Arthur Schnitzler) is about scenes of cap-A acting by a roundup of cap-I indie thespians, captured on brutally flat and blotchy cap-DV digital video."

Duane Byrge of The Hollywood Reporter wrote, "Despite the evocative aesthetics evincing the hollow state of modern love life, the film never percolates beyond a monotonous whine."

=== Accolades ===
Year	Award	Category	Recipient(s)	Result
2002	Gotham Awards	Open Palm Award	Peter Mattei	Nominated
2003	Casting Society of America	Best Casting for a Feature Film – Independent	Sheila Jaffe and Georgianne Walken	Nominated
