= Chocolate Babies =

- Directed by: Stephen Winter
- Produced by: Jason Kliot, Joana Vicente
- Starring: Sean Barr; Suzanne Gregg Ferguson; Dudley Findlay Jr.; Jon Kit Lee; Michael Michelle Lynch; Claude E. Sloan; Bryan Webster
- Cinematography: Chris Shaw
- Edited by: Francisco Macias
- Production company: Open City Films
- Release date: 1996
- Running time: 83 minutes
- Country: United States
- Language: English
- Budget: $36,000

Chocolate Babies is a 1996 American film directed by Stephen Winter. The film stars Sean Barr, Suzanne Gregg Ferguson, Dudley Findlay Jr., Jon Kit Lee, Michael Lynch, Claude E. Sloan and Bryan Webster. The film premiered on July 21, 1996, at Outfest in Los Angeles.

== Synopsis ==
The film follows a group of queer activists of color in New York City that implemented actions against conservative politicians in response to the AIDS epidemic in the 1990s within African American communities.

They maintain that cutting funding for people with AIDS is racist, as working-class people of color are more likely to contract AIDS than any other group. Their protests included smearing an African American councilman with stage blood.

The films self-description reads: "raging, atheist, meat-eating, HIV-positive, colored terrorists" fighting back against homophobic conservative politicians on the streets of New York.

== Cast ==
- Dudley Findlay Jr. – Larva
- Bryan Webster – Councilman Melvin Freeman
- Gregg Ferguson – Jamela
- Michael Hyatt – Lauretta
- Claude E. Sloan – Max
- Jon Kit Lee – Sam
- Michael Michelle Lynch – Lady Marmalade
- Sean Barr – Red Haired Politician

== Background and production ==
It was very much what I wanted, and every time I look at it, I'm like, yeah, that's just really, really tight.

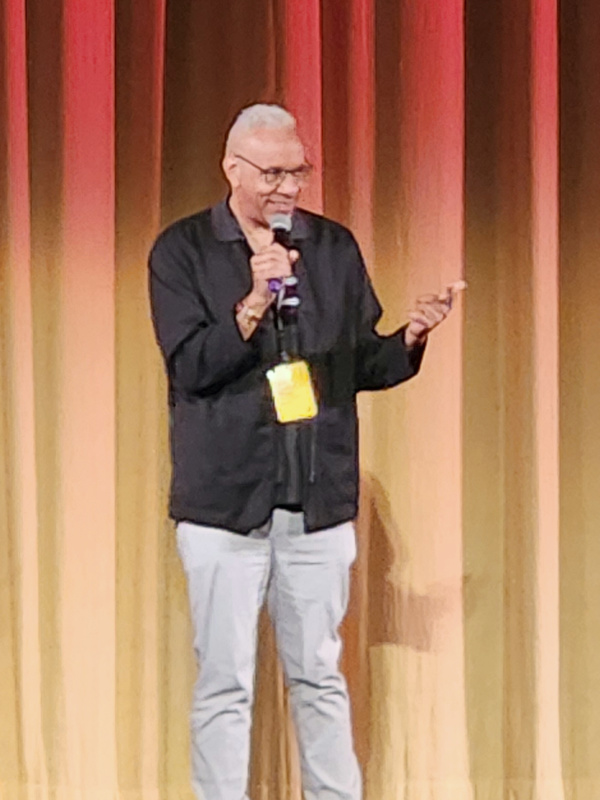
Winter at a Q & A session for Chocolate Babies at the Castro Theatre in San Francisco in 2023

Winter was in his twenties when he wrote and directed the film, and he recalls the independent filmmaking atmosphere at the time was not really ideal, and the project "didn't fit into that." He also noted that during this period, there was "systematic institutional racism and homophobia and transphobia", so it just basically went unnoticed and its message was misinterpreted. He says the film was a fantasy based on real life experiences with ACT UP Chicago and the black nationalism movement, and the plot of the film was derived from Humphrey Bogart movies.

For the characters in the film he auditioned actors from the Black queer theatre scene in New York City, and bluntly told them he was making a "comedy drama about HIV-positive Black and Asian drag queens who become political terrorists and kidnap a closeted conservative politician." Two of the characters in the film were based on friends he had when he was living in Chicago. Larva, was based on a friend who published a local magazine in Chicago, and Sam, was based on a Korean gymnast he knew from art school.

The film was shot over the course of three weeks in September 1994, on a budget of $36,000, using 16 mm Fujifilm. Winter explains that he chose Fujifilm because "unlike Kodak, Fuji was really good for non-white skin." One of the filming locations was on Winter's apartment rooftop; he liked it because he knew there wasn't going to be any traffic issues and "it's got all that light."

== Release ==
The film premiered on July 21, 1996, at Outfest in Los Angeles. In November 1996, it was screened at the New York Lesbian and Gay Experimental Film/Video Festival. In February 1997, the movie had its world premiere at the 47th Berlin International Film Festival. Additional screenings in 1997 were at the Los Angeles Independent Film Festival in April, the Philadelphia International Gay and Lesbian Film Festival in July. and the San Francisco International Lesbian and Gay Film Festival in August.

Despite receiving praise and critical acclaim at festivals, the film did not receive a wide distribution. Winters said that "unless some company gave it some kind of credence and distribution and allowed it to be seen by people, beyond here and there, it wasn't going to be seen." In September 2021, the film was made available to stream on The Criterion Channel. In 2023, the 4K restoration of the movie was shown at NewFest 35.

== Critical reception ==
Film historian Elizabeth Purchell included the film in a selection of "underseen (or just plain forgotten)" queer films. American film critic Carrie Rickey wrote in The Philadelphia Inquirer "the film's set pieces are long on flash and panache, but the film as a whole is woefully short on story."

In its review of the film, LA Weekly wrote that "considering its irrepressible divas of color and nonstop improvisational style, the movie should be spinning far out of control by the time it reaches its tender, sentimental ending." And the reason it doesn't is owed to "Winter's talent as a filmmaker and the changeable nature of his subject." Film critic Ann Hornaday described the film as "a comedy/drama about a fantasy underworld where enraged HIV-positive African Americans and Asians become terrorists and attack conservative politicians."

Kylo Hart wrote in Interdisciplinary Humanities, that the way Winter approached the film through his story and editing, "invokes a rap-influenced aesthetic and from a storytelling perspective: this means that his film features extreme characters performing extreme actions, in much the same way that rap songs and videos typically feature extreme lyrics and emotions in order to make a powerful cultural statement."

Film critic Emanuel Levy wrote that "as most AIDS stories have been serious dramas by and about white gay males, it's refreshing to see a political satire that not only revolves around men of color, but also refuses to label them as victims." He further opined that the film "displays a zesty, often exuberant style that suits the chaotic story and its flashy drag queens." Robert Julian from the Bay Area Reporter observed that the movie is "one of those little films which might serve well as a time-capsule piece to document the emotions and attitudes of gay people of color at the height of the AIDS epidemic."

== Analysis ==
Robert Mills from the University of Southampton suggests that the LGBTQ protagonists in Winter's film are criticizing what they perceive to be an alignment between the pharmaceutical companies, conservative politicians, and the queer community, and through their sometime militant actions seen in the film, are highlighting that even though effective treatments for HIV were being developed, that alone, did not signify the AIDS crisis was over, especially in relation to the African American community. He also argues that despite the fact it was initially regarded as a successful film, which received generally positive reviews; plus a number of accolades at the film festivals where it was screened, "little has been made of the implications and resonances of its radical resistant vision."

Winter's debut feature sits somewhere between satire and sincerity, advancing a timely critique of liberal responses to the ongoing AIDS crisis in a manner both fantastical and sharp. With a complex plot involving closeted gay councilmen, countless emotional conflicts, and a series of violent disputes, the film establishes a disjunctive tone that is significant in that it marked a shift away from the largely realist political critiques offered by an earlier AIDS cinema.

— Robert J. Mills, Journal of Cinema and Media Studies

== Accolades ==
The film received the Honorable Mention for Narrative Feature in 1997 at the SXSW Film Festival as well as the award for best feature at New York Lesbian, Gay, Bisexual, & Transgender Film Festival 1997. The film also received an Honorable Mention at Urbanworld Film Festival.

== See also ==
- HIV/AIDS in American films
- Films about HIV/AIDS
- List of LGBTQ-related films
- List of LGBTQ people from New York City
