= Joana Vicente =

American film producer

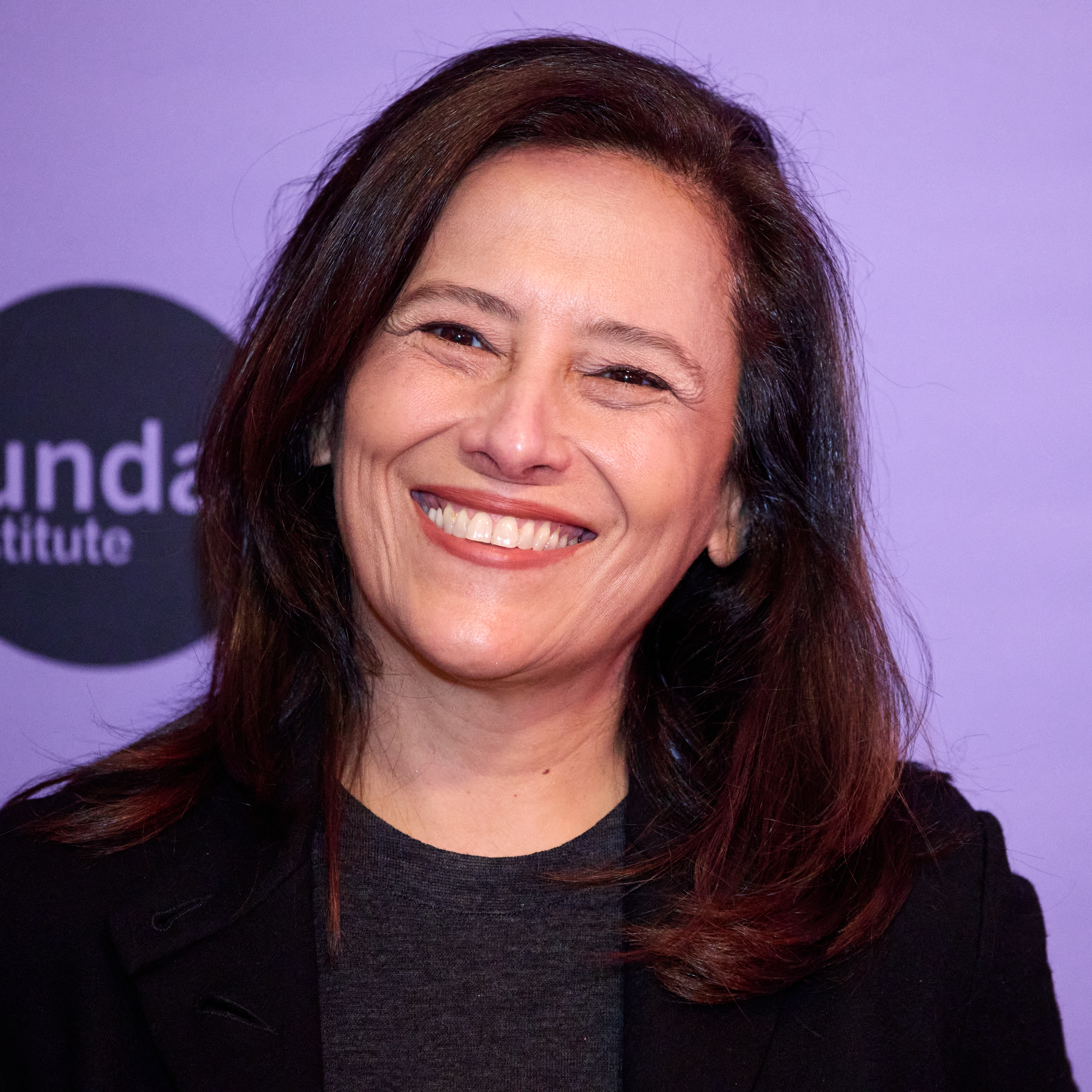
- Vicente at 2024 Sundance Film Festival
- Born: Portugal
- Education: Catholic University of Portugal
- Occupations: Film producer, executive

Joana Vicente is an American film producer and executive.

Vicente was the CEO of the Sundance Institute and Sundance Film Festival. Before joining the Institute, she spent three years as Executive Director and Co-Head of the Toronto International Film Festival (TIFF) and the TIFF organization.

Vicente spent nearly a decade as the Executive Director of the not-for-profit Independent Filmmaker Project (now the Gotham Film & Media Institute). At IFP, she founded the Made in NY Media Center, a partnership with the Mayor’s Office of Media and Entertainment and the New York City Economic Development Corporation. The Made in NY Media Center by IFP was an incubator for start-ups at the intersection of storytelling and technology.

She is a recipient of the Made in New York Award©, which she received from Mayor Mike Bloomberg for her contributions to the growth of NYC’s media and entertainment industries. Vicente was an adjunct professor at NYU Stern Business School, where she taught The Business of Film. She is also a Film Slate Advisor for the NYU Production Lab.

== Career ==
Vicente and Kliot are co-founders and presidents of Open City Films, a production company of feature films and documentaries with a catalog of films including Three Seasons, Enron: The Smartest Guys in the Room, Coffee and Cigarettes, Redacted, The Assassination of Richard Nixon, Welcome to the Dollhouse and Awake. Throughout the years, their films have been nominated for 23 Independent Spirit Awards — four have won. Their films have also been selected for the Cannes, Berlin, Venice, and Toronto film festivals and have four awards at The Sundance Film Festival.

In 1998, Vicente and Kliot founded Blow Up Pictures, a digital production company. Their first film, Chuck & Buck, was the first digital film produced and distributed in the US. It premiered at the Sundance Film Festival and was nominated for five Independent Spirit Awards in 2001. Under the Blow Up banner, Vicente and Kliot also produced Lovely and Amazing, Series 7: The Contenders, and Love in the Time of Money.

In 2003, Vicente and Kliot co-founded HDNet Films with Mark Cuban and Todd Wagner. The company produced 18 films in five years, all shot on digital video. The HDNet Films production of Steven Soderbergh's Bubble was the first film ever to be released "day-and-date," in the United States, simultaneously opening across theatrical, cable and satellite television, and home video platforms. Films produced under HDNet include Academy-Award nominated Enron: The Smartest Guys in the Room, and Redacted, which took the Silver Lion at the 2007 Venice Film Festival.

Vicente was appointed Executive Director and Co-Head of TIFF in August 2018 where she ran the festival, the Lightbox film theater complex, and year-round programming. She increased industry partnerships, with a focus on historically excluded communities, and created a new property, the TIFF Tribute Awards gala.

In September 2021, Vicente was appointed as Chief Executive Officer of the Sundance Institute, the nonprofit arts organization founded by Robert Redford. In this role, she oversaw the Sundance Film Festival as well as the Institute's year-round programs to support independent artists. She helped bring the Festival back in person. During her tenure, the Institute has created new Festivals in Asia and the Sundance Film Festival CDMX in Mexico City.

== Filmography as producer/executive producer ==
- Games & Private Life (1991)
- Touch Base (1994)
- Welcome to the Dollhouse (1995)
- Blixa Bargeld Stole My Cowboy Boots (1996)
- Alkali, Iowa (1996)
- Black Kites (1996)
- Souvenir (1996)
- Too Much Sleep (1997)
- Strawberry Fields (1997)
- Childhood's End (1997)
- Chocolate Babies (1997)
- A, B, C…Manhattan (1997)
- O.K. Garage (1998)
- Taxman (1999)
- Three Seasons (1999)
- Return to Paradise Lost (1999)
- Chuck and Buck (2000)
- Down to You (2000)
- Series 7: The Contenders (2001)
- Little Senegal (2001)
- Love the Hard Way (2001)
- Lovely & Amazing (2001)
- Love in the Time of Money (2002)
- Never Get Outta the Boat (2002)
- The Guys (2002)
- Coffee and Cigarettes (2003)
- The Best Thief in the World (2004)
- The Pornographer: A Love Story (2004)
- The Assassination of Richard Nixon (2004)
- Enron: The Smartest Guys in the Room (2005)
- Bubble (2005)
- One Last Thing... (2005)
- The War Within (2005)
- S&Man (2006)
- Herbie Hancock: Possibilities (2006)
- The Architect (2006)
- Diggers (2006)
- Fay Grim (2006)
- Broken English (2007)
- Redacted (2007)
- Surfwise (2007)
- Mr. Untouchable (2007)
- Awake (2007)
- Quid Pro Quo (2008)
- Gonzo: The Life and Work of Dr. Hunter S. Thompson (2008)
- American Swing (2008)
- Staten Island (2009)
- Capernaum (2018)

== Awards and nominations ==
- 2000 Independent Spirit Award nomination, Best First Feature for Three Seasons
- 2006 Academy-Award nomination, Best Feature Length Documentary for Enron: The Smartest Guys in the Room
- 2007 Made in NY Award, conferred by Mayor Michael Bloomberg and the New York Office of Film, Television, and Broadcasting
