= Series 7: The Contenders =

2001 film by Daniel Minahan

- Series 7 theatrical poster
- Directed by: Daniel Minahan
- Written by: Daniel Minahan
- Produced by: Jason Kliot; Katie Roumel; Christine Vachon; Joana Vicente
- Starring: Brooke Smith; Glenn Fitzgerald; Marylouise Burke; Richard Venture; Michael Kaycheck; Merritt Wever
- Narrated by: Will Arnett
- Cinematography: Randy Drummond
- Edited by: Malcolm Jamieson
- Music by: Girls Against Boys
- Distributed by: USA Films
- Release dates: January 20, 2001 (Sundance); March 2, 2001 (United States)
- Running time: 87 minutes
- Country: United States
- Language: English

Series 7: The Contenders is a 2001 American satirical dark comedy film written and directed by Daniel Minahan.

The film is presented as a marathon of the seventh series of an American reality television show called The Contenders, where six people, picked at random from a national lottery, are each given a pistol and forced to hunt and kill each other for the cameras. The film is a satire of the reality television genre.

It stars Brooke Smith as Dawn, the reigning champion from the fifth and sixth series.

== Plot ==
The film is shot in the style of a reality TV series and is set in an alternate future where a civil war in the 1990s resulted in the United States becoming a dictatorship. Five new contestants are selected in a random lottery and, along with the winner of the previous series, comprise the six Contenders. The film purposely leaves many key details unexplained, as the viewer is supposed to be watching only what the creators actually aired in the fictional TV show. The show is run by the Department of Control, which has more authority than the president, who is a figurehead, and randomly selects citizens, usually from poorer areas (each state is known as a zone), but the Contenders treat it as something they cannot control. Contenders are given a pistol loaded with polonium bullets, though they may acquire other weapons, and the last one left alive is the winner. Contestants are forced to play the game, regardless of their wishes. A contender who wins three tours of the game is freed from it.

Each series of The Contenders is played in the limits of a city or town. Series 7 is set in Newbury, Connecticut, the hometown of Dawn Lagarto (Brooke Smith), the current and longest reigning champion. She has won two tours and just needs to win one more to be set free. Dawn is eight months pregnant and hopes to win the game for her baby. The show hosts a lottery, with Contenders chosen by whichever social security number appears, contenders are implanted with tiny explosive devices that can be remotely detonated if they try to escape the game. The five contenders selected are:

- Connie Trabucco (Marylouise Burke) – 57 years old, single, emergency room nurse.
- Jeffrey Norman (Glenn Fitzgerald) – 33 years old, married, artist. He is dying of testicular cancer and is Dawn's former love.
- Anthony Reilly (Michael Kaycheck) – 39 years old, married, unemployed asbestos remover.
- Franklin James (Richard Venture) – 72 years old, retired.
- Lindsay Berns (Merritt Wever) – 18 years old, student.

Series 7 begins with a recap of the end of Series 6: the opening scene shows the heavily pregnant Dawn enter a convenience store and fatally shoot a man in a seemingly random act. The show credits then roll, its rules are explained in voice-over narration, and the contenders are introduced. Interview segments interspersed with several of the contenders' early attempts to attack each other offer insight and background on the contenders. Most unusually, Dawn and Jeffrey already know each other. They were high school sweethearts, breaking up after Dawn had an abortion and Jeffrey came to believe he was gay. Jeffrey, now married to Doria (Angelina Phillips), and Dawn meet, and the terminally ill Jeffrey asks Dawn to kill him. Dawn agrees and leaves to procure drugs, so Jeffrey can painlessly overdose.

Lindsay travels to Franklin's trailer home and, after a pep talk by her parents, attacks him. They exchange fire, but neither is killed, with Lindsay suffering a wound to her arm. Meanwhile, Anthony tries to flee with his young daughter but is badly injured (supposedly from a "self-inflicted" knife wound to the back). Connie and Dawn separately track him to the hospital, where Connie kills him by lethal injection. Following Anthony's death, the remaining contenders receive notes to meet someone from "The Underground" at a local mall, promising help escaping the game. At the mall, security confiscates Franklin's pistol, but Lindsay is passed, after stating she is part of the show. Dawn, waiting near a store, spots Lindsay, as does Franklin. Franklin creeps up behind Lindsay and beats her to death, in front of her horrified parents. Franklin announces that the show is fixed, but, before he can explain, he is killed by Connie, the mastermind behind the notes. The only contenders left are Dawn, Jeffrey, and Connie.

Dawn tracks Connie to her home but goes into labor. Connie reluctantly assists her delivery, and Dawn is transported to a local hospital to deliver. She names the baby, a girl, Jeffrey, but she is taken from her shortly after birth because of game rules. Contender Jeffrey, despondent when Dawn does not return to kill him as promised, is also in the hospital, following a suicide attempt. Connie attempts another lethal injection, but Jeffrey, who now wants to live, shoots and kills her. Dawn races to Jeffrey's room, where they realize they are the final two Contenders. They agree to meet at a neutral location for a final showdown. There, they profess their love for each other and turn against the camera crews following them.

The series finale traces Dawn and Jeffrey through surveillance footage and viewer tips to a movie theater. There, using confiscated cameras from the TV crew, they record themselves taking the theater patrons hostage and demanding the return of Dawn's baby. At this point, the narrator advises the show's audience that all remaining footage was lost due to a technical error and that the events have been reconstructed as a "dramatic re-enactment." Actors playing Dawn and Jeffrey are shown with an official of the Contenders program. Jeffrey agreed again to let Dawn kill him, but, before she could, Doria appeared and killed Dawn, saying she still loves Jeffrey. A distraught Jeffrey then shot himself. The film closes with a "promo" for the upcoming Series 8, which shows Doria in prison, denying that she killed anyone, and reveals that Jeffrey has survived and is now the reigning champion.

=== Alternate ending ===
In an alternate ending included in the DVD release, Dawn and Jeff drop their weapons and flee the theater, but are surrounded by angry fans, displeased at the anticlimactic conclusion of the standoff, and are beaten savagely before they can escape. Jeff again wakes up in a hospital as the new reigning Contender.

== Cast ==
Actor / Actress Name	Role
Brooke Smith	Dawn Lagarto
Michael Kaycheck	Anthony Reilly
Merritt Wever	Lindsay Berns
Richard Venture	Franklin James
Marylouise Burke	Connie Trabucco
Glenn Fitzgerald	Jeffrey Norman
Tom Gilroy	Pat / Dawn's Cameraman
Angelina Phillips	Doria Norman
Donna Hanover	Sheila Berns
Danton Stone	Bob Berns
Alex Yershov	Nathan
Nada Despotovich	Michelle Reilly
Stephen Michael Rinaldi	Craig
Joseph Barrett	Doctor
Mark Woodbury	Dairy Mart Clerk
Will Arnett	Announcer

== Production ==
The idea for this project came to Daniel Minahan after working as a TV producer and being fascinated by reality shows. Minahan pitched the fake reality show concept to a network executive as an actual series in 1998. The first round of notes came back from the executive. "Can it be more sexy and less violent?"

Minahan credits Videodrome, Westworld and Rollerball as primary influences.

== Soundtrack ==
The soundtrack to Series 7 was released on CD in 2001 by KOCH Records. It features music by rock group Girls Against Boys, along with other bands such as Joy Division.

(All songs by Girls Against Boys unless otherwise noted)

1. "It Begins" (dialogue track)
2. "One Dose of Truth"
3. "Let's Get It On"
4. "Unlucky Number"
5. "Creeping Feeling"
6. "I Knew Her"
7. "Whole World Watching"
8. "Phone In" (dialogue track)
9. "Tweaker"
10. "Love Will Tear Us Apart" by Joy Division
11. "Ray of Hope"
12. "Sweetness of Mine" by Julie Stephanek/Eli Janney
13. "The Set-Up"
14. "Turn It Around"
15. "Death Pact" by Robbie Kondor
16. "Wedding Serenade" by MenKing
17. "Dramatic Re-Creation"
18. "Nine Lives" (dialogue track)
19. "The Contenders"

== Home media ==
The film was released on DVD and VHS on December 18, 2001.

== Reception ==
The critical response to the film was mainly positive. Rotten Tomatoes lists the film with a 70% rating, registering 56 "fresh" reviews out of 80 with a summary of "Boasting no big-name stars, Series 7 is surprisingly well-acted. Its timing is impeccable, with its dark humor casting shadows over the enjoyment and popularity of today's reality-TV shows". Metacritic gives the film a 55% rating.

Roger Ebert gave the movie 2 1/2 stars out of 4 and wrote, "It's not the idea that people will kill each other for entertainment that makes Series 7 jolting. What the movie correctly perceives is that somewhere along the line we've lost all sense of shame in our society."

Series 7 has since been hailed as a cult film, being added to The A.V. Club's New Cult Canon.
