= Helen verDuin Palit =

American social entrepreneur

Helen verDuin Palit is an American social entrepreneur known for founding food recovery programs in several countries.

== History ==
In 1981, Helen managed Yale University's Dwight Hall Soup Kitchen in New Haven. Through a program called the New Haven Salvage Project, she designed a system in which unused food in the community could be distributed to soup kitchens and other similar services such as shelters and food pantries. She expanded this system in 1982, founding a program called City Harvest in New York City, which was the world's first food rescue. She also helped train others to create similar Harvest programs in other parts of the United States.

In 1990, Helen created the nonprofit America Harvest which focused on teaching the principles of the Harvest system to other communities in areas including USA (Philadelphia, Honolulu), Japan, Germany, and Australia.

In 1995, she created Angel Harvest in Los Angeles to manage and redistribute unused food.

In 2014, she created Maple Leaf Harvest in Canada.

== Awards and honours ==
1989 - President George Bush Sr. named Helen verDuin Palit his Fourth Point of Light in his Thousand Points of Light Community Service Award.

2014 - Recipient of the Ellis Island Medal of Honor. She was also recognized for this achievement in congress.
