= The Architect (2006 film) =

- Theatrical release poster
- Directed by: Matt Tauber
- Written by: Matt Tauber
- Based on: A stage play by David Greig
- Produced by: Joana Vicente; Jason Kliot; Danny Leiner; Declan Baldwin
- Starring: Anthony LaPaglia; Viola Davis; Isabella Rossellini; Hayden Panettiere; Sebastian Stan; Walton Goggins
- Cinematography: John Bailey
- Edited by: Tom McArdle
- Music by: Marcelo Zarvos
- Production companies: HDNet Films; Sly Dog Films
- Distributed by: Magnolia Pictures
- Release dates: April 26, 2006 (Tribeca Film Festival); December 1, 2006 (United States)
- Running time: 82 minutes
- Country: United States
- Language: English
- Budget: $10 million
- Box office: $13,737

The Architect is a 2006 American drama film directed by Matt Tauber. Based on the 1996 play by David Greig, the plot is about architect Leo Waters (Anthony LaPaglia), who is confronted by angry residents of a housing complex he designed. The buildings have created a culture of crime in the neighborhood and the residents want them pulled down. The film had its world premiere at the Tribeca Film Festival on April 26, 2006, and received a limited release in the United States on December 1, 2006.

== Plot ==
Leo Waters is a successful architect, who also teaches architecture at a local university. He has a strained relationship with his family, including his wife Julia, a housewife who spends her time tending to their luxurious modern house, their son Martin, who recently dropped out of college and has no interest to follow in his father's footsteps as an architect, and their daughter Christina, whom he watches inappropriately at times.

Tonya Neely is a cleaning lady who lives in a state-funded high-rise public housing project Leo designed several years ago in Chicago's South Side. Her son committed suicide and her eldest daughter is a young single mom. Meanwhile, Cammie, her youngest daughter attends a prestigious school on a scholarship and lives with a wealthy family Tonya knows from her work.

Tonya leads a community effort to demolish the housing project and build a new better one instead. In an attempt to gain support for her cause, Tonya reaches out to Leo in a lecture and asks him to sign her petition calling for the demolition of the project. He initially defends his work, but later comes up with an idea on how to improve the project by modifying its current design without the need for a complete demolition. He later invites Tonya to his house to share his vision but she is appalled by his proposed approach, especially as he has not bothered to visit the project since it was built.

Meanwhile, Martin travels to the housing project to see it for himself, and meets Shawn, young gay prostitute who lives in the project. Shawn had attempted suicide by jumping off a roof of a building, in the same manner Tonya's own son killed himself.

Leo goes to the housing project to meet Tonya. He tells her that he agrees to sign her petition, but she informs him that the authorities have already agreed to demolish the project. Martin walks to the roof of one of the buildings, where he unexpectedly bumps into his own father, and they share a silent emotional gaze.

== Cast ==
- Anthony LaPaglia as Leo Waters
- Viola Davis as Tonya Neely
- Isabella Rossellini as Julia Waters
- Hayden Panettiere as Christina Waters
- Sebastian Stan as Martin Waters
- Paul James as Shawn
- Serena Reeder as Cammie Neely
- Walton Goggins as Joe
- Malcolm Goodwin as Big Tim
- Marsha Stephanie Blake as Missy Neeley
- Constance Wu as Michelle
- Lynda Gravatt as Geraldine

== Reception ==
On the review aggregator website Rotten Tomatoes, 11% of 37 critics' reviews are positive, with an average rating of 4.2/10. The website's consensus reads: "A glum drama that's so self-affected it fails to affect." Metacritic, which uses a weighted average, assigned the film a score of 47 out of 100, based on 16 critics, indicating "mixed or average" reviews.
