= Gonzo: The Life and Work of Dr. Hunter S. Thompson =

- Theatrical release poster
- Directed by: Alex Gibney
- Written by: Alex Gibney; Hunter S. Thompson
- Produced by: Graydon Carter; Alison Ellwood; Alex Gibney; Jason Kliot; Eva Orner; Joana Vicente
- Narrated by: Johnny Depp
- Cinematography: Maryse Alberti
- Edited by: Alison Ellwood
- Music by: David Schwartz
- Production company: HDNet Films
- Distributed by: Magnolia Pictures
- Release dates: January 20, 2008 (Sundance); July 4, 2008
- Running time: 118 minutes
- Country: United States
- Language: English
- Box office: $1.5 million

Gonzo: The Life and Work of Dr. Hunter S. Thompson is a 2008 American documentary film written, produced, and directed by Alex Gibney. It details Hunter S. Thompson's landmark writings on music and politics. Friends and family (including Tom Wolfe and Ralph Steadman) provide interviews to help describe the mythos of Hunter and his life.

The film premiered on January 20 in the Documentary Competition at the 2008 Sundance Film Festival; it was released in US theaters on July 4, 2008, and released on DVD on November 18, 2008.

== Release ==
The film was released in theaters in the US on July 4, 2008, and in the UK later that year. The DVD was released in November 2008. The film premiered in January 2008 at the Sundance Film Festival.

== Reception ==
=== Critical response ===
The film received generally positive reviews. On the review aggregator website Rotten Tomatoes, 85% of 98 critics' reviews are positive, with an average rating of 7.3/10. The website's consensus reads: "While not the comprehensive profile of the man that his die-hard fans might have hoped for, Gonzo remains an insightful introduction to the life of rebellious writer Hunter S. Thompson and his influences." Metacritic, which uses a weighted average, assigned the film a score of 73 out of 100, based on 28 critics, indicating "generally favorable" reviews.

Kirk Honeycutt of The Hollywood Reporter opined that "a biographical documentary doesn't get any better than this". David Edelstein of New York magazine called the film "a tender, even-tempered elegy to a writer who at his peak could ingest staggering (literally) amounts of drugs and alcohol and transform, like Popeye after a can of spinach, into a superhuman version of himself—more trenchant, more cutting, more hilarious than any political journalist before or since."

The film also received positive reviews from Entertainment Weekly, The New York Times and the Chicago Sun-Times, amongst others.

=== Awards ===
The film was nominated for the Grand Jury prize in the documentary genre at the Sundance Film Festival, and for Best Documentary Screenplay at the 61st Writers Guild of America Awards in 2009. Also in 2009, the Gonzo album notes, co-authored by Johnny Depp and Douglas Brinkley, were nominated for a Grammy award.
