= City Harvest (United States) =

New York City food rescue organization

- Formation: 1982; 44 years ago
- Founder: Helen verDuin Palit, Jason Kliot, Harley Brooke-Hitching, Peter Schmidt
- Type: Non-profit organization
- Purpose: Food rescue, Food waste reduction
- Location: New York City
- Employees: 160
- Volunteers: 20,000
- Website: Official website

City Harvest is one of New York City's largest food rescue organizations. The organization collects food waste from restaurants, bakeries, and cafes.

== History ==
City Harvest is a nonprofit organization that was established in 1982. Its primary objective is to address hunger and food waste in New York City by collecting surplus food from various sources.

Its founders included Helen verDuin Palit, Jason Kliot, Harley Brooke-Hitching, and Peter Schmidt. The operation relies on the services of roughly 160 employees and 20,000 volunteers annually. Fresh fruits and vegetables form more than half of the rescued food.

In 2005, City Harvest began holding two free farmers' market-style distributions in low-income communities each month. The operation now includes nine Mobile Markets – two per borough – each month, distributing approximately three million pounds of fresh produce a year. In 2013, these markets delivered around one million pounds of produce to 50,000 residents.

In December 2011, City Harvest opened its 45,400 square foot Food Rescue Facility in Long Island City, Queens. The facility includes a large cooler and freezer to hold perishable food on a short-term basis and a large dry storage area to sort non-perishable goods.

City Harvest hosts annual events such as the City Harvest Gala, Summer in the City, and BID.

== Leadership ==
City Harvest’s Food Council has more than 70 members. The current chair of the Food Council is Geoffrey Zakarian. Founding Food Council members include:

- Éric Ripert
- Dana Cowin
- Michael Lomonaco
- Danny Meyer
- Drew Nieporent

== Programs ==
Since 2006, the Healthy Neighborhoods initiative has expanded access to produce and has offered nutrition education to residents. These programs target high-need communities throughout the five boroughs.

=== Emergency food programs ===
City Harvest delivers over 10 million pounds of food (60% of which produces) each year to emergency food programs located within designated Healthy Neighborhoods. Soup kitchens and food pantries are then able to offer participants a variety of food. Through the Agency Capacity Expansion (ACE) program, City Harvest offers grants for one-time projects to selected emergency food programs to upgrade facilities and services. In addition, City Harvest University's courses teach agencies core skill sets.

=== Educational outreach ===
Developed by Share Our Strength, Cooking Matters workshops educate all age groups on how to develop and maintain a healthy diet. City Harvest teaches customers how to find affordable, healthy foods in their communities.

City Harvest also uses a nutrition education curriculum to work with low-income seniors.

== Advocacy ==
City Harvest advocates at the city, state, and federal levels for programs, policies, and actions to change the conditions that result in food insecurity and hunger. City Harvest also provides low-income New Yorkers with access to federal nutrition programs and regional food supplies.

== Awards and recognition ==
In 1989, City Harvest founder Helen verDuin Palit received a presidential citation for a private sector initiative from President George H. W. Bush as part of his 1,000 Points of Light program.

In 2003, Executive Director Julia Erickson was named the James Beard Foundation's Humanitarian of the Year, in recognition of City Harvest's work supporting recovery workers at Ground Zero, following 9/11.

In 2008, Charity Navigator awarded City Harvest with 4 stars in their charity ranking system. The Robin Hood Foundation awarded a $400,000 grant to City Harvest in 2009 based on the efficiency of City Harvest’s unique food rescue model.

The following year Executive Director Jilly Stephens was honored at the Annual Spirit of ABNY (Association for a Better New York) awards as a select New Yorker who has provided a distinguished level of service to New York City.

In The New York Times Company’s annual Nonprofit Excellence Awards, City Harvest was awarded the Silver Prize for Excellent Management in 2011.

== See also ==
- List of food banks
