= Broken English (2007 film) =

2007 film by Zoe Cassavetes

- Theatrical release poster
- Directed by: Zoe Cassavetes
- Written by: Zoe Cassavetes
- Produced by: Andrew Fierberg; Jason Kliot; Joana Vicente
- Starring: Parker Posey; Melvil Poupaud; Drea de Matteo; Justin Theroux; Peter Bogdanovich; Gena Rowlands
- Cinematography: John Pirozzi
- Edited by: Andrew Weisblum
- Music by: Scratch Massive
- Production companies: HDNet Films; Vox3 Films; Phantom Film Co. Ltd.
- Distributed by: Magnolia Pictures
- Release dates: January 20, 2007 (Sundance); June 22, 2007 (United States)
- Running time: 96 minutes
- Country: United States
- Languages: English; French
- Budget: $2 million
- Box office: $1.9 million

Broken English is a 2007 American romantic comedy-drama film written and directed by Zoe Cassavetes, in her feature directorial debut. The film stars Parker Posey, Melvil Poupaud, Drea de Matteo, Justin Theroux, Peter Bogdanovich, and Gena Rowlands.

Broken English had its world premiere at the Sundance Film Festival on January 20, 2007 and a limited theatrical release in the United States on June 22, 2007. The film was nominated for two Independent Spirit Awards: Best Female Lead for Posey and Best First Screenplay for Cassavetes.

== Plot Summary ==
Nora Wilder (Parker Posey), a single career woman, works at a Manhattan boutique hotel where her excellent skills in guest relations are the complete opposite of her skills in the romance department. If it is not her loving yet dominant mother (Gena Rowlands) attempting to set her up that consistently fails, she has her friend's (Drea de Matteo) disastrous blind dates to rely on as a backup for further dismay. She's surrounded by friends who are all either happily engaged or romantically involved and somehow, love escapes Nora—until she meets an unusual Frenchman (Melvil Poupaud) who helps her discover life beyond her self-imposed boundaries.

== Cast ==
- Parker Posey as Nora Wilder
- Melvil Poupaud as Julien Durand
- Drea de Matteo as Audrey Andrews
- Justin Theroux as Nick Gable
- Peter Bogdanovich as Irving Mann
- Gena Rowlands as Vivien Wilder-Mann
- Roy Thinnes as Peter Andrews
- Tim Guinee as Mark Andrews
- Michael Panes as Glen
- Dana Ivey as Elinor Gregory
- William Wise as William Gregory
- Josh Hamilton as Charlie Ross
- Caitlin Keats as Jennifer Ross
- Michael Kelly as Guy
- James McCaffrey as Perry
- Phyllis Somerville as Psychic
- Bernadette Lafont as Madame Grenelle
- Thierry Hancisse as Mr. Larson

== Release ==
The film screened at the 2007 Sundance Film Festival. It was also entered into the 29th Moscow International Film Festival.

== Reception ==
Broken English received mixed reviews. Film review aggregator Rotten Tomatoes gives the film a 64% "fresh" rating, based on 73 reviews. Metacritic, which uses a weighted average, assigned the film a score of 61 out of 100, based on 27 critics, indicating "generally favorable" reviews.

Jason Clark of Slant Magazine gave the film 2.5 out of 4 stars, saying, "when the picture finally resolves with the exact same ending as Richard Linklater's Before Sunset (and I mean exactly—with even the same two last lines, for God's sake), you have to wonder if Ms. Cassavetes gets out as much as her lead character eventually does." Michael Phillips of the Chicago Tribune called it a "promising first film with moments exceeding that promise."

== Awards and nominations ==
| Year | Award | Category | Nominee | Result | Ref. |
|---|---|---|---|---|---|
| 2008 | 23rd Independent Spirit Awards | Best Female Lead | Parker Posey | Nominated | |
| 2008 | 23rd Independent Spirit Awards | Best First Screenplay | Zoe Cassavetes | Nominated | |
