= Romántico (film) =

- Theatrical poster
- Directed by: Mark Becker
- Produced by: Mark Becker
- Starring: Arturo Arias; Carmelo Muñiz Sanchez
- Music by: Raz Mesinai
- Distributed by: Kino International (theatrical)
- Release dates: January 2005 (Sundance Film Festival); November 6, 2006 (United States)
- Running time: 80 minutes
- Country: United States
- Languages: English; Spanish

Romántico is a 2005 documentary film directed by Mark Becker and starring Arturo Arias and Carmelo Muñiz Sanchez.

== Recognition ==
=== Critical response ===
New York Newsday Romantico is visual poetry on the run... And, as any work of art does when it's successful, improves our perceptions of the world.”"

Slant Magazine offered in 2006 that Romántico might be the documentary of the year, in that its "sensitively detailed surveillance of one man's personal misfortune" illuminates a national crisis. They favorably compared it with Carlos Reygadas' Battle in Heaven in that both films deal with the same social circle and maintain a "vigilant aesthetic". In revisiting the film in 2010, they offered that the film was a "well-done character study" that could teach "a lot about how someone else thinks and experiences the world."

The New York Times wrote that Romántico was "a sympathetic portrait of Carmelo Muñiz Sánchez, an illegal Mexican immigrant living in San Francisco who, after scuffling for three years as a mariachi musician, returns home to care for his ailing mother." They found the film to be representative of the stories of "countless illegal immigrants" who are a "struggling shadow population that is all but invisible in the United States."

Film Threat made note that the film was originally to be about the life of two immigrant musicians in San Francisco, but due to Carmelo Muñiz Sanchez deciding to return home to Mexico during the filming, the film "evolved into a richly observed slice of life tale about a man returning home".

On review aggregator website Rotten Tomatoes, the film holds an approval rating of 96% based on 24 reviews, with an average rating of 7.4/10.

=== Awards and nominations ===
- 2005, nominated for 'Grand Jury Prize' for best documentary at Sundance Film Festival
- 2006, nominated for Independent Spirit Award for best documentary at Independent Spirit Awards
- 2006, nominated for 'Truer Than Fiction Award' at Independent Spirit Awards
