= Conventioneers =

2005 film by Mora Stephens

- Film poster
- Directed by: Mora Stephens
- Screenplay by: Mora Stephens; Joel Viertel
- Produced by: Joel Viertel
- Starring: Matthew Mabe; Woodwyn Koons; Alek Friedman
- Cinematography: Andreas Burgess; Brian O'Carroll
- Edited by: Joel Viertel
- Music by: H. Scott Salinas; Danny Manor
- Production company: Hyphenate Films
- Distributed by: Cinema Libre Studio
- Release dates: April 25, 2005 (Tribeca); October 20, 2006 (United States)
- Running time: 95 minutes
- Country: United States
- Language: English

Conventioneers is a 2005 American romantic comedy film directed by Mora Stephens (in her feature directorial debut), who co-wrote the screenplay with Joel Viertel. It stars Matthew Mabe, Woodwyn Koons, and Alek Friedman. It revolves around a Republican man who, visiting New York City for the first time as a delegate to the Republican National Convention, falls into an unlikely affair with a Democratic woman.

The film had its world premiere at the Tribeca Film Festival on April 25, 2005, and was given a limited theatrical release in the United States on October 20, 2006, by Cinema Libre Studio. It received mixed-to-positive reviews from critics, and won the John Cassavetes Award at the 21st Independent Spirit Awards.

== Cast ==
- Matthew Mabe as David Massey
- Woodwyn Koons as Lea Jones
- Alek Friedman as Dylan Murtaugh
- Alicia Harding as Elizabeth Massey
- Krista Kujat as Elena Murtaugh
- Robert O'Gorman as Nat Jones
- Nathan Phillips as Phil Zando
- Joe Schiappa as Joe Henderson
- Kate Duyn as Ann Cameron

== Production ==
Principal photography took place in New York City in 2004. In a 2007 interview, Mora Stephens explained her vision for the film:

I developed the characters and many of the scenes with the actors in rehearsal, so going into it, working in these real environments, the actors always knew who the characters were. There was never a moment where they didn't know what was going on, but I wanted the film to feel as real as possible and also give the actors as much freedom as possible, so the style grew out of that. I wanted it to feel as close to being a documentary without really being a documentary.

== Reception ==
On the review aggregator website Rotten Tomatoes, 75% of 12 critics' reviews are positive, with an average rating of 6.7/10. Metacritic, which uses a weighted average, assigned the film a score of 60 out of 100, based on 6 critics, indicating "mixed or average" reviews.

Nathan Lee of The New York Times stated, "The achievement of the film has less to do with guerrilla tactics than with its shrewd interface of the personal and political." Dennis Harvey of Variety praised, "Koons, Friedman and Mabe in particular are all terrific" and also commented, "Script by Stephens and producer-editor-spouse Joel Viertel walks a tricky middle path with seemingly casual, semi-improvised aplomb." Ed Gonzalez of Slant Magazine gave Conventioneers 2.5 out of 4 stars and wrote, "The film's synthesis of fiction and documentary is smooth and compelling, especially during its climax inside Madison Square Garden, but the story is smaller than its visual britches, toeing a predictable line of conflict." Eric Kohn of IndieWire opined, "The finale is both romantically tragic and crushing in a larger sense to anyone with lingering aches from the second victory of George W. Bush."
