= Firdous Bamji =

Indian-born actor and writer (born 1966)

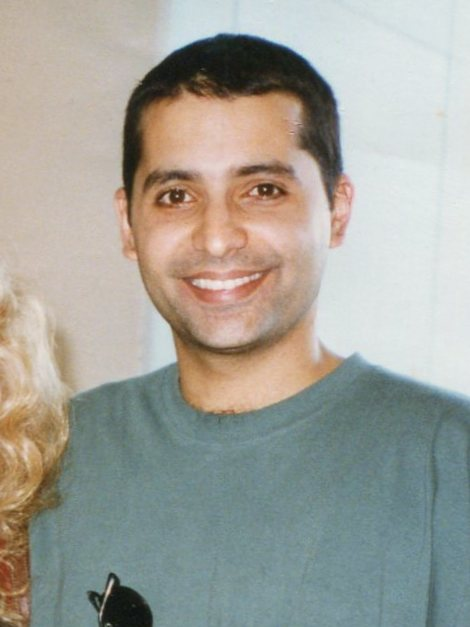
- Bamji in 1997
- Born: Firdous Esadvaster Bamji; May 3, 1966 (age 60); Bombay, India
- Education: St. Christopher's School, Bahrain, Kodaikanal International School, University of North Carolina-Greensboro, University of South Carolina
- Occupations: Actor, writer
- Spouse: Erin Thigpen (m. 1990; div. 1995)
- Partner(s): Hayley Mills (1997–present)

Firdous Bamji (born May 3, 1966) is an Indian-born actor and writer.

== Early life and education ==
Firdous Bamji was born in Bombay, India, to a Zoroastrian Parsi family that was residing in Bahrain. His father, Esadvaster, was the regional representative for Norwich Union Life Insurance Society. His mother, Roshan, was a homemaker, and both his parents were active in various civic organizations.

Bamji attended St. Christopher's School, Bahrain, a British private school, until the age of ten. In 1977, he and his two brothers were sent to Kodaikanal International School, an American boarding school in the mountains of South India.

He later attended the University of North Carolina, Greensboro, and the University of South Carolina, where he obtained a bachelor's degree in journalism and a Master of Fine Arts.

== Career ==
During his last years in undergraduate school Bamji began acting at Trustus, the first professional theatre in Columbia, South Carolina, where the iconoclastic artistic director, Jim Thigpen, took him under his wing. At Trustus he played a variety of roles, including Pale in Burn This, Torch in Beirut, Danny in Danny and the Deep Blue Sea, Peter Patrone in The Heidi Chronicles and all the parts in Eric Bogosian's solo play, Drinking in America.

After studying for an MFA in Theatre at USC, Bamji moved to Washington, D.C., to finish his degree as an apprentice at The Shakespeare Theatre. In 1994 he was cast in Eric Bogosian's SubUrbia at Lincoln Center's Mitzi Newhouse Theater, and he and his then wife, Erin Thigpen, sold the car and moved to New York City.

Bamji has appeared on stages in New York, Chicago, San Francisco, Washington, D.C., and Los Angeles and major regional theaters around the United States. He has played leading roles in world and American premieres of plays by playwrights such as Tom Stoppard, Tony Kushner, Naomi Wallace, Rebecca Gilman and Eric Bogosian.

In 2007, he was invited by director Simon McBurney to co-write and perform in a new play with the British company Complicité. The piece was to revolve around the relationship between two pure mathematicians who lived at the turn of the 20th century, the self-taught genius, Srinivasa Ramanujan and Cambridge University don, G. H. Hardy. Bamji had been interested in this story for a few years and was working on a film script when he was approached by McBurney. The result was A Disappearing Number, which won the Laurence Olivier Award and the Critics Circle Theatre Award for Best New Play and the Evening Standard Award for Best Play. Over the next four years, A Disappearing Number toured Europe, Australia, India and the United States and finished its universally acclaimed run at the Novello Theatre in London's West End.

Bamji's television credits include Law & Order and Law & Order SVU and his film credits include The Sixth Sense, Unbreakable, Analyze That, Ashes, Justice and The War Within, for which he received an Independent Spirit Award nomination. In 2015 he received an Obie Award for his performance in Roundabout Theatre's production of Tom Stoppard's Indian Ink. He has narrated more than twenty audio books, including The Gambler by Fyodor Dostoevsky, Siddhartha by Hermann Hesse, Camille by Alexandre Dumas, The Hungry Tide by Amitav Ghosh, Six Graves to Munich by Mario Puzo, and The Enchantress of Florence by Salman Rushdie, for which he received an Audie Award nomination.

== Personal life ==
Bamji lives in London with his partner, British actress Hayley Mills, whom he met when they toured America playing the lead roles of The King and I in 1997.

== Awards ==
- Obie Award (2015)
- Independent Spirit Award (2005)
- Audie Award (2009)
