= Portrait of Jason =

1967 film by Shirley Clarke

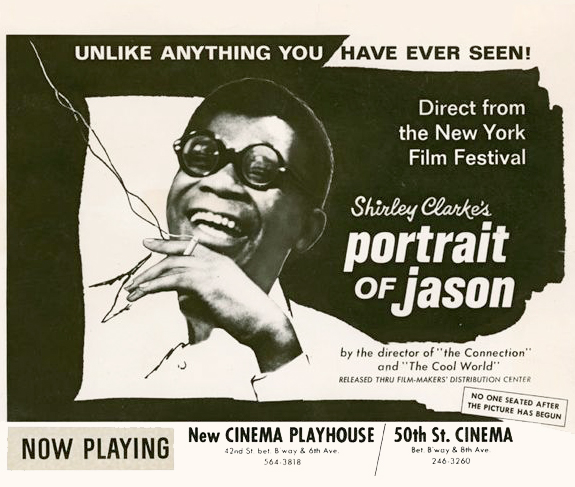
- 1967 newspaper advertisement promoting screenings of the film at New York theaters
- Directed by: Shirley Clarke
- Produced by: Shirley Clarke
- Starring: Jason Holliday; Shirley Clarke; Carl Lee
- Cinematography: Jeri Sopanen
- Edited by: Shirley Clarke
- Distributed by: Film-Makers' Distribution Center; Milestone Films (re-release)
- Release dates: September 29, 1967 (NYFF); October 2, 1967 (United States)
- Running time: 105 minutes
- Language: English

Portrait of Jason is a 1967 documentary film directed, produced and edited by Shirley Clarke and starring Jason Holliday.

In 2015, the United States Library of Congress selected the film for preservation in the National Film Registry, finding it "culturally, historically, or aesthetically significant".

== Synopsis ==
A gay African-American hustler and aspiring cabaret performer, Jason is the sole on-screen presence in the film. He narrates his troubled life story to the camera, behind which Clarke and her partner at the time, actor Carl Lee, provoke and berate Jason with increasing hostility as the film progresses. The film employs avant-garde and cinéma vérité techniques to expose the tragedy underlying Jason's theatrical, exaggerated persona.

== Production background ==
Filming for Portrait of Jason took place in the living room of Clarke's Hotel Chelsea penthouse apartment. The shoot started at 9:00 p.m. on Saturday, December 3, 1966, and ended 12 hours later. While Clarke originally intended for Jason to be the only speaking character in the film, she included the off-screen voices of her, Carl Lee, and other crew members in the final cut. She later revealed why she did this:

When I saw the rushes I knew the real story of what happened that night in my living room had to include all of us, and so our question-reaction probes, our irritations and angers, as well as our laughter remain part of the film, essential to the reality of one winter's night in 1967.

The inclusion of the off-camera voices is most important in the final reel, when Carl Lee and others begin to verbally attack Jason for wrongs he has done them or their perception of his bad character. The assaults make Jason become defensive and weepy for the first time in the film. However, by the very end of the film, he brushes off the continuing attacks by trying to make jokes of them, although, in stark contrast to the film before the final reel, he himself does not laugh. His final words are, "Finally. Oh, that was beautiful. I'm happy about the whole thing." His face is once again a completely out-of-focus abstraction, so the lack of visual information makes it difficult to know whether these words are meant to be sarcastic.

== Contemporaneous reception ==
Upon its 1967 release, Bosley Crowther of The New York Times admired Portrait of Jason as a "curious and fascinating example of cinéma vérité, all the ramifications of which cannot be immediately known." Swedish filmmaker Ingmar Bergman called Portrait of Jason "the most extraordinary film I've seen in my life."

== Restoration and re-release ==
In 2013, Dennis Doros, co-founder of Milestone Films and board member of the Association of Moving Image Archivists, gave a series of talks to universities and film societies about the search for the film, which was thought lost. However, the original print of the film had surfaced in the Wisconsin Center for Film and Theater Research archives.

An intensive restoration effort of the original print received over $26,000 from a Kickstarter campaign as well as funding from Academy Film Archive. Among other funders were Steve Buscemi, the Winterfilm Collective, and TIFF Cinematheque.

Josef Lindner and Michael Pogorzelski supervised the restoration, which involved the cooperation of the Wisconsin Center for Film and Theater Research, the Swedish Film Institute, the UCLA Film & Television Archive, the Harry Ransom Center, the Berlinale International Forum of New Cinema, and Wendy Clarke. The mastering of the restoration was completed by Modern Videofilm.

In April 2013, Milestone Films released the restored print.

== Later reception ==
As of February 16, 2023, Portrait of Jason holds a 100% approval rating on Rotten Tomatoes, based on 27 reviews, with an average rating of 8.7/10. The website's critics consensus reads: "Like any great work of art, Portrait of Jason tells a story that reaches far beyond its canvas in the act of illuminating its subject." On Metacritic, the film has a weighted average score of 87 out of 100, based on 4 critics, indicating "universal acclaim".

The Village Voice's Melissa Anderson wrote that Portrait of Jason "says more about race, class, and sexuality than just about any movie before or since."

Documentary filmmaker Connie Field assessed the film quite negatively:

I felt [Clarke] was exploiting him ... not because ... of trying to reveal a person at all. ... if you basically make someone drunk in front of your camera, that's exploitative. ... Who cares if the reality is that this person does drink a lot? You're the one supplying the liquor. ... at the end, when he is crying, I see a drunk crying, and I think only 'a drunk crying' rather than 'his soul is being revealed'.

In 2015, Stephen Winter directed a film called Jason and Shirley, starring Sarah Schulman and Jack Waters, which is a fictionalized and critical re-imagination of the daylong filming of Portrait of Jason in December 1966.

== See also ==
- List of American films of 1967

== Bibliography ==
- "Portrait of Jason press kit" (PDF) (Press release). Milestone Films. 2013.
