= Jason Holliday =

American prostitute (1924-1998)

- Jason Holliday in "Portrait of Jason," 1967
- Born: June 8, 1924; Montgomery, Alabama or Trenton, New Jersey, US
- Died: June 15, 1998 (aged 74); Flushing, New York, US
- Occupations: hustler, nightclub performer
- Known for: Star of Shirley Clarke's 1967 documentary Portrait of Jason

Jason Holliday (born Aaron Payne; June 8, 1924 – June 15, 1998) was an American hustler and nightclub performer. He is the star of Shirley Clarke's 1967 documentary Portrait of Jason.

== Life ==
The facts surrounding Aaron Payne's life are unresolved. In Holliday's own words:

Began career at five years old as errand boy for prostitutes, pimps, bootleggers, schoolteachers, doctors, lawyers, etc. — and anyone else I could get a buck out of. Lonely old men and hot old maids.

Payne said, "Jason Holliday was created in San Francisco, and San Francisco is a place to be created."

He was born in either Montgomery, Alabama, or Trenton, New Jersey. His parents, Fannie and Eugene, owned Payne's Restaurant in Trenton, but were from the South. Payne attended Rider Business College for one year before moving on to the Actors Workshop in Hollywood, where he studied with Charles Laughton. He then studied at the American Academy of Dramatic Arts in New York, along with Carl Lee, the man who introduced Payne to Shirley Clarke.

The details get even less clear after Portrait of Jason. In 1967, Holliday recorded an LP of a comedy act which was eventually released in 2007 as an edited version.

Aaron Payne's obituary appeared in The Trentonian on July 31, 1998. He died in Flushing and was survived by two sisters, six nieces and two nephews, and was cremated at Oxford Hills Crematory in Chester, New York.

== Portrait of Jason ==
A month before shooting, Holliday met Andy Warhol at a bar through Paul Morrissey. Warhol attempted to make a film starring Holliday and Edie Sedgwick, but it never materialized. Shirley Clarke went on to make Portrait of Jason.

In an interview with Jonas Mekas for his Village Voice column in 1967, Holliday said:

I know I am a great actor and I got a chance to prove it ... I wondered if people would think I was a homosexual, bisexual or heterosexual. I wondered if I was great enough to convince them I was all three … I was aware filmwise of what I was doing. I never got too far beyond my image. But what is my image? Other than a well-dressed, well-liked swinging cat? I also play many roles in life. I was also hip enough to do it on the screen – dig it?

Richard Brody wrote of Holliday's performance:

"Jason Holliday," the character in the film, is the performance of the frustrated performer who performs everywhere but where he wants to (on stage), the mask for a man who lives with masks, whose very persona is that of the mask and whose most scathingly self-revealing stories concern his ruses, his evasions, his deceptions...

The film critic Vito Russo wrote: "two hours with Jason Holliday is like a month in another country."
