= Redacted (film) =

2007 film directed by Brian De Palma

- Theatrical release poster
- Directed by: Brian De Palma
- Written by: Brian De Palma
- Produced by: Jason Kliot; Simone Urdl; Joana Vicente; Jennifer Weiss
- Starring: Zahra Alzubaidi; Ty Jones; Kel O'Neill; Daniel Stewart Sherman; Izzy Diaz; Rob Devaney; Patrick Carroll
- Cinematography: Jonathon Cliff
- Edited by: Bill Pankow
- Distributed by: Magnolia Pictures
- Release dates: August 31, 2007 (Venice Film Festival); November 16, 2007 (United States)
- Running time: 90 minutes
- Countries: United States; Canada
- Language: English
- Budget: $5 million
- Box office: $782,102

Redacted is a 2007 American war film written and directed by Brian De Palma. It is a dramatization of the 2006 Mahmudiyah rape and murders in Mahmoudiyah, Iraq, when U.S. Army soldiers raped Abeer Qassim Hamza al-Janabi, a 14-year-old Iraqi girl, and murdered her along with her family. This film, which is a companion piece to an earlier film by De Palma, Casualties of War (1989), was shot in Jordan.

Redacted premiered at the 2007 Venice Film Festival, where it earned a Silver Lion Best Director award. It was also shown at the Toronto International Film Festival, the New York Film Festival and the Buenos Aires International Festival of Independent Cinema. The film opened in Spain, and in fifteen theaters in limited release in the United States on November 16, 2007. The film received mixed reactions from critics and a poor financial response in its limited U.S. release.

== Plot ==
In April 2006, Private First Class Angel Salazar, a young United States Army soldier serving in the Iraq War, is an aspiring filmmaker who enlisted in the U.S. Army to help him get into film school, following the rejection of his application to University of Southern California. Salazar, based in Camp "The Oven" Carolina, near Samarra, Iraq, is using his camcorder to record an amateur documentary, Tell Me No Lies, about his deployment in Samarra, to present to a film school of choice as part of admission. Meanwhile, a French documentary crew is shooting a documentary called Barrage while they are embedded with Salazar's platoon.

The French documentary crew films the soldiers performing their routine duties as they man a random checkpoint as part of their deployment in Iraq, to help curtail insurgent activity. The soldiers spend their days searching cars at the checkpoint. One day, the French documentary videotapes an incident in which Private First Class Reno Flake, while manning a Humvee-mounted M2 machine gun, fires on a speeding car that tries to rush through the checkpoint. A pregnant female passenger in the car is shot and is rushed to the hospital by her brother, and later dies. It is later revealed that the brother, the driver of the car, was simply trying to get his pregnant sister to the hospital, as she was in labor, and misinterpreted the soldiers' commands to stop, believing that they were telling him that he was clear to proceed.

Back at Camp Carolina, Salazar, camcorder in hand, asks Flake how he felt about killing a pregnant woman, and he replies that he felt "nothing", and that it was like "gutting catfish". When Specialist Lawyer McCoy, a married, college-educated soldier, is disgusted by this response, Salazar and McCoy press the issue further, and Flake offers a sarcastic, facetious apology to Salazar's camcorder, enjoying the limelight, which further inflames the situation. Sergeant Jim Vazquez defuses the situation before it gets out of hand, stating that, under the rules of engagement, Flake's actions were proper.

While on a foot patrol, one of the more experienced soldiers, Master Sergeant Sweet, is killed after stepping on an improvised explosive device. Flake and his friend SPC B.B. Rush are enraged by Sweet's death and wish to take revenge by attacking some Iraqis. During a poker game, Flake and Rush announce their plan to go to the house of an Iraqi family they had searched previously, with the goal of raping Farah, a 15-year-old girl who is one of the family members. Despite objections from Blix and McCoy, Flake and Rush carry out their plan, with Salazar and McCoy accompanying them; the former to videotape the incident and the latter in the hopes of stopping them.

McCoy tries to stop the duo, but he is ordered out of the house at gunpoint. Flake and Rush rape Farah as Salazar films the events using a hidden helmet-mounted video camera. Afterwards, Farah and her entire family are killed and Farah is burned. McCoy tries to tell Blix about the rape, when Rush confronts the two and threatens McCoy at knife-point, demanding he not report the rape. Afterwards, McCoy is deeply disturbed by the rape and murders, and he tells his father about the incident via webchat. His father, citing the Abu Ghraib incident, urges him not to report the incident, fearing the publicity generated would disparage the U.S. internationally. Regardless, McCoy ignores his father's objections and reports the rape, going to the Criminal Investigation Division (CID) to make them aware of the crimes and they subsequently interview him. Salazar too is disturbed by the scenes he recorded, and he meets with an Army psychologist to discuss his deteriorating mental state.

While busy making a video for his mother during a foot patrol, a preoccupied Salazar is kidnapped by insurgents at knife-point and driven away in a van. Rush notices Salazar missing and his camera, which was left behind during the kidnapping. Later, Salazar is beheaded alive by the insurgents and a video of his murder uploaded onto the internet. Before beheading him, the insurgents claim that his beheading was retribution for Farah's rape. Salazar's decapitated corpse is discovered by a Bedouin man and subsequently retrieved by U.S. soldiers. The Army alleges the rape and murder were perpetrated by insurgents, but a relative rejects the claim, stating that they are of the same sect as the supposed insurgents. After the story makes the news, Flake and Rush are arrested and interrogated by the CID and the duo conceitedly admit to the rapes in rambling racist rants.

In October 2006, after returning home from Iraq, McCoy is at a bar with his wife Judy when he is asked by his civilian friends to tell them a "war story". He obliges and tearfully tells them about the rape and murders, before sobbing into his wife's arms.

== Cast ==
- Zahra Alzubaidi as Farah, the victim.
- Izzy Diaz as PFC Angel "Sally" Salazar, USA:
  An aspiring filmmaker that enlists in the military to help him get into film school. Using his camcorder, he decides to shoot a homemade movie about his deployment in Iraq, to increase his chances of getting enrolled. After two of his fellow platoon mates rape Farrah, a teenage Iraqi schoolgirl, and murder her and her family, Salazar is kidnapped by the Mujahideen Shura Council and al-Qaeda in Iraq (AQI) while videotaping himself on a foot patrol; he is subsequently beheaded in revenge. His death has a profound effect on SPC Lawyer McCoy, causing him to report the crime to the U.S. Army Criminal Investigation Division (CID), leading to the arrests of PFC Reno Flake and SPC B.B. Rush for the gang-rape and murder of Farrah and her family.
- Rob Devaney as SPC Lawyer McCoy, USA:
  A married, college-educated soldier who enlisted in the U.S. Army, McCoy is thoroughly disgusted by the conduct of his two fellow soldiers, PFC Reno Flake and SPC B.B. Rush.
- Ty Jones as MSG James Sweet, USA:
  A tough veteran senior NCO on his third deployment to Iraq; he helps keeps his fellow soldiers in check. Highly respected by his men, when he is killed by an IED while on a foot patrol, the unit quickly spirals downward without the presence of his strong leadership, inadvertently leading to the gang-rape and murders of Farrah and her family.
- Mike Figueroa as SGT Jim "Sarge" Vazquez, USA.
- Kel O'Neill as PFC Gabe Blix, USA:
  A quiet, reserved soldier who spends his time reading books, most notably, Appointment in Samarra, by John O'Hara. He is the unit's K-9 handler, in charge of his bomb-sniffing dog, Kevin.
- Daniel Stewart Sherman as SPC B.B. Rush, USA:
  One of the unit's two troublemakers, he spends his time with his best friend, PFC Reno Flake. He is the team's M249 SAW gunner.
- Patrick Carroll as PFC Reno "Slowflake" Flake, USA:
  One of the unit's two troublemakers, he spends his time with his partner-in-crime, SPC B.B. Rush. He was named by his father, an avid gambler, after the city of Reno, Nevada, as he was fond of the city. Reno has a brother named Vegas Flake, who was named by his father after the city of Las Vegas, Nevada, which he was also fond of.
- Happy Anderson as LTC Ford, USA:
  The unit's battalion commander.

== Production ==
As Brian De Palma explained, "I was approached by HDNet to make one of their 5 million dollar movies, on anything I wanted. The only requirement was that it be shot in high definition, and I thought that was great, if I could figure out something that would work best in that medium. When I read about this incident that was so similar to the events in Casualties of War (1989) I did some research on the internet and I came up with all these unique forms where people were expressing themselves in relationship to this incident, and the war in general. That became the shape of the movie."

Principal photography commenced in Jordan in April 2007 and ended in May 2007. A sneak preview of the film was also made available by HDNet to selected LodgeNet hotel entertainment systems.

== Reception ==
=== Critical response ===
Redacted has received mixed reviews. Gary Thompson wrote in The Philadelphia Inquirer: "A repulsive movie, marred by grotesquely hammy acting and inscrutable presentation by Brian De Palma... This "typical" group of soldiers contains at least two sociopaths whose short fuses are activated by booze, pornography and violence. I found these characterizations to be nonsensical...Here, though, Redacted implies that atrocities occur with the tacit or overt support of the American people. If that were true, maybe the scene wouldn't seem so ridiculous". Variety dismissed the film by stating: "Deeply felt but dramatically unconvincing "fictional documentary" — inspired by the March 2006 rape and killings by U.S. troops in Mahmoudiya, south of Baghdad — has almost nothing new to say about the Iraq situation". Phillip Martin in the Arkansas Democrat-Gazette called the film "clumsy, heavy-handed and sullenly self-congratulatory", and denounced the film as "this utterly surreal - and phony - picture show as obscene. It's a war crime of a petty order".

Owen Gleiberman wrote in Entertainment Weekly: "why is Redacted such an excruciating experience? Because what happens within those formats is too fake to believe. The soldiers don't sound like soldiers", and concluded that the film was "so naive it's an embarrassment." Joe Morgenstern wrote in The Wall Street Journal: "The Americans are portrayed with varying degrees of loathsomeness, but there's not much variety in the film. It's all an awful aberration." Kenneth Turan wrote in the Los Angeles Times: "By any rational standard, this film is kind of a mess. Even if you agree with its politics, you will probably weep at the ineptitude of it all." Tim Robey in The Daily Telegraph wrote: "Whatever your sympathy for its politics, it really is a monstrously bad film on every level."

Roger Ebert of the Chicago Sun Times gave it 3 and 1/2 stars (out of 4), stating that "the film is shocking, saddening and frustrating". In a critical piece about the depiction of war by Hollywood, journalist John Pilger described the film as "admirable".

On the review aggregator Rotten Tomatoes, the film has a 45% approval rating based on 109 reviews, with an average score of 5.29/10. The site's consensus reads: "Despite DePalma's obvious commitment to the material and passion for the issues at hand, Redacted suffers from stereotypical characters and a forced faux-doc style". On Metacritic, the film had an average score of 52 out of 100, based on 30 reviews. The French film magazine Cahiers du Cinéma chose it as the best film of 2008.

=== Box office ===
In spite of its modest budget, the film was a box office disaster. On the weekend of its U.S. release the movie was viewed by approximately 3,000 people, grossing only $25,628. Brandon Gray, publisher of Box Office Mojo, said the low per-theater ratio made the film a flop for De Palma. The Daily Telegraph also said that the theatrical release had "bombed" in the U.S. Total U.S. gross amounted to only $65,388. International release added $716,053 for a total worldwide gross of $781,441. The film's budget was $5 million.

== Controversies ==
=== Relation to the real life incident ===
De Palma has been criticized for not including that all of the soldiers involved in the real-life Mahmudiyah killings were prosecuted for the rape and murders perpetrated. The film ends with an official investigation underway, and does not depict a trial or conviction. Kurt Loder wrote in 2007 that "all five of the soldiers involved (in the rape and murder) were arrested and charged, and three have been tried and sentenced to 90, 100 and 110 years in prison." In addition, at the time of the film's release, the alleged ringleader, PFC Steven Dale Green, was being tried in a federal court in Kentucky, reportedly facing the death penalty. Since then all legal proceedings have completed.

However, De Palma pointed out that the film itself is fictional; HDNet's lawyers told him he could not use anything real about the true event – he had to fictionalize it, and was not allowed to refer to the real event in any way.

=== Political controversy ===
The film has attracted political controversy, with claims that, though the film is based on a real event, it portrays U.S. soldiers in a highly negative light, and has contributed to anti-American sentiment in Iraq and elsewhere; for example the murders by Arid Uka. Sites like boycottredacted.com accused Brian De Palma and producer Mark Cuban of treason, and called for the general public to avoid watching the film. Republican Duncan Hunter, Ranking Member of the House Armed Services Committee complained in a letter to the chairman of the Motion Picture Association of America that the film "portrays American service personnel in Iraq as uncontrollable misfits and criminals" and "ignores the many acts of heroism performed by our Soldiers, Marines, Airmen and Sailors in Iraq." De Palma has stated that the film provides a realistic portrait of U.S. troops and how "the presentation of our troops has been whitewashed" by media. He expected that its graphic images would stir public debate about the conduct of U.S. soldiers.

Commentator Bill O'Reilly called for protests of Redacted and against Mark Cuban. O'Reilly claimed that the film demeans U.S. soldiers and may incite violence against them, and he has called on ticketholders to bring signs to Dallas Mavericks games and all theaters showing the movie, stating "Support the troops". Mark Cuban responded, saying: "The movie is fully pro-troops. The hero of the movie is a soldier who stands up for what is right in the face of adversity... I think that the concept that the enemy will see these films and use it as motivation is total nonsense. We have no plans of translating these movies to Arabic or other Middle Eastern languages...It's really easy to hate, its really hard to think issues through on their own merits. Anything that makes people think about issues is a good thing." Cuban also pointed out that, through the Fallen Patriots charitable fund that he set up and finances, over $2.5 million has been donated to soldiers in need. He went on to publish an email he received from a soldier wounded in Iraq, who wrote: "[Iraqis have] already formed their opinions of us and very little we do or say is going to change their minds. One movie, regardless of its subject matter, is not going to overcome their personal feelings about things like Abu-Ghraib, the criminal acts discussed in Redacted, their fears about security and lost loved ones".

=== Film reaction ===
During a New York Film Festival press conference for the film, De Palma mentioned that Redacted is itself redacted, due to Magnolia Pictures owner Mark Cuban "being disturbed" by the ending photo montage's imagery. A voice from the audience called out "That's not true"; with the speaker identifying himself as Eamonn Bowles, president of Magnolia Pictures. The producer of the film later appeared on stage to explain that the images were taken out not because they were disturbing, but because of concerns about the possibility that relatives of the dead persons appearing on the photographs might bring lawsuits for emotional distress and the like. Magnolia, he said, had been put in "an untenable legal position" making the movie uninsurable.

In an interview conducted the day after the uproar at the press conference, Cuban said: "There is no way I am going to include images of people who have been severely wounded or maimed and killed when the possibility exists that their families could unknowingly see the images and recognize a loved one." He also said that Magnolia had offered De Palma the option of buying the film back from the distributor in order to release it himself and "absorb 100 percent of the risk", but that De Palma did not accept. De Palma responded, "That's not true. He never offered me that opportunity, he never answered my phone calls."

== See also ==
- Cinema of Jordan
- Taryn Simon
