= The Space Within =

Audio drama

The Space Within is a podcast by Audible. The show was announced in April 2023 along with a trailer episode. The podcast is composed of eight episodes. The show was produced by Topic Studios, Freckle Films, Solaris Productions, and Ramble Road. The show is available exclusively on Audible. The show debuted on June 15, 2023. The cast includes Jessica Chastain, Bobby Cannavale, Ellen Burstyne, Michael Stuhlbarg, Shea Whigham, and Carmen Ejogo. The show was #2 in fiction on Audible in September 2023. The show starred Jessica Chastain. The show was created by Greg O'Connor and Josh Fagin. The show premiered at the 2023 Tribeca Festival. The show was nominated for best fiction podcast at the 2024 iHeartRadio Podcast Awards.
