= A, B, C... Manhattan =

1997 film

- Film poster
- Directed by: Amir Naderi
- Written by: Amir Naderi; Maryam Dalan; Ben Edlund; Jessica Gohlke; Tracy McMillan
- Produced by: Amir Naderi
- Starring: Lucy Knight
- Cinematography: William Rexer
- Edited by: Amir Naderi
- Music by: Doc Hammer
- Release date: May 1997
- Running time: 90 minutes
- Country: United States
- Language: English

A, B, C... Manhattan is a 1997 American drama film directed by Amir Naderi and starring Lucy Knight. It was screened in the Un Certain Regard section at the 1997 Cannes Film Festival.

== Cast ==
- Lucy Knight as Colleen
- Erin Norris as Kacey
- Sara Paul as Kate
- Maisy Hughes as Stella
- Nikolai Voloshuk as Stevie
- Merritt Nelson as Janet (as Rebecca Nelson)
- Arnie Charnik as Louis
- Stella Rose as Roz
- Ezra Buzzington as Zach (as Jonathan Harris)
- Brendan Sexton III as Bob
