= 2011 Lord Speaker election =

House of Lords presiding officer election

- 13 July 2011
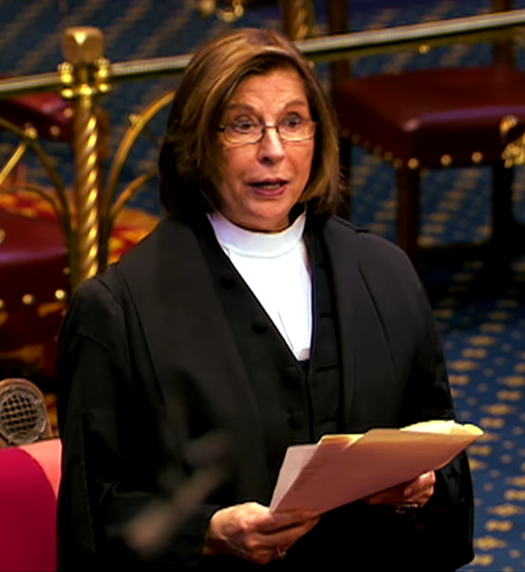

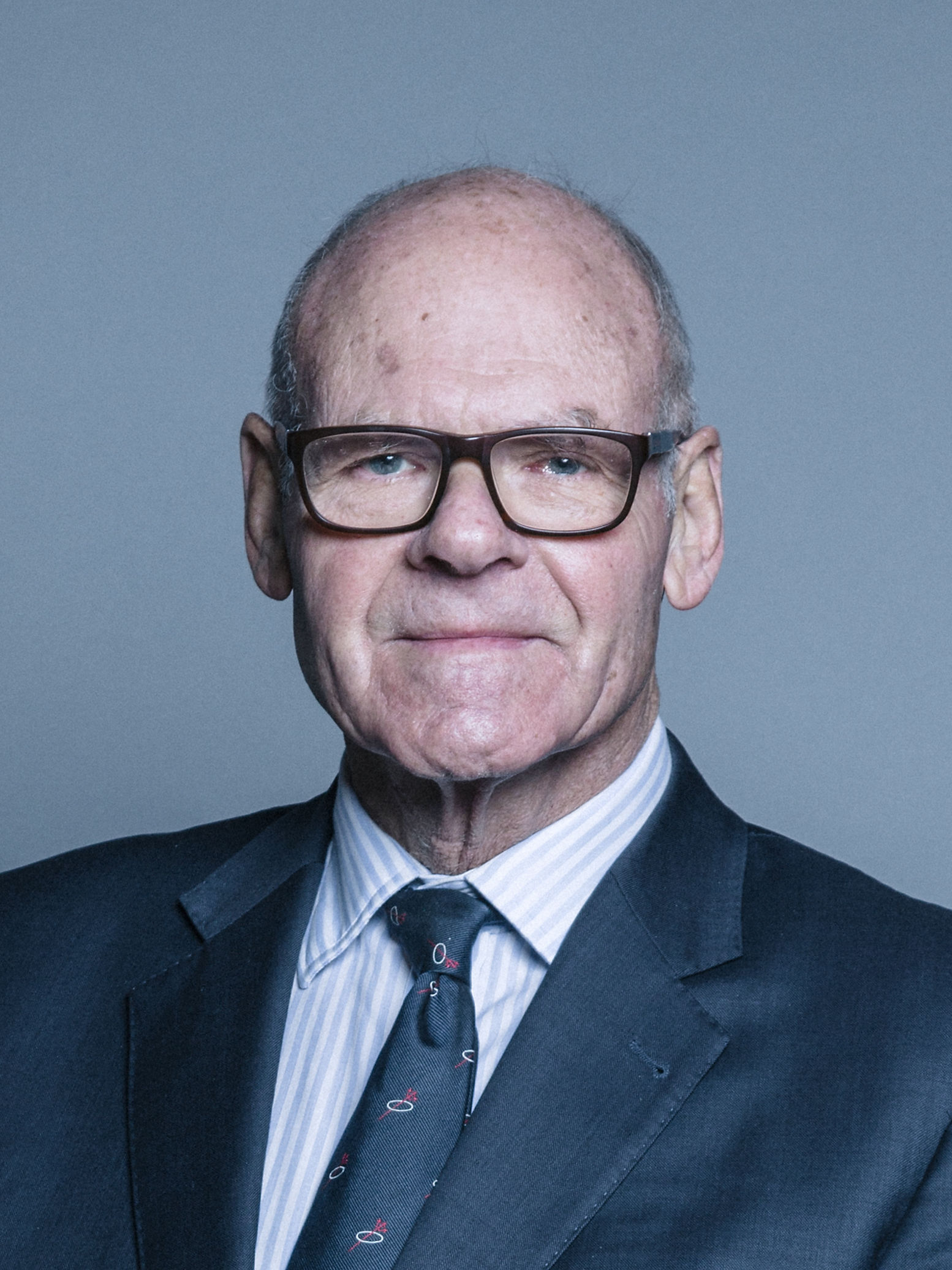
	First party	Second party
Candidate	The Baroness D'Souza	The Lord Colwyn
Party	Crossbench	Conservative
Popular vote	296	285
Percentage	50.9%	49.1%
Lord Speaker before election
The Baroness Hayman
Labour
Elected Lord Speaker
The Baroness D'Souza
Crossbench

An election for Lord Speaker, the presiding officer of the House of Lords took place on 13 July 2011, with the result announced five days later. Baroness D'Souza, Convenor of the Crossbench Peers, was elected after the 5th stage of counting. She took office on 5 September 2011.

== Candidates ==
On 9 May 2011, Baroness Hayman, who became the first Lord Speaker following her election in 2006, announced that she would not seek election to a second term. A list of six candidates was announced on 27 June 2011:

- Lord Colwyn (Conservative)
- Lord Desai (Labour)
- Baroness D'Souza (Crossbench)
- Lord Goodlad (Conservative)
- Baroness Harris of Richmond (Liberal Democrat)
- Lord Redesdale (Liberal Democrat)

== Result ==
Election of Lord Speaker, 13 July 2011
Party	Candidate	Count 1	Count 2	Count 3	Count 4	Count 5
Crossbench	✓ Baroness D'Souza	186	188	202	240	296
Conservative	Lord Colwyn	166	167	193	213	285
Conservative	Lord Goodlad	145	145	150	168	-
Labour	Lord Desai	78	79	92	-	-
Liberal Democrats	Baroness Harris of Richmond	62	65	-	-	-
Liberal Democrats	Lord Redesdale	7	-	-	-	-
Electorate: 770 Valid: 644 Quota: 323 Turnout: 644
