= 2006 Lord Speaker election =

House of Lords presiding officer election

- 28 June 2006
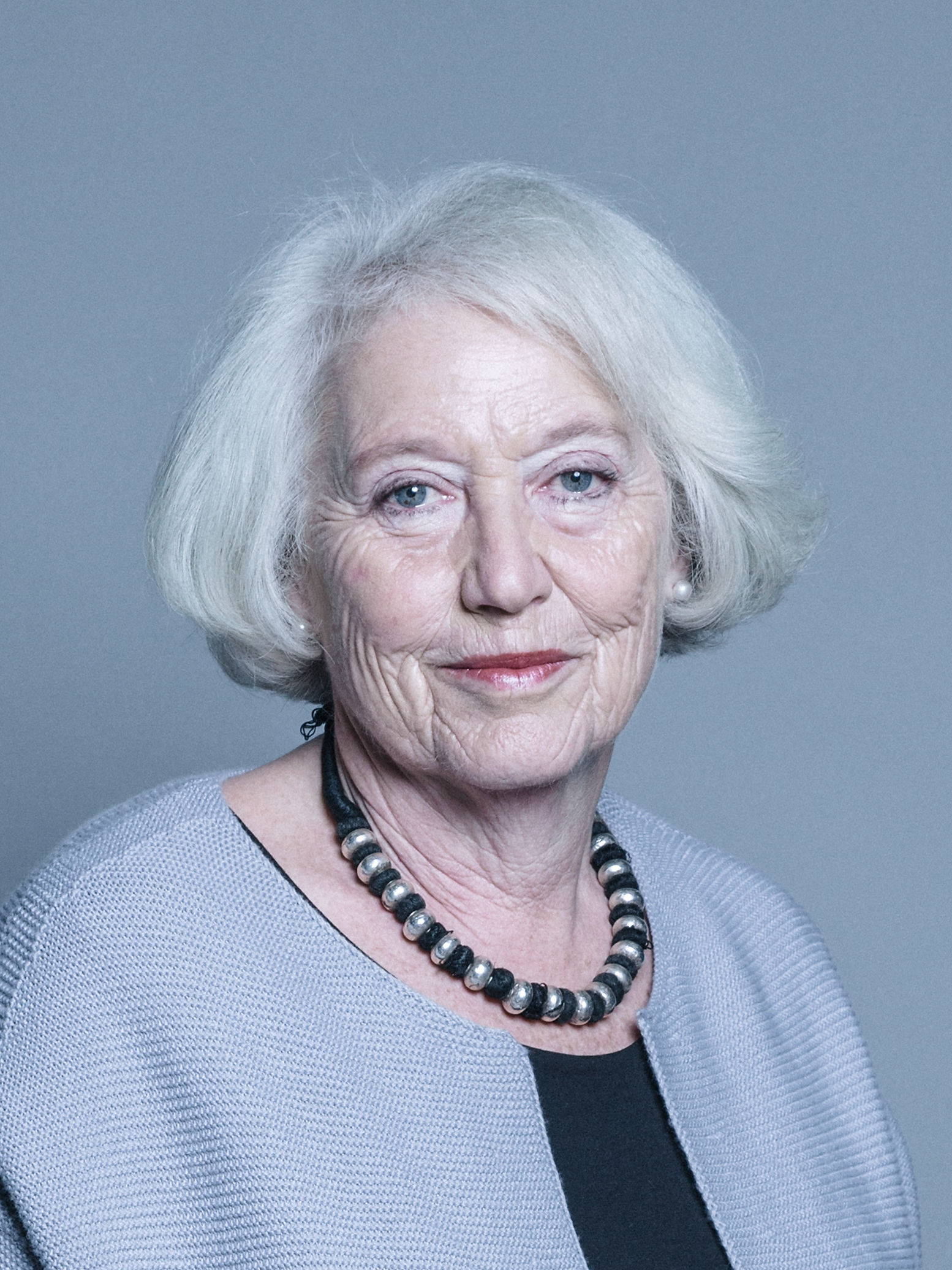
| | First party | Second party |
|---|---|---|
| Candidate | The Baroness Hayman | The Lord Grenfell |
| Party | Labour | Independent |
| Popular vote | 263 | 236 |
| Percentage | 52.7% | 47.3% |
Lord Speaker before election
Lord Falconer of Thoroton
(as Lord Chancellor)
Elected Lord Speaker
The Baroness Hayman
Labour

The first election for Lord Speaker was held on 28 June 2006 after the House of Lords had determined the title, powers and responsibilities of the office following removal of the speakership from the Lord Chancellor by the Constitutional Reform Act 2005.

== Candidates ==
A list of nine candidates for election as the first Lord Speaker was announced on 6 June 2006:

- Lord Boston of Faversham (Crossbench)
- Lord Elton (Conservative)
- Baroness Fookes (Conservative)
- Lord Grenfell (non-affiliated)
- Baroness Hayman (Labour)
- Countess of Mar (Crossbench)
- Lord Richard (Labour)
- Lord Redesdale (Liberal Democrat)
- Viscount Ullswater (Conservative)

== Result ==
Election of Lord Speaker, 28 June 2006
| Party | Candidate | Count 1 | Count 2 | Count 3 | Count 4 | Count 5 | Count 6 | Count 7 | Count 8 |
|---|---|---|---|---|---|---|---|---|---|
| Labour | ✓ Baroness Hayman | 201 | 201 | 209 | 215 | 229 | 236 | 248 | 263 |
| Independent | Lord Grenfell | 103 | 103 | 106 | 109 | 129 | 147 | 170 | 236 |
| Conservative | Viscount Ullswater | 74 | 78 | 79 | 83 | 84 | 103 | 135 | – |
| Crossbench | Countess of Mar | 55 | 56 | 59 | 64 | 66 | 79 | – | – |
| Conservative | Lord Elton | 52 | 57 | 58 | 60 | 65 | – | – | – |
| Labour | Lord Richard | 45 | 46 | 46 | 46 | – | – | – | – |
| Crossbench | Lord Boston of Faversham | 22 | 22 | 22 | – | – | – | – | – |
| Liberal Democrats | Lord Redesdale | 17 | 17 | – | – | – | – | – | – |
| Conservative | Baroness Fookes | 12 | – | – | – | – | – | – | – |
Electorate: 702 Valid: 581 Spoilt: 1 Quota: 291 Turnout: 582

The result of the election was announced on 4 July 2006, and Baroness Hayman immediately replaced the Lord Chancellor, Lord Falconer of Thoroton, on the Woolsack. The Lord Chamberlain, Lord Luce, was on hand to confirm the assent of the Queen to the election.
