= 2016 Lord Speaker election =

House of Lords presiding officer election

- 8 June 2016
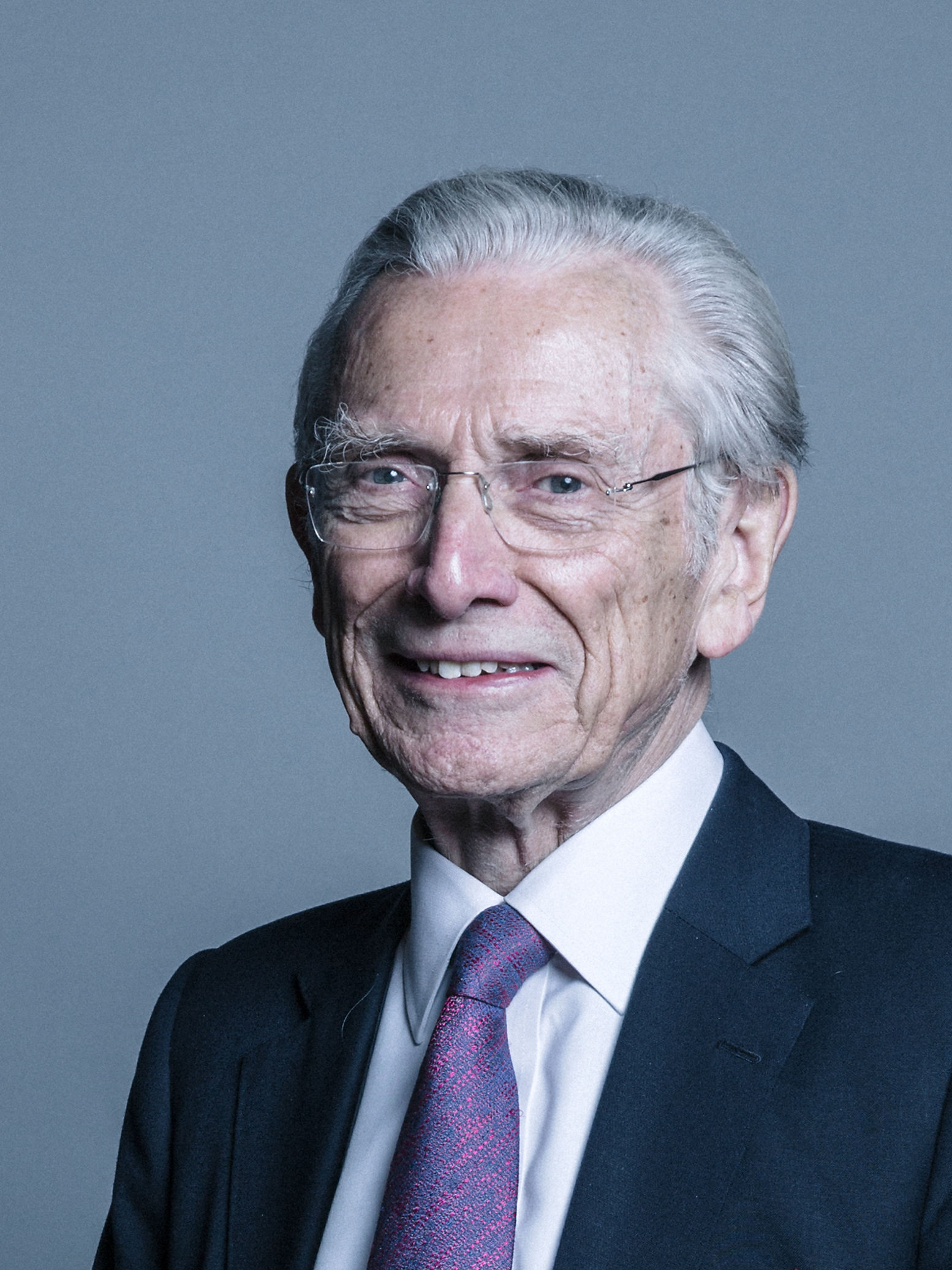

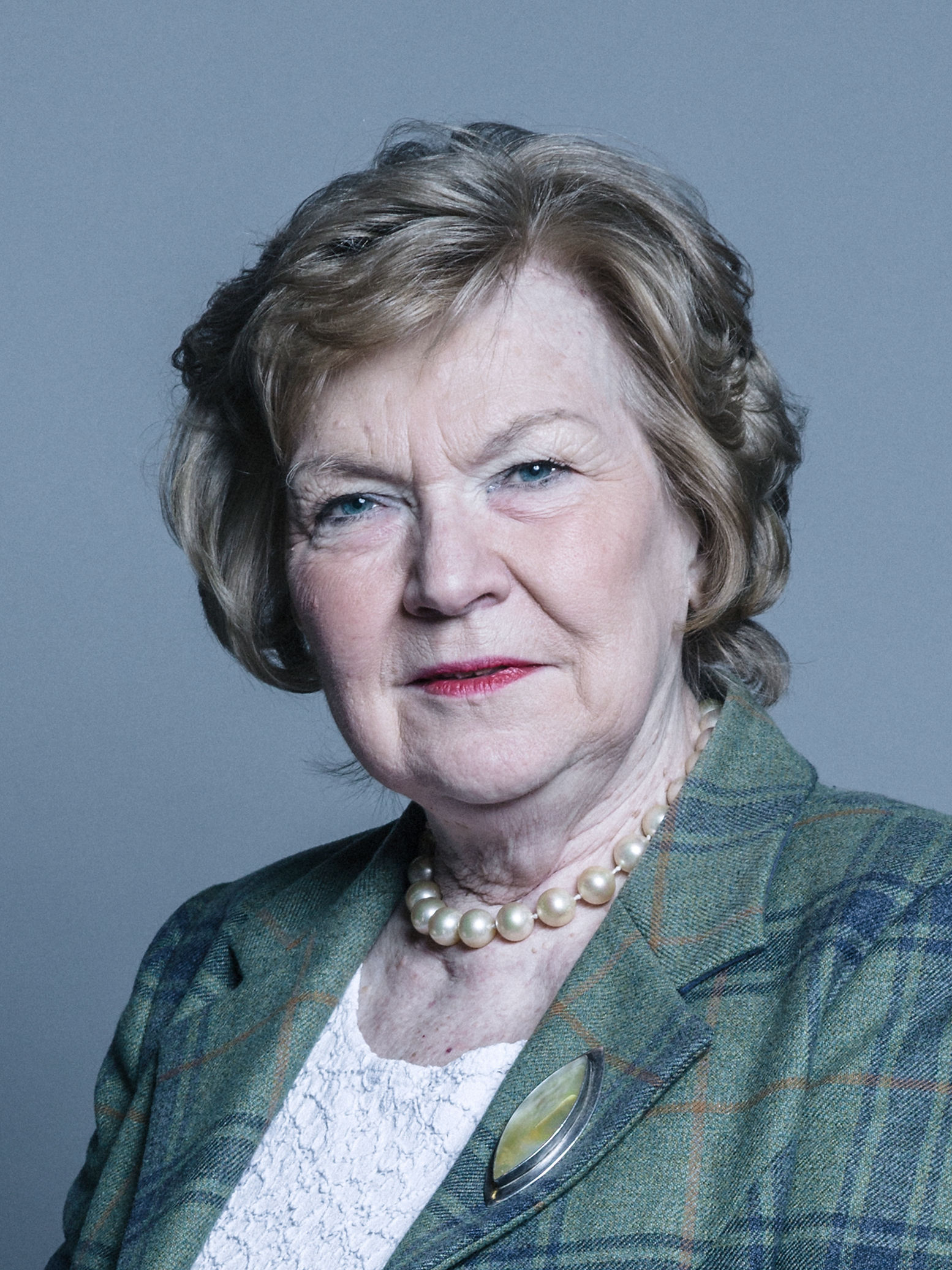

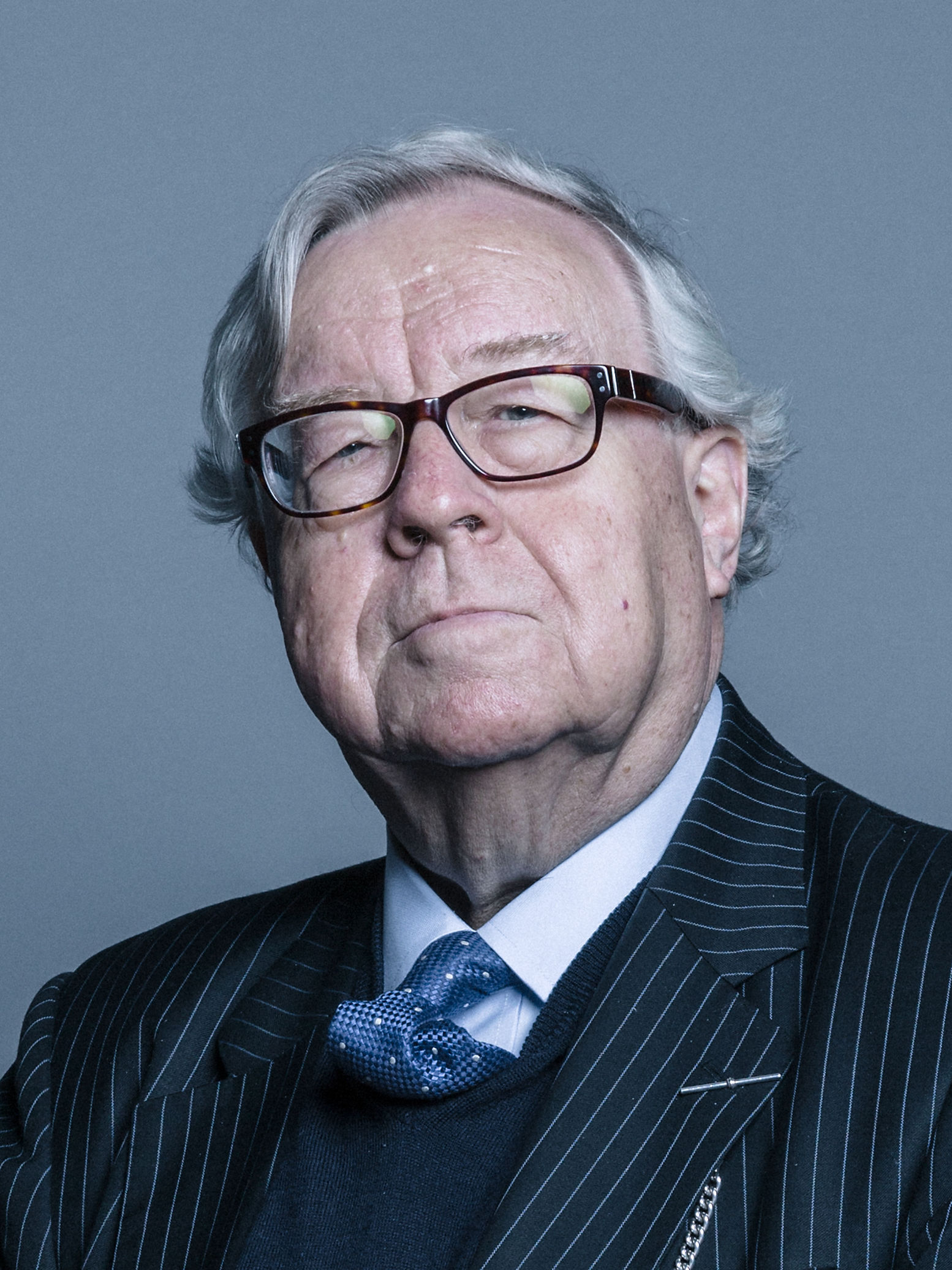
	First party	Second party	Third party
Candidate	The Lord Fowler	The Baroness Garden of Frognal	The Lord Cormack
Party	Conservative	Liberal Democrats	Conservative
Popular vote	443	111	85
Percentage	69.3%	17.4%	13.3%
Lord Speaker before election
The Baroness D'Souza
Crossbench
Elected Lord Speaker
The Lord Fowler
Conservative

An election for Lord Speaker, the presiding officer of the House of Lords, took place on 8 June 2016, with the result announced on 13 June. Incumbent Baroness D'Souza, who was at the end of her first term, announced on 11 February that she would not be standing for re-election.

== Election procedure and timetable ==
Members of the House of Lords who wished to stand for election were required to have a proposer and a seconder. The alternative vote system was used in the election and all members who had taken the oath in the then parliament and were not on leave of absence, disqualified or suspended from the House were eligible to vote.

Timetable was as follows:

- Thursday 19 May 2016 (17:00) – Candidate registration deadline
- Monday 23 May 2016 – List of candidates published and ballot papers sent to members requesting a postal vote
- Wednesday 8 June 2016 – Voting day
- Monday 13 June 2016 – Results announced and Queen's approval notified
- Thursday 1 September 2016 – New Lord Speaker taking office
- Monday 5 September 2016 – New Lord Speaker presiding for the first time

== Candidates ==
The following members of the House were registered as candidates:

- The Lord Cormack (Conservative)
- The Lord Fowler (Conservative)
- The Baroness Garden of Frognal (Liberal Democrat)

== Result ==
Election of Lord Speaker, 8 June 2016
Party	Candidate	Count 1
Conservative	✓ Lord Fowler	443
Liberal Democrats	Baroness Garden of Frognal	111
Conservative	Lord Cormack	85
Electorate: 802 Valid: 639 Quota: 320 Turnout: 640
