= Aloysius Society =

University of Oxford student philanthropy group

- Formation: 1 October 2008
- Purpose: Philanthropy
- Members: 20
- Key people: Francesca Lamarque, Lawrence Barclay
- Website: Aloysius Society

The Aloysius Society is a philanthropic group of current and former University of Oxford students dedicated to supporting those in need around the globe. Founded by Lawrence Barclay and Francesca Lamarque in 2008, Aloysius Society members organise large-scale events to raise money and awareness for their chosen charities.

Past events have included the Sugarplum Ball (2009), the Oxford Red Dress Couture Ball (2010), the Marefat Dinner (2011), the Mindful Gala Dinner (2011), and the Turquoise Gala (2015).

== Events ==
=== The Sugarplum Ball ===
The first event organised by the Aloysius Society was the Sugarplum Ball, held at the Natural History Museum on 30 November 2009 in aid of SOS Children's Villages, an organisation that provides family-based, long-term care for children who can no longer remain with their biological families. The Sugarplum Ball was attended by guests such as Sarah, Duchess of York, Princess Beatrice of York, star of the Narnia films Anna Popplewell and Sir Rocco Forte. Michelin-starred chef Tom Aikens designed the menu, Tracey Emin designed the invitations, and auction prizes included a picture of Kate Moss's bottom, owned by her. The ball's sponsors included Ivan the Terrible and Martell.

=== The Oxford Red Dress Couture Ball ===
On 18 June 2010, The Oxford Red Dress Couture Ball was a three-part event organised by the Aloysius Society in aid of H.E.L.P. charity. Participating designers included Chanel, Herve Leger, Marchesa, John Galliano, Armani and Alexander McQueen. Red, the international colour of hope for those affected by HIV/AIDS, was the unifying link carried throughout the evening's festivities, which were centred on the Oxford Town Hall and the famed Divinity School, Oxford. Prizes were donated to auction by stars such as Pete Townshend, and the event garnered the support of celebrities such as Sir Roger Moore, and industry leaders such as Anna Wintour and Harold Tillman. Cynthia Leive, editor-in-chief of Glamour US, termed the event "a truly powerful night for fashion, for academia, and for charity".

=== The Marefat Dinner ===
The Society organised the Marefat Dinner with Lord Speaker Baroness D'Souza and journalist Christa D'Souza, at The Connaught on 3 February 2011. The dinner was in aid of the Marefat High School in West Kabul, Afghanistan, which champions education in one of Kabul's most devastated districts. The dinner was attended by guests including Roland Mouret, Alice Temperley, Jemima Khan, Fatima Bhutto, Edie Campbell, Vogue editor Alexandra Shulman, Tatler editor Kate Reardon, Laura Bailey, Cherie Blair, Anya Hindmarch, Jeremy Clarkson, Mariella Frostrup, AA Gill, and Simon Cowell's Afghan fiancée Mezhgan Hussainy. The auction included prize experiences donated by Roland Mouret, Yotam Ottolenghi and the Dorchester Collection, with Jeremy Clarkson offering an impromptu driving lesson that fetched £19,000. An Afghan-inspired feast was designed by two-Michelin-starred chef Hélène Darroze, and drinks were sponsored by Moët & Chandon.

=== The Mindful Gala Dinner ===
On 21 September 2011, the Aloysius Society organised the Mindful Gala Dinner with Mind to launch the Mindful of Art exhibition curated by artist Stuart Semple. The exhibition, held in the Old Vic Tunnels, included artworks from world-renowned artists such as Tracey Emin, Jake and Dinos Chapman, Sarah Lucas, Mat Collishaw and the late Sebastian Horsley. The dinner took place at the Imperial War Museum and was hosted by Lord Melvyn Bragg and Stephen Fry, who officially took up his role as President of the mental health charity during the evening. Prizes auctioned off on the night by Sotheby's auctioneer Lord Dalmeny included a day in the recording studio with The Kooks. The menu was designed by Adriano Cavagnini, Executive Chef of the Four Seasons London, and drinks were sponsored by Veuve Cliquot.

=== The Turquoise Gala ===
On 3 October 2015, the Society organised the Turquoise Gala at the Victoria & Albert Museum with Turquoise Mountain in support of their 2016 exhibition at the Smithsonian. The evening featured an exhibition of artwork by Turquoise Mountain graduates, and a live auction run by Christie's. Auction prizes included a work of art by Antony Gormley, a music lesson with Julian Lloyd Webber, and a luxury holiday donated by Richard Branson. Desserts were sponsored by Maitre Choux, and drinks by Horiot, Red Squirrel, and Penderyn; turquoise jellies were provided by Bompas & Parr in the shape of the Blue Mosque in Mazar-i-Sharif. Guests received jam provided by Duchy Originals, arranged to reflect the historic Minaret of Jam.

== Partner events ==
The Aloysius Society also partnered with the Inca Ball, the Poppy Ball, and the Jasmine Ball. Aloysius's Lawrence Barclay and Nadeem Lalani are on the committee of the Inca Ball and Poppy Ball respectively.

== Press ==
Aloysius events have been covered by a wide range of publications, including the Evening Standard, The Guardian, Vogue, Tatler, The Sunday Times Style magazine, Grazia, Hello, Dazed Digital, Harper's Bazaar, and Time Out.
