= Christa D'Souza =

British journalist

Christa Claire D'Souza (born 1960) is a British journalist who contributes to British Vogue, The Guardian, The Sunday Times and other publications.

== Career ==
D'Souza has written for publications such as The Guardian, Daily Mail, The Times, The Daily Telegraph, Vanity Fair, the Evening Standard, and W, in addition to her current role as contributing editor of British Vogue. D'Souza was previously Editor-at-large of Tatler. D'Souza is currently a contributing writer to Get the Gloss.

In her articles, D'Souza often probes body issues such as ageing, weight-control, anorexia, food and diet, cosmetic surgery, and her own battle with cancer. D'Souza's articles have been praised for their humour and honesty and are often autobiographical and controversial in their subject matter – taking Vogue "where it's never been before" by publishing a three-page article entitled Poo, the Last Taboo.

D'Souza also specialises in interviews, and often does the cover interview for British Vogue. D'Souza has interviewed celebrities such as Rihanna, Adele, Cheryl Cole, Kristen Stewart, Gwyneth Paltrow, Angelina Jolie, Halle Berry, Catherine Zeta-Jones, Nicole Kidman and Kanye West, as well as designers such as Alexander McQueen, Tom Ford, Stella McCartney, Christopher Kane and Donatella Versace for various publications.

== Personal life ==
D'Souza is the daughter of the Baroness D'Souza, the former Lord Speaker of the House of Lords, who gave birth to Christa when she was 16. She lives in West London with long-term partner Nicholas Allott and their two sons. Her mother is English and her father is Indian-Portuguese.

D'Souza is a keen supporter of the school that her mother co-founded, the Marefat High School in West Kabul, Afghanistan. D'Souza visited the school with her mother in 2010, and has hosted fundraising events for Marefat – most recently at The Connaught hotel with Oxford University's Aloysius Society.
