= Bipartisanship =

Collaboration between political parties

Bipartisanship is a political situation, sometimes referred to as nonpartisanship and usually in the context of a two-party system (especially those of the United States and some other Western countries), in which opposing political parties find common ground through compromise. In multi-partisan electoral systems or in situations where multiple parties work together, it is called multipartisanship. Partisanship is the antonym, where an individual or political party adheres only to its interests without compromise.

== Usage ==
The adjective bipartisan can refer to any political act in which both of the two major political parties agree about all or many parts of a political choice. Bipartisanship involves trying to find common ground, but there is debate whether the issues needing common ground are peripheral or central ones. Often, compromises are called bipartisan if they reconcile the desires of both parties from an original version of legislation or other proposal. Failure to attain bipartisan support in such a system can easily lead to gridlock, often angering each other and their constituencies.

== Bipartisanship in different party systems ==
According to political analyst James Fallows in The Atlantic (based on a "note from someone with many decades' experience in national politics"), bipartisanship is a phenomenon belonging to a two-party system such as the political system of the United States and does not apply to a parliamentary system (such as the United Kingdom) since the minority party is not involved in helping write legislation or voting for it. Fallows argues that in a two-party system the minority party can be obstructionist and thwart the actions of the majority party. Analyst Anne Applebaum in The Washington Post suggested that partisanship had been rampant in the United Kingdom and described it as "a country in which the government and the opposition glower at each other from opposite sides of the House of Commons, in which backbenchers jeer when their opponents speak". Applebaum suggested there was bipartisanship in Britain, meaning a coalition in 2010 between two opposing parties but that it remained to be seen whether the coalition could stay together to solve serious problems such as tackling Britain's financial crisis during the Great Recession.

Bipartisanship (in the context of a two-party system) is the opposite of partisanship, which is characterized by a lack of cooperation between rival political parties. Bipartisanship can also be between two or more opposite groups (e.g. liberal and conservative) to agree and determine a plan of action on an urgent matter that is of great importance to voters. This interpretation brings bipartisanship closer to the more applied notion of postpartisan decision-making; a solution-focused approach that creates a governance model with third-party arbiters used to detect bias. It is also argued that bipartisanship exists in policy-making that does not have bipartisan support. This is the case if it involves bipartisan exchanges. This element is a central feature in the legislative process and is a bipartisan concept in the sense that it serves as a mechanism for achieving consensus and cooperation.

== Global examples of bipartisan politics ==
=== Australia ===
The Labor Party and the Liberal–National Coalition both support the 1996 National Firearms Agreement, 2024 legislation to ban children under 16 from social media, and opposition to the death penalty.

=== Canada ===
At the federal level, Canada has been dominated by two big tent parties practicing "brokerage politics". (Note: Brokerage politics: "A Canadian term for successful big tent parties that embody a pluralistic catch-all approach to appeal to the median Canadian voter ... adopting centrist policies and electoral coalitions to satisfy the short-term preferences of a majority of electors who are not located on the ideological fringe.") Both the Liberal Party of Canada and the Conservative Party of Canada (or its predecessors) have attracted support from a broad spectrum of voters. Although parties such as the Communist Party of Canada, the Quebec nationalist Bloc Quebecois, and others, have elected members to the House of Commons, far-right and far-left parties have never gained a prominent force in Canadian society and have never formed a government in the Canadian Parliament.

=== United Kingdom ===
Although the United Kingdom has an adversarial political system, there have often been large areas of agreement between the Labour and Conservative parties that have often but not always also brought in the Liberal Democrats. Areas of agreement have tended to include foreign policy and policy towards Northern Ireland. Other questions such as the continued existence of the National Health Service or British membership of the European Union were areas where the parties would tend to agree on the central question but were divided, often sharply, on questions of approach. There is also a convention within British politics where there are minor areas where there is little partisan cooperation to have formal and semi-secret cooperation facilitated by both parties parliamentary whips and senior civil servants, a process often referred to as the usual channels.

=== Ireland ===
Politics in Ireland has been broadly a two party system with the two main parties Fine Gael and Fianna Fáil both being supported by people from different social classes and political ideologies, with very similar and centre-right political positioning and a liberal conservative ideology. The reason they remain separate is due mainly to historical factors, with those who supported the Anglo-Irish Treaty in the 1920s eventually becoming Fine Gael, and those opposed would join Fianna Fáil and seek an independent Ireland. In many areas such as openness to Foreign Direct Investment and a stated willingness to incorporate Northern Ireland the broad policies of the two parties were very similar.

=== United States ===
James Madison argued in The Federalist Papers that a danger to democracies were factions, which he defined as a group that pushed its interests to the detriment of the national interest. While the framers of the Constitution did not think that political parties would play a role in American politics, political parties have long been a major force in American politics, and the nation has alternated between periods of intense party rivalry and partisanship, as well as periods of bipartisanship. There have been periods of bipartisanship in American politics, such as when Democrats worked with Republican President Ronald Reagan in the 1980s, with foreign policy was being seen as an area where bipartisanship was strongest with President William Howard Taft, stating that fundamental foreign policies should be above party differences. Military policies of the Cold War and actions like the Iraq War were promoted and supported, through the mass media, as bipartisan acts. A more partisan tone tended to be taken on domestic policy and this could be sharper at some times such as Barack Obama's presidency with minority parties voting as a bloc against major legislation. A call for bipartisanship is often made by presidents who "can't get their way in Congress".

== Criticism ==
Bipartisanship has been criticized because it can obscure the differences between parties, making voting for candidates based on policies difficult in a democracy. Critics of bipartisanship in the United States often refer to a "uniparty" that passes bills that do not have the full support of either party. Third parties and independents have also claimed the existence of a corrupt uniparty that represents corporations and special interest groups. Additionally, the concept of bipartisanship has been criticized as discouraging agreements between more than two parties, thus exercising a tyranny of the majority by forcing voters to side with one of the two largest parties. Analyst Benedict Carey writing in The New York Times argued that political analysts tend to agree that government will continue to be divided and marked by paralysis and feuding; according to Berkeley professor Dacher Keltner, there was research suggesting that humans have a "profound capacity through which vicious adversaries can form alliances".

== See also ==
- Grand coalition
- Uniparty
