= Wash up =

Wash up may refer to:

- Dishwashing, the cleaning of eating and cooking utensils
- Wash-up period, the period immediately before Parliament is dissolved, when outstanding Parliamentary business is concluded
