= Nick Allott =

British theatrical producer (born 1954)

Nicholas David Allott, OBE (born March 1954) is a British theatrical producer.

== Career ==
Allott is Non-Executive Vice Chairman of Cameron Mackintosh Ltd.

He was a member of the Cultural Olympiad Board 2012, a trustee of The Foundation for Sports and the Arts 1992-2012, and is currently a Director of the Roundhouse Trust and the Soho Theatre, where he was Chair from 2005 to 2019. Soho Theatre is one of the UK’s few theatres specifically producing new plays by and running workshops with new and first time playwrights.

In February 2011, Allott was appointed a member of the Theatres Trust by Culture Minister Edward Vaizey, and was reappointed for a second term till 2017. In 2013, Allott joined the Mayor of London's Strategy Group and the Creative Industries Sector Advisory Group and in 2014 was asked by The Prime Ministers Office to become a Business Ambassador for the Cultural Sector. He was a member of the Independent Advisory Panel to select the UK City of Culture 2017 (Hull).

Allott has served on the Boards of the English National Ballet, the Tricycle Theatre, the Lyric Theatre (Hammersmith), the Covent Garden Festival and Motivation (a charity that works with local partners all over the world to improve the quality of life for people with mobility disabilities). He is currently a Patron for the Coram Shakespeare Schools Festival and is a member of the Patrons Advisory Board for the UK / Australia Season 21/22.

In the 40 years he spent with Cameron Mackintosh he was the Executive Producer for the original London productions of Cats, Song and Dance, Les Miserables, Phantom of the Opera, Follies, Miss Saigon, Martin Guerre, Carousel, Mary Poppins, Hamilton and many others. He was Executive Producer for the Oscar winning Film of “Les Miserables” directed by Tom Hooper and for the multi million selling DVDs of the 25th Anniversary Concerts of Les Miserables and Phantom of the Opera. He was Managing Director of Cameron Mackintosh Ltd from 2000 - 2020 before taking a part time consultancy role with the company.

== Honours ==
Allott was appointed Officer of the Order of the British Empire (OBE) in the 2014 New Year Honours for services to theatre and charity.

== Personal life ==
Allott has two sons from his marriage to Anneka Rice and two sons with journalist partner Christa D'Souza.
