= Wash-up period =

Period of time when a UK Parliament is announced to be dissolved

The wash-up period is the last few days while a Parliament of the United Kingdom continues to sit after the Prime Minister has announced the date when Parliament will be dissolved so a general election can be held but before Parliament has been formally adjourned, prorogued or dissolved.

== Purpose ==
During the wash-up period, the government attempts to pass unfinished business which has sufficient all-party support. This may mean compromising some aspects of business to ensure that they can be completed, and effectively gives the Opposition and sufficiently large groups of backbenchers a veto on controversial or unpopular measures. Discussions about which items will progress during wash-up take place between the "usual channels" – the whips and other officials of the government and opposition parties.

Traditionally, Parliamentary bills could not be carried forward from one session of Parliament to another. Although Parliament's standing orders have allowed public bills to be carried forward to the next session of the same parliament since 2004 (and on an ad-hoc basis since 1999), bills still cannot be carried forward to the new parliament formed after a general election. If a bill does not receive royal assent before Parliament rises, it will be lost, although a new bill could be reintroduced after the general election.

If necessary, an Appropriation Bill or short Finance Bill may be introduced and pass all of its legislative stages in both Houses of Parliament during the wash-up period. In rare cases, there may also be time for private member's bills that have almost completed the legislative process to be passed.

== Protocol ==
A wash-up period is not mandatory: the Prime Minister may seek permission from the Sovereign in order to dissolve Parliament immediately, in which case all outstanding Parliamentary business will be lost. The last time an election was called with no wash-up period was 1924, when Parliament was dissolved immediately on 9 October and the general election held 20 days later. In 2001, Parliament was dissolved six days after the dissolution was proclaimed, after Parliament had been adjourned without being prorogued. In 1997, Parliament was prorogued four days after the date of the election was announced, but Parliament was not dissolved until another 18 days later.

== See also ==
- Lame-duck session
