= David Williamson, Baron Williamson of Horton =

The Right Honourable The Lord Williamson of Horton GCMG CB PC
- Williamson in 2013

Convenor of the Crossbench Peers
- In office 2004–2007
- Preceded by: The Lord Craig of Radley
- Succeeded by: The Baroness D'Souza

Member of the House of Lords
- Lord Temporal
- Life peerage 5 February 1999 – 30 August 2015

Personal details
- Born: 8 May 1934
- Died: 30 August 2015 (aged 81)
- Spouse: Patricia Smith (m. 1961)
- Children: 2
- Education: Exeter College, Oxford

David Francis Williamson, Baron Williamson of Horton GCMG CB PC (8 May 1934 – 30 August 2015) was a senior British and European civil servant, as well as a member of the House of Lords.

== Education and early life ==
Williamson was educated at Tonbridge School and Exeter College, Oxford. He served in the Royal Signals 1956–58 as his national service. He married Patricia Smith in 1961; they had two sons.

== Civil service career ==
=== Ministry of Agriculture, Fisheries and Food ===
He began his civil service career in 1958 at the Ministry of Agriculture, Fisheries and Food, becoming Principal Private Secretary to the minister in 1967.

=== European Commission ===
He was Deputy Director-General for Agriculture in the European Commission from 1977 to 1983 and Secretary-General of the European Commission from 1987 to 1997. From 1983 until 1987, Williamson had returned to the United Kingdom to serve as Deputy Secretary and head the European Secretariat in the Cabinet Office.

=== House of Lords ===
After leaving Brussels, Williamson was created a life peer on 5 February 1999 with the title Baron Williamson of Horton, of Horton in the County of Somerset, and sat as a crossbencher in the House of Lords. Lord Williamson of Horton was the convenor of the crossbenchers, a task that involves keeping the other non-aligned members up-to-date with the business of the House.

== Honours ==
As well as being appointed a Companion of the Order of the Bath (CB) in 1984 and a Knight Grand Cross of the Order of St Michael and St George (GCMG) in 1998, Williamson was awarded the Knight Commander's Cross of the Bundesverdienstkreuz by Germany, the Commander Grand Cross of the Royal Order of the Polar Star by Sweden and made Commander of the Légion d'honneur by France. He was also sworn of the Privy Council in April 2007.

Government offices
Preceded by David Hancock	Head of the European Secretariat; 1983–1987	Succeeded by Roger Lavelle
Parliament of the United Kingdom
Preceded by The Lord Craig	Convenor of the Crossbench Peers; 2004–2007	Succeeded by Baroness D'Souza
