= Woolsack =

Seat of the Lord Speaker in the House of Lords

Coordinates: 51°29′55.7″N 0°07′29.5″W

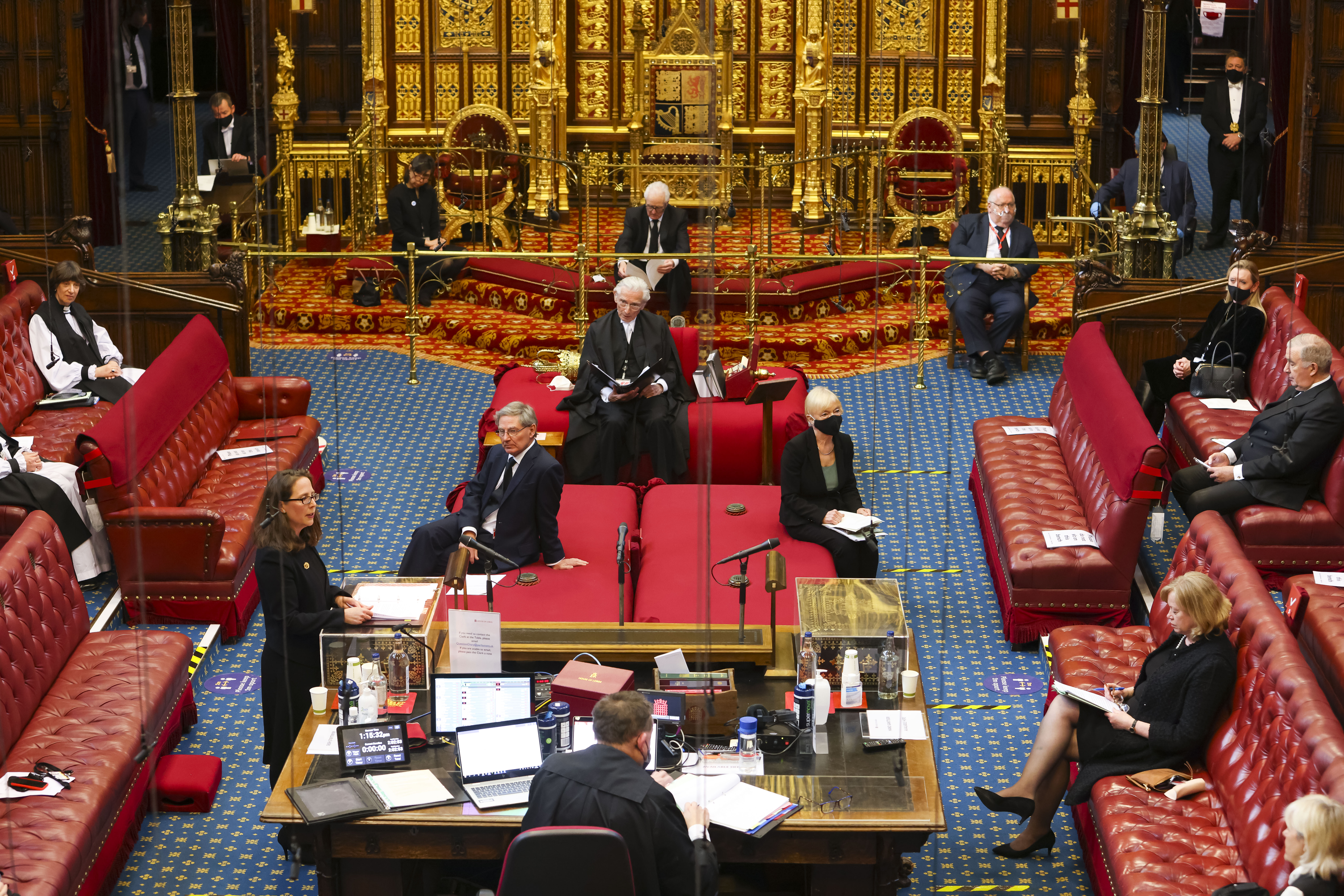
The Lords Chamber on 12 April 2021: Lord Fowler sits on the speaker's woolsack, with two other peers on the judges' woolsack in front.

The Woolsack is the seat of the Lord Speaker in the House of Lords, the Upper House of the Parliament of the United Kingdom. Before 2006, it was the seat of the Lord Chancellor, who presided as the presiding officer of the House. The Woolsack's status in the House was enshrined in the first standing orders in 1621.

== History ==
In the 14th century, King Edward III said that his Lord Chancellor, while in council, should sit on a wool bale, now known as "The Woolsack", to symbolise the central nature and great importance of the wool trade to the economy of England in the Middle Ages. Indeed, it was largely to protect the vital English wool trade routes with continental Europe that the Battle of Crécy was fought with the French in 1346.

In 1938, it was discovered that the Woolsack was stuffed with horsehair. When it was remade, it was re-stuffed with wool from the British Isles and 15 countries across the Commonwealth, supplied by the International Wool Secretariat, as a symbol of the country's trading routes overseas.

From the Middle Ages until 2006, the presiding officer in the House of Lords was the Lord Chancellor, and the Woolsack was usually mentioned in association with the office of Lord Chancellor. In July of that year, the function of Lord Speaker was split from that of Lord Chancellor under the Constitutional Reform Act 2005, with the former now sitting on the Woolsack.

Until 1949, Canada's Senate had a judges' woolsack. At the behest of Jean-François Pouliot, an MP from Quebec, who decried the use of a cushion on which the Supreme Court of Canada's judges had to sprawl "like urchins," the woolsack was eventually abolished and replaced with conventional chairs. The original woolsack is still extant.

== Ceremonial role ==
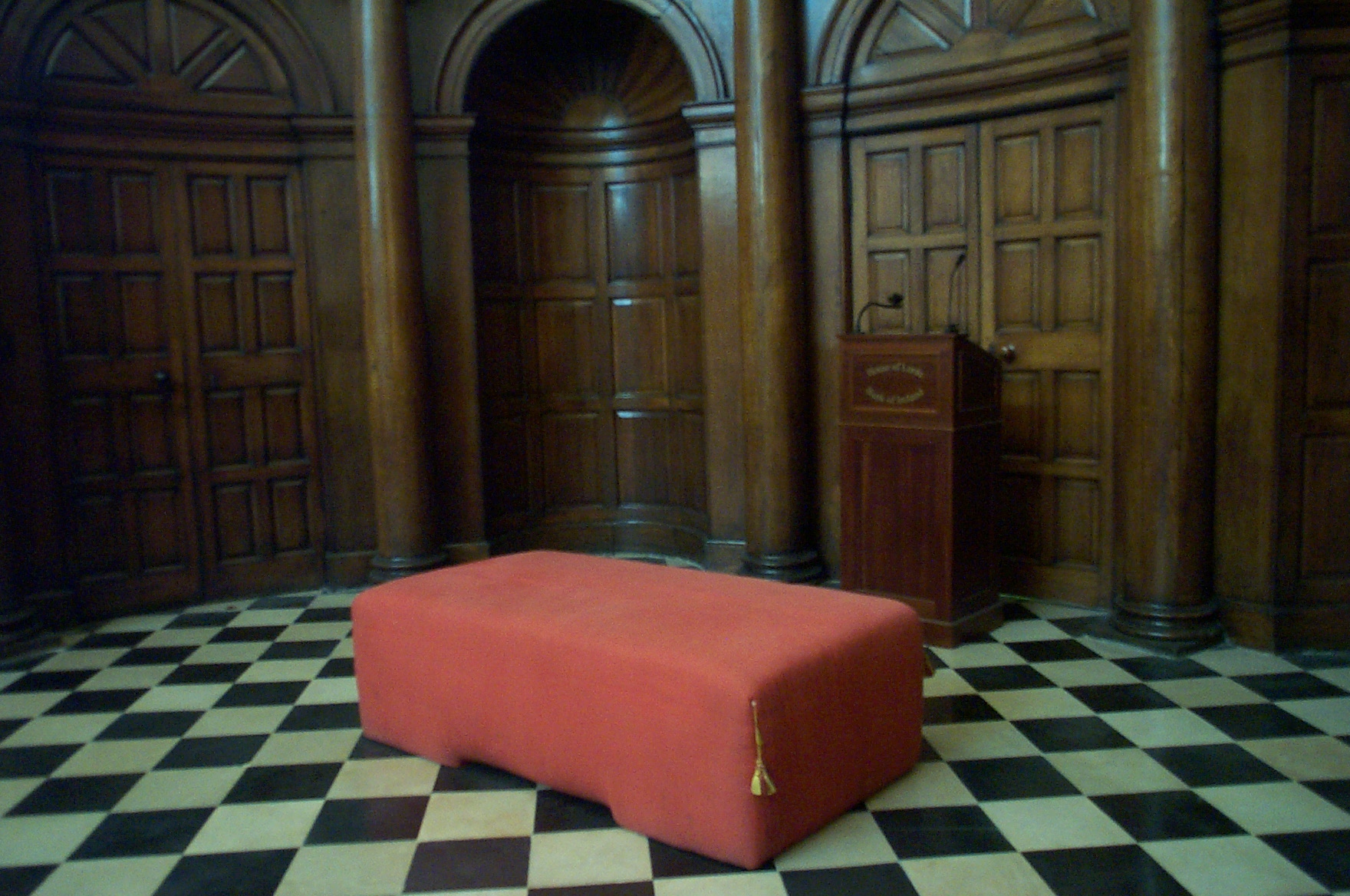
The woolsack in the former Irish House of Lords.

The Woolsack is a large, wool-stuffed cushion covered with a layer of red baize; it has neither a back nor arms, though, in the centre of the Woolsack, there is a back-rest. The four corners of the Woolsack are decorated with tassels, as inspired by the Tudor Rose, a motif used in the House of Lords. The Lords' Mace is placed on the rear part of the Woolsack whenever the House is in session, as a symbol of the Monarch's authority and presence. The mace is however not placed when the Monarch is in the House of Lords during the State Opening of Parliament. The mace is on loan from the Royal Collection.

The Lord Speaker may speak from the Woolsack when speaking in their capacity as Speaker of the House but, if seeking to debate, must deliver their remarks either from the left side of the Woolsack or from the normal seats of the Lords.

If a Deputy Speaker presides in the absence of the Lord Speaker, then that individual uses the Woolsack. However, when the House meets in the "Committee of the Whole", the Woolsack remains unoccupied, and the presiding officer, the chairman or deputy chairman, occupies a chair at the front of the table of the House.

To keep dignity and order, members of the House must not pass between the woolsack and any member who is speaking or between the woolsack and the clerk's table. If members wish to talk to each other while the House is sitting, they are not permitted to speak behind the woolsack and must retire to the Prince's Chamber.

The Woolsack in 2016, showing the ceremonial mace.

In front of the Woolsack are two even larger cushions known as the Judges' Woolsack. Any member of the House can sit on these two cushions during sessions. During the State Opening of Parliament, the Judges' Woolsack is occupied by the Lord Chief Justice, the Master of the Rolls, the President of the King's Bench Division, the President of the Family Division, the Chancellor of the High Court, the Lords Justices of Appeal and the Justices of the High Court, all of whom are summoned by writ to attend. The Justices of the Supreme Court of the United Kingdom, who are likewise summoned to attend the State Opening, are seated nearby, as their predecessors the Law Lords formerly sat on the benches as Lords Temporal.

== Mentions in popular culture ==
Gilbert and Sullivan's comic opera Iolanthe is partially set in the grounds of the Palace of Westminster, the meeting place of the House of Lords, and the Lords appear as the male chorus and a fictional Lord Chancellor is a main character. The entire house, as well as the Lord Chancellor, have become attracted to Phyllis, a ward of chancery. The Lord Chancellor laments that propriety would not allow him to marry his ward, no matter how strongly he may care for her. He describes his position this way: "Ah, my Lords, it is indeed painful to have to sit upon a woolsack which is stuffed with such thorns as these!"

In Uncommon Law by A. P. Herbert, the newly appointed Lady Chancellor finds the Woolsack uncomfortable and orders it replaced with a chair. Only after it has been removed does one of her fellow Law Lords mention that she should not have been sitting on the Woolsack when presiding on an appeal.
