= Lord Speaker =

Presiding officer of the UK House of Lords

- Logo used to represent the House of Lords

- Incumbent; The Lord Forsyth of Drumlean since 2 February 2026
- House of Lords
- Style: Lord Speaker (informal and within the house); Member's own peerage title
- Status: Presiding officer
- Nominator: Political parties
- Appointer: The House of Lords; approved and sworn in by the Sovereign
- Term length: Five years, renewable once
- Formation: 4 July 2006
- First holder: The Baroness Hayman
- Deputy: Senior Deputy Speaker
- Website: Official website

The Lord Speaker is the presiding officer, chairman and highest authority of the House of Lords in the Parliament of the United Kingdom. The office is analogous to the Speaker of the House of Commons: the Lord Speaker is elected by the members of the House of Lords and is expected to be politically impartial.

Until July 2006, the role of presiding officer in the House of Lords was undertaken by the Lord Chancellor. Under the Constitutional Reform Act 2005, the position of the speaker of the House of Lords (as it is termed in the Act) became a separate office, allowing the position to be held by someone other than the Lord Chancellor. The Lord Chancellor continued to act as speaker of the House of Lords in an interim period after the Act was passed while the House of Lords considered new arrangements about its speakership.

The current Lord Speaker is Michael Forsyth, Baron Forsyth of Drumlean. To date five people have held the role.

== History ==
In 2003, following the decision to disaggregate the roles performed by the Lord Chancellor (originally the aim of Tony Blair, the Prime Minister, was to abolish the office altogether), a select committee of the House of Lords looked into the proposed new office of its presiding officer, including the title for the elected speaker of the Lords. Following their recommendations, the new speaker was named "Lord Speaker", and the number of deputy speakers has fallen from 25 to twelve. "Lord Speaker" was chosen in part because it was already in use in the Standing Orders and the Companion.

== Functions ==
Video: A day in the life of the Lord Speaker (2013)

The main functions of the Lord Speaker are to take the chair in debates held in the chamber of the House of Lords, to advise the House of Lords on procedural rules, to take formal responsibility for security in the areas of the Palace of Westminster occupied by the House of Lords and its members, to speak for the House of Lords on ceremonial occasions, and to represent the House of Lords as its ambassador in the UK and overseas.

The role has less power than the Speaker of the House of Commons. The House of Lords is largely self-governing, and its presiding officer has traditionally taken a less active role in debates than the Speaker of the House of Commons. For example, unlike the Speaker, the Lord Speaker does not call the House to order, determine who is to speak when two individuals rise at the same time, rule on points of order, discipline members who violate the rules of the House, or select amendments to bills—all these functions are performed by the House of Lords as a whole. Similarly, whereas speeches in the House of Commons are addressed directly to the Speaker, those in the House of Lords are addressed to the House as a whole; i.e., speeches begin "My Lords" instead of "Mr Speaker". In practice, the only task of the Lord Speaker in the Chamber is to formally put the question before a vote, to announce the result of any vote, and to make certain announcements to the House (e.g., announcing the death of a member). Also, the Lord Speaker may end the adjournment of the House (or "recall" the House) during a public emergency.

The Lord Speaker has assumed most of the duties that the Lord Chancellor used to have in relation to his parliamentary role. However, the Lord Chancellor continues to hand the speech to the King during the State Opening of Parliament, representing the Government in doing so. When peers debated the creation of the office, there was debate as to whether the new speaker should have additional powers and responsibilities that the Lord Chancellor did not have, ultimately resolved in the negative.

The debate was renewed with proposals put forward by a Leader's Group (an ad hoc committee) led by Alastair Goodlad. The proposals include allowing the Lord Speaker, during Question Time and ministerial statements, to take on the role of advising the House which party should speak next when there is a dispute. The Leader of the House of Lords, a Government minister, currently handles this task. The decision of who should speak would ultimately remain with the House. A similar proposal was made by the committee that initially discussed the new office. A further option would allow the Speaker even more power during Question Time, but it was not recommended by the Leader's Group. The Group's report has yet to be approved.

Like the Speaker of the House of Commons, but unlike the Lord Chancellor (who was also a judge and a government minister), the Lord Speaker is expected to remain non-partisan whilst in office. On election, the Lord Speaker resigns the party whip or crossbench group and certain outside interests to concentrate on being an impartial presiding officer.

== Election ==
The Lord Speaker is elected for a maximum term of five years, and may serve a maximum of two terms. The election is conducted using the alternative vote method. Under amendments made on 3 May 2011, elections must be held by 15 July of the final year of a term, with the new term beginning on 1 September. When Helene Hayman, Baroness Hayman, was elected the first Lord Speaker, the Clerk of the Parliaments (the chief clerk of the House of Lords) announced the result, and the Lord Chamberlain announced the Queen's confirmation of the choice. The Lord Speaker thus elected then replaced the Lord Chancellor on the Woolsack.

== Perquisites and ceremony ==
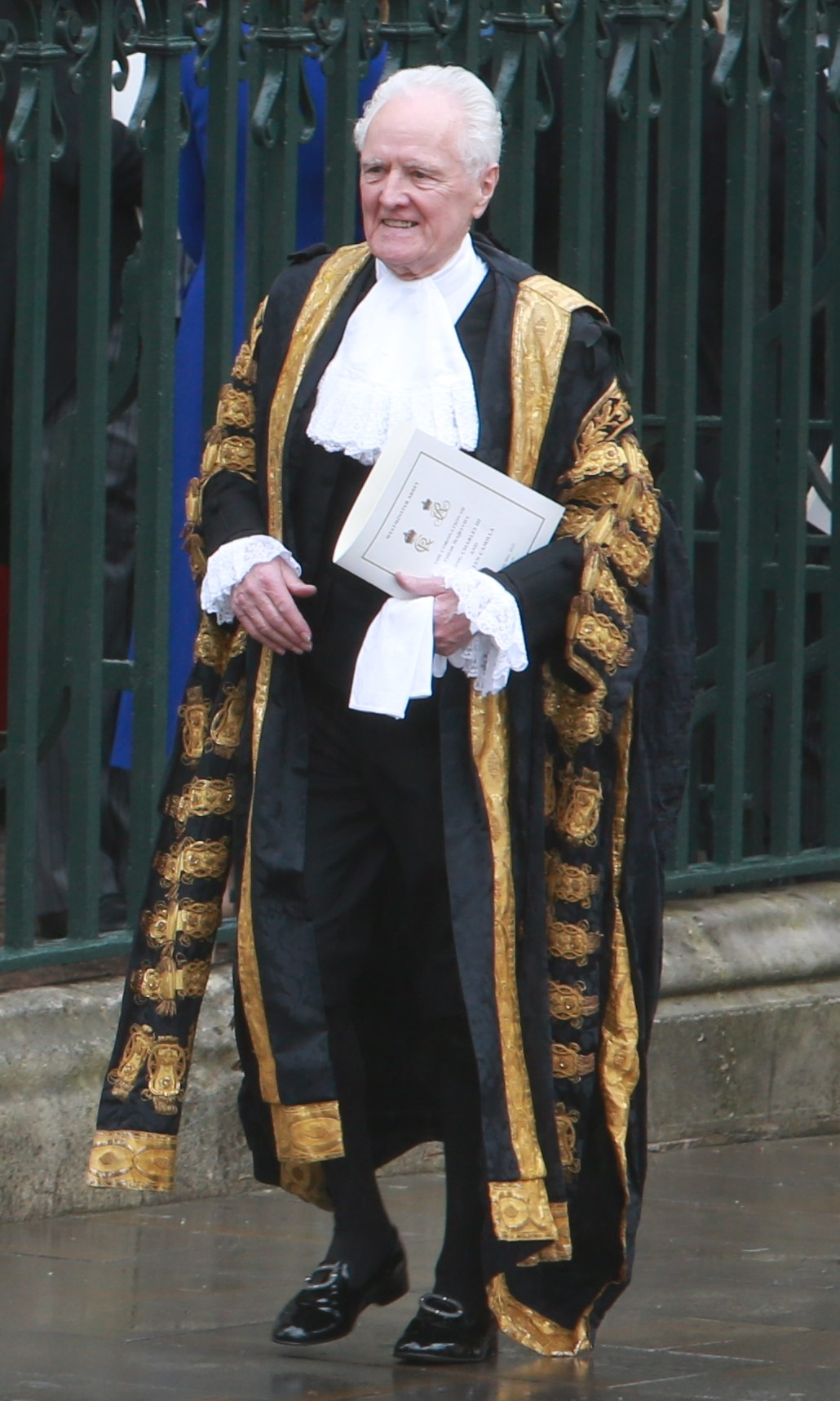
McFall in full state robes (but without wig) in 2023

By Royal Warrant on 4 July 2006, the Queen declared that the Lord Speaker would have rank and precedence immediately after the Speaker of the House of Commons. The Lord Speaker earns a salary of £104,360, less than the Speaker of the House of Commons, though the Speaker of the House of Commons' salary includes £81,932 paid for being an MP. The Lord Speaker, like the Speaker of the House of Commons, is entitled to a grace and favour apartment in the Parliamentary Estate.

Like the Lord Chancellor, the Lord Speaker wears court dress with a plain black silk gown while presiding over the House and a black silk damask and gold lace ceremonial gown on state occasions. To date holders of the office have chosen not to wear a wig, as the Lord Chancellor previously did, though they do have the option. When presiding over debates, the Lord Speaker sits on the Woolsack.

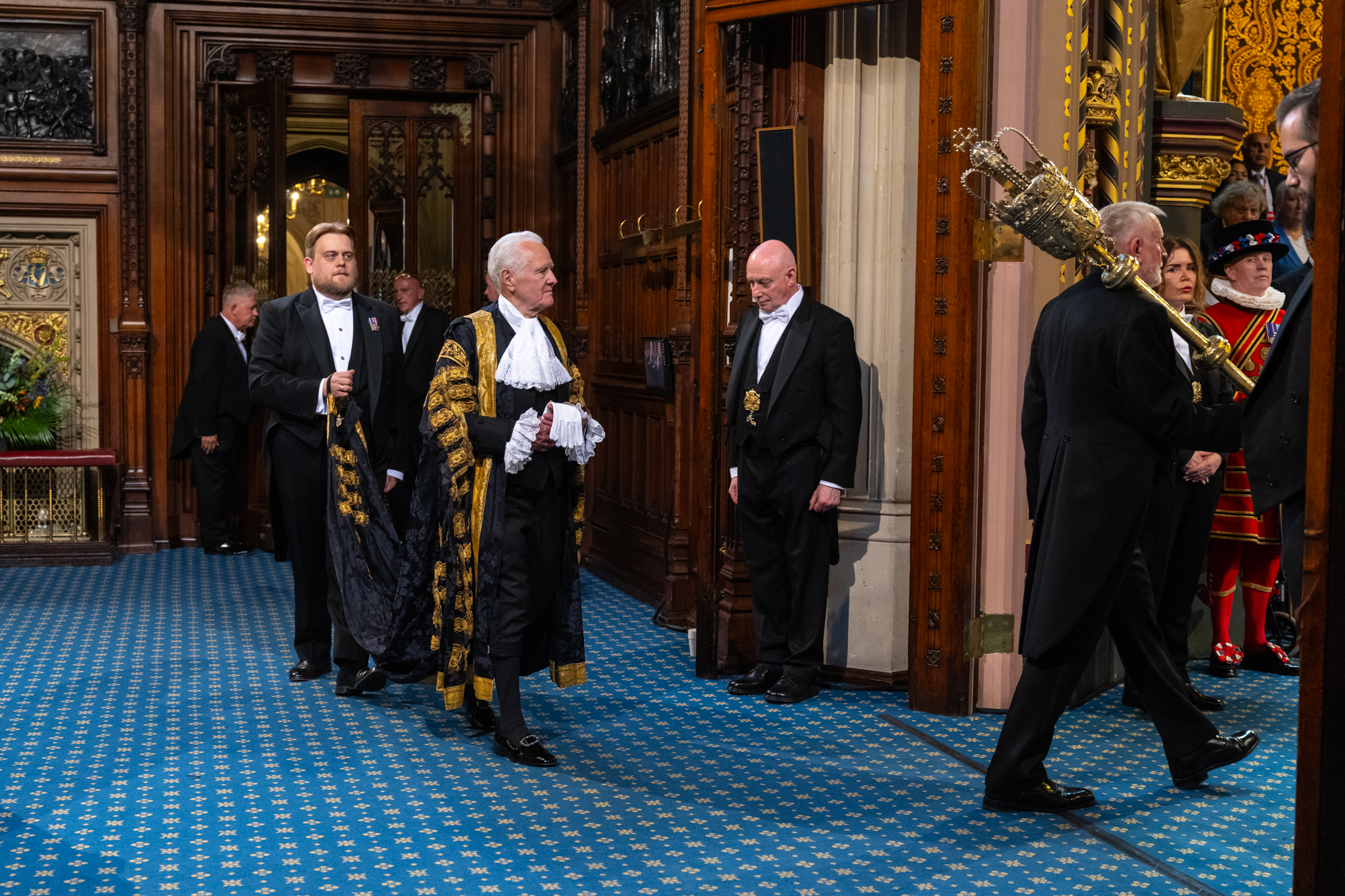
The Lord Speaker's procession prior to the State Opening of Parliament (2024).

Before each day's sitting of the House of Lords, the Lord Speaker forms part of a procession that marches from the Lord Speaker's residence to the Lords Chamber. The Lord Speaker is preceded by the Deputy Serjeant-at-Arms or Principal Doorkeeper of the House (who bears the Mace). The procession is joined by the Gentleman Usher of the Black Rod in the Prince's Chamber. Together, they move through the Not-content Lobby, entering the Chamber below the bar, and finish by walking up the Temporal (opposition) side toward the Woolsack. The Mace is placed on the Woolsack, where the Lord Speaker sits after a bishop has led the House in prayers.

When the Sovereign appoints Lords Commissioners to perform certain actions on his or her behalf (for example, to open or prorogue Parliament, or formally declare Royal Assent), the Lord Speaker is one of them. The other Lords Commissioners, by convention, are the Leader of the House (who has acted as the principal Commissioner since the Lord Chancellor's functions were transferred to the Lord Speaker), the leaders of the other two major parties in the Lords, and the Convenor of the Crossbenches.

New peers, upon being introduced in the House of Lords, shake hands with the Lord Speaker after taking the oath (or making affirmation).

== List of lord speakers ==
| Image | Name (birth–death) | Term of office Election | | Former party (Note: Party before election as Lord Speaker (or another office in the Lords). The Lord Speaker (among other officers) becomes unaffiliated from previous political party upon election.) | Ref |
|---|---|---|---|---|---|
| | Helene Hayman, Baroness Hayman (born 1949) | 4 July 2006 | 31 August 2011 | Labour | |
| | Helene Hayman, Baroness Hayman (born 1949) | 2006 | | Labour | |
| | Frances D'Souza, Baroness D'Souza (born 1944) | 1 September 2011 | 31 August 2016 | Crossbench | |
| | Frances D'Souza, Baroness D'Souza (born 1944) | 2011 | | Crossbench | |
| | Norman Fowler, Baron Fowler (born 1938) | 1 September 2016 | 30 April 2021 | Conservative | |
| | Norman Fowler, Baron Fowler (born 1938) | 2016 | | Conservative | |
| | John McFall, Baron McFall of Alcluith (born 1944) | 1 May 2021 | 1 February 2026 | Labour (Note: Non-affiliated since his appointment as Senior Deputy Speaker in 2016.) | |
| | John McFall, Baron McFall of Alcluith (born 1944) | 2021 | | Labour | |
| | Michael Forsyth, Baron Forsyth of Drumlean (born 1954) | 2 February 2026 | Incumbent | Conservative | |
| | Michael Forsyth, Baron Forsyth of Drumlean (born 1954) | 2026 | | Conservative | |

== See also ==
- List of lord chancellors and lord keepers
