= Frances D'Souza, Baroness D'Souza =

British scientist and politician (born 1944)

The Right Honourable The Baroness D'Souza CMG PC
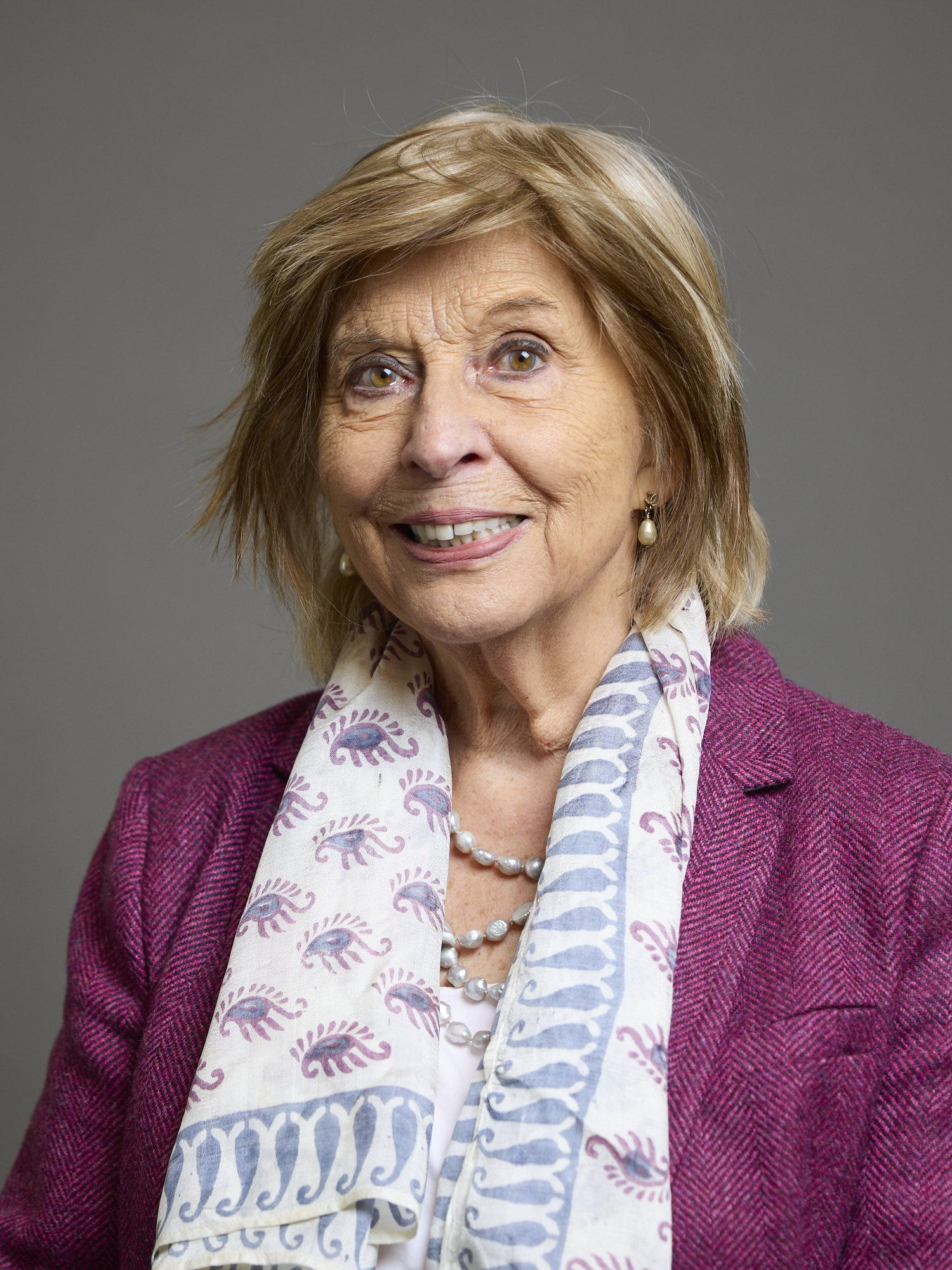
- Official portrait, 2024

Lord Speaker
- In office 1 September 2011 – 31 August 2016
- Monarch: Elizabeth II
- Deputy: The Lord Brabazon of Tara; The Lord Sewel; The Lord Laming
- Preceded by: The Baroness Hayman
- Succeeded by: The Lord Fowler

Convenor of the Crossbench Peers
- In office 6 November 2007 – 31 August 2011
- Preceded by: The Lord Williamson of Horton
- Succeeded by: The Lord Laming

Member of the House of Lords
- Lord Temporal
- Life peerage 1 July 2004

Personal details
- Born: Frances Gertrude Claire Russell; 18 April 1944 (age 82) Sussex, England
- Party: Crossbench
- Other political affiliations: None (as Lord Speaker; 2011–2016)
- Spouses: Stanislaus D'Souza (m. 1959; div. 1974) (m. 2003; died 2011) Martin Griffiths (m. 1985; div. 1994)
- Children: 2 (including Christa)
- Education: University College London; Lady Margaret Hall, Oxford
- Committees: Procedure Committee (2005–present); House (2007–present); Selection; Privileges; Liaison; Administration and Works (2007–2011)

Frances Gertrude Claire D'Souza, Baroness D'Souza, CMG, PC (née Russell; born 18 April 1944) is a British scientist and politician. She held the office of Lord Speaker from 1 September 2011 to 31 August 2016.

== Early life, education and early career ==
Frances Gertrude Claire Russell, the daughter of Robert Anthony Gilbert and Pauline (née Parmet) Russell, was educated at St Mary's School, Princethorpe, and went to University College London to read anthropology, graduating BSc in 1970. She subsequently undertook further study at Lady Margaret Hall, Oxford, obtaining the degree of Doctor of Philosophy (DPhil) in 1976.

She worked for the Nuffield Institute of Brain Chemistry and Human Nutrition from 1973 to 1977, Oxford Polytechnic (now Oxford Brookes University) from 1977 to 1980, and was an independent research consultant for the United Nations from 1985 to 1988. From 1989 to 2002, she was the director of the human rights organization Article 19. As its representative she supported the Musa Anter peace train to Diyarbakır, which aimed for peace in Kurdistan.

== Personal life ==
In 1959, at the age of 15, she married Stanislaus Joseph D'Souza, the son of a civil servant in the Indian government. They had two daughters and divorced in 1974. From 1985 to 1994, she was married to Martin Griffiths. She was remarried to Stanislaus from 2003 until his death in 2011. Their elder daughter is the journalist Christa D'Souza.

== Honours ==
D'Souza was appointed a Companion of the Order of St Michael and St George (CMG) in the 1999 New Year Honours for services to human rights.

== House of Lords ==
D'Souza was created a Lord Temporal as Baroness D'Souza, of Wychwood in the County of Oxfordshire, on 1 July 2004. She sat as a crossbencher in the House of Lords, where she was the Convenor of the Crossbench Peers from 2007 to 2011 with attendance "well above average".

On 13 July 2011, D'Souza was elected Lord Speaker of the House of Lords and began her new role in September 2011.

In December 2015, the results of a Freedom of Information request revealed that D'Souza spent £230 to keep a chauffeured car waiting while she watched a performance of Benjamin Britten's Gloriana with the chairman of the Federation Council of Russia. The journey was just a mile from the Houses of Parliament. She spent £270 holding a car for four and a half hours while she had lunch with the Japanese ambassador in central London. It was also revealed that a 10-day official trip to Japan, Hong Kong and Taiwan in the autumn of last year cost nearly £26,000, and that she had spent £4,000 across a five-year period on fresh flowers for her office at the taxpayer's expense.

D'Souza's term as Lord Speaker ended on 31 August 2016. After returning to the crossbenches she called for urgent action to address the growing size of the House of Lords, including limits on the Prime Minister's patronage power.

In October 2025, Baroness D'Souza was suspended from the House of Lords for eight weeks after the Conduct Committee upheld a recommendation that she had breached the Code of Conduct by using her position to seek improper influence over the Commissioner of Police of the Metropolis, Sir Mark Rowley, regarding multiple speeding fines she had received. The suspension was imposed under the House of Lords (Expulsion and Suspension) Act 2015, a piece of reform legislation that D'Souza had actively supported as Lord Speaker earlier that year amid the scandal involving Lord Sewel, citing it in a public commentary as essential to ensure "the Lords must never be sullied by errant peers again" and as key evidence of the chamber's ongoing modernization.

Parliament of the United Kingdom
Preceded by The Lord Williamson of Horton	Convenor of the Crossbench Peers; 2007–2011	Succeeded by The Lord Laming
Preceded by The Baroness Hayman	Lord Speaker; 2011–2016	Succeeded by The Lord Fowler
