= Crossbencher =

Independent or minor party member of a legislature

A crossbencher is a minor party or independent member of some legislatures, such as the Parliament of Australia. In the British House of Lords the term refers to members of the parliamentary group of politically non-aligned peers. They take their name from the crossbenches, between and perpendicular to the government and opposition benches, where crossbenchers sit in the chamber.

== United Kingdom ==
Crossbench
- House of Lords: 154 / 796

Crossbench members of the British House of Lords are not aligned to any particular party. Until 2009, these included the Law Lords appointed under the Appellate Jurisdiction Act 1876. In addition, former Speakers of the House of Commons (such as Lord Martin of Springburn and Baroness Boothroyd) and former Lord Speakers of the House of Lords (such as Baroness Hayman and Baroness D'Souza), who by convention are not aligned with any party, also sit as crossbenchers. There are also some non-affiliated members of the House of Lords who are not part of the crossbencher group; this includes some officers, such as the Lord Speaker, and others who are associated with a party but have had the whip withdrawn. Although non-affiliated members, and members of small parties, sometimes physically sit on the crossbenches, they are not members of the crossbench parliamentary group.

An "increasing number" of crossbenchers have been created peers for non-political reasons. Since its establishment in May 2000, the House of Lords Appointments Commission has nominated a total of 67 non-party-political life peers who joined the House of Lords as crossbenchers. As of 31 October 2026, there are 154 crossbenchers, making up approximately 19 per cent of the sitting members in the House of Lords. The Crossbench is typically the third-largest peerage group after the Conservative and Labour benches. From April 2007 to 2009, the number of crossbenchers was higher than the number of Conservative peers for the first time.

Although the Lords Spiritual (archbishops and senior bishops of the Church of England) also have no party affiliation, they are not considered crossbenchers and do not sit on the crossbenches, their seats being on the Government side of the Lords Chamber.

=== Convenor ===
The crossbenchers do not take a collective position on issues, and so have no whips; however, they do elect from among themselves a convenor for administrative purposes, and to keep them up to date with the business of the House. The current convenor is Charles Hay, 16th Earl of Kinnoull, who took the office in April 2023. While convenors are not part of the "usual channels" (i.e. the party whips who decide the business of the House), they have been included in their discussions in recent years.

The following have served as Convenor of the Crossbenchers:

- 1968–1974: William Strang, 1st Baron Strang
- 1974–1995: Audrey Hylton-Foster, Baroness Hylton-Foster
- 1995–1999: Bernard Weatherill, Baron Weatherill (Alternate Convenor 1993–1995)
- 1999–2004: David Craig, Baron Craig of Radley
- 2004–2007: David Williamson, Baron Williamson of Horton
- 2007–2011: Frances D'Souza, Baroness D'Souza
- 2011–2015: Herbert Laming, Baron Laming
- 2015–2019: David Hope, Baron Hope of Craighead
- 2019–2023: Igor Judge, Baron Judge
- 2023–present: Charles Hay, 16th Earl of Kinnoull

== Australia ==
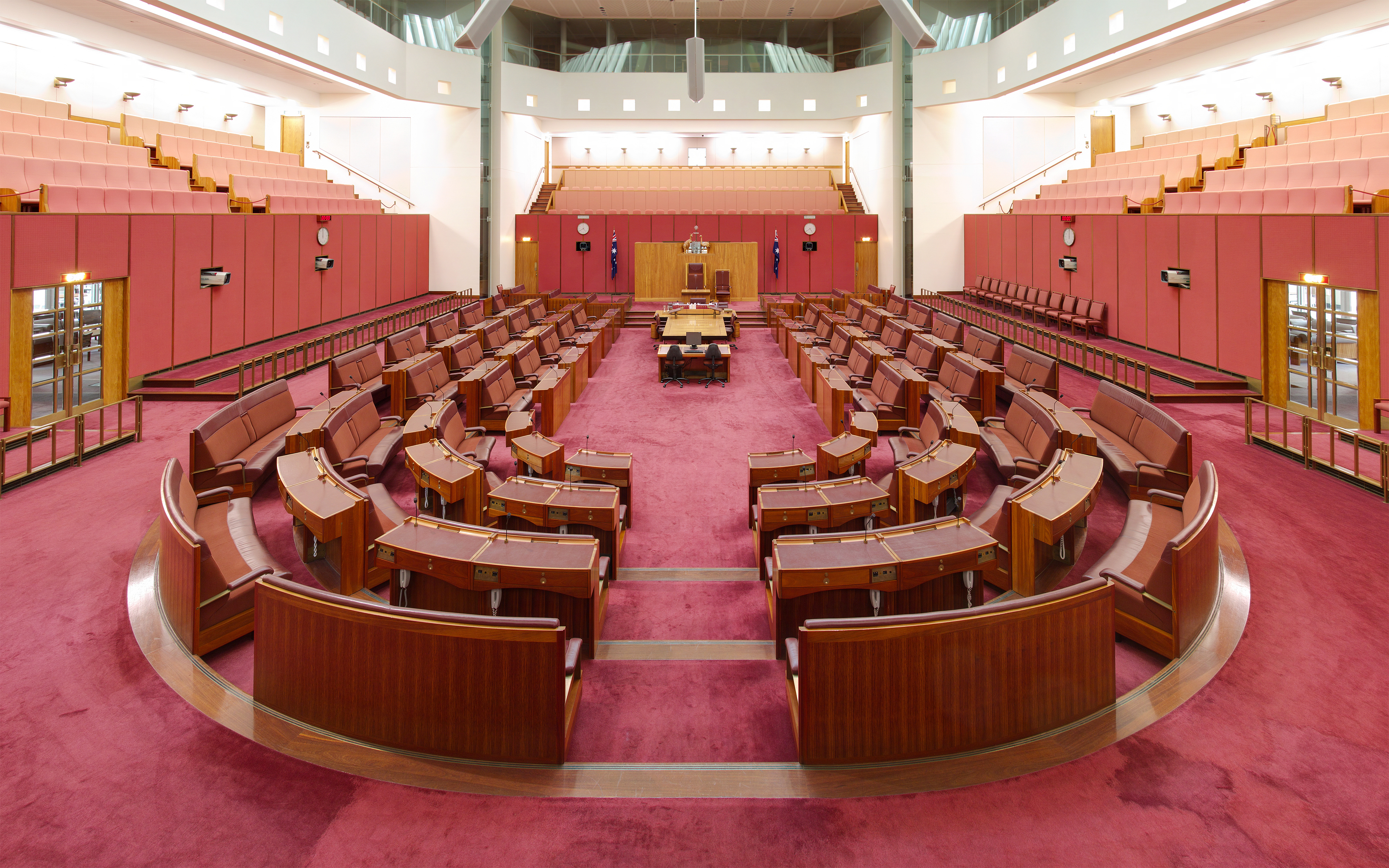
The Australian Senate. Crossbenchers sit in the curved seats between the two sides.

In the federal Parliament of Australia as well as the parliaments of the Australian states and territories, the term crossbencher refers to any minor party and independent members of parliament. More precisely, a crossbencher is any member who is not part of the governing party or parties, nor the party or parties forming what is known as the official opposition, sometimes known simply as the opposition. Unlike the United Kingdom, the term is used by both the lower and upper houses of each parliament (where applicable), who sit on the crossbenches between the government and opposition benches.

Federal elections in the early 21st century have seen an increase in the size and power of the crossbench in both houses of parliament. The Australian Parliament as elected at the 2010 election was the first hung parliament in the House of Representatives since the election of 1940, with the Australian Labor Party and the Coalition winning 72 seats each of 150 total. Six crossbenchers held the balance of power: Greens MP Adam Bandt and independent MP Andrew Wilkie, Rob Oakeshott and Tony Windsor declared their support for Labor on confidence and supply, independent MP Bob Katter and National Party of Western Australia MP Tony Crook declared their support for the Coalition on confidence and supply. The resulting 76–74 margin entitled Labor to form a minority government.

The Australian senate, which uses the single transferable vote form of proportional representation to elect its 76-seat chamber, frequently has enough Senators on the crossbench that the governing party has to negotiate with it to get legislation passed. The 2 July 2016 double dissolution election, for example resulted in a chamber with the Liberal/National Coalition having 30 seats, the Australian Labor Party with 26 seats, the Greens with nine seats, One Nation with four seats and the Nick Xenophon Team with three seats. The other four seats were each won by Derryn Hinch, the Liberal Democratic Party, Family First, and Jacqui Lambie. The number of crossbenchers increased by two to a record 20 (all but the ones of the Liberal/National coalition and the ALP: 9+4+3+4). The Liberal/National Coalition government required at least nine additional votes to reach a senate majority.

Generally, senators broadly aligned with the Coalition (centre-right to right-wing senators and parties) sit on the same side of the crossbench as the Coalition benches, while those more aligned with Labor (such as centre-left to left-wing parties) sit on the same side of the crossbench as the Labor benches. This tends not to be the case in the House of Representatives, both due to the different electoral system, which means fewer crossbenchers are elected, and the fact that the official government and opposition frontbenches extend across the inner rim of the entire hemicycle.

== New Zealand ==
In the New Zealand House of Representatives, MPs from parties that are not openly aligned with either the government or the official opposition (such as those belonging to New Zealand First from 2011 to 2017) are sometimes referred to as crossbenchers, but those who support the government in confidence and supply agreements are regarded as part of the government and sit on the government benches, and often receive official roles as ministers outside the cabinet or as parliamentary under-secretaries. From 2008 to 2017, ACT New Zealand, Te Pāti Māori and United Future MPs supported the minority National Party government. As such, these MPs were not considered to be crossbenchers or part of the opposition, as they were represented within the government.

== Similar concepts in Canada ==
The term "crossbencher" is generally not used for the federal Parliament of Canada or any of the provincial or territorial legislatures. Instead, any party that is not the governing party is an "opposition party", with the largest of these designated the official opposition (and their leader is designated Leader of the Opposition). Opposition parties other than the official opposition are typically called "third parties". Third parties that hold a certain threshold of seats are granted official party status. In 2022 the official opposition is the Conservatives; two third parties have official party status in the House of Commons, the Bloc Québécois and the NDP; and Green Party is an opposition party without official party status.

Beginning in 2016, multiple non-partisan caucuses which fulfill a similar purpose as crossbenchers were formed in the Senate of Canada. The first, the Independent Senators Group (ISG), was created partly as a response to Prime Minister Justin Trudeau's decision to appoint more non-partisan Senators. Similar to crossbenchers in the UK, the ISG chooses its own leader and does not use a whipping system. In December 2016, the Senate began to officially recognise the ISG and provide it with funding. Two additional groups were established in 2019: the Canadian Senators Group (which primarily focuses on regional issues) and the Progressive Senate Group (formed by members of the defunct Senate Liberal Caucus). The Canadian Senate in 2022 generally aspires towards non-partisanship. Non-affiliated members outnumber members affiliated with a political party, and the Liberal Caucus in the Senate was dissolved in 2019.

== See also ==
- Backbencher
- Frontbencher
- Category:Crossbench peers
- Third party
