= Helene Hayman, Baroness Hayman =

British politician (born 1949)

The Right Honourable The Baroness Hayman GBE PC
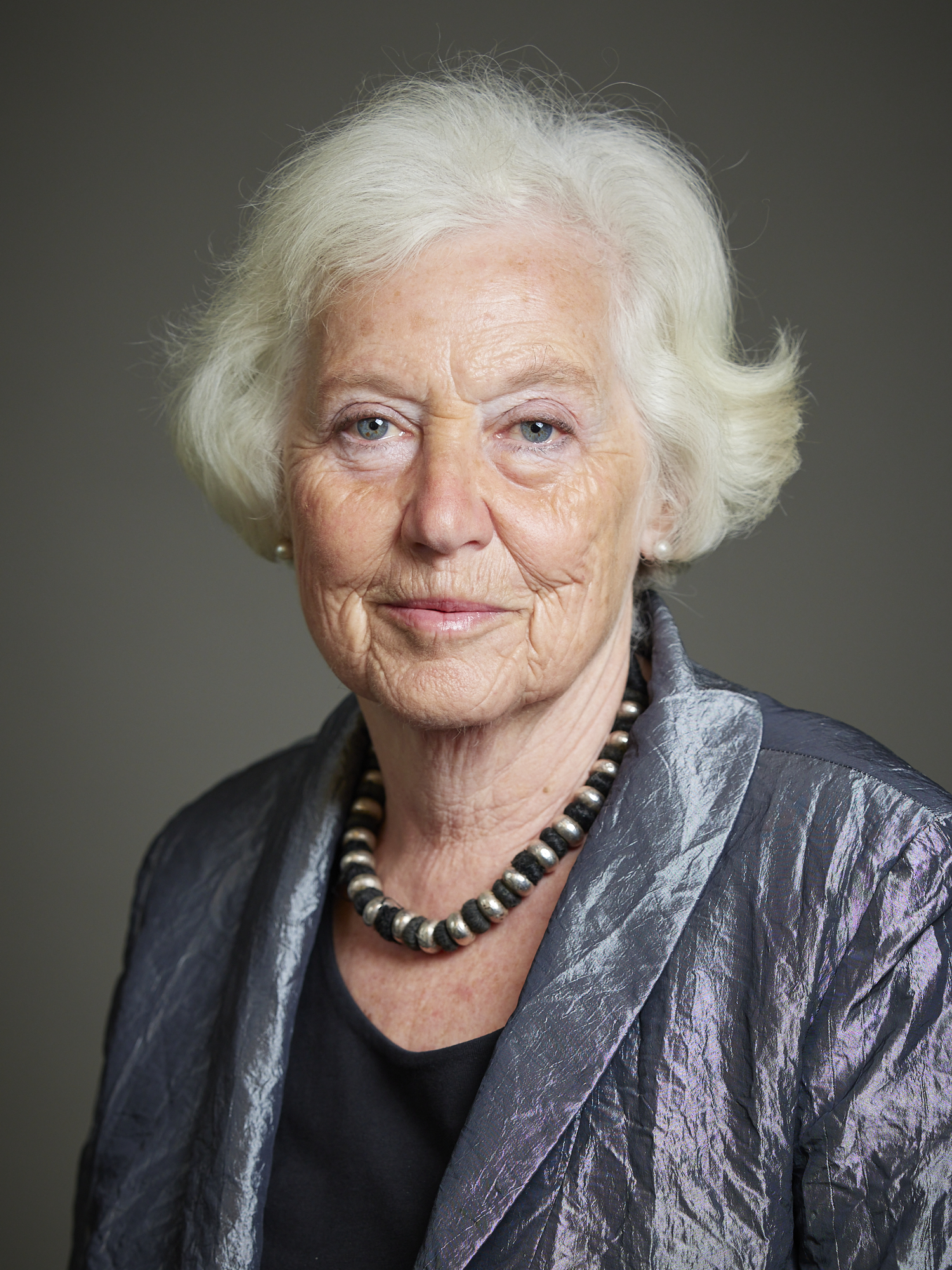
- Official portrait, 2023

Lord Speaker
- In office 4 July 2006 – 31 August 2011
- Monarch: Elizabeth II
- Preceded by: The Lord Falconer of Thoroton (as Lord Chancellor)
- Succeeded by: The Baroness D'Souza

Minister of State for Agriculture, Fisheries and Food
- In office 29 July 1999 – 7 June 2001
- Monarch: Elizabeth II
- Prime Minister: Tony Blair
- Preceded by: The Lord Donoughue
- Succeeded by: Office abolished

Parliamentary Under-Secretary of State for Health
- In office 28 July 1998 – 29 July 1999
- Monarch: Elizabeth II
- Prime Minister: Tony Blair
- Preceded by: The Baroness Jay of Paddington
- Succeeded by: Gisela Stuart

Parliamentary Under-Secretary of State for Roads
- In office 6 May 1997 – 28 July 1998
- Monarch: Elizabeth II
- Prime Minister: Tony Blair
- Preceded by: The Viscount Goschen
- Succeeded by: The Lord Whitty

Member of the House of Lords
- Lord Temporal
- Life peerage 2 January 1996

Member of Parliament for Welwyn and Hatfield
- In office 10 October 1974 – 7 April 1979
- Preceded by: Lord Balniel
- Succeeded by: Christopher Murphy

Personal details
- Born: Helene Valerie Middleweek; 26 March 1949 (age 77)
- Party: Crossbench
- Other political affiliations: Labour (until 2006)
- Spouse: Martin Heathcote Hayman (m. 1974)
- Children: 4
- Committees: Procedure Committee (2006–11); House Committee (2006–11)

Helene Valerie Hayman, Baroness Hayman, GBE, PC (née Middleweek; born 26 March 1949) is a British politician who was Lord Speaker of the House of Lords in the Parliament of the United Kingdom. As a member of the Labour Party she was a Member of Parliament from 1974 to 1979. When she became an MP at age 25, she was the youngest MP of the 1974–79 Parliament. Hayman became a life peer in 1996.

Outside politics, she has been involved in health issues, serving on medical ethics committees and the governing bodies of bodies in the National Health Service and health charities. In 2006, she won the inaugural election for the newly created position of Lord Speaker.

== Early life, education and early career ==
The daughter of Maurice (a dentist) and Maude Middleweek, Hayman attended Wolverhampton Girls' High School and read law at Newnham College, Cambridge, graduating in 1969; she was President of the Cambridge Union Society in 1969. She worked for Shelter from 1969 to 1971, and for the Social Services Department at the London Borough of Camden from 1971 to 1974, when she was named Deputy Director of the National Council for One-Parent Families.

== Personal life ==
She married Martin Heathcote Hayman (born 20 December 1942) in 1974; they have four sons.

== Political career ==
She participated on William F. Buckley's Firing Line television programs in January 1972 as a member of a panel discussing "The Irish Problem" and featuring then-MP Bernadette Devlin McAliskey, and on 24 July 1973 in an episode discussing whether the Apollo program had been worth it, and again on the 20 August 1973 episode with Malcolm Muggeridge on the theme "Has America Had It?". In February 1973 she was one of three commenters on an episode of Firing Line which featured Germaine Greer.

She contested the Wolverhampton South West constituency in the February 1974 election. She was elected as the Member of Parliament for Welwyn and Hatfield in the October 1974 general election. On her election, she was the youngest member of the House of Commons, remaining the "Baby of the House" until the by-election victory of Andrew MacKay in 1977. She was the first woman to breastfeed at Westminster. She lost her seat, a marginal, to the Conservative Christopher Murphy at the 1979 general election.

She was a member of the Bloomsbury Health Authority (later Bloomsbury and Islington Health Authority) from 1985 to 1992, and its Vice-Chair from 1988 onwards. She served on the ethics committees of the Royal College of Gynaecologists from 1982 to 1997, and of the University College London and University College Hospital from 1987 to 1997. From 1992 to 1997, she was a member of the Council of University College, London, and chair of Whittington Hospital NHS Trust.

Hayman was made a life peer on 2 January 1996, and took the title Baroness Hayman, of Dartmouth Park in the London Borough of Camden. After the Labour Party won the 1997 general election, she served as a junior minister in the Department for Environment, Transport and the Regions and the Department of Health, before being appointed Minister of State at the Ministry of Agriculture, Fisheries and Food in July 1999.

She became a member of the Privy Council in 2001, but left political office the same year to become chairman of Cancer Research UK (2001–2005). She became chair of the Human Tissue Authority in 2005. She was a Trustee of the Royal Botanic Gardens, Kew (2002–2006) and of the Tropical Health and Education Trust (2005–2006). She was a member of the Human Fertilisation and Embryology Authority in 2005–2006. She was a member of the Lords Select Committee on the Assisted Dying for the Terminally Ill Bill, 2004–2005, and of the Lords Constitution Committee, 2005–2006.

== Lord Speaker ==
In May 2006, after the position of Speaker in the House of Lords was separated from the office of Lord Chancellor as part of the reforms under the Constitutional Reform Act 2005, she was one of nine candidates to be put forward for the new role of Lord Speaker. She was nominated as a candidate by Baroness Symons of Vernham Dean and seconded by Lord Walton of Detchant. Her narrow victory in the election was announced on 4 July 2006 and she became the first ever Lord Speaker. On her election, Lord McNally, the Liberal Democrat leader in the House of Lords, called her "a Julie Andrews-figure of British politics". Like the Speaker in the House of Commons, but unlike the Lord Chancellor who was also a judge and a government minister, the Lord Speaker resigns party membership and outside interests to concentrate on being an impartial presiding officer.

On 2 March 2011, Hayman gave a lecture to the Mile End Group in the Attlee Suite of Portcullis House. This was the third in a lecture series to commemorate the Parliament Act 1911. On 9 May 2011, Hayman announced that she would not seek re-election for a second term as Lord Speaker; her successor was Baroness D'Souza.

== Honours and awards ==
- Dame Grand Cross of the Order of the British Empire (GBE) in the 2012 New Year Honours for services to the House of Lords.
- On 21 September 2010: copy of the key of the city of Tirana on a visit to Albania at the invitation of the Speaker of the Albanian Parliament.
- Honorary Fellow, Newnham College, Cambridge

== See also ==
- List of residents of Wolverhampton

Parliament of the United Kingdom
Preceded by Lord Balniel	Member of Parliament for Welwyn and Hatfield; October 1974 – 1979	Succeeded by Christopher Murphy
Preceded by The Lord Falconer of Thoroton as Lord Chancellor	Lord Speaker; 2006–2011	Succeeded by The Baroness D'Souza
Honorary titles
Preceded by Dafydd Elis-Thomas	Baby of the House of Commons; 1974–1977	Succeeded by Andrew MacKay
