= Usual channels =

British political term

"Usual channels" is a term used in British politics to describe the relationship between the whips and leadership of the Government and the Opposition. Essentially, this is to obtain co-operation between the two parties, in order to ensure as much business as possible can be dealt with in each parliamentary session.

Negotiations in the "usual channels" take place daily, with the key roles being played by civil servants such as the Principal Private Secretary to the Chief Whip. They determine how the time in each house of Parliament is spent and, prior to the 2010 general election, they decided the composition and the chair of select committees.

In 2002, the Hansard Society published a report entitled Opening Up The Usual Channels, which concluded that the Commons would benefit from greater transparency if the system were to be replaced by a formal "business committee" as used in other legislatures. In 2006, The Constitution Unit at UCL made similar recommendations.

In 2009, following the parliamentary expenses scandal, a temporary 'Reform of the House of Commons' select committee, the Wright Committee, was established to consider issues of House of Commons reform. The recommendations in their report included the establishment of a backbench business committee and the election of select committee chairs, which would fundamentally change the way the usual channels work.

Following the general election in May 2010, a Backbench Business Committee was established in June, which is responsible for determining the business of the House of Commons for one day each week. Also, for the first time, chairs of select committees were elected by secret ballot by the whole house, while select committee members were elected internally within each party group.

== Sources ==
- BBC News: Behind the scenes at Westminster 11 December 2002
