= Landmark Theatres =

American indie movie theater chain

Landmark Theatre Corporation
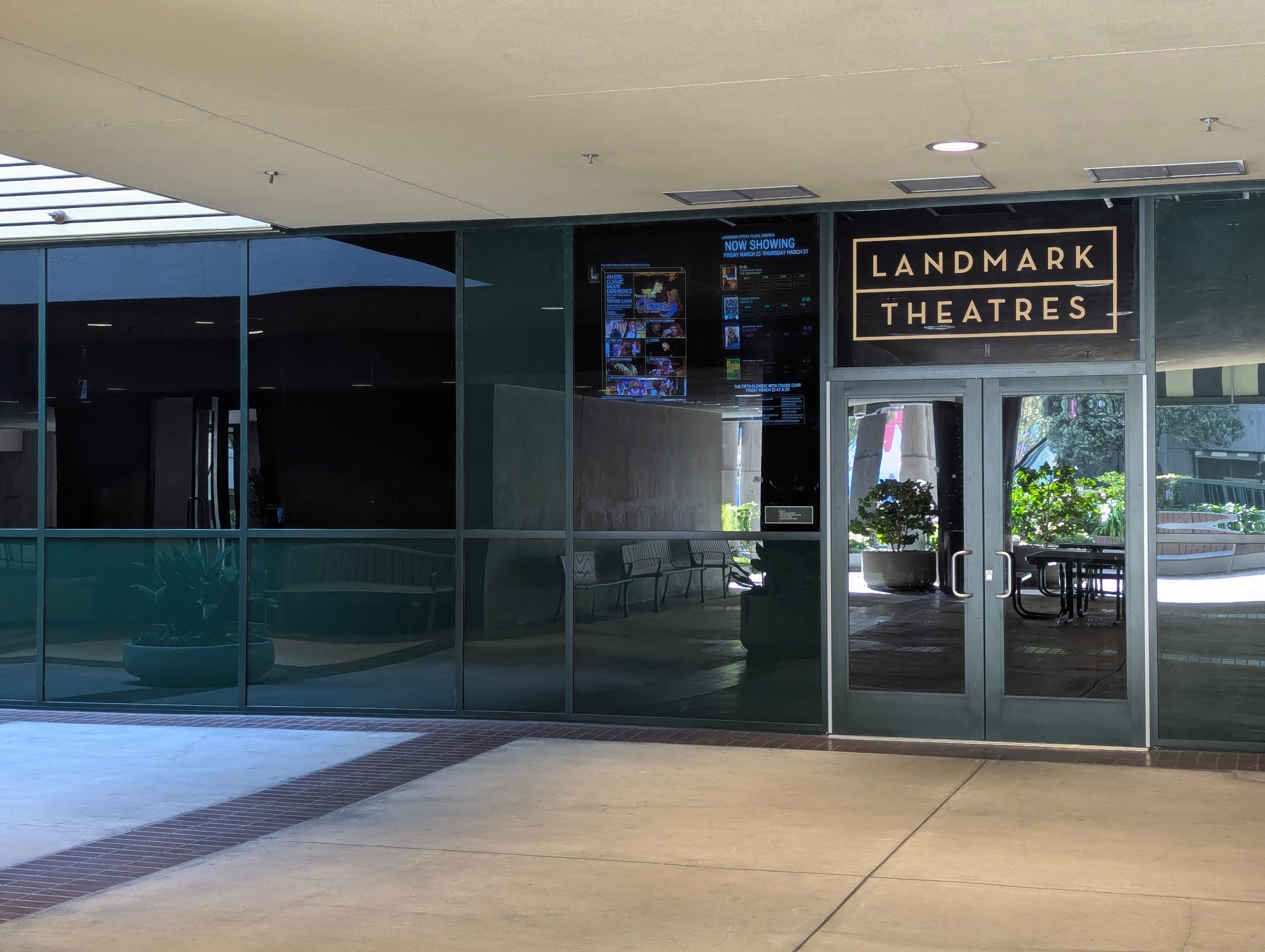
- Landmark Opera Plaza Cinema (2025)
- Type: Private
- Industry: Entertainment
- Predecessor: Parallax Theatres
- Founded: 1974; 52 years ago
- Founder: Kim Jorgensen
- Headquarters: Los Angeles, California
- Number of locations: 35 theatres (2022)
- Area served: United States
- Key people: Bill Banowsky (Co-CEO); Ted Mundorff (Co-CEO)
- Revenue: US$124.6 million (2023)
- Owner: Heritage Entertainment (1989–1990); The Samuel Goldwyn Company (1990–1998); Silver Cinemas (1998–2003); 2929 Entertainment (2003–2018); Cohen Media Group (2018–present)
- Number of employees: 900 (2023)
- Subsidiaries: Silver Cinemas
- Website: www.landmarktheatres.com

Landmark Theatres is a movie theatre chain founded in 1974 in the United States. It was formerly dedicated to exhibiting and marketing independent and foreign films. Landmark consists of 34 theatres with 176 screens in 24 markets. Landmark Theatres is part of Cohen Media Group (as of 2018).

== History ==
=== 1970s ===
Landmark Theatre Corporation began as Parallax Theatres and was founded in 1974 by Kim Jorgensen with the opening of the Nuart Theatre in Los Angeles, the Sherman in Sherman Oaks, the Rialto in South Pasadena, and the Ken in San Diego. Steve Gilula and Gary Meyer became partners in 1976, as the chain expanded as Landmark.

In 1976, the River Oaks Theatre in Houston (which originally opened in 1939) and the single-screen Oriental Theatre in Milwaukee were acquired. The Oriental originally opened in July 1927 and was the only standard movie palace ever built to incorporate East Indian décor. The Harvard Exit Theatre in Seattle was acquired in 1979. The film programming in Landmark Theatres was a mix of repertory/revival double-features that changed daily. This mix also included smaller independent and foreign films and allowed Landmark to grow into the largest repertory/revival movie-theater circuit in the nation by the end of that decade.

=== 1980s ===
In the early 1980s, Landmark reoriented most of their theatres to exhibit first-run specialized, foreign, and re-released classics on longer, open-ended runs. Larger single screens were converted into two or three-screen theatres while preserving the external architecture.

In 1981, Landmark acquired the Neptune Theatre in Seattle. The following year, Landmark merged with Movie, Inc. of Santa Fe, NM, which also focused on showcasing foreign, alternative, and classic films. In 1988, The Oriental Theatre in Milwaukee underwent a conversion into a triplex by adding two theaters underneath the balcony, while preserving the original artwork of the main auditorium. Additionally, Landmark opened Canal Place Cinema (4 screens) on the edge of New Orleans' French Quarter, marking its first new build. In 1989, Landmark merged with the Seven Gables theater circuit from Seattle and Portland. Subsequently, Heritage Entertainment acquired Landmark.

=== 1990s ===
In the early 1990s, Landmark began renovations of its historic buildings and began developing new multiplex theaters of its own. The new locations included the Westside Pavilion in Los Angeles, the Embarcadero in San Francisco's Financial District, the Embassy in Waltham near Boston, the Plaza Frontenac in St. Louis, the Century Center in Chicago, and the Renaissance in Highland Park near Chicago. In 1991, the Clay Theatre of San Francisco was purchased. In 1998, Landmark was acquired by Silver Cinemas and began operating a small group of discount theaters including the Bell Road, the Superstition, The Yukon, the Golden Triangle, the Macomb, the Joliet, the Budget South, the East Town Green Bay, the Market Square and the Poughkeepsie theaters. Landmark was acquired by the Samuel Goldwyn Company in 1990.

=== 2000s ===
Landmark was brought out of Silver Cinemas' bankruptcy by Oaktree Capital, allowing the construction and opening of the Sunshine, Bethesda Row and E Street Cinemas. On September 24, 2003, Landmark was acquired by Todd Wagner and Mark Cuban's 2929 Entertainment, the Magnolia Pictures exhibition wing folded into Landmark Theatres. Digital Cinema was introduced.

In 2005, Landmark was the first exhibition circuit to deploy Sony 4K cinema; in-theater digital signage was introduced. In Indianapolis, Landmark opened the Keystone Art Cinema & Indie Lounge. The cinema had 7 auditoriums; the lounge featured plasma televisions and allowed all moviegoers to bring their drinks into the auditoriums. And, the Inwood Theater and Nuart Theater were renovated.

2006 brought the introduction of vertical integration with the release of Bubble by Steven Soderbergh. The film played day-and-date, as it was simultaneously released in Landmark Theatres, broadcast on HDNet Movies and sold on DVD.

In 2007, Landmark Theatres acquired the Ritz Theatre Group in Philadelphia which consisted of the Ritz East, Ritz at the Bourse and Ritz V. Landmark opened their flagship theatre in Los Angeles, The Landmark. Later that year, Landmark also opened Harbor East in Baltimore and The Landmark Theatre, Greenwood Village in Denver.

In 2008, Landmark held its first live 3D/HD NBA game televised live via satellite to the Magnolia Theatre in Dallas. On March 1, Landmark assumed operation of the 7-screen Gateway Theatre, located in Columbus, Ohio. The theater featured a café, bar, and event space.

The Shattuck Cinemas in Berkeley received a comprehensive remodel in 2009 including new theater seating, lighting and carpets. Lot 68, a bar and café adjacent to the lobby, also opened its doors inside the Shattuck. Landmark entered the 3D arena with 3 locations operating 3D Projection: the Harbor East in Baltimore, the Tivoli in St. Louis, and The Landmark in Los Angeles.

In August 2009, Landmark announced the closure of its 6-screen Crossroads Cinema operation in Boulder, Colorado.

=== 2010s ===
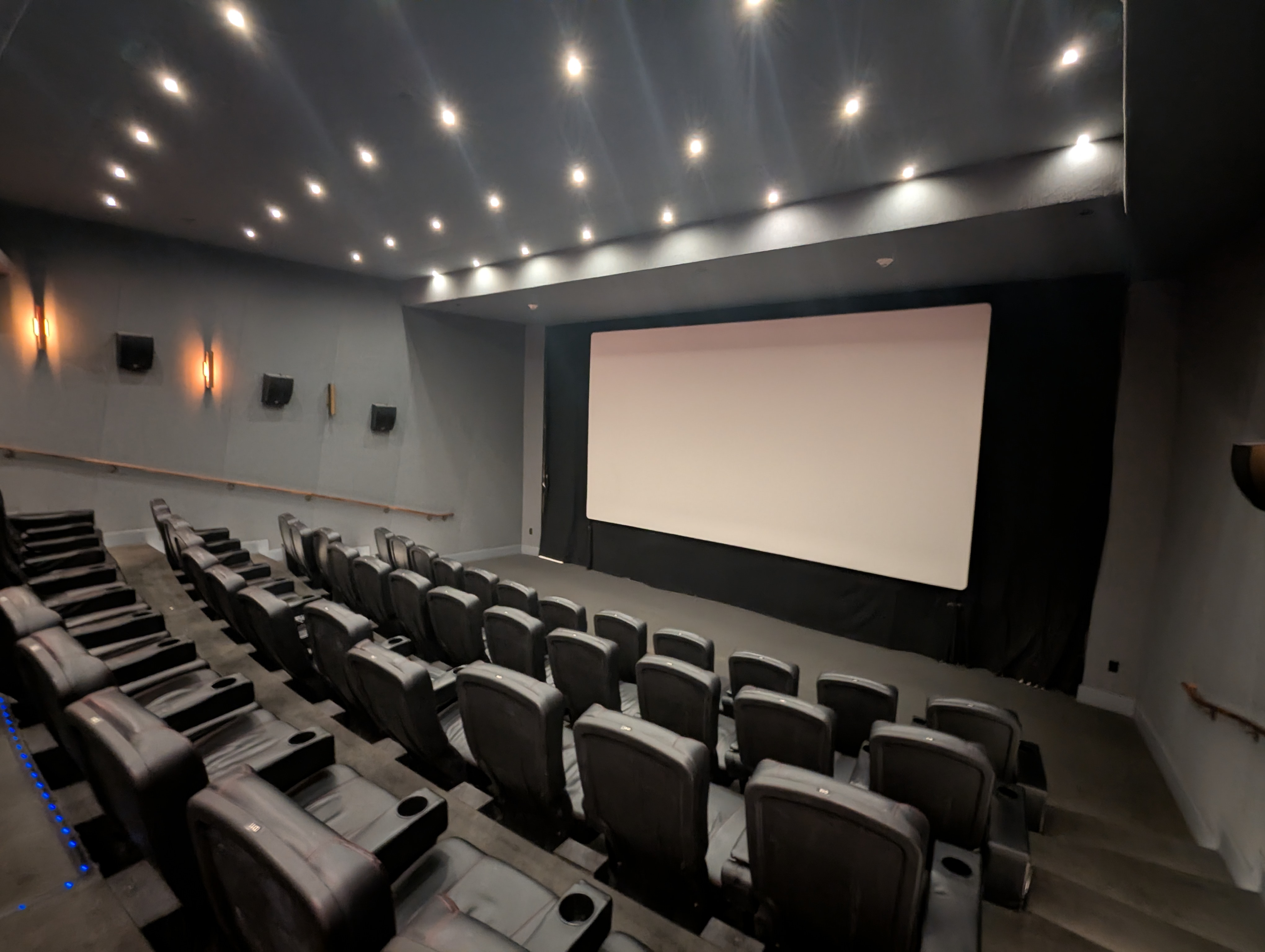
Landmark's Atlantic Pumbing Cinema opened in 2015.

Landmark assumed operation of the Glendale 12 in Indianapolis in 2010 as well as the Olde Town Stadium theater in Arvada, Colorado. In addition, the Piedmont Theatre in Oakland, California was restored, receiving new screens and new auditorium seating in addition to carpets and lighting. In Spring 2011, Landmark Theatres was put up for sale, and after receiving multiple bids, was taken off the market.

Beginning in 2012, Landmark continued renovating its theaters. The Uptown, Minneapolis, reopened in its new incarnation on September 14, 2012, which included reserved ticketing and full bar service while still preserving a balcony and a 50-foot tower, originally placed to mark the Uptown area. In October 2012, the Chez Theatre, Denver, and the Magnolia, Dallas, were extensively renovated. Upgrades to the theaters included Barco Digital Projection, upgraded digital sound and leather-style seats as well as The Magnolia Bar, a cocktail suite attached to the theater.

Renovations and upgrades continued at many of Landmark's theaters in 2013. The E Street Cinema in Washington, D.C., opened a bar. The Bethesda Row Cinema in Maryland, located outside of Washington, D.C., was completely renovated in May 2013 with new, reserved seating in all eight auditoriums and a full-service bar featuring local brews and film-themed cocktails. Located in downtown Highland Park, Chicago, Landmark¹s Renaissance Place Cinema was renovated in July 2013 with the addition of a full-service bar and lounge, an expanded concession menu and leather seating as well as two screening lounges. The Embarcadero Center Cinema, located in San Francisco¹s financial district, reopened in October 2013 after an extensive remodel which included reconfiguring the theater space to allow for two more theaters, bringing the total screen count to seven; a lounge featuring a wide variety of wine and beer was added as well as stadium seating and four Screening Lounges with electric recliners. Additionally, the Embarcadero was the first movie theater in San Francisco to feature a new assistive listening system for the hearing impaired. Coils were installed in each auditorium that wirelessly send pure sound to hearing aids that have the 'telecoil,' eliminating background noise and the need for a headset.

- On November 7, 2013, Landmark Theatres announced they would open an eight-screen complex in Capitol Point, an emerging mixed-use development along New York Avenue in Washington, D.C.
- On January 8, 2014, Landmark announced a six-screen cinema at Atlantic Plumbing, a new mixed-use community at 8th and V Streets, also in Washington, D.C. Atlantic Plumbing Cinema, a bar and movie theater, opened October 15, 2015.
- On November 20, 2015, Landmark Theatres acquired Albany, New York independent movie house Spectrum 8 Theatres. On December 15, 2015, Landmark acquired the Nickelodeon Theatres, including the Nickelodeon and Del Mar in Santa Cruz, California, and the Aptos Cinema in Aptos, California.
- In December 2016, Landmark opened their luxury theatre The Landmark at Merrick Park located in the Shops at Merrick Park shopping center in Coral Gables, Florida. This was the company's first location and currently only location in Florida.
- In June 2017, Landmark closed their Seven Gables and Guild 45 theaters in Seattle. The official reason was to prepare for renovation, although local media disputes this saying that the theaters are closed for good.
- In September 2017, Landmark opened a new east coast flagship theatre The Landmark at VIA 57 West in Midtown West Manhattan. At the start of 2018, their prior NYC flagship, the Sunshine Cinema, closed.
- In April 2018, it was made public that Wagner/Cuban had put Landmark up for sale. After initial attempts failed in 2011 and 2013, the sale was finalized on December 4, 2018, and the theatre chain was purchased by Charles S. Cohen who also owns Cohen Media Group. After the acquisition, Landmark took over booking for another Cohen-owned theater, the Quad Cinema in New York City.
- In September 2019, the Guild Theatre in Menlo Park, CA closed.
- On October 24, 2019, it was announced that long-time CEO Ted Mundorff had resigned, effectively immediately. Paul Serwitz was announced as the company's new COO and President on October 30, 2019.

=== 2020s ===
- In late January 2020, it was announced that Landmark Theatres would be closing two locations, the Clay Theatre in San Francisco and the Ritz at the Bourse in Philadelphia. The last day of business for both locations was January 26, 2020.
- In March 2020, Landmark ceased operations at their last single-screen theater in Kensington, San Diego called the Ken Cinema, having acquired it in the 1970s.
- In August 2020, Landmark proceeded to close its VIA 57 West location in New York's Upper West Side after three years of operation. This was due in part to its distance from public transit.
- In June 2021, Landmark Theatres was evicted from Uptown Theatre in Minneapolis, due to unpaid back rent. Also that month, Landmark Theaters ended their lease of the Main Art Theater in Royal Oak, Michigan, a nearby suburb of Detroit.
- In August 2021, it was announced that Landmark had acquired the Scottsdale Quarter luxury multiplex in Scottsdale, Arizona which was previously occupied by dine-in-cinema iPic Theatre.
- In November 2021, it was announced that Landmark had acquired the lease to the former Arclight Cinemas at The Glen Town Center in Glenview, Illinois and that the theater would reopen as part of the company's chain. The location began business the following year.
- In April 2022, Landmark assumed operation of the Annapolis Harbour Center.
- In May 2022, Landmark ceased operation of their cineplex The Landmark on Pico and The Shattuck Cinemas in Berkeley, and acquired the Playhouse 7 in Pasadena. In September 2022, Landmark opened the Landmark Closter Plaza.
- In June 2023, Landmark ceased operation of the Albany Twin Cinema in Albany, California.
- In July 2024, Landmark closed the Esquire Theatre in Denver, Colorado.
- In August 2024, Landmark closed the Chez Artiste in Denver, Colorado.
- In November 2024, Charles Cohen put Landmark Theatres up for auction as part of his assets in an attempt to settle a lawsuit against him for unpaid loans.
- In January 2025, Landmark ceased operation of Hillcrest Cinemas, its last theater in Hillcrest, San Diego, California.

== Locations ==
- Albany, New York
- Annapolis, Maryland
- Atlanta, Georgia
- Bethesda, Maryland
- Cambridge, Massachusetts
- Chicago, Illinois
- Closter, New Jersey
- Coral Gables, Florida
- Dallas, Texas
- Denver, Colorado
- Denton, Texas
- Frontenac, Missouri
- Glenview, Illinois
- Greenwood Village, Colorado
- Indianapolis, Indiana
- Los Angeles, California
- Minneapolis, Minnesota
- New York, New York
- Oakland, California
- Palo Alto, California
- Pasadena, California
- Philadelphia, Pennsylvania
- San Francisco, California
- Santa Cruz, California
- Scottsdale, Arizona
- Shoreline, Washington
- Washington, District of Columbia

== Silver Cinemas ==
Landmark Theatres also owned the theater chain Silver Cinemas, which primarily showed second-run movies. Down to just three cinemas entering the COVID-19 pandemic, the final of three Silver Cinemas remaining was transferred to its Landmark nameplate with the other locations closed in 2020 and 2022.
