= Simultaneous release =

Film release on multiple platforms at the same time

A simultaneous release, also known as a day-and-date release, is the release of a film on multiple platforms—most commonly theatrical, home video and video on demand (VOD)—on the exact same day, or in very close proximity to each other. This is in contrast to the industry standard of having a window of exclusivity (usually 90 days) between theatrical and home video releases.

The concept was used by several independent films released in the 2000s. In the mid-2010s, the subscription streaming service Netflix began to perform simultaneous releases of its feature films, by means of a limited theatrical release, accompanied by international availability on the Netflix service. As of Roma in 2018, Netflix began a practice of giving its films a three-week limited release before they become available on the service, which is still shorter than standard.

Due to their disruptive nature, simultaneous releases have faced mixed reactions from the industry. Advocates have considered them a means of catering to consumer choice and improving the accessibility of film, and critics arguing that they dilute box office revenue by requiring cinemas to compete with premature availability of a film on home video, and are detrimental to the traditional movie-going experience. Most major cinema chains require films to have an exclusive theatrical window of a minimum length (which in some countries is also enforced by law), so films that pursue a simultaneous release or shorter window are typically screened at independent and art house cinemas only.

Until 2020, the only film that had been released in such a manner by a major film studio was The Interview, which resorted to simultaneous releases via cinemas and digital rentals due to unforeseen circumstances inhibiting a wide theatrical release. The COVID-19 pandemic led to a wider number of simultaneous releases among major studios (either via digital rentals, or availability on a parent company's subscription streaming service) for a period from mid-2020 through mid-2021, due to cinemas not operating in all jurisdictions. With the reopening of cinemas, as well as contractual agreements with exhibitors mandating theatrical exclusivity, most major film distributors ended most of their simultaneous releases by mid-2021, with some exceptions (including several family films in late-2021 due to COVID-19 vaccines not yet being approved for children in the United States).

== Justification ==
Typically, the release of a film is governed by staggered exclusivity "windows" of specific lengths, to prevent releases of a film at different outlets from having to compete directly with each other. Release windows are enforced primarily by major cinema chains, which usually requires distributors to agree to a 74-day window before a film is offered via electronic sell-through. There is usually a 90-day window between the theatrical and home video releases.

By the 2000s, improving home cinema technology such as DVD, and the growth of piracy, gave studios an incentive to release films on home video sooner. In 2005, Disney CEO Bob Iger suggested that simultaneous releases of films at theaters and on DVD could help to counter piracy, going as far as suggesting that DVDs could be sold directly at the theater (providing an additional source of revenue to their owners). In the late-1980's, the average length of time between theatrical and home video releases was usually six months, but some blockbuster films enjoyed windows of nine to twelve months. By 2012, the average window before a home release was 112 days, which decreased to 85 by 2017.

A simultaneous release only requires a single marketing campaign, which can be beneficial for studios with lower budgets.

== Notable examples ==
- In 2005, British distributor Dogwoof experimented with the concept for its July 25 release EMR, with a theatrical release, a DVD, and digital purchase in partnership with British ISP Tiscali.
- The January 2006 release of Steven Soderbergh's Bubble was one of the first high-profile examples of a simultaneous and "end-to-end" film release. Bubble was financed by Mark Cuban and Todd Wagner through their studio 2929 Productions, which screened the film via their art house chain Landmark Theatres, and distributed the film on DVD. The film was also given airings on Cuban's HDNet and HDNet Movies cable networks. 2929 offered a 1% cut of revenue from DVD sales to cinemas who wanted to screen the film. Due to resistance over the model, major chains declined to screen Bubble.
- In March 2006, The Road to Guantánamo premiered on the British television network Channel 4 (who commissioned the film), and was released in selected theaters and on home media the following day. Andrew Eaton, co-founder of the film's distributor Revolution Films, explained that "with a film like this that's starting with what would traditionally be the last outlet—a television broadcast—we thought it would be better to go with everything else at once."
- In 2014, the wide release of the film The Interview —a film that satirizes the North Korean regime—was cancelled by Sony Pictures, after multiple chains pulled the film due to terrorist threats by a group that had also hacked Sony Pictures' internal servers, and was believed to have ties to North Korea. Sony elected to instead offer the film for digital purchase on December 24, coupled with a limited theatrical release the next day, and streaming online for a limited time.
- In 2015, the subscription streaming service Netflix began to acquire feature films, such as Beasts of No Nation. The film was distributed by Bleecker Street in a limited release to ensure award eligibility (the Academy Awards require films to have been screened in Los Angeles for a week with at least three showings per-day, in order to be eligible for nomination. They do not mandate theatrical exclusivity or bar simultaneous releases), and released on Netflix's streaming service internationally day-and-date with the theatrical release. Since Roma in 2018, Netflix has given its feature films a limited, three-week release prior to their debut on the service.

=== Use during the COVID-19 pandemic ===
The 2020 onset of the COVID-19 pandemic led to the mandated closure of cinemas worldwide in order to prevent large public gatherings. On March 16, DreamWorks Animation announced that its film Trolls World Tour would be given a simultaneous release as a digital rental on April 10, as part of a larger announcement that parent company Universal Pictures would also offer early rentals for several recent films still in theaters (including Emma, The Hunt, and The Invisible Man). As promotional campaigns and tie-ins for the film (including corporate synergy across the properties of Universal parent company NBCUniversal) were already in progress, it would have been difficult to cleanly postpone its release. The film itself had already been moved up to an Easter weekend release, replacing the James Bond film No Time to Die (which was deferred to November 2020 due to the pandemic, but ultimately delayed to October 2021) on Universal's schedule.

Trolls World Tour did receive theatrical screenings at around 25 drive-in theaters in the United States; Deadline Hollywood estimated that these screenings grossed $60,000 on its opening weekend (full box office numbers are not available, as Universal Pictures and Comscore suspended their reports of figures beginning March 19 and 20). Universal announced on April 13 that Trolls World Tour was its largest-ever debut for a digital release (surpassing Jurassic World: Fallen Kingdom ten-fold), with exact figures pending because they are not reported in the same manner as conventional box office figures. It became the top rental on a variety of VOD services (including FandangoNow, iTunes Store, Google Play Movies/YouTube, and Vudu) over its opening weekend, with FandangoNow (majority-owned by Universal parent Comcast) announcing that the film was its most pre-ordered rental of all-time, its most-ordered rental within the first day of availability, and its most-ordered rental within the first three days of availability. Deadline Hollywood estimated that based on its budget, the film could break-even with around $200 million in revenue if between 9–12 million rentals were purchased.

On April 28, NBCUniversal CEO Jeff Shell reported to The Wall Street Journal that Trolls had reached around 5 million rentals and nearly $100 million in revenue, and stated that the company planned to release films "on both formats" as soon as cinemas reopen.

On November 18, 2020, Warner Bros. announced that Wonder Woman 1984 would be released in U.S. cinemas on December 25 and become available day-and-date on HBO Max for one month after its release. On December 3, Warner Bros. subsequently announced that this model would be extended to all of the studio's 2021 releases. The announcement was met with backlash across the industry, showing concerns that this would further erode the cinema industry, and that the move had been performed unilaterally without forewarning. Disney pursued a similar strategy for selected films, with day-and-date rentals available to Disney+ subscribers ("Premier Access") for films such as Mulan, Raya and the Last Dragon, Cruella, and Black Widow.

Restrictions began to ease in key markets such as the United States and United Kingdom over 2021. The major studios began to phase out these strategies pursuant to agreements with exhibitors; in March 2021, Warner Bros. confirmed an agreement with Cineworld that requires a 45-day exclusivity window for its releases beginning in 2022, while Universal agreed to 17-day windows with multiple chains (including shares of rental revenue). In September 2021, Disney announced that it would switch back to theatrical-only releases for the remainder of its 2021 slate, citing the successful performance of Shang-Chi and the Legend of the Ten Rings.

Concerns over SARS-CoV-2 variants and the lack of approved COVID-19 vaccines for children at the time led to delays and simultaneous releases for several family films, such as Clifford the Big Red Dog (theaters and Paramount+), The Addams Family 2 (theaters and digital rental), and Turning Red (Disney+, theaters in regions where Disney+ had not yet launched, as well as limited runs at selected cinemas in the U.S. and UK). In 2022, Universal shifted several of its films to simultaneous releases on NBCUniversal's streaming service Peacock, such as Marry Me, Firestarter, Halloween Ends, and Honk for Jesus. Save Your Soul.

== Reception and responses ==
Advocates of simultaneous releases argue that they promote consumer choice, by allowing viewers to choose how and when they want to watch a film, especially if they do not have access to a cinema. Netflix stated its model "[provides] access for people who can't always afford, or live in towns without, theaters. Letting everyone, everywhere enjoy releases at the same time. Giving filmmakers more ways to share art. These things are not mutually exclusive." In April 2019, Steven Spielberg similarly stated that "everyone should have access to great stories", and that they should be able to "find their entertainment in any form or fashion that suits them".

Film industry figures have argued that simultaneous releases can dilute box office revenue, and detract from the communal experience of movie-going. Following the announcement of Bubble's simultaneous release, M. Night Shyamalan stated that the distributor's plans were "heartless and soulless and disrespectful", and argued that cable and internet companies needed to "wait their turn". Major cinema chains often refuse to carry films that do not adhere to an industry-standard exclusivity window, which can reduce a film's ability to reach a wider audience; IndieWire acknowledged that a peak of 500 U.S. cinemas reached by Martin Scorsese's Netflix-distributed The Irishman (relying on independent and art house cinemas) was "close to the maximum number" it could be screened at without involvement from major chains.

In 2018, the Cannes Film Festival instituted a rule requiring all films screened to have a scheduled theatrical release in the country. Under French law at the time, theatrically released films were prohibited from being distributed on subscription video on demand services until three years after their original release. At the time, there was a proposal to shorten this to 15 months, if the service agrees to pay levies and perform investments in domestic productions. The move came following criticism of Netflix's submissions at the 2017 festival, which raised questions over whether it was appropriate to exhibit a film intended for a simultaneous release at a festival devoted to showcasing theatrical film.

Netflix's day-and-date streaming of On My Skin (2018) upon its theatrical release in Italy was widely criticized by the local film industry, who felt that Netflix's use of the publicly funded Venice Film Festival to promote its service and content (including On My Skin and Golden Lion winner Roma) was detrimental to Italian and European film. In November 2018, Italy's Minister of Culture Alberto Bonisoli announced that the industry's 105-day window between theatrical and streaming releases of a film (usually enforced via gentleman's agreement) would be enshrined in law.

Since 2019, the Toronto International Film Festival has been restricted from scheduling films submitted by streaming services at the Scotiabank Theatre Toronto (the main venue of the event), due to theatrical windowing requirements enforced by its owner Cineplex Entertainment.

The Verge felt that Trolls World Tour "could be a case study for Hollywood's digital future" even after the COVID-19 pandemic, acknowledging that although the vast majority of high-profile blockbuster films were more likely to receive a windowed release as to not erode relationships with the cinema industry (a preference endorsed by the Cinema United, which has led to such films having their releases repeatedly postponed, such as F9 and No Time to Die, rather than a simultaneous or straight-to-digital release), studios may be more likely to explore simultaneous releases on a case-by-case basis, especially for mid-budget films with lower revenue expectations (which could benefit from a wider multi-platform release).

On April 28, 2020, AMC Theatres announced that it will no longer screen Universal Pictures films, in direct retaliation for NBCUniversal CEO Jeff Shell's plan to pursue simultaneous release for all film releases going forward. The studio later agreed to allow AMC a cut of revenue from premium VOD rentals in exchange for a 17-day minimum on the theatrical window.

In March 2021, Disney CEO Bob Chapek argued that the shifts in distribution models for films would likely become permanent, as consumers had become "impatient" and have "had the luxury of an entire year of getting titles at home pretty much when they want them", but that "we certainly don't want to do anything like cut the legs off a theatrical exhibition run."
