= Kim Jorgensen =

American film director

Kim M. Jorgensen is an American film director and the owner of distributor Landmark Films. Jorgensen was born in Copenhagen, Denmark.

He founded Landmark Theaters, the largest art house movie theater chain in the United States, and was its president until 1989 when he sold the company. Todd Wagner and Mark Cuban currently own the chain through their company 2929 Entertainment.

Jorgensen directed and wrote Emilio (2008). He has produced and packaged other films: The Kentucky Fried Movie (1977), Airplane! (1980), Bad Manners (a.k.a. Growing Pains) (1984), Out of Africa (1985), and Mortuary Academy (1988), and has developed film projects with directors such as Orson Welles, David Lynch, Paul Verhoeven, Carlos Diegues, Hector Babenco, King Hu, David Lean, and Franco Zeffirelli.
