= Bubble (2005 film) =

- Theatrical release poster
- Directed by: Steven Soderbergh
- Written by: Coleman Hough
- Produced by: Gregory Jacobs; Todd Wagner; Mark Cuban; Jason Kliot
- Starring: Debbie Doebereiner; Dustin James Ashley; Misty Dawn Wilkins
- Cinematography: Peter Andrews
- Edited by: Mary Ann Bernard
- Music by: Robert Pollard
- Production companies: 2929 Entertainment; Extension 765; Section Eight
- Distributed by: Magnolia Pictures
- Release dates: September 3, 2005 (Venice Film Festival); January 27, 2006 (United States)
- Running time: 73 minutes
- Country: United States
- Language: English
- Budget: $1.6 million
- Box office: $261,966

Bubble is a 2005 American crime drama film directed by Steven Soderbergh about three low-paid doll factory workers, one of whom is murdered. Soderbergh also shot and edited the film under the pseudonyms Peter Andrews and Mary Ann Bernard, taken from his father's given names and his mother's maiden name, respectively. The film was shot on high-definition video.

Bubble is unusual in that it had no traditional script and used only non-professional actors recruited from the Parkersburg, West Virginia and Belpre, Ohio area, where the film was shot. All lines were improvised according to an outline written by screenwriter Coleman Hough, who previously teamed with Soderbergh on Full Frontal. Bubble was the first of six films Soderbergh planned to shoot and release in the same manner.

The film was released simultaneously in movie theaters and on the cable/satellite TV network HDNet Movies on January 27, 2006; the DVD was released a few days later, on January 31. Bubble received a Best Director nomination for Soderbergh at the 2007 Independent Spirit Awards. The score for the film was composed by Robert Pollard, an Ohio native.

== Plot ==
Martha is a middle-aged single woman who cares for her disabled father in an unnamed, poverty-stricken rust belt town in Ohio. Martha regularly drives her younger co-worker, Kyle, to and from their workplace at a doll factory, as well as to Kyle's second job at a shovel factory across the Ohio River in West Virginia. Kyle is a quiet young man who has social anxiety disorder and lives with his television-obsessed single mother. Martha, who appears to have no social outlets or friends outside of work, has become attached to Kyle and shows concern for his welfare, tries to get him to go on dates, and tells him he is her "best friend". Although the withdrawn Kyle opens up a little bit to Martha, he does not act as interested in her as she is in him.

In order to meet demand, the doll factory hires Rose, an attractive young woman Kyle's age who is the single mother of a toddler. Kyle and Rose are mutually attracted to each other, and begin to spend time together during their breaks at work, to Martha's chagrin as she herself is pushed aside and unable to have her usual interactions with Kyle. Martha grudgingly agrees to drive Rose to her second job as a housekeeper for a wealthy client, but Martha becomes further irritated with Rose when Rose takes advantage of her client's absence to take a long bath in the client's jacuzzi. Rose also claims that a watch she stole from her client was a gift. Martha complains to Kyle about Rose's behavior.

Despite her dislike of Rose, Martha accepts the opportunity to earn some extra money by babysitting for Rose while Rose goes on a date. Martha only learns that Rose's date is Kyle when he arrives at Rose's home to pick her up, causing Martha to become upset. During their date, Rose and Kyle go to Kyle's house where Rose, unbeknownst to Kyle, steals money that he has been saving and hiding away in his bedroom. When Kyle drops Rose off, he decides not to go inside with her because he felt a "weird vibe" from Martha earlier. Right after Rose enters the house, her ex-boyfriend Jake appears and accuses Rose of stealing money and marijuana from his house. Rose and Jake have a heated argument in front of Martha. After Jake leaves, Martha asks Rose if he is the father of her child, and Rose angrily tells her to mind her own business.

The next morning the police arrive at Rose's house after neighbors hear her child crying and call them. They find Rose dead of apparent strangulation, with no sign of forced entry. A detective questions both Jake and Kyle, who each claim to know nothing about the murder. Meanwhile, Martha pawns jewelry (which she says she inherited from family members) and spends the money on fishing equipment and a trip to the beauty parlor. She then takes the fishing equipment to Kyle's house and gives it to him as a gift; he tells her of Rose's murder and, apparently surprised by the news, she says she knows nothing. She is later questioned by a detective and maintains her innocence, even when he tells her that the fingerprints found on Rose's neck match her own. Martha is arrested for Rose's murder.

Kyle visits Martha in prison. Martha pleads with Kyle to help her, swearing she did not murder Rose and doesn't know what happened, though she mentions a headache and Rose's rudeness. Kyle is skeptical of her story. Later, in her jail cell, Martha sees a bright light, followed by a vision of Rose's dead body and herself standing over Rose. Kyle's mother takes Rose's job at the doll factory and Kyle's humdrum life working two jobs continues as it did before.

== Cast ==
- Debbie Doebereiner as Martha
- Dustin James Ashley as Kyle
- Misty Dawn Wilkins as Rose
- K. Smith as Jake
- Laurie Lee as Kyle’s mother
- Decker Moody as Detective Dan Taylor

== Production ==
=== Development and filming ===
Steven Soderbergh and Coleman Hough wanted to do a film that involved a love triangle and a factory setting. As they realized the characters would be a focus of the story, they decided the other major element would be the film's setting. In her research on Midwestern factories, Hough learned about a doll-parts factory in Belpre, Ohio. Said Soderbergh, "It's one of the last three [doll-part factories] in the US; the rest have moved to China. And it was even better than I hoped. When we went to visit, it was even more surreal and bizarre than I could have imagined."

Hough, location manager Carlos Moore, and casting director Carmen Cuba scouted the area and got to know the locals, which led to the casting of nonprofessional actors. Debbie Doebereiner was cast when Cuba saw her working the drive-through window at a Parkersburg KFC.

Filming took 18 days. Much of the actors' dialogue was improvisational. Soderberg noted (in the Director's Comments) that he often had the actors seated or in relatively static poses in order to reduce blocking, and hence, the demands on the actors.

=== Deleted scene ===
Hough said the outline of the script started out with the reveal of a brain tumor as the cause for Martha's irrational behavior. Soderbergh shot an ending scene where Martha is taken to a hospital after fainting in her jail cell, where she is told by a doctor that a CAT scan has revealed she has a severely malignant tumor. The doctor then explains to her that the tumor could cause blackouts and highly abnormal behavior. Test audiences reacted negatively to this scene and felt the film didn't need a specific explanation for Martha's behavior, so it was left out of the final cut. It is included as a deleted scene on the film's DVD release.

== Release ==
Bubble had its world premiere at the 2005 Venice Film Festival. Ahead of its January 27, 2006 simultaneous release, the film garnered industry buzz for being the first feature by an Oscar-winning director to be released day-and-date in movie theaters and on a cable/satellite TV network (HDNet Movies), with a DVD release just a few days after. Some theater owners refused to screen the film in protest of the simultaneous release, fearing that a move toward on-demand home viewing would hurt the livelihood of the moviegoing industry.

The film was to be the first of six features Soderbergh would direct under a deal he signed with HDNet Films. Soderbergh said the deal would give him the opportunity to explore artistic ground not usually supported by major studios, while also providing new ways of reaching film audiences. He added, "The ideal for me, I suppose, is that you see the film in the theater. You like it. And on your way out, you stop at the concession stand and buy it on DVD. But if that doesn’t happen, I’ll be pleased if people just see the DVD or watch it on TV.”

With a rollout similar to Bubble, all of the six films would also be site-specific, utilize a nonprofessional cast, and provide what the director called "a sort of oblique angle on what it's like to be in America." Bubble did not recoup its $1.6 million budget in theaters or on home video, and the producing partners that oversaw the company's deal with Soderbergh left in 2007. The only other films Soderbergh directed as part of the HDNet partnership is 2009's The Girlfriend Experience and the 2010 documentary And Everything is Going Fine.

== Reception ==
=== Critical response ===
On the review aggregation website Rotten Tomatoes, the film has an approval rating of 72%, based on 105 reviews, with an average rating of 6.7/10. The website's consensus reads, "This rigorously stripped down, seemingly mundane little film still manages to be engrossing and creepy." Metacritic, which uses a weighted average, assigned the film a score of 63 out of 100, based on 32 critics, indicating "generally favorable" reviews.

While some critics found the film too slight and spare in its story, others praised Soderbergh’s use of nonprofessional actors and filming techniques. For Film Comment, Amy Taubin said the cast "[brings] a verisimilitude to the film that would be impossible to achieve with professional actors," and noted, "Soderbergh eschews the kinetic, restless camera movement that had become his signature" and opts for an atmosphere of stillness.

Christopher Orr of The Atlantic wrote, "Bubble is not a great film in any conventional sense. With its flat, static compositions, it's actually better suited for the small screen on which it was simultaneously released. But it is a strangely gripping little drama, a reminder that cinema can be powerful even when it's not at all cinematic." He commented, "Soderbergh and his amateur cast get unnervingly under the skin, capturing each small slight and imposition with excruciating vividness. The resulting wounds and resentments are all the more real for being largely unacknowledged: These characters have seen their needs and aspirations beaten down for so long that they can barely recognize, let alone articulate, them any more."

In a four-star review, Roger Ebert wrote, "The characters are so closely observed and played with such exacting accuracy and conviction that Bubble' becomes quietly, inexorably, hypnotic." Manohla Dargis of The New York Times said, "Easier to admire than love, Bubble' is a fascinating exercise that seems calculated to repel most audiences, which probably suits Mr. Soderbergh just fine." Desson Thomson of The Washington Post wrote, "Soderbergh and screenwriter Coleman Hough aren't interested in creating a coy whodunit so much as evoking the deeper, less romantic mysteries of people -- and it's riveting." He concluded the film shows that "small, experimental and committed can so often provoke stronger emotions than those high-budget spectacles."

=== Accolades ===
Soderbergh was nominated for Best Director at the 2007 Independent Spirit Awards for this film.
