= East Towne Mall (disambiguation) =

East Towne Mall is a shopping center in Madison, Wisconsin, United States.

East Towne Mall may also refer to:

- East Towne Mall (Tennessee), later known as Knoxville Center, in Knoxville, Tennessee

== See also ==
- East Town Mall in Green Bay, Wisconsin
