= Kensington Terrace =

Proposed development in San Diego, California

Coordinates: 32.7635°N 117.1063°W

Kensington Terrace was a proposed 56,000-square-foot (5,200 m^{2}) mixed-use development project in the Kensington neighborhood of San Diego, California. The project was controversial. The controversy stemmed partly because of its size compared to the existing neighborhood buildings, and also due to neighborhood concerns regarding the impact on traffic and parking, and the demolition of two historically authentic single-family houses.

Due primarily to the downturn in the economy in 2008, the Kensington Terrace project was never built. Instead, beginning in 2014, a new project, named Kensington Commons, was constructed in its place. Kensington Commons has a reduced footprint at 32,000 SF, is three stories high, and has 34 apartments over 10,000 SF of commercial space.

== Project plans ==
Kensington Terrace was a proposed mixed-use development project that would total 52,000 square feet (4,800 m^{2}) of commercial, retail, and residential space. The proposed project site is in the Kensington neighborhood of San Diego, California. It would be on the north side of Adams Avenue, east of State Route 15, and the proposed building would occupy the entirety of the block between Marlborough Drive and Edgeware Road. The main building, covering most of the block, would be the first three-story building on that section of Adams Ave. The ground floor would have 16,000 sq ft (1,500 m^{2}) of retail space, the second floor would have 16,000 sq ft (1,500 m^{2}) of office space, and the third floor would be six residential condominia offered for sale. Abutting that building and occupying the remainder of the lot would be a set of three-story row houses.

== History ==
Despite approval by the Ken-Tal planning group, the San Diego Planning commission, and the San Diego City Council, the project's opponents state that the three-story, one-block project is too large to fit into the small-neighborhood feel of Kensington where most of the other commercial buildings are only one and two-story. They believe that the traffic study has numerous factual flaws that are under-reporting the impact the project would have upon streets that already are at or below a failing level of service under San Diego's traffic criteria. They are also concerned about the planned demolition of a home that currently sits on the site. The developers, including Sunroad principal Richard Vann and architect Allard Jansen of Allard Jansen Architects in the community of Kensington in San Diego, requested and were granted a height variance that allows them to build eight feet higher than allowed in the CN-1-3 zone. Residents fear that this will set a precedent for future development patterns. They filed an appeal with the San Diego City Council to require the city to perform a full Environmental Impact Report as required by the California Environmental Quality Act (CEQA). The city council went against the advice of the city attorney's office and approved the project with a 5–2 vote. One Councilmember who voted to grant the appeal, Donna Frye, said in explaining her vote, "This is the height buster project." Residents pledged to file suit under CEQA to force the full EIR to be completed.

The Roy and Dora Bennett house proposed for demolition is a 1923 Colonial Revival. This house was identified during the 1996 Mid-City historical resources inventory as a contributing resource to a potential Kensington Historical District. It is located in the original 1910 Kensington Park subdivision, one of San Diego's oldest 'streetcar suburbs'. The house is adjacent to the old trolley line and is a fine example of a small home from the early years of the Better Homes in America Movement, which was spearheaded by Herbert Hoover when he was Secretary of Commerce under President Warren Harding. Under the California Environmental Quality Act, an Environmental Impact Report (EIR) must be prepared when an historically significant resource is proposed for demolition.

The "Heart of Kensington", a neighborhood non-profit organization, filed a lawsuit against the project on March 5, 2008. According to papers filed with the Superior Court, the group seeks judgment on several points, including:

1. That this Court find that by making the final approvals Defendant has not proceeded in a manner required by law, has not adopted requisite findings, and/or the substantial evidence does not support its decisions;
2. That this Court issue a peremptory writ of mandamus declaring that one or more of the decision(s) rendered by Defendant on or about February 5, 2008, and any additional resolution(s) of Defendant relating to, or dependent upon the same, are null and void and of no force and/or legal effect
3. That this Court order Defendant to vacate and set aside each of the decisions made on or about February 5, 2008, and each of the resolutions, administrative approvals, permits, and any other decisions of Defendant with respect thereto;
4. That there be issued a writ of mandamus ordering Defendant to prepare an EIR within a reasonable date from the issuance of said writ of mandate, in the event the Real Parties or other successor owner/develop wish to pursue the Project.
5. That until such time as Plaintiff above's claims can be adjudicated by this Court, Defendant and Real Parties be enjoined, restrained and/or Defendant's February 5, 2008 decisions be stayed from taking effect to preserve the status quo, existing structures and environmental qualities so as to prevent frustration of Plaintiff's and the public's rightful claims and right to judicial review...

The San Diego city attorney's office, who has advised the city council that state law requires a full EIR for the project, has not commented on the pending litigation.

In April 2008 the parties agreed to a compromise that would allow a smaller version of the project to proceed. As part of the settlement, the development consortium agreed to measures to reduce the physical size and traffic impacts for the project. They also agreed to set aside a minimum of 33% of the retail space of the building for non-national chain tenants. In May 2008, demolition of the old structures at the site was completed. New development began in early 2014 and the project is expected to be occupied by the end of 2014.
