= Prizeo =

Internet fundraising platform

- Industry: Celebrity charitable crowd funding
- Founded: June 2013
- Founders: Bryan Baum, Leo Seigal, Andrej Pancik
- Headquarters: Los Angeles, California, United States
- Owner: Todd Wagner
- Website: prizeo.com

Prizeo is a privately owned internet company based in Los Angeles, California. It is an online fundraising platform that enables clients to mobilize their fan bases to raise funds and awareness for their chosen causes.

In June 2015, businessman Todd Wagner acquired Prizeo. The terms of the deal were not disclosed. Prizeo is a member of Wagner’s Charity Network, which is also the parent company to charity auction site Charitybuzz.

== History ==
As undergraduates at Oxford University, co-founders Bryan Baum and Leo Seigal worked with the Aloysius Society, a philanthropic group that organized high-priced charity events. The society raised $1 million running auctions, but Baum and Seigal were frustrated at the cost of their fundraising strategy and the lack of scale. In 2012, the duo teamed up with co-founder Andrej Pancik and Lukas Bosko to create Prizeo, a sweepstakes platform to help nonprofits raise funds and awareness.

In January 2013, Prizeo participated in the technology start-up incubator Y Combinator’s Winter 2013 program.

== Campaigns ==
Since launching, the platform has held nearly 200 sweepstakes campaigns and raised more than $50M for hundreds of charities. Prizeo has also featured celebrities in certain campaigns.
