= Ken Cinema =

- Interactive map of Ken Cinema
- Address: 4061 Adams Avenue; San Diego, California; U.S.
- Owner: Robert Burken; Tom Frenkel
- Capacity: 575

Construction
- Opened: 1946
- Closed: 2020

The Ken Cinema, also known as Ken Theater and The Ken, was a one-screen movie theater, operated on Adams Avenue in Kensington, San Diego between 1946 and 2020. It specialized in art house, classic-film revivals, foreign films and cult classic midnight movies like Rocky Horror Picture Show and The Room.

== History ==
Robert Burken opened the single-screen theatre in 1946. Marie Maher was manager in 1974 and Landmark Theatres assumed control in 1975. In the 1980s, Eleanor Durham was the manager.

In 2008, the cinema and adjacent video store was known to bring movie goers from around San Diego County. In 2014, Landmark threatened to close the theater but renewed their contract "...because of the outrage to the closing of this beloved theatre."

On February 22, 2020, Landmark announced that it would not be renewing its lease with the Ken. It was scheduled to screen its final "classic-films week" on March 22, but was forced to close a week early due to Governor Newsom's order to close all non-essential businesses due to the COVID-19 pandemic. The theater was sold in 2022. Tom Frenkel became the new owner and reconstructed the interior for community business suites, while preserving the exterior appearance with the marquee and ticket booth.

== Notable films ==
- Antonio Gaudi
- Anvil (with live band performance)
- Attack of the Killer Tomatoes
- The Big Lebowski
- Breakfast at Tiffany's
- Casablanca
- Charade
- Dance Craze
- Godzilla
- A Hard Day’s Night
- House/Hausu
- Intolerance (1916)
- Jaws
- Last Days in Vietnam
- Last Tango in Paris
- Lawrence of Arabia
- Liquid Sky
- Mandy
- Marx Brothers' A Night at the Opera (featuring a performance of the 'Anvil Chorus' from Giuseppe Verdi's 'Il trovatore' by members of the San Diego Opera).
- Monty Python and the Holy Grail
- Nymphomaniac
- Quadrophenia
- The Rocky Horror Picture Show
- The Room
- The Seven Samurai
- Singin’ in the Rain
- The Texas Chainsaw Massacre
- They Live
- Urgh! A Music War
