= Emilio (film) =

- Poster
- Directed by: Kim Jorgensen
- Written by: Kim Jorgensen
- Produced by: Jason Thomas
- Starring: Walter Perez; Danny Martinez; Alejandro Patiño; Wendell Wright; Jesse Garcia; Ryan McTavish
- Cinematography: Denis Maloney
- Music by: Tree Adams
- Production company: Landmark Films
- Distributed by: Landmark Films
- Release dates: August 8, 2008 (Los Angeles Downtown Film Festival); November 4, 2016
- Running time: 100 minutes
- Country: United States
- Languages: English; Spanish

Emilio is a 2008 American drama film written and directed by Kim Jorgensen, starring Walter Perez, Danny Martinez, Alejandro Patiño, Wendell Wright, Jesse Garcia, and Ryan McTavish. It was released theatrically in the U.S. on November 4, 2016.

== Cast ==
- Walter Perez as Emilio
- Danny Martinez as Jose
- Alejandro Patiño as Fausto
- Wendell Wright as Octavio (bum)
- Jesse Garcia as Hot Dog Vendor
- Ryan McTavish as Zack

== Reception ==
=== Critical response ===
The film received a favorable critical review by Todd McCarthy (Variety), stating "'Emilio' delivers an engrossing and sometimes vibrant portrait of a naive Mexican kid’s sink-or-swim encounter with the urban beast that is contempo Los Angeles."
