= 2929 Entertainment =

American mass media company

2929 Entertainment, LLC
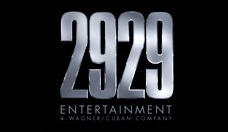
- Type: Private
- Industry: Film, television, home entertainment, home video, movie theaters
- Founded: 2002; 24 years ago
- Founder: Todd Wagner; Mark Cuban
- Headquarters: Dallas, Texas
- Key people: Todd Wagner (CEO); Schuyler Hansen (Managing Director)
- Divisions: 2929 Productions; Magnolia Pictures; Magnify Films; Spotlight Cinema Networks; Truly Indie; AXS TV (co-owner); Rysher Entertainment; HDNet Films; HDNet Movies
- Website: 2929entertainment.com

2929 Entertainment, LLC. is an American integrated media and entertainment company co-founded by billionaire entrepreneurs Todd Wagner and Mark Cuban. Founded in 2002, 2929 maintains companies and interests across several industries including entertainment development and packaging, film and television production and distribution, digital and broadcast syndication, theatrical exhibition, and home entertainment.

2929 Entertainment has offices in Los Angeles, New York, and Dallas. Wagner and Cuban co-own 2929 with Sky Hansen serving as managing director.

== History ==
2929 Entertainment made several strategic acquisitions to assure that releases could be made available to any audience across a variety of platforms simultaneously. Wagner says that "ready availability of such infrastructure would be an operating advantage to both the circuit and the production company." Some titles would even see DVD releases alongside theatrical openings as early as 2007, through an early partnership with Netflix.

An extensive catalogue of television and film rights were acquired with Rysher Entertainment in 2001, and 2929 would co-produce a newer version of Star Search which premiered in January 2003 on CBS (the original Star Search aired from 1983 to 1995).

Variety praised 2929 as a "pioneer" for its simultaneous theatrical and cable television release of Steven Soderbergh's Bubble in 2006. Bubble was the first of several films with concurrent releases in theaters and through 2929's cable channel HDNet. At the time, this move was controversial as most films are released in different formats on a staggered schedule, giving each channel an exclusive window. Exhibitors were especially timorous, as many feared that they would eventually lose their exclusive release windows for more mainstream films.

== Operations ==
=== Production companies ===
2929 Entertainment develops original feature and series through its production company 2929 Productions, and formerly through HDNet Films.

==== 2929 Productions, LLC ====
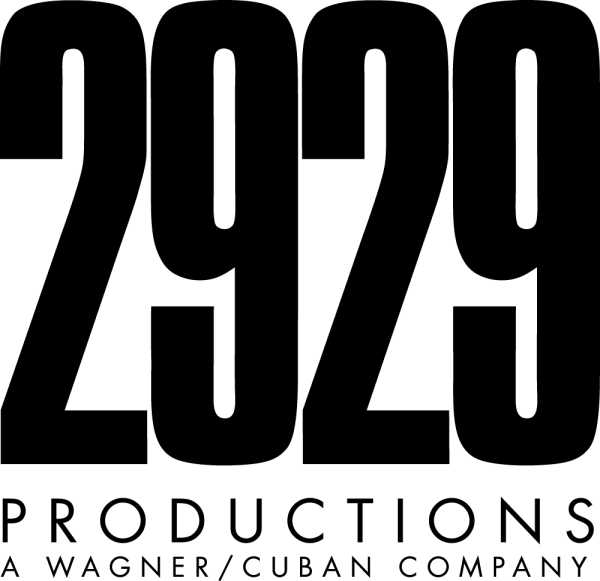
2929 Production's logo.

2929 Productions, LLC. was co-founded by Wagner and Cuban in 2003. The film and television studio selectively finances and develops feature films and series, often through partnerships with industry creators or entertainment companies.

2929 Productions is headed by Haley Jones. Previous studio leadership has included Ben Cosgrove (formerly of Paramount and Section Eight) and Marc Butan (MadRiver Pictures and formerly Lionsgate).

Godsend, Criminal and The Jacket were among of the studio's first projects, with the latter two being co-produced and co-financed with Steven Soderbergh and George Clooney's Section Eight Productions. After his work on Godsend, Marc Butan was offered studio head at 2929 leading him to exit an EVP role at Lionsgate.

In 2005, 2929 Productions released Good Night, And Good Luck. with Warner Independent. The film uses a mix of archival footage and contemporary production to tell the story of the famed wartime reporter Edward Murrow (David Strathairn) and his historic "See it Now" broadcast criticizing Senator Joseph McCarthy and the Red Scare. To mitigate risks that could arise with a black-and-white feature film, Wagner engaged Jeff Skoll and his company Participant Media to produce Good Night, And Good Luck, which grossed over $30 million (USA) and was nominated for six Academy Awards, including Best Picture.

2929 Productions
Year	Film	Director	Release date
2002	Searching for Debra Winger	Rosanna Arquette	July 13, 2002
2004	Godsend	Nick Hamm	April 30, 2004
2004	Criminal	Gregory Jacobs	September 10, 2004
2005	The Jacket	John Maybury	January 23, 2005 (Sundance Film Festival); March 4, 2005
2005	Good Night, and Good Luck	George Clooney	September 1, 2005 (Venice Film Festival); October 7, 2005 (United States)
2006	Akeelah and the Bee	Doug Atchison	March 16, 2006 (Cleveland International Film Festival); April 28, 2006 (United States)
2006	Turistas	John Stockwell	December 1, 2006
2006	Black Christmas	Glen Morgan	December 15, 2006 (United Kingdom); December 19, 2006 (TCL Chinese Theatre); December 25, 2006 (United States)
2007	The Ex	Jesse Peretz	May 11, 2007
2007	We Own the Night	James Gray	May 25, 2007 (Cannes Film Festival); October 12, 2007 (United States)
2008	The Life Before Her Eyes	Vadim Perelman	September 8, 2007 (Toronto International Film Festival); April 18, 2008
2008	What Just Happened	Barry Levinson	January 19, 2008 (Sundance Film Festival); May 25, 2008 (Cannes); October 17, 2008 (United States)
2009	Two Lovers	James Gray	May 19, 2008 (Cannes Film Festival); February 13, 2009 (United States)
2009	The Girlfriend Experience	Steven Soderbergh	January 20, 2009 (Sundance Film Festival); May 22, 2009 (United States)
2009	The Burning Plain	Guillermo Arriaga	August 29, 2008 (Venice Film Festival); September 18, 2009 (United States)
2009	The Road	John Hillcoat	September 3, 2009 (Venice Film Festival); September 13, 2009 (Toronto International Film Festival); November 25, 2009 (United States)
2012	Tim and Eric's Billion Dollar Movie	Tim Heidecker and Eric Wareheim	January 20, 2012 (Sundance Film Festival); March 2, 2012 (United States)
2012	Deadfall	Stefan Ruzowitzky	April 22, 2012 (Tribeca Film Festival); December 7, 2012 (United States)
2015	Serena	Susanne Bier	October 13, 2014 (BFI London Film Festival); November 12, 2014 (France); March 27, 2015 (United States)
2017	2:22	Paul Currie	June 30, 2017
2017	Permanent	Colette Burson	September 30, 2017 (Edmonton International Film Festival)
2018	Please Stand By	Ben Lewin	October 27, 2017 (Austin Film Festival); January 26, 2018 (United States)
2018	The China Hustle	Jed Rothstein	March 20, 2018
2023	The League	Sam Pollard	June 12, 2023 (Tribeca Festival); July 12, 2023 (United States)

==== HDNet Films ====
HDNet Films, the motion picture division of the HDNet network (now AXS TV), produced lower budget movies in high definition.

HDNet Films
Year	Film	Director	Release date
2005	Enron: The Smartest Guys in the Room	Alex Gibney	April 22, 2005
2005	The War Within	Joseph Castelo	September 30, 2005
2006	Bubble	Steven Soderbergh	September 3, 2005 (Venice Film Festival)/January 27, 2006 (United States)
2006	S&Man	J. T. Petty	March 10, 2006 (SXSW Film Festival)
2006	Herbie Hancock: Possibilities	Doug Biro & Jon Fine	April 18, 2006
2006	One Last Thing...	Alex Steyermark	September 12, 2005 (TIFF)/May 5, 2006 (United States)
2006	The Architect	Matt Tauber	April 26, 2006
2007	Diggers	Katherine Dieckmann	March 30, 2007 (USA)
2007	Fay Grim	Hal Hartley	September 11, 2006 (TIFF)/May 18, 2007 (United States)
2007	Broken English	Zoe Cassavetes	January 20, 2007 (Sundance)/June 22, 2007 (United States)
2007	Mr. Untouchable	Marc Levin	October 26, 2007
2007	Redacted	Brian De Palma	August 31, 2007 (Venice Film Festival)/November 16, 2007 (United States)
2008	Surfwise	Doug Pray	September 11, 2007 (TIFF)/May 9, 2008 (USA)
2008	Quid Pro Quo	Carlos Brooks	June 13, 2008
2008	Gonzo: The Life and Work of Dr. Hunter S. Thompson	Alex Gibney	January 20, 2008 (Sundance)
2009	American Swing	Jon Hart & Mathew Kaufman	September 5, 2008 (TIFF)/March 27, 2009 (USA)
2010	And Everything Is Going Fine	Steven Soderbergh	January 23, 2010 (Slamdance)
2011	Rejoice and Shout (Documentary)	Don McGlynn	June 3, 2011

=== Distribution ===
Originally formed in 2001 by Bill Banowsky and Eamonn Bowles, Magnolia Pictures is the home entertainment and theatrical distribution subsidiary of 2929. In November 2005 the company created Magnolia Home Entertainment to release its films over home video, with its first release being Alex Gibney's acclaimed doc, Enron: The Smartest Guys in the Room. It is headed by entertainment industry vet and former head of home entertainment for Miramax, Randy Wells. Magnolia Pictures also provides its content through a curated streaming service, Magnolia Selects.

2929 also launched Truly Indie, an "innovative distribution program" for independent filmmakers.

=== Television ===
2929 holds a significant interest in AXS TV, which Cuban originally co-founded in 2001 as the all-high definition cable channel HDNet (through AXS TV LLC, formerly HDNet, LLC). HDNet Movies, a companion channel, shows movies in high definition. 2929 also owned Rysher Entertainment, a television syndication distributor with an extensive library of titles and syndication rights to TV shows like Hogan's Heroes, Sex and the City and Star Search. Rysher was later acquired by an investment company through Lakeshore Entertainment.

== Former operations ==
=== Theatrical exhibition ===
2929 acquired Landmark Theatres September 24, 2003. The chain was originally founded by Kim Jorgensen in 1974 and specialized in independent and foreign films. On December 4, 2018 the announcement was made that Landmark Theatres was sold to the Cohen Media Group, "a buyer who is passionate about independent cinema and who truly understands this market."

2929 maintains an interest in Spotlight Cinema Networks, a cinema advertising company.
