= Kensington, San Diego =

- Community of San Diego
- Kensington
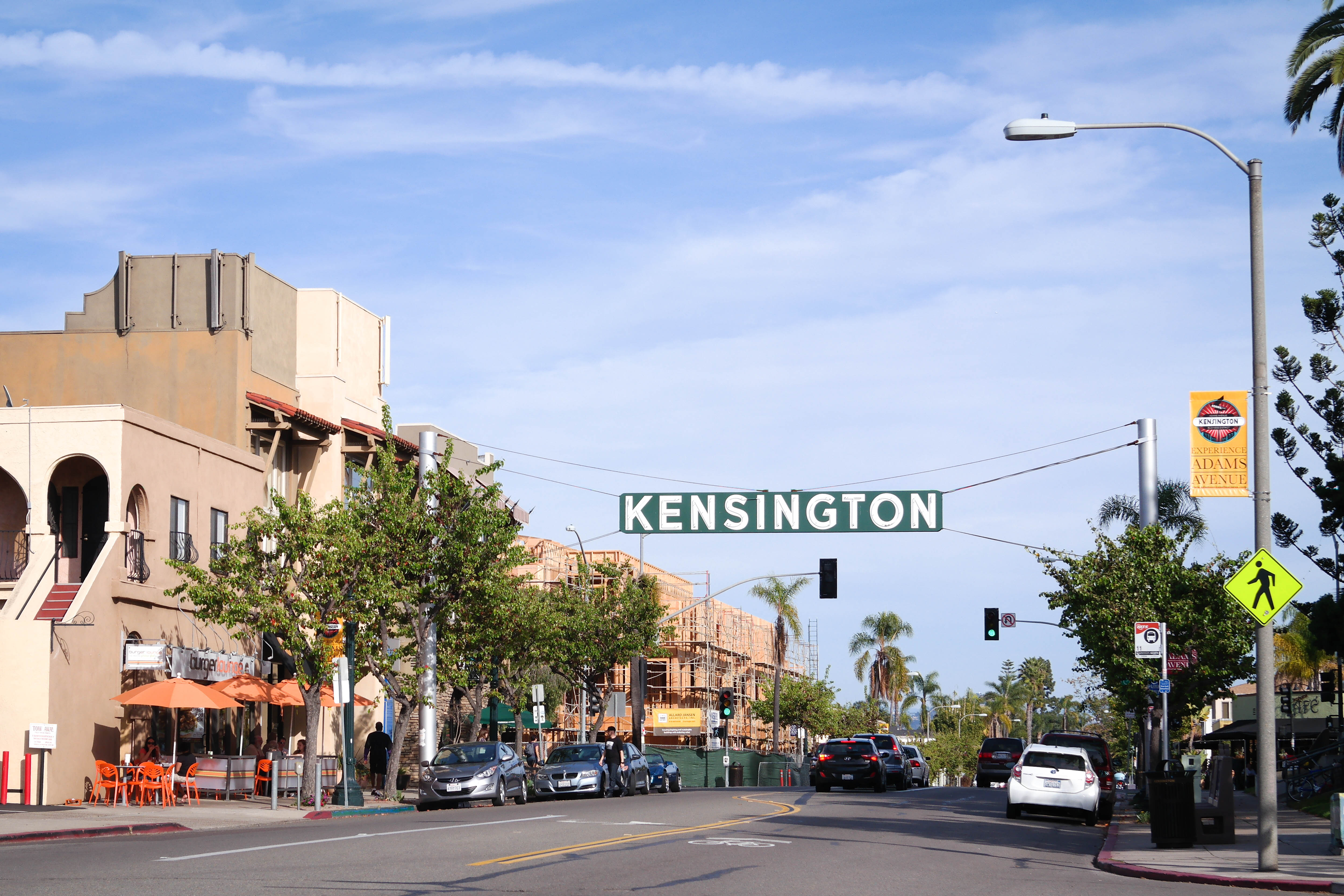
- A neon sign hangs over Adams Avenue, the main thoroughfare in Kensington.

- Location within Central San Diego Kensington, San Diego (California) Kensington, San Diego (the United States)
- Coordinates: 32.771399°N 117.10001°W
- Country: United States of America
- State: California
- County: San Diego
- City: San Diego

Kensington is a neighborhood in San Diego, California. Its borders are defined by Interstate 15 to the west, Interstate 8 to the north, Fairmount Avenue to the east, and El Cajon Boulevard to the south. Its neighboring communities are Normal Heights to the west, and City Heights to the south. Kensington is part of San Diego City Council District 9. In the United States House of Representatives, Kensington was in California's 53rd congressional district prior to decennial redistricting, represented by Democrat Sara Jacobs. Due to redistricting, it became part of the 51st district after the 2022 congressional election.

== History ==
Kensington was founded in 1910 when a map was filed on April 9, 1910. The map contains the name of two sisters who owned the land which became the Kensington Park subdivision. Abby (Hall) Hitchcock and Mary (Hall) Gleason inherited the ex-Rancho Mission land from the estate of their deceased brother and mother. Abby's husband was a realtor, and her brother-in-law was a land use attorney and early mover-and-shaker in San Diego. Through the Hitchcock brothers, a connection was made to William Douglas, a real estate promoter from Los Angeles. Douglas' name also appears on the original Kensington Park map.

William Douglas promoted the subdivision and handled the early sales of lots. A newspaper announcement heralded the opening of the Kensington Park subdivision for lot sales on November 25, 1910. The owners had managed to convince the officials of the San Diego Electric Railway company to extend the Adams Avenue trolley line into Kensington Park in time for the opening. The first houses began to be built in 1910 and were all of the Craftsman style. The original Kensington Park subdivision stretched from Ward Canyon on the west (now SR-15), to County Line Road (now 42nd Street) on the east, and from Monroe Avenue on the south to Jefferson Avenue on the north (now Alder Drive). Kensington Park was annexed to the City of San Diego in 1952.

Sometime in 1913, the two sisters sold their interest in the Kensington Park land to a consortium of former executives from the Santa Fe Railway Company, headed by G. Aubrey Davidson. Davidson redrew the map of Kensington Park and acquired more land to the north to develop Kensington Manor. Later subdivisions followed, including Kensington Heights, Kensington Park Annex. These areas today are known collectively as "Kensington".

From its beginnings in 1910, Kensington was serviced by route 11 of the San Diego Electric Railway ( SDERy ) via a wooden trestle bridge across Ward canyon. Automobile access from Adams was added in 1913 when a second bridge was built beside the first. During the time of that service, the line ran several historically notable streetcar designs including the San Diego Class 1 StreetCar, one of the first "pay as you enter" designs in the nation, and "The Presidents' Conference Committee" design, both built by the St. Louis Car Company. Streetcar service to the neighborhood continued until 1949 when the last of San Diego's street car lines were abandoned.

The name Kensington echoes the name of a district of west London. However, the origins of the name are in dispute, as the Hall sisters (Abbie Hitchcock and Mary Gleason) were originally from Natick, Massachusetts, an area where many of the street and town names resemble English place names, and some of which are echoed in Kensington street names. The area has kept its "small town" community feel ever since it was founded. Annual traditions include neighborhood-wide parties such as the Memorial Day Parade and the Fourth Of July Block Party/ Street Basketball Tournament. Also, most streets have their own "annual parties".

Ken Cinema in 2018

A neon "Kensington" sign hangs over Adams Avenue, which acts as the neighborhood's cultural and business center. This sign, after almost a year of needing repair (see picture to the right), was taken down to be replaced. However, the sign was one of only two original neon neighborhood signs remaining in San Diego, having been bought and installed by the community in 1953. A Kensington resident performed the necessary research and submitted it to the City of San Diego's Historical Resources Board for consideration as an historical resource. The HRB voted unanimously on April 24, 2008, to designate the "Kensington Neon Sign" as HRB historic site #865. As a designated historic resource, the sign had to be professionally evaluated for repair or replacement in accordance with the Secretary of the Interior Standards. The sign was found to be in repairable condition; however, the president of the Kensington Talmadge Community Association (KTCA), keepers of the sign, directed a neon sign company to dismantle the old sign, which effectively destroyed the structural integrity such that repair was no longer possible. The City's Historic Resources staff then directed the KTCA to replicate the original sign and install it back above Adams Avenue. The sign was re-installed in November 2010.

Many street names in the community have English (or New England) origins, as does the name Kensington itself. The residential area has an impressive collection of Spanish Revival style homes, this being the most popular style in San Diego during the late 1920s when much of Kensington was built out. Architects Cliff May and Richard Requa built important homes in Kensington, and Requa, in particular, had a profound influence on the architecture and character of the Kensington neighborhood. Kensington and Talmadge are sometimes, but not officially grouped together as one community for purposes to reflect higher real estate values.

== Education ==
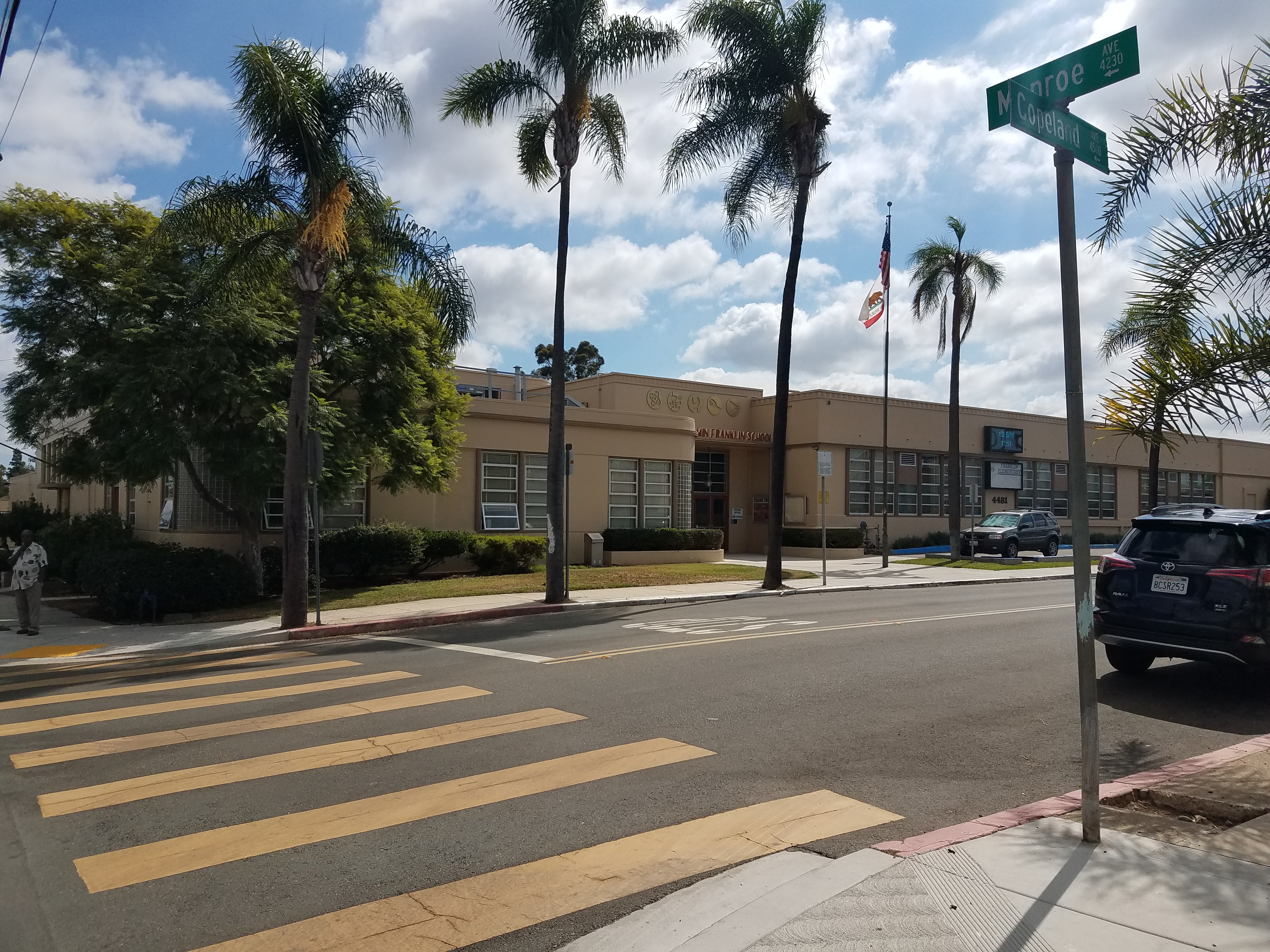
Franklin Elementary School

Franklin Elementary STEAM Magnet School (San Diego Unified School District) is a K-5 school located in Kensington.

== See also ==
- Ken Cinema
- Kensington Terrace
