= East Town Mall =

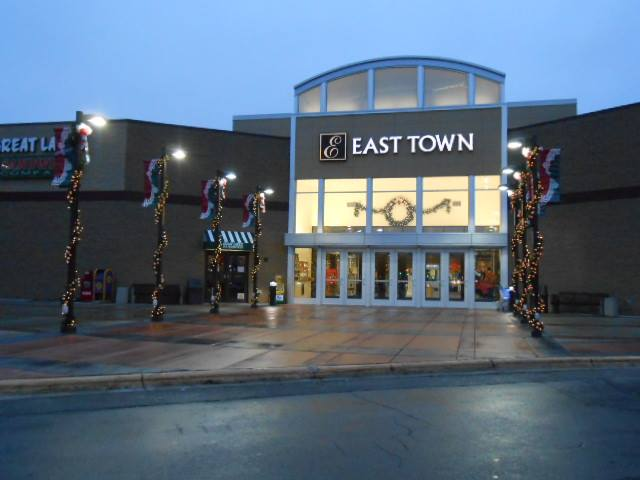
- Main entrance
- Location: Green Bay, Wisconsin, United States
- Coordinates: 44.4853°N 87.965°W
- Address: 2350 E. Mason Street
- Opened: October 1982, renovated in 1998 & 2010
- Closed: 2021 (indoor only)
- Developer: Center Companies
- Manager: Lexington Realty International
- Owner: Center Companies (1982-1994); Marlin Properties (1994-2001); Mid-America Group (2004-2007); Cabot Investment Properties (2007-2014); Jones Lang LaSalle (2014-2016); Lexington Realty International & Case Equity Partners (2016-present)
- Num. of stores: 27
- Num. of anchor tenants: 10 (7 open, 3 vacant)
- Floor area: 283,216 sq ft (26,311.6 m^{2})
- Floors: 1
- Parking: 1,312 spaces
- Public transit: Green Bay Metro (Route 71 & QB Sneak [Only available on Green Bay Packers home games])
- Website: lexingtonco.com/project/east-town/

East Town Mall was an enclosed shopping mall owned by Lexington Realty International and Case Equity Partners, in Green Bay, Wisconsin in the United States. It is the only enclosed shopping mall within the city of Green Bay. In 2021, the traditional mall interior was closed as part of the redevelopment, while remaining retailers including Bath & Body Works and Consign It continued operating with exterior-only entrances.

== History ==
A mall on the east side of Green Bay was first proposed in 1980 by Dayton-Hudson Properties. The original name of the mall was the East Towne Fashion Square, and was planned as a 575,000 square foot shopping mall. Economic uncertainty in the early 1980s contributed to the scaling down of the mall project by about half of the planned size.

East Town Mall opened in October 1982 by the Center Companies. It was the third shopping mall in the Green Bay area. Original anchors included Kohl's (on the east side where Hobby Lobby currently resides) and Prange Way. Other original stores included Braun's Fashions, Maurices, The Athlete's Foot, Radioshack, and Regis Salon.

In 1995, Prange Way closed following the bankruptcy of the company. Soon after, Kohl's moved across the mall into the former Prange Way space. A remodel of the mall took place shortly after, creating space for a new OfficeMax out of the west side courtyard and vacant retail space. The mall was expanded to create a new corridor to connect to the new Kohl's location, creating new retail space.

Original East Town Mall logo

The mall enjoyed new success in the late 1990s, as Hobby Lobby took over the old Kohl's anchor location, and Toy Works, Schlotzsky's, and Fashion Bug opened new locations in the mall. A new Budget Cinema was also carved out of several vacant spaces at the back end of the mall.

In 2007, Cabot Investment Properties purchased the mall for $12 million.

In 2010, the mall was given a new front entryway and street signs. The interior of the mall and the center court were also renovated. Seven Windspire Energy wind turbines were added to the front plaza, which helps to reduce the energy costs of the mall.

In 2017, Silver Cinemas closed their East Town Mall location.

=== Ponzi scheme ===
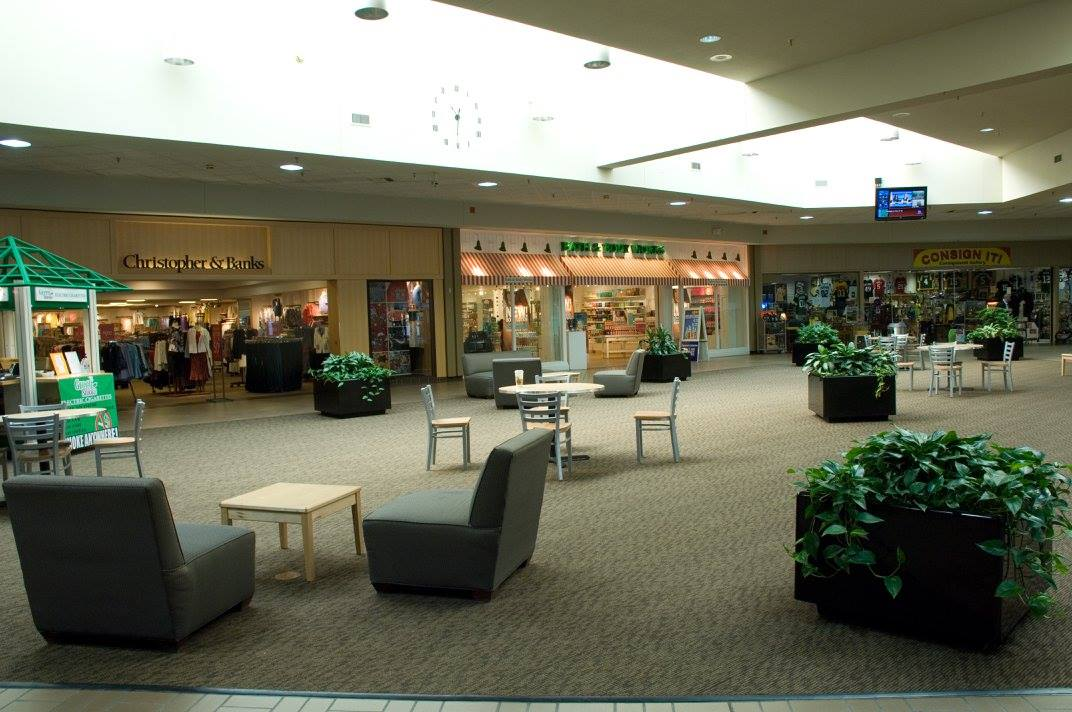
Center court in East Town Mall in Green Bay, Wisconsin.

In 2014, Massachusetts secretary of the commonwealth William Galvin filed fraud charges against Cabot Investment Properties, accusing them of operating a ponzi scheme. In the preceding years, the owners of Cabot Investment Properties had embezzled over $9 million. Local investors, many of whom were retired or elderly, had each paid $213,000 for a three percent ownership stake in the mall, which was then lost due to embezzlement.

After Cabot Investment Properties defaulted, the court placed the mall in receivership, with Jones Lang LaSalle being appointed as the receiving owner.

=== Redevelopment ===
In 2016, Lexington Realty International and Case Equity Partners purchased East Town Mall, and plan to redevelop the mall into a regional power center. The renovation, which would total $12 million, was approved by the Green Bay City Council on November 14, 2016. Planned tenants included a Fresh Thyme Farmers Market grocery store and a new branch of the Brown County Library. In 2021, local developer Garritt Bader announced plans to redevelop 14 acres of the property with a mix of retail stores and the development of production and industrial warehouse facilities. During the 2021 redevelopment, the traditional interior mall was closed and the property's retail layout was converted to exterior-facing storefronts. Bath & Body Works and Consign It, the final two retailers operating from the interior, continued with exterior-only entrances. Planet Fitness was announced as a new tenant, while much of the former mall building was being converted for use by American Tent, including production space in the rear portion of the property. By October 2021, the redevelopment had converted the traditional interior-mall format to exterior-only storefronts, and the developer's investment in the former mall property had increased from $5 million to $15 million. Additional buildings were also planned for portions of the parking lots.
