= Todd Wagner =

American entrepreneur (born 1960)

- Born: August 2, 1960 (age 66); Gary, Indiana, U.S.
- Education: Kelley School of Business; University of Virginia
- Occupations: CEO of Charity Network; Co-owner of 2929 Entertainment

Todd R. Wagner (born August 2, 1960) is an American entrepreneur, co-founder of Broadcast.com and founder and CEO of a company called Charity Network which organizes regular fund raisings. He also co-owns 2929 Entertainment with Mark Cuban, along with other entertainment companies.

== Early life ==
Wagner was born in Gary, Indiana. He attended Merrillville High School and then the Kelley School of Business at Indiana University Bloomington, joining Kappa Sigma fraternity Beta Theta chapter.

He graduated from Indiana University in 1983. He earned a Juris Doctor from University of Virginia, then moved to Dallas, Texas, where he became a licensed CPA. He began a legal career with the national firms Akin, Gump, Strauss, Hauer & Feld and Hopkins & Sutter.

== Career ==
=== Broadcast.com ===
In 1995, Wagner launched AudioNet with Mark Cuban, a platform for broadcasting live sporting events and radio stations over the internet. As CEO, Wagner grew the company and expanded its services to include corporate events and business services.

In 1998 Wagner and Cuban changed the name to Broadcast.com and took the company public in the midst of the dot-com boom. The Broadcast.com IPO set an opening-day record, with shares climbing 249% from an offering price of $18 to a closing price of $62.75.

In 1999, Wagner and Cuban sold Broadcast.com to Yahoo! for $5.7 billion, making 300 employees millionaires (briefly, on paper) and Wagner and Cuban instant billionaires. Wagner continued to lead the division as Yahoo! Broadcast until May 2000, when he declined an offer to become Yahoo!'s Chief Operating Officer to focus on other interests.

=== 2929 Entertainment ===
Using the success of Broadcast.com, Wagner built the Wagner/Cuban Companies including 2929 Productions. Two films the company helped produce received Oscar nominations: (Good Night, and Good Luck and Enron: The Smartest Guys in the Room). Other films include Akeelah and the Bee and The Road. Good Night, and Good Luck, directed by and co-starring George Clooney, was nominated for six Academy Awards including Best Picture.

Through 2929 Entertainment, Wagner and Mark Cuban have owned a group of vertically integrated entertainment properties including high-definition production company HDNet Films (produced the Academy Award–nominated documentary Enron: The Smartest Guys in the Room); distributor Magnolia Pictures (released Enron and Oscar-nominated Capturing the Friedmans); home video division Magnolia Home Entertainment; the Landmark Theatres art-house chain which was sold in 2018; and high-definition cable channels HDNet and HDNet Movies now AXS TV.

=== Other business ventures ===
Wagner also has a stake in the Dallas Mavericks, and he continues to invest in and nurture start-ups. Additionally, Wagner and Mark Cuban were the original investors in Content Partners LLC, a company that invests in the back-end profit participations of Hollywood talent. As of 2019, Wagner remained an equity partner.

Additionally Wagner serves on the American Film Institute's Board of Trustees.

In June 2015, it was announced that Wagner had acquired the celebrity charitable fundraising platform Prizeo for an undisclosed sum.

Wagner's latest project is FoodFight USA, a nationwide grassroots campaign to clean up America's tainted food supply. In an early win, he influenced the passing of the California Food Safety Act in October 2023.

=== Charity Network ===
In 2014, Wagner launched Chideo, a digital platform designed to raise funds and awareness for causes by connecting fans to celebrities through exclusive video content. Over the next two years, Wagner expanded the concept through the acquisition of online sweepstakes platform Prizeo in June 2015, and online charity auction site Charitybuzz in October 2015.

In 2016, Wagner announced the formation of Charity Network, parent company to Charitybuzz, Prizeo and Chideo, with a mission to help charities transition from analog to digital. The company uses celebrities, technology and the media to raise awareness for its customers.

In February 2017, Charity Network was named one of Fast Company's 2017 Most Innovative Companies by a website called Fast Company.
