= HDNet Movies =

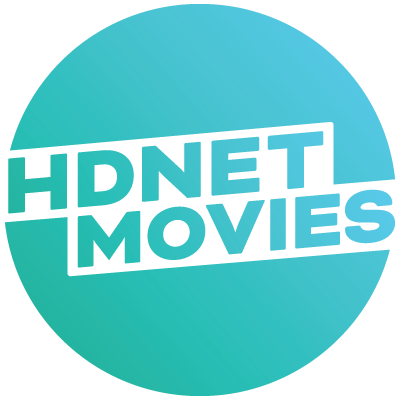
- Country: United States
- Broadcast area: National
- Headquarters: Denver, Colorado

Programming
- Language: English
- Picture format: 1080i (HDTV)

Ownership
- Owner: Anthem Sports & Entertainment
- Parent: HDNet LLC (AXS TV LLC)
- Sister channels: AXS TV

History
- Launched: January 13, 2003; 23 years ago

Links
- Website: www.hdnetmovies.com

HDNet Movies is an American digital cable and satellite television network launched by Mark Cuban in January 2003 as a spin-off of HDNet (now AXS TV). It is currently majority-owned by Canadian-based Anthem Sports & Entertainment through HDNet LLC, a subsidiary of AXS TV LLC.

HDNet Movies features theatrically released films and documentaries. Programming showcases a wide variety of films including Academy Award winners, action films, scifi films, westerns, and more.

== History and Programming ==
=== 2016 ===
In celebration of the 50th anniversary of Star Trek in 2016, HDNet Movies aired a marathon of films from the franchise on Memorial Day, May 30, 2016. The marathon featured Star Trek: The Motion Picture, Star Trek II: The Wrath of Khan, Star Trek III: The Search for Spock, Star Trek V: The Final Frontier, and Star Trek: Insurrection.

On July 4, 2016, the network aired a 24-hour western movie marathon that featured classics such as The Life and Times of Judge Roy Bean starring Paul Newman, Bad Day at Black Rock starring Spencer Tracy and Robert Ryan, A Big Hand for the Little Lady starring Henry Fonda, Hombre starring Newman, Cimarron starring Glenn Ford, and more.

In July 2016, HDNet Movies presented its first-ever celebrity-hosted program when Rock and Roll Hall of Famer Graham Nash of Crosby, Stills, Nash & Young hosted Graham Nash Presents 9 Days of Rock Docs. The television event featured two rock music-themed documentaries in primetime across nine nights accompanied by hosted wraps and stories from Nash about the artists featured in the documentaries. The marathon included 13 different documentaries, several of which were television premieres, highlight artists such as The Allman Brothers Band, Rush, Eric Clapton, Van Morrison, Bob Dylan and more.

The network celebrated The Master of Suspense Alfred Hitchcock's birthday with a 48-hour marathon Aug. 13 and 14, featuring 17 of his films including Vertigo, Psycho, Rear Window, The Man Who Knew Too Much and The Birds, among others.

On Sunday, Nov. 6, the weekend before Election Day, Dan Rather hosted a movie marathon featuring politically-themed movies. Rather filmed wraparound vignettes that ran throughout the marathon recounting his experiences surrounding past Presidents and Presidential elections. Movies airing as part of the marathon included Welcome to Mooseport, True Colors, The Sentinel, The Ides of March, Primary Colors, In the Line of Fire and Bob Roberts.

In December 2016, STYX's Tommy Shaw hosted the network's holiday event "Not So Silent Nights" featuring seven nights of music-themed films paired with rock documentaries in primetime. Pairings included Tommy with The Kids Are Alright and Janis with Graffiti Bridge, among others.

=== 2017 ===
To celebrate the 89th Academy Awards, HDNet Movies announced a month-long, 40-film line-up of Oscar-winning films called "And the Oscar Goes To" hosted by film critic Richard Roeper. The television event features at least one different film in primetime every night beginning Jan. 29 and finishing with a weekend-long marathon Feb. 24-26 leading up to the awards show. Films in the event include modern films such as Slumdog Millionaire, Blue Jasmine, There Will Be Blood, and Million Dollar Baby, and classics such as Lilies of the Field, The Defiant Ones, Who's Afraid of Virginia Woolf?, and Funny Girl.

HDNet Movies tapped Jim Breuer to host a week-long event of films starring former cast members of Saturday Night Live in March. The line-up included films starring Breuer, Will Ferrell, John Belushi, Chevy Chase, Gilda Radner, Chris Farley, Eddie Murphy, Billy Crystal, Dan Aykroyd, Bill Murray, Kristen Wiig, Amy Poehler, Tina Fey and many more.

In May, the network aired a marathon of all seven Police Academy films, hosted by franchise star Michael Winslow.

HDNet Movies dedicated the entire month of June to celebrating classic films from the 1980s with a "Totally 80's Month." The month-long event was hosted by Judge Reinhold and featured a different 1980s film every night in primetime. Featured films included St. Elmo’s Fire, Throw Momma from the Train, The Big Chill, Teen Wolf, Arthur and The Outsiders, among 31 total during the month.

On August 17, HDNet Movies announced Rob Zombie will host the network's Halloween movie event, Rob Zombie's 13 Nights of Halloween, from Oct. 19 to 31.

The network tapped two-time Academy Award-nominee Bruce Dern to host a week of western movie classics Thanksgiving week November 20–26 in "Bruce Dern's Cowboy Collection."

=== 2018 ===
HDNet Movies expanded upon its previous year's Oscar movie event "And The Oscar Goes To" with 32 days of nothing but Academy Award-winning films airing 24 hours a day from February 1 to March 4. The 75-film line-up is once again hosted by Richard Roeper.

In celebration of what would have been John Wayne's 111th birthday May 26, the network tapped his son Ethan Wayne to host a "Western Icons" event from May 18–28 featuring films starring John Wayne, Clint Eastwood, Randolph Scott, Gary Cooper, Gregory Peck, Sidney Poitier and others.

Musician, composer and drummer for The Police, Stewart Copeland, hosted a music documentary event "Classic Rock Week with Stewart Copeland" from July 16–22. The event began with a special airing of Copeland's documentary Everyone Stares: The Police Inside Out on July 16.

=== 2019 to present ===
On September 9, 2019, Canadian company Anthem Sports & Entertainment announced that it had acquired a majority stake in AXS TV and HDNet Movies. Mark Cuban would retain interest as a minority equity partner.
