= Mark Cuban =

American businessman (born 1958)

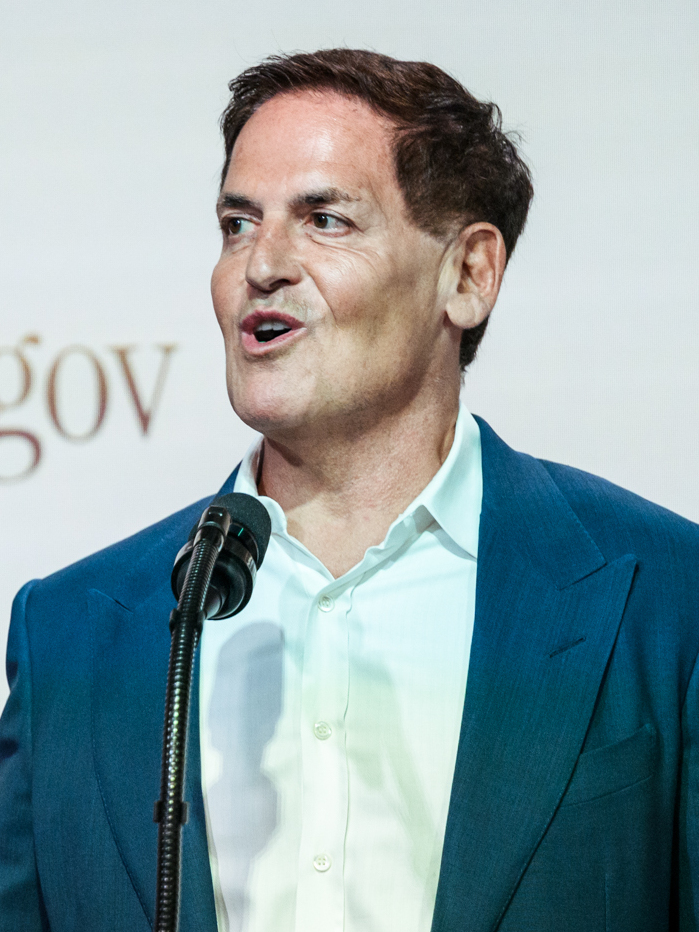
- Cuban in 2026
- Born: July 31, 1958 (age 68); Pittsburgh, Pennsylvania, U.S.
- Education: Indiana University Bloomington (BS)
- Occupations: Businessman; investor; television presenter
- Known for: Ownership of the Dallas Mavericks; Investor on Shark Tank
- Title: Minority owner of the Dallas Mavericks; Founder of AXS TV & HDNet; Co-founder of 2929 Entertainment; Co-founder of Cost Plus Drugs; Owner of Mustang, Texas; Co-owner of Brondell
- Political party: Independent
- Spouse: Tiffany Stewart (m. 2002)
- Children: 3
- Relatives: Brian Cuban (brother)
- Awards: NBA Champion (2011)
- Website: markcubancompanies.com

Mark Cuban (born July 31, 1958) is an American businessman, entrepreneur, and television personality. He is the former principal owner and current minority owner of the Dallas Mavericks of the National Basketball Association (NBA) and co-owner of 2929 Entertainment. From 2012 to 2025, he was one of the "sharks" on the ABC reality television series Shark Tank.

Born in Pittsburgh, Pennsylvania, and raised in the suburb of Mt. Lebanon, Cuban was involved in ventures from a young age, from selling garbage bags to later running newspapers during a Pittsburgh Post-Gazette worker's strike. He graduated from the Kelley School of Business at Indiana University Bloomington and embarked on a diverse business career that included founding MicroSolutions and Broadcast.com, both of which he sold at substantial profits, the latter being sold to Yahoo! Inc., making Cuban a billionaire. In 2002, the service was discontinued.

Cuban's investments span various industries, from technology and media to sports and entertainment. He has been a prominent figure in the NBA, known for his involvement with the Mavericks (including their 2011 NBA championship) and disputes with the league's management. In his side ventures, Cuban has been involved in philanthropy, political commentary, and reality television.

As of January 2026, Forbes has estimated his net worth to be US$6 billion.

== Early life and education ==
Cuban was born in Pittsburgh, Pennsylvania on July 31, 1958. His father, Norton Cuban, was an automobile upholsterer. He described his mother, Shirley (née Feldman), as someone with "a different job or different career goal every other week."

Cuban is Jewish. He grew up in Mt. Lebanon, an affluent suburb of Pittsburgh, in a working-class family. His paternal grandfather changed the surname from "Chabenisky" to "Cuban" after his family emigrated from Russian Empire (modern territory of Ukraine) through Ellis Island. His maternal grandfather was a Bessarabian Jewish immigrant and his maternal grandmother was from Lithuania.

Cuban first ventured into business at age of 12. He sold garbage bags to pay for a pair of expensive sneakers. A few years later, he earned money by selling stamps and coins. At age 16, Cuban took advantage of a Pittsburgh Post-Gazette strike by running newspapers from Cleveland to Pittsburgh.

Instead of completing his senior year of at Mt. Lebanon High School, he enrolled as a full-time student at the University of Pittsburgh, where he became a member of the Pi Lambda Phi fraternity. After one year at the University of Pittsburgh, Cuban transferred to Indiana University in Bloomington, Indiana, where he graduated from the Kelley School of Business in 1981 with a Bachelor of Science degree in management. He chose Indiana's Kelley School of Business without even visiting the campus because it "had the least expensive tuition of all the business schools on the top 10 list". He had various business ventures during college, including a bar, disco lessons, and a chain letter.

After graduating, Cuban returned to Pittsburgh and took a job with Mellon Bank, where he worked converting the old manual process at smaller regional banks to new computerized systems.

== Business career ==
In 1982, Cuban moved to Dallas, Texas, where he first found a job as a bartender for a Greenville Avenue bar called Elan and then as a salesperson for Your Business Software, one of the earliest PC software retailers in Dallas. He was fired less than a year later, after meeting with a client to procure new business instead of opening the store.

Cuban co-founded MicroSolutions with support from his previous customers at Your Business Software. Initially, MicroSolutions operated as a systems integrator and software reseller. The company was an early proponent of technologies such as Carbon Copy, Lotus Notes, and CompuServe. One of the company's largest clients was Perot Systems. The company grew to more than $30 million in revenue, and in 1990, Cuban sold MicroSolutions to CompuServe—then a subsidiary of H&R Block—for $6 million (over $14.7 million today). He made approximately $2 million after taxes on the deal.

=== Audionet and Broadcast.com ===
In 1995, Cuban and fellow Indiana University alumnus Todd Wagner joined Audionet (founded in 1989 by Chris Jaeb who retained 10% of the company), combining their mutual interest in Indiana Hoosiers college basketball and webcasting. With a single server and an ISDN line, Audionet became Broadcast.com in 1998. By 1999, Broadcast.com had grown to 330 employees and $13.5 million in revenue for the second quarter. In 1999, Broadcast.com helped launch the first live-streamed Victoria's Secret Fashion Show. That year, during the dot com boom, Broadcast.com was acquired by Yahoo! for $5.7 billion in Yahoo! stock.

Yahoo!'s costly purchase of Broadcast.com is now regarded as one of the worst internet acquisitions of all time. Broadcast.com and Yahoo!'s other broadcasting services were discontinued within a few years after the acquisition. Cuban has repeatedly described himself as very lucky to have sold the company before the dot-com bubble burst. However, he also emphasized that he hedged against the Yahoo! shares he received from the sale and would have lost most of his fortune if he had not done so.

Cuban continued to work with Wagner in another venture, 2929 Entertainment, which provides vertically integrated production and distribution of films and video.

On September 24, 2003, the firm purchased Landmark Theatres, a chain of 58 arthouse movie theaters. The company is also responsible for the updated version of the TV show Star Search, which was broadcast on CBS. 2929 Entertainment released Bubble, a movie directed by Steven Soderbergh, in 2006.

=== Investments in startups ===
Cuban has also assisted ventures in the social software and distributed networking industries. He was an owner of IceRocket, a search engine that scours the blogosphere for content.

In 2005, Cuban invested $1.7 million in file-sharing company Red Swoosh, co-founded by Travis Kalanick, providing much-needed capital to the company after the early 2000s recession. Red Swoosh was acquired by Akamai for $19 million in 2007. Kalanick later approached Cuban in 2009 to invest in his next venture Uber at a $10 million valuation. Cuban proposed a $5 million valuation, but never heard back from Kalanick.

He was also an investor in Weblogs, Inc., which was acquired by AOL.

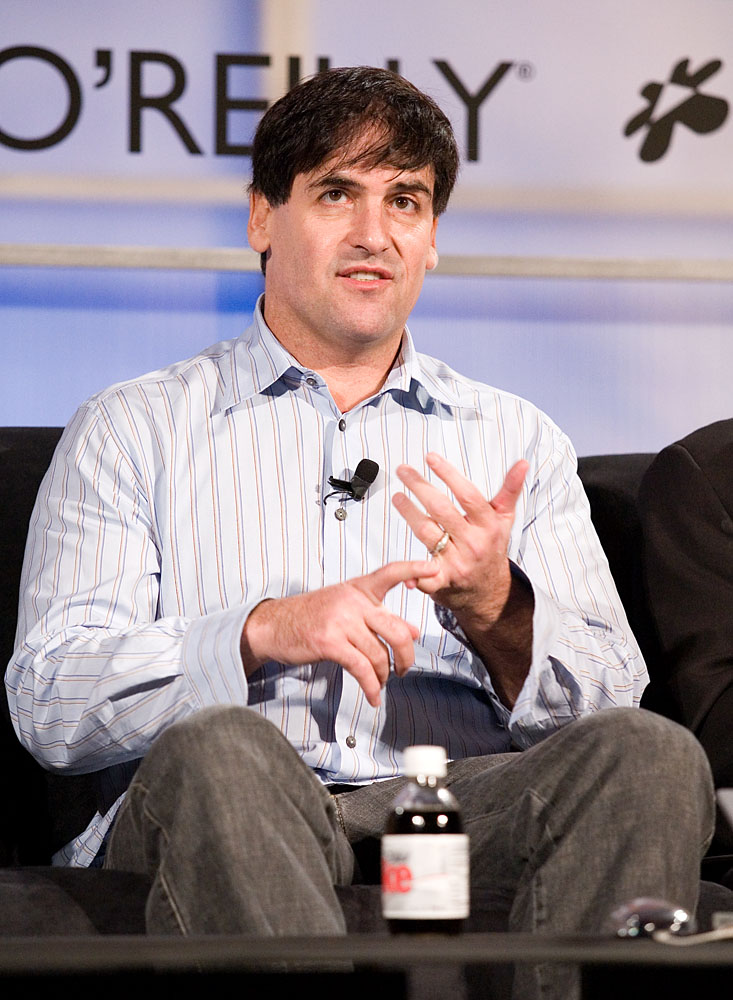
Cuban at the Web 2.0 Conference in 2005

In 2005, Cuban invested in Brondell Inc., a San Francisco startup making a high-tech toilet seat called a Swash that works like a bidet but mounts on a standard toilet. "People tend to approach technology the same way, whether it's in front of them, or behind them", Cuban joked. He also invested in Goowy Media Inc., a San Diego Internet software startup. In April 2006, Sirius Satellite Radio announced that Cuban would host his own weekly radio talk show, Mark Cuban's Radio Maverick. However, the show has not materialized.

In July 2006, Cuban financed Sharesleuth.com, a website created by former St. Louis Post-Dispatch investigative reporter Christopher Carey to uncover fraud and misinformation in publicly traded companies. Experimenting with a new business model for making online journalism financially viable, Cuban disclosed that he would take positions in the shares of companies mentioned in Sharesleuth.com in advance of publication. Business and legal analysts questioned the appropriateness of shorting a stock before making public pronouncements which are likely to result in losses in that stock's value. Cuban insisted that the practice is legal in view of full disclosure.

In April 2007, Cuban partnered with Mascot Books to publish his first children's book, Let's Go, Mavs!. In November 2011, he wrote a 30,000-word e-book (60 to 120 pages), How to Win at the Sport of Business: If I Can Do It, You Can Do It, which he described as "a way to get motivated".

In October 2008, Cuban started Bailoutsleuth.com as a "non-profit, non-partisan investigative reporting site" for oversight of the U.S. government's $700 billion "bailout" of financial institutions. It no longer exists as a website.

In September 2010, Cuban provided an undisclosed amount of venture capital to store-front analytics company Motionloft. According to the company's CEO Jon Mills, he cold-emailed Cuban on a whim with the business proposition and said Cuban quickly responded that he would like to hear more. Mills credited that sentence for launching the company. In November 2013, several investors questioned Cuban about Mills' representation of a pending acquisition of Motionloft. Cuban denied an acquisition was in place. Mills was terminated as CEO of Motionloft by stockholders on December 1, 2013, and in February 2014 was arrested by the FBI and charged with wire fraud; it was alleged that Mills misrepresented to investors that Motionloft was going to be acquired by Cisco. Cuban has gone on record to state that the technology, which at least in part is meant to serve the commercial real estate industry, is "game changing" for tenants.

In 2019, Cuban, Ashton Kutcher, Steve Watts and Watts' wife Angela acquired a 50% stake in Veldskoen Shoes' United States business. In 2021, Cuban, Pantera Capital, BlockTower, Hashed, Cadenza Ventures (backed by 100x Group), CMS and QCP Capital backed a layer-2 decentralized exchange protocol, Injective Protocol and their CEO Eric Chen. Also in late 2021, Cuban purchased the entire town of Mustang, Texas, a 77-acre town in Navarro County. He told the Dallas Morning News that a friend needed to sell it, and "I don't know what if anything I will do with it."

Cuban has served as a spokesperson and investor in ZenBusiness, an online platform for business formation and compliance, since 2021. He participated in the company's $200 million Series C funding round that year and has appeared in promotional content and events on behalf of the company.

=== Shark Tank ===
Cuban became a "shark" investor on the ABC reality program Shark Tank for season two in 2011.

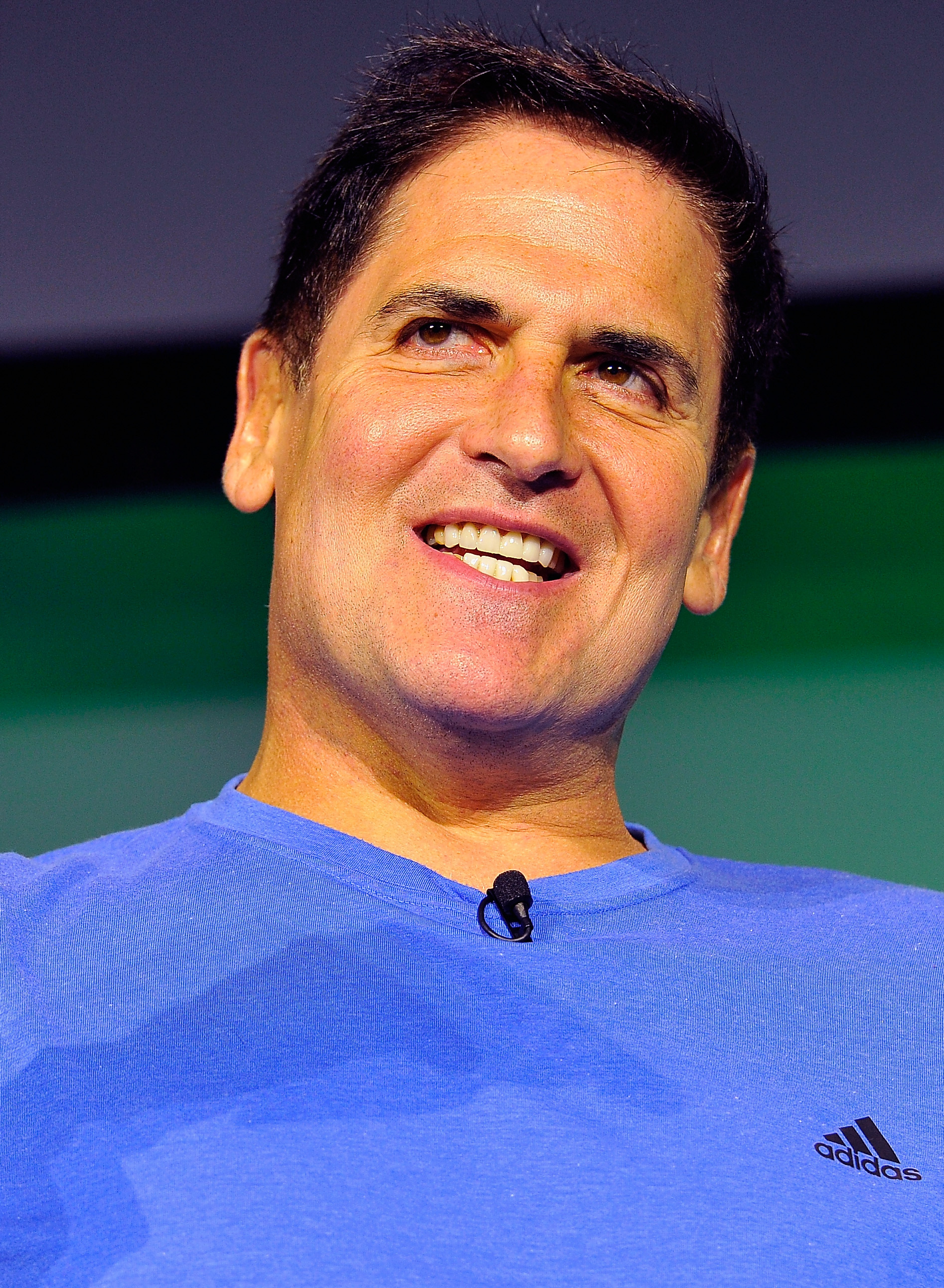
Cuban at TechCrunch Disrupt in 2014

As of May 2015, he has invested in 85 deals across 111 Shark Tank episodes, for a total of $19.9 million. In 2022, Cuban stated that his portfolio of Shark Tank investments had made a net loss, saying "I've gotten beat".

The actual numbers may vary because the investment happens after the handshake deal on live television and after due diligence is performed to ensure the accuracy of the information presented in the pitch room. For instance, Hy-Conn, a manufacturer of fire hose adapters, after agreeing to a deal of $1.25 million for 100% of the company with Cuban, did not go through with the deal.

Cuban's top three deals, all with at least $1 million invested, are Ten Thirty One Productions, Rugged Maniac Obstacle Race, and BeatBox Beverages.

Since Cuban joined the show in 2011, the ratings for Shark Tank have increased, and also during his tenure, the show has won four Primetime Emmy Awards for Outstanding Structured Reality Program (from 2014 to 2017). Before the category came into existence it won the award for outstanding reality program for two consecutive seasons (2012 to 2013), all of these awards came after he joined. Cuban was the richest of all Sharks to appear on the show, until Michael Rubin and Todd Graves came onto the show in seasons 15 and 16 respectively.

He announced in November 2023 that the show's 16th season would be his last.

=== Magnolia Pictures ===
Cuban owns film distributor Magnolia Pictures. Through Magnolia, he financed Redacted, a fictional dramatization based on the 2006 Mahmudiyah killings, written and directed by Brian De Palma. In September 2007, Cuban, in his capacity as owner of Magnolia Pictures, removed disturbing photographs from the concluding moments of the film Redacted, citing copyrights/permissions issues.

In April 2011, Cuban put Magnolia Pictures and Landmark Theatres up for sale, but said, "If we don't get the price and premium we want, we are happy to continue to make money from the properties."

=== Cryptocurrency ===
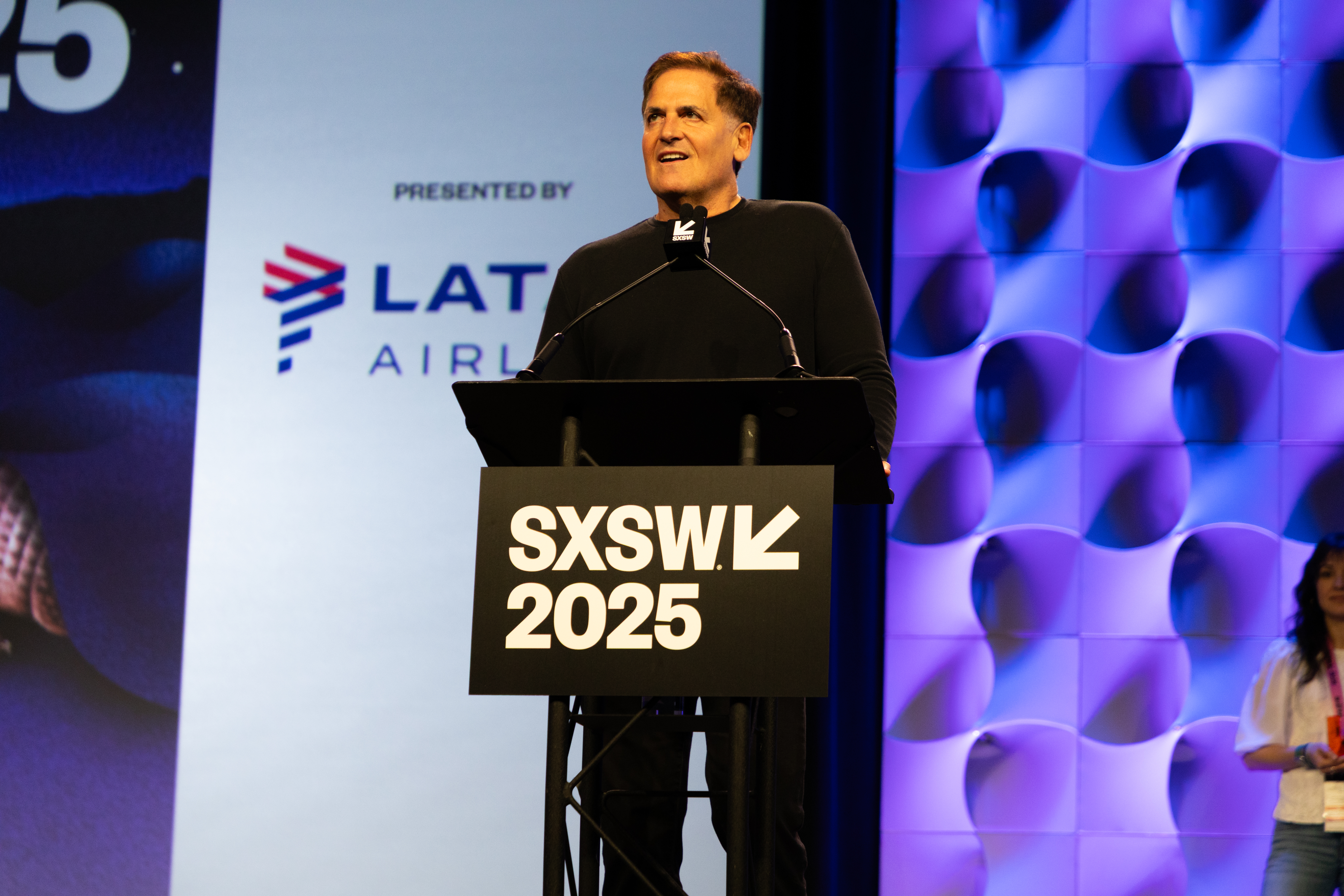
Cuban at SXSW 2025

Cuban has invested in the cryptocurrency Dogecoin, as well as accepting the particular cryptocurrency as a method of payment for Dallas Mavericks merchandise and tickets since at least early 2021. After being asked by CNBC for his thoughts on the payment method, Cuban responded, "It's a medium that can be used for the acquisition of goods and services. The community for doge is the strongest when it comes to using it as a medium of exchange."

After Voyager Digital, a cryptocurrency lender, filed for Chapter 11 bankruptcy protection in July 2022, Cuban and the Dallas Mavericks were named in a class-action lawsuit that alleged that Voyager Digital was a Ponzi scheme the following month due to Cuban's promotion of Voyager and Voyager's sponsorship with the team. In February 2022, the U.S. 11th Circuit Court of Appeals ruled in a lawsuit against Bitconnect that the Securities Act of 1933 extends to targeted solicitation using social media.

In September 2023, Cuban's MetaMask cryptocurrency wallet was drained by scammers. As a result, he had lost about $870,000 worth of tokens.

=== Cost Plus Drugs ===
In January 2022, Cuban launched Cost Plus Drugs, with the aim of lowering generic drug prices for end consumers in the U.S. Cuban started the company after receiving an email from a radiologist named Alex Oshmyansky, who pitched the idea of an online-based pharmacy. He often refers to Cost Plus Drugs as a critique and disruptor of the US healthcare system, including offering transparent, direct-to-consumer pricing and reducing the role of pharmacy benefit managers.

In 2025, Cuban announced partnerships with Cost Plus Drugs would include TrumpRx and Humana. In 2026, Cuban publicly highlighted the case of Payton Herres, a heart-transplant recipient who had faced insurance and cost barriers to accessing everolimus, an anti-rejection medication. Herres came close to exhausting her medication supply while trying to resolve the coverage problem. Mary Cutter, whose son donated the heart Herres received, offered to pay for the medication herself so Herres could continue taking it. After the case gained attention online, Cuban criticized the situation and Cost Plus Drugs subsequently provided Herres with a lower-cost supply of everolimus. The cost of that supply was covered through Coverage Fund, an initiative involving Claimable, Mark Cuban Companies, and Hacking Medicine Institute.

== Sports businesses ==
=== Dallas Mavericks ===
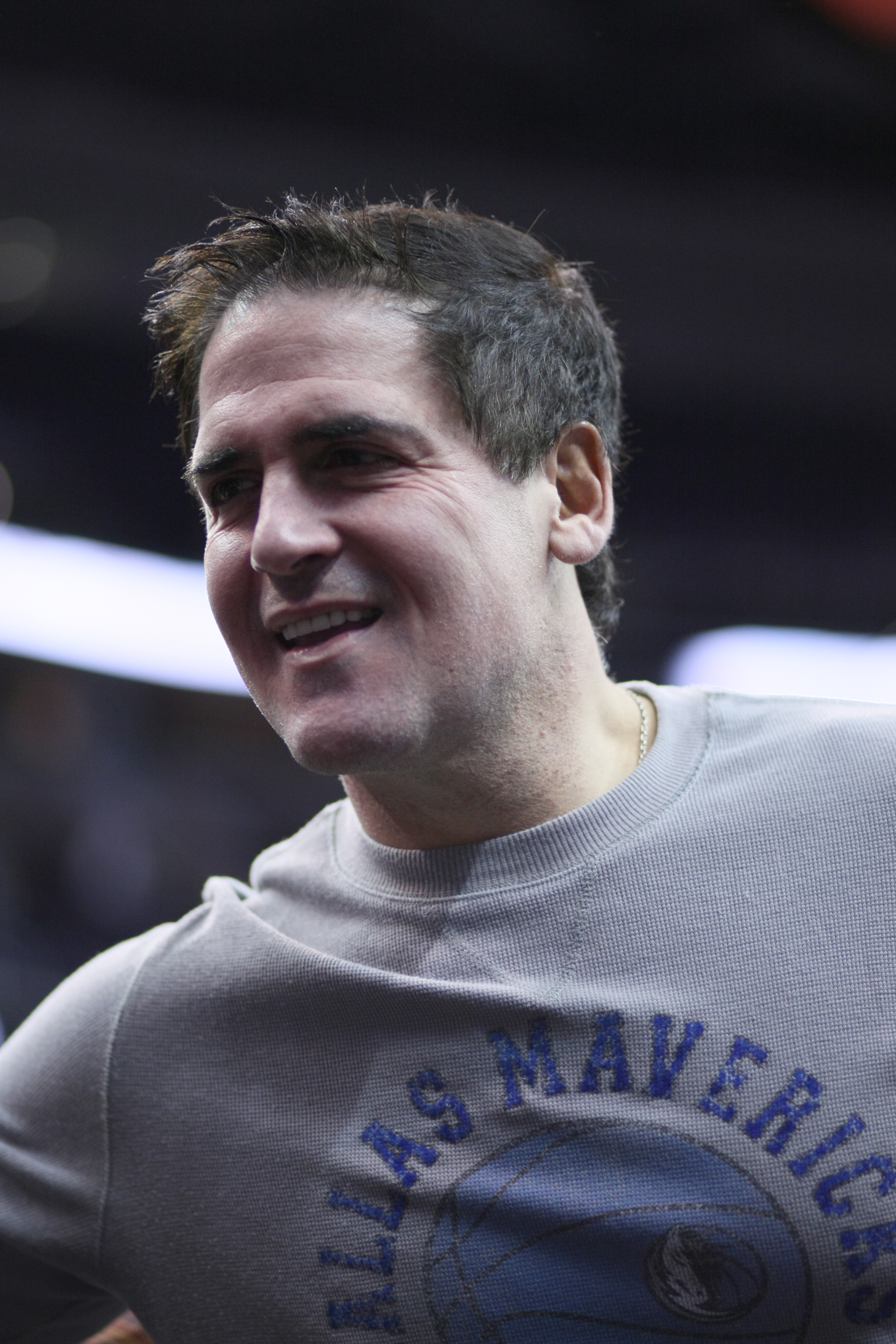
Cuban as owner of the Dallas Mavericks in 2008

On January 4, 2000, Cuban purchased a majority stake in the NBA's Dallas Mavericks for $285 million from H. Ross Perot Jr.

In the 20 years before Cuban bought the team, the Mavericks won only 40% of their games and had a playoff record of 21–32. In the 10 years following, the team won 69% of their regular season games and reached the playoffs in each of those seasons except for one. The Mavericks' playoff record with Cuban is 49–57, including their first trip to the NBA Finals in 2006, where they lost to the Miami Heat.

NBA team owners historically play more passive roles and watch basketball games from skyboxes; Cuban, however, sits alongside fans while donning team jerseys. Cuban travels in his private airplane—a Gulfstream V—to attend road games.

In May 2010, Perot, who retained 5% ownership, filed a lawsuit against Cuban, alleging the franchise was insolvent or in imminent danger of insolvency. In June 2010, Cuban responded in a court filing maintaining Perot is wrongly seeking money to offset some $100 million in losses on the Victory Park real estate development. The lawsuit was dismissed in 2011, due in part to Cuban asserting proper management of the team due to its recent victory in the 2011 NBA Finals. In 2014, the 5th Circuit Court affirmed that decision on appeal. Following his initial defeat, Perot attempted to shut out Mavericks fans from use of the parking lots he controlled near the American Airlines Center.

In January 2018, Cuban announced the Mavericks would be accepting Bitcoin as payment for tickets in the following season. On March 4, 2021, Cuban announced the Mavericks would begin accepting Dogecoin as payment for both merchandise as well as tickets to games.

In early 2021, he decided to stop playing the National Anthem at Dallas Mavericks games in order to "respect those who believed the anthem did not represent them." He also supported the movement as far back as late 2020. The NBA responded by requiring every team to play it, citing it as their "long-standing policy". Cuban did not complain, and ended up playing the anthem.

On November 28, 2023, The Dallas Morning News reported that Cuban was in the process of selling his share in the Dallas Mavericks to Miriam Adelson. On December 27, 2023, the NBA approved the sale of a controlling interest of 73% in the Dallas Mavericks to Adelson and Sivan and Patrick Dumont. Cuban stated he earned an estimated $4.3 billion from the sale. In March 2026, Cuban said in appearance on Intersections podcast that he was unhappy with the deal, saying "I don't regret selling. I regret who I sold to. I made a lot of mistakes in the process, and I'll leave it at that."

In July 2026, Cuban filed a petition in Dallas County alleging Dumont engaged in "adversarial business practices," including not allowing Cuban to participate in plans for the Mavericks' new arena. Cuban is seeking the court to compel the team's leadership to disclose details of the new arena.

=== Major League Baseball ===
Cuban has repeatedly expressed interest in owning a Major League Baseball franchise and has unsuccessfully attempted to purchase at least three franchises. In 2008, he submitted an initial bid of $1.3 billion to buy the Chicago Cubs and was invited to participate in a second round of bidding along with several other potential ownership groups. Cuban was not selected to participate in the final bidding process in January 2009. In August 2010, Cuban actively bid to buy the Texas Rangers with Jeffrey L. Beck. Cuban stopped bids after 1 a.m., having placed bids totaling almost $600 million. He had outbid a competing ownership group led by ex-pitcher and Rangers executive Nolan Ryan, but lost the deal before the Rangers played the San Francisco Giants in the 2010 World Series.

In January 2012, Cuban placed an initial bid for the Los Angeles Dodgers, but was eliminated before the second round of bidding. Cuban felt that the value of the Dodgers' TV rights deal drove the price of the franchise too high. He had previously said that he would not be interested in buying the franchise at $1 billion, telling the Los Angeles Times in November 2011 "I don't think the Dodgers franchise is worth twice what the Rangers are worth." However, as the bidding process drew near many speculated that the sale would surpass $1.5 billion, with Jon Heyman of CBS Sports reporting on Twitter that at least one bid in the $1–1.5 billion range was placed in the initial round of the bidding process. Ultimately, the Dodgers sold for $2.15 billion to Guggenheim Baseball Management.

Cuban also previously expressed interest in becoming a minority owner of the New York Mets after owner Fred Wilpon announced in 2011 that he was planning to sell up to a 25% stake in the team.

Cuban has wanted to purchase his hometown Pittsburgh Pirates, but was rebuffed by then owner Kevin McClatchy in 2005.

=== Other sports businesses ===
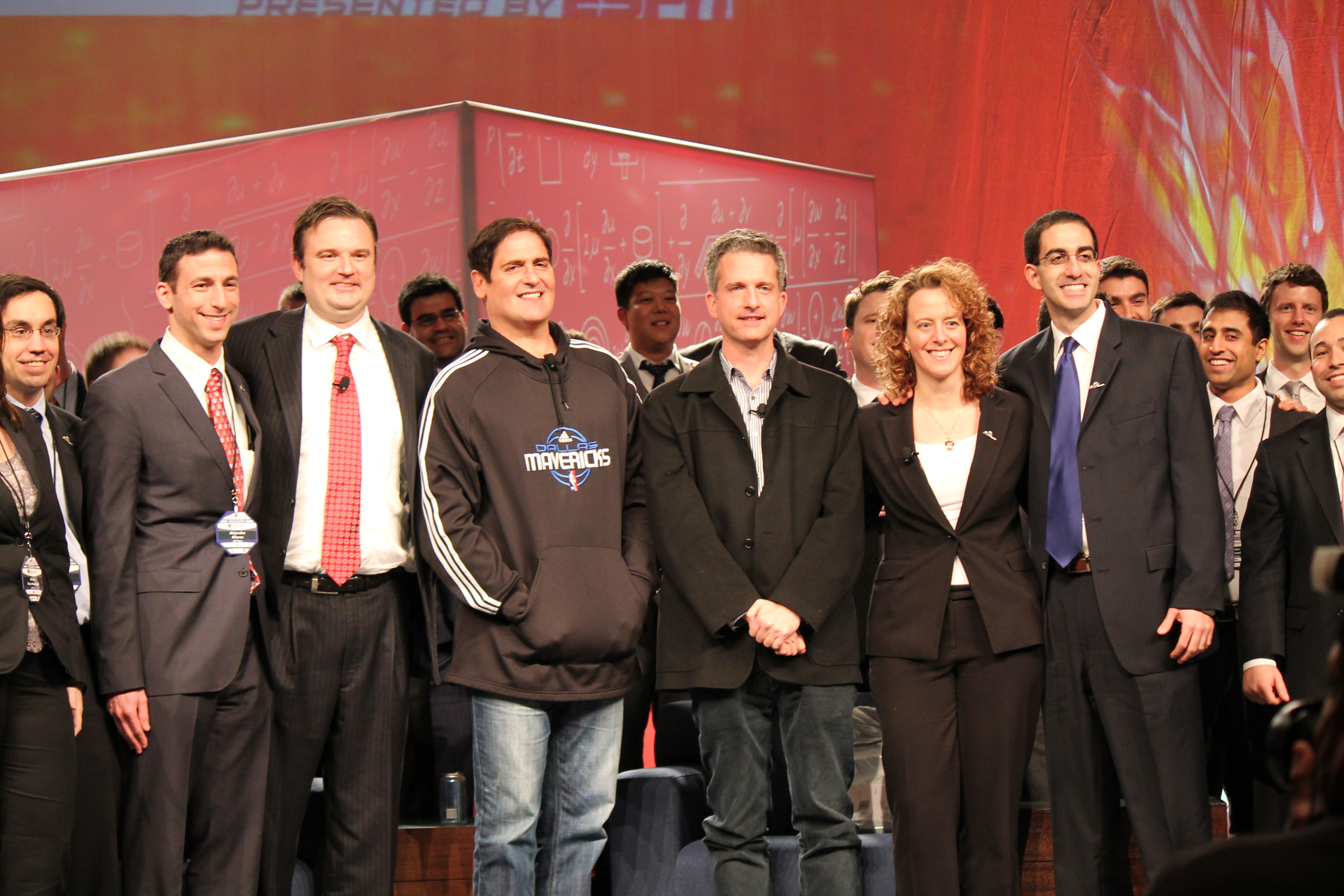
Cuban at the 2012 Sloan Sports Analytics Conference

In 2005, Cuban expressed interest in buying the NHL's Pittsburgh Penguins. In 2006, Cuban joined an investment group along with Dan Marino, Kevin Millevoi, Andy Murstein, and Walnut Capital principals Gregg Perelman and Todd Reidbord to attempt to acquire the Penguins. The franchise ultimately rejected the group's bid when team owners Mario Lemieux and Ronald Burkle took the team off the market.

At WWE's Survivor Series in 2003, Cuban was involved in a kayfabe altercation with Raw General Manager Eric Bischoff and Raw wrestler Randy Orton. On December 7, 2009, Cuban acted as the guest host of Raw, getting revenge on Orton when he was the guest referee in Orton's match against Kofi Kingston, giving Kingston a fast count victory. He then announced that Orton would face Kingston at TLC: Tables, Ladders & Chairs. At the end of the show, Cuban was slammed through a table by the number one contender for the WWE Championship, Sheamus.

On September 12, 2007, Cuban said that he was in talks with WWE Chairman Vince McMahon to create a mixed martial arts company that would compete with UFC. He is now a bondholder of Zuffa, which was formerly UFC's parent company.

Cuban followed up his intentions by organizing "HDNet Fights", a mixed martial arts promotion which airs exclusively on HDNet and premiered on October 13, 2007, with a card headlined by a fight between Erik Paulson and Jeff Ford as well as fights featuring veterans Drew Fickett and Justin Eilers.

Since 2009, Cuban has been a panelist at the annual MIT Sloan Sports Analytics Conference.

In April 2010, Cuban loaned the newly formed United Football League (UFL) $5 million. He did not own a franchise, and he was not involved in day-to-day operations of the league nor of any of its teams. In January 2011, he filed a federal lawsuit against the UFL for their failure to repay the loan by the October 6, 2010, deadline.

In June 2015, Cuban invested in the esports betting platform Unikrn.

In February 2016, Cuban purchased a principal ownership stake in the Professional Futsal League.

On May 7, 2026, Cuban joined the ownership group of the Brampton Honey Badgers of the Canadian Elite Basketball League.

== Political activities ==
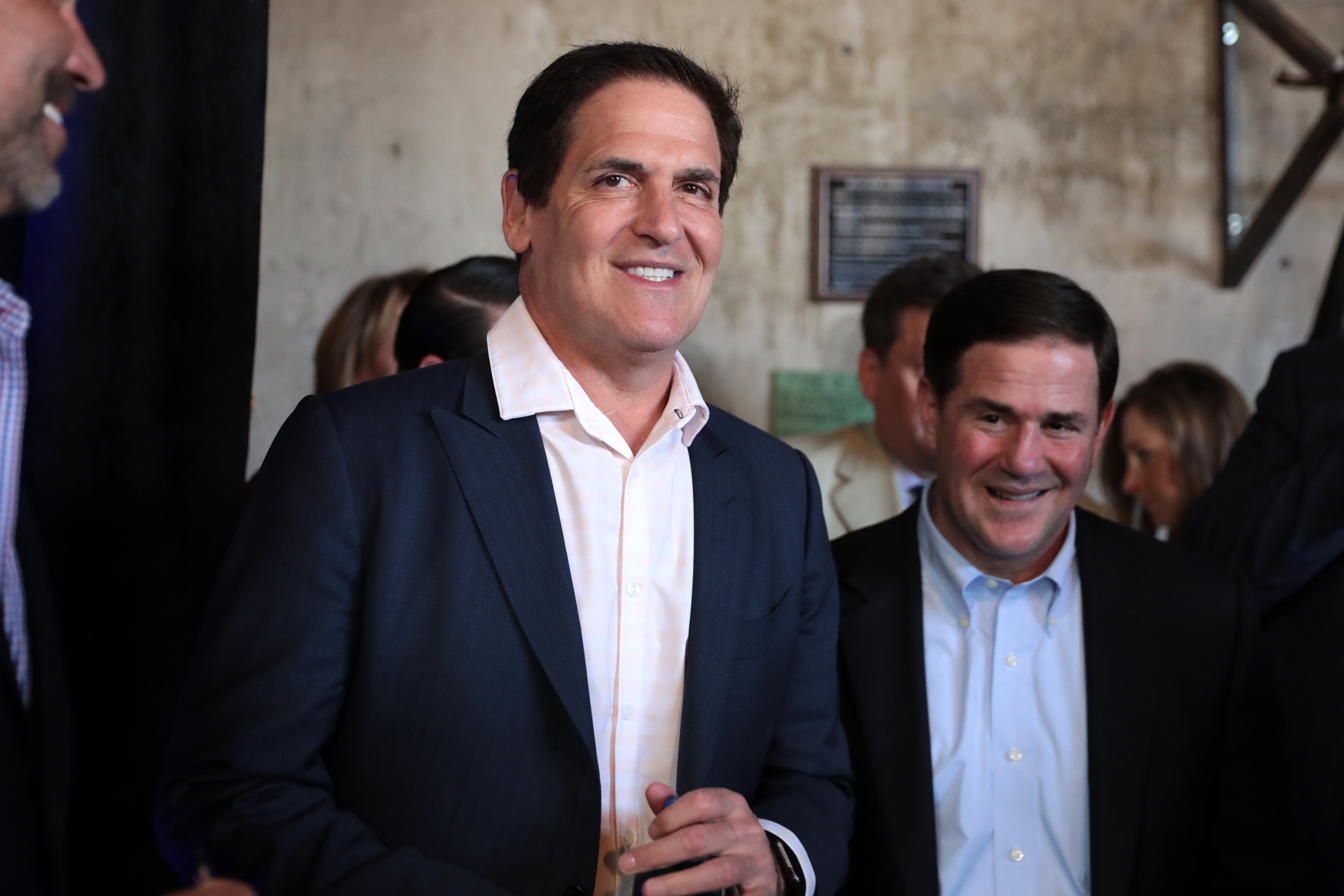
Cuban with Arizona Governor Doug Ducey at the Arizona Technology Innovation Summit in 2019

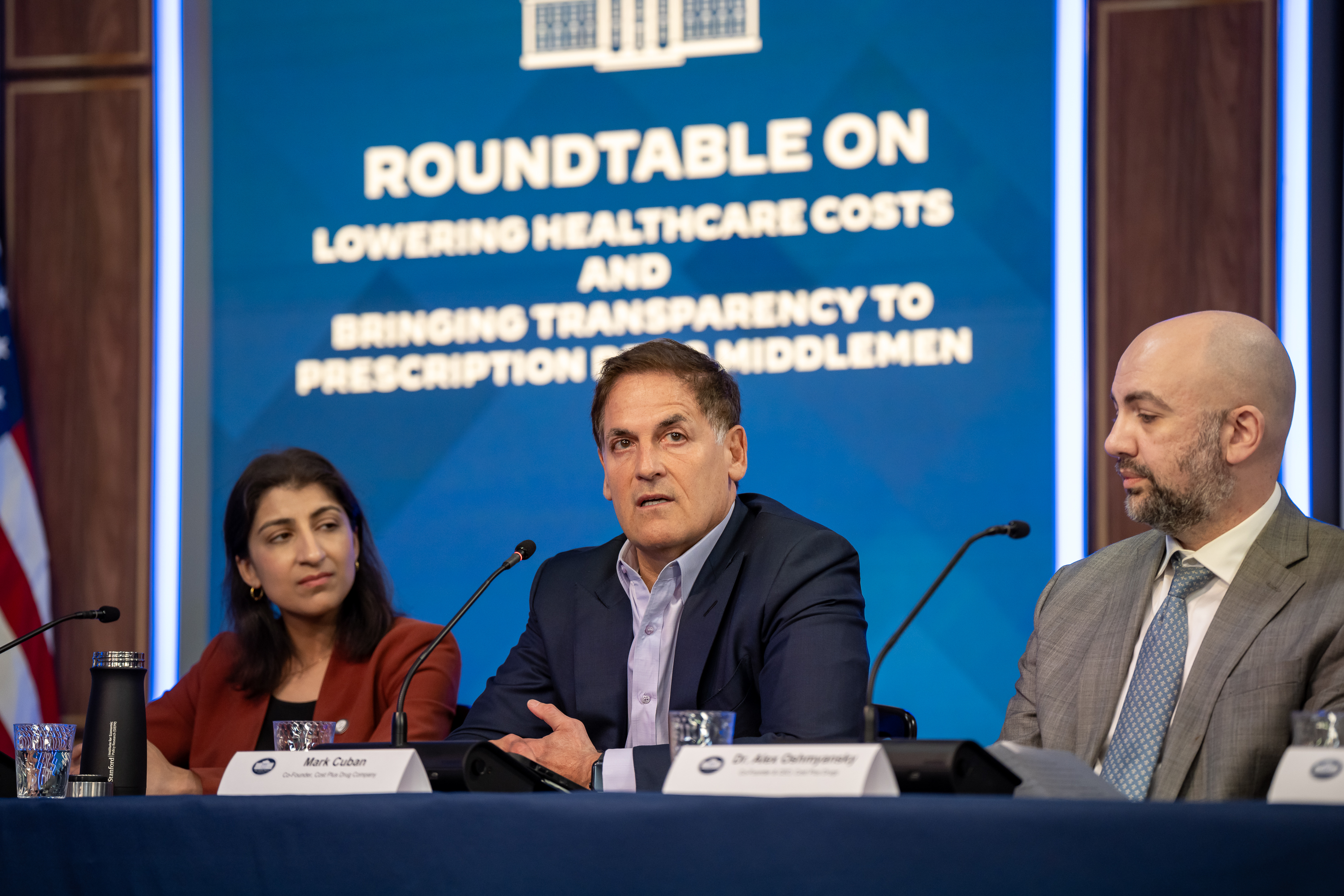
Cuban speaking at the White House in 2024

Cuban is an admirer of author Ayn Rand. About Rand's novel The Fountainhead, he said that it "was incredibly motivating to me. It encouraged me to think as an individual, take risks to reach my goals, and responsibility for my successes and failures. I loved it." His political views have leaned toward libertarianism. He held a position on the centrist Unity08 political organization's advisory council. Despite leaning towards libertarianism, Cuban posted an entry on his blog claiming paying more taxes to be the most patriotic thing someone can do.

In 1996, Cuban donated $6,000 to Republican Senator Orrin Hatch of Utah. In 2002, Cuban donated $1,000 to Democratic California Congresswoman Zoe Lofgren.

On February 8, 2008, Cuban voiced his support for the draft Bloomberg movement attempting to convince New York City Mayor Michael Bloomberg to run in the U.S. presidential election of 2008 on his blog. Cuban concluded a post lamenting the current state of U.S. politics: "Are you listening, Mayor Bloomberg? For less than the cost of opening a tent pole movie, you can change the status quo." He eventually voted for Barack Obama in the 2008 election.

In November 2012, in response to Donald Trump offering President Obama $5 million to a charity of Obama's choosing if he released passport applications and college transcripts to the public, Cuban offered Trump $1 million to a charity of Trump's choosing if Trump shaved his head.

On December 19, 2012, Cuban donated $250,000 to the Electronic Frontier Foundation to support its work on patent reform. Part of his donation funded a new title for EFF's staff attorney Julie Samuels: The Mark Cuban Chair to Eliminate Stupid Patents.

At the Code/Media conference in February 2015, Cuban said of net neutrality that "having [the FCC] overseeing the Internet scares the shit out of me".

Cuban formally endorsed Hillary Clinton for president at a July 30, 2016, rally in Pittsburgh, Pennsylvania. During that campaign stop, Cuban said of Trump, the Republican nominee, "You know what we call a person like that in Pittsburgh? A jagoff ... Is there any bigger jagoff in the world than Donald Trump?"

On November 22, 2016, Cuban met with the then-President-elect Trump's key advisor Steve Bannon. In October 2024, Cuban said on the All-In Podcast that Trump had reached out to him for a position during his administration.

During an appearance on an episode of Hannity in May 2020, Cuban voiced his support for former Vice President Joe Biden in the 2020 United States presidential election.

On February 2, 2021, Cuban joined Reddit's WallStreetBets "Ask Me Anything" forum with millions of members and fielded user questions related to the GameStop short squeeze. In the AMA session, Cuban publicly called the trust of the U.S. Securities & Exchange Commission into question as well as the capabilities of zero commission brokerage firms, like Robinhood, that restricted retail traders from purchasing GameStop shares and other shorted stocks which he said crippled demand. Cuban's advice to Reddit users was to hold GameStop shares if they could afford it in anticipation of additional short sales by Wall Street firms, but ultimately acknowledged that the odds were stacked against them and to use it as a learning experience. He offered insight into his trading technique suggesting that traders know why they are buying something and to "HODL" (hold on for dear life) until they learn that something has changed. Cuban noted a need for policy change to better support retail traders, credited the WallStreetBets community for leading the charge, and expressed optimism about blockchain trading as a more efficient, transparent and trustworthy form of trading for retail traders in the future.

Prior to the 2024 presidential election, Cuban endorsed Kamala Harris for president, describing her as the only candidate in "founder mode"—a term used to describe hands-on business leaders. Alongside LinkedIn co-founder Reid Hoffman, Cuban launched "Business Leaders for Harris", a group of executives supporting Harris for president. The group included Netflix co-founder Reed Hastings, former Merck CEO Kenneth Frazier, former American Express CEO Kenneth Chenault and Box CEO Aaron Levie. Cuban also expressed interest in serving as the head of the U.S. Securities and Exchange Commission (SEC) if Harris were elected and offered himself for the position. He declined to be vetted as Harris's running mate, and also said that he would campaign against her if he thought she would tax wealthy people's "unrealized gains," which is part of the tax plan she has endorsed.

In October 2024, Cuban joined Harris on the campaign trail for the 2024 election, first making an appearance alongside her in Wisconsin on October 17. At his first appearance he mainly spoke about Trump's tariff policies, warning that they will drive up prices and "ruin Christmas". Adding onto this, he compared the then former president to the Grinch, stating "Donald Trump is the Grinch that wants to steal your Christmas. The Grinch doesn't understand how tariffs work... The Grinch is the one that's going to be putting these small business out of business."

=== Fallen Patriot Fund ===
Cuban started the Fallen Patriot Fund to help families of U.S. military personnel killed or injured during the Iraq War, personally matching the first $1 million in contributions with funds from the Mark Cuban Foundation, which is run by his brother Brian Cuban.

=== Speculation of a presidential run ===
In September 2015, Cuban stated in an interview that running for president was "a fun idea to toss around", and that, if he was running in the 2016 United States presidential election, he "could beat both Trump and Clinton". This was interpreted by many media outlets as indication that Cuban was considering running, but he clarified soon afterward that he had no intention to do so.

In October 2015, Cuban posted on Twitter, "Maybe I'll run for Speaker of the House." At the time, there was no clear front-runner to replace the outgoing John Boehner (the Speaker of the House does not have to be a member of Congress).

Cuban told Meet the Press in May 2016 that he would be open to being Clinton's running mate in the election, though he would seek to alter some of her positions in order to do so. In the same interview, the self-described "fiercely independent" Cuban also said that he would consider running as Republican nominee Trump's running mate after having a meeting with Trump about Trump's positions on the issues and suggesting solutions. Cuban also described Trump as "that friend that you just shake your head at. He's that guy who'd get drunk and fall over all the time, or just says dumb shit all the time, but he's your friend." On July 21, 2016, Cuban appeared on a live segment on The Late Show with Stephen Colbert entitled "Gloves Off: Mark Cuban Edition" in which he mocked Trump, including referencing the Trump companies' multiple bankruptcies, the failed Trump University program, and questioning the size of Trump's actual net worth.

In a September 2016 interview with NPR, Cuban effectively positioned himself to support Clinton. He posited that the best strategy to beat Trump was to attack his insecurities, especially that of his intellect. He also added that Trump is the least qualified to be president and is not informed about policies.

In September 2016, during a post-presidential debate interview, Cuban criticized Trump's characterization that paying the minimum required taxes 'is smart' and criticized Trump for not paying back into the system that allowed him to amass such wealth.

In October 2017, Cuban said that he would "definitely" run for president if he was single. Later that month, Cuban said that if he ran for president in 2020, it would be as a Republican, and described himself as "socially a centrist ... but very fiscally conservative". It had also been speculated that he could have challenged Trump in 2020 as a Democrat. However, in a March 2019 interview with the New York Daily News, Cuban stated that he was "strongly considering running" for president as an independent candidate. In May 2019, Cuban said: "It would take the perfect storm for me to do it. There's some things that could open the door, but I'm not projecting or predicting it right now."

In a June 2020 interview with CNN and former Obama advisor David Axelrod, Cuban revealed that he had seriously considered running for president that year as an independent candidate. He went so far as to commission a national poll, which, according to Cuban, showed he would only receive 25 percent of the vote in a hypothetical matchup with Trump and former vice president Joe Biden. Cuban also said that the poll showed his candidacy would have pulled votes from both Trump and Biden.

== Legal problems ==
=== NBA fines ===
Cuban's ownership has been the source of extensive media attention and controversy involving league policies. Cuban has been fined by the NBA at least $1.665 million across 13 incidents, primarily for critical statements about the league and its referees.

In a June 30, 2006, interview, Mavericks player Dirk Nowitzki said about Cuban:

He's got to learn how to control himself as well as the players do. We can't lose our temper all the time on the court or off the court, and I think he's got to learn that, too. He's got to improve in that area and not yell at the officials the whole game. I don't think that helps us ... He sits right there by our bench. I think it's a bit much. But we all told him this before. It's nothing new. The game starts, and he's already yelling at them. So he needs to know how to control himself a little.

In an interview with the Associated Press, Cuban said that he matches NBA fines with charitable donations of equal amounts. In a nationally publicized incident in 2002, he criticized the league's manager of officials, Ed T. Rush, saying that he "wouldn't be able to manage a Dairy Queen." Dairy Queen management took offense to Cuban's comments and invited him to manage a Dairy Queen restaurant for a day. Cuban accepted the company's invitation and worked for a day at a Dairy Queen in Coppell, Texas, where fans lined up in the street to get a Blizzard from the owner of the Mavericks.

During the 2005–06 NBA season, Cuban started a booing campaign when former Mavericks player Michael Finley returned to play against the Mavericks as a member of the San Antonio Spurs. In a playoff series between the Mavericks and Spurs, Cuban cursed Spurs forward Bruce Bowen and was fined $25,000 by the NBA for rushing onto the court and criticizing NBA officials. After the 2006 NBA Finals, Cuban was fined $250,000 by the NBA for repeated misconduct following the Mavericks' loss to the Miami Heat in Game Five of the 2006 NBA Finals.

In February 2007, Cuban publicly criticized NBA Finals MVP Dwyane Wade and declared that he would get fined if he made any comments about what he thought really happened in the 2006 NBA Finals.

On January 16, 2009, the league fined Cuban $25,000 for yelling at Denver Nuggets player J. R. Smith at the end of the first half on a Mavericks-at-Nuggets game played on January 13. Cuban was apparently offended that Smith had thrown an elbow that barely missed Mavericks forward Antoine Wright. Cuban offered to match the fine with a donation to a charity of Smith's choosing. Cuban stated that if he doesn't hear from Smith, then he will donate the money to the NHL Players' Association Goals and Dreams Fund in the names of Todd Bertuzzi and Steve Moore. In May 2009, Cuban made a reference to the Denver Nuggets being "thugs" after a loss to the Nuggets in game 3 of the Western Conference Semifinals. The statement was geared towards the Nuggets and their fans. As he passed Kenyon Martin's mother, who was seated near Cuban as he left the arena, he pointed at her and said, "that includes your son." This controversial comment revisited media attention on Cuban yet again. Cuban issued an apology the next day referencing the poor treatment of away fans in arenas around the league. The league issued a statement stating that they would not fine him.

On May 22, 2010, Cuban was fined $100,000 for comments he made during a television interview about trying to sign LeBron James.

Despite his history, he was notably silent during the Mavericks' 2011 championship playoff run.

Despite Cuban's history with David Stern, he believed the NBA Commissioner would leave a lasting legacy "of a focus on growth and recognizing that the NBA is in the entertainment business and that it's a global product, not just a local product. Whatever platforms that took us to, he was ready to go. He wasn't protective at all. He was wide open. I think that was great."

On January 18, 2014, Cuban was once again fined $100,000 for confronting referees and using inappropriate language toward them. As with previous fines, Cuban confirmed that he would match the fine with a donation to charity, however, with the condition that he reaches two million followers on his Twitter account. Cuban also jokingly commented that he could not let Stern leave without a proper farewell.

On February 21, 2018, Cuban was fined $600,000 by the NBA for stating that the Dallas Mavericks should "tank for the rest of the season." Commissioner Adam Silver stated that the fine was "for public statements detrimental to the NBA."

On March 6, 2020, Cuban was fined $500,000 by the NBA for "public criticism and detrimental conduct regarding NBA officiating", according to the league.

=== SEC insider trading allegation ===
On November 17, 2008, it was reported that the U.S. Securities and Exchange Commission (SEC) filed a civil suit against Cuban relating to alleged insider trading in the shares of Mamma.com, now known as Copernic. A stock dilution occurred shortly after a trade in June 2004, giving hints of inside knowledge at the time of the trade, and Cuban allegedly was saved from a loss of $750,000. The SEC stated that Cuban ordered the sale of his holdings in Mamma.com after he had been confidentially approached by the company to participate in a transaction likely to dilute shares of current shareholders. Cuban disputed the charges, saying he had not agreed to keep the information secret. On his blog, Cuban contended the allegations were false and that the investigation was "a product of gross abuse of prosecutorial discretion". DealBook, a section of The New York Times, reported through an anonymous source that Cuban believed the investigation was motivated by an SEC employee having taken offense to his interest in possibly distributing the film Loose Change.

In July 2009, the U.S. District Court dismissed the charges against Cuban, and the SEC appealed. In September 2010, an appeals court said that the district court had erred and that further proceedings would be necessary to address the merits of the suit.

A federal jury in Texas found in favor of Cuban on October 16, 2013. The nine-member jury issued the verdict after deliberating 3 hours and 35 minutes.

In March 2014, Cuban was on air at CNBC criticizing high-frequency trading (HFT). Those against HFT, such as Cuban, believe the technology is equivalent to automated insider trading.

=== Sexual harassment allegation ===
In a March 6, 2018, article, Willamette Week reported on an alleged April 2011 incident between Cuban and a female patron of a Portland, Oregon bar called the Barrel Room. The woman told Portland police that Cuban sexually groped her while she posed for pictures with him. She submitted seven photographs, two of which Portland Police Detective Brendan McGuire referred to as "significant". Cuban denied the allegations, and his attorney provided the results of a polygraph test taken by Cuban and written statements from two medical doctors stating that the actions described were anatomically improbable. The Portland District Attorney's office declined to prosecute, citing a lack of concrete evidence to support the claim and the woman's preference not to proceed with charges, and concluding that "no crime can be proven beyond a reasonable doubt". The NBA announced on March 8, 2018, that it was reviewing the matter.

== Personal life ==
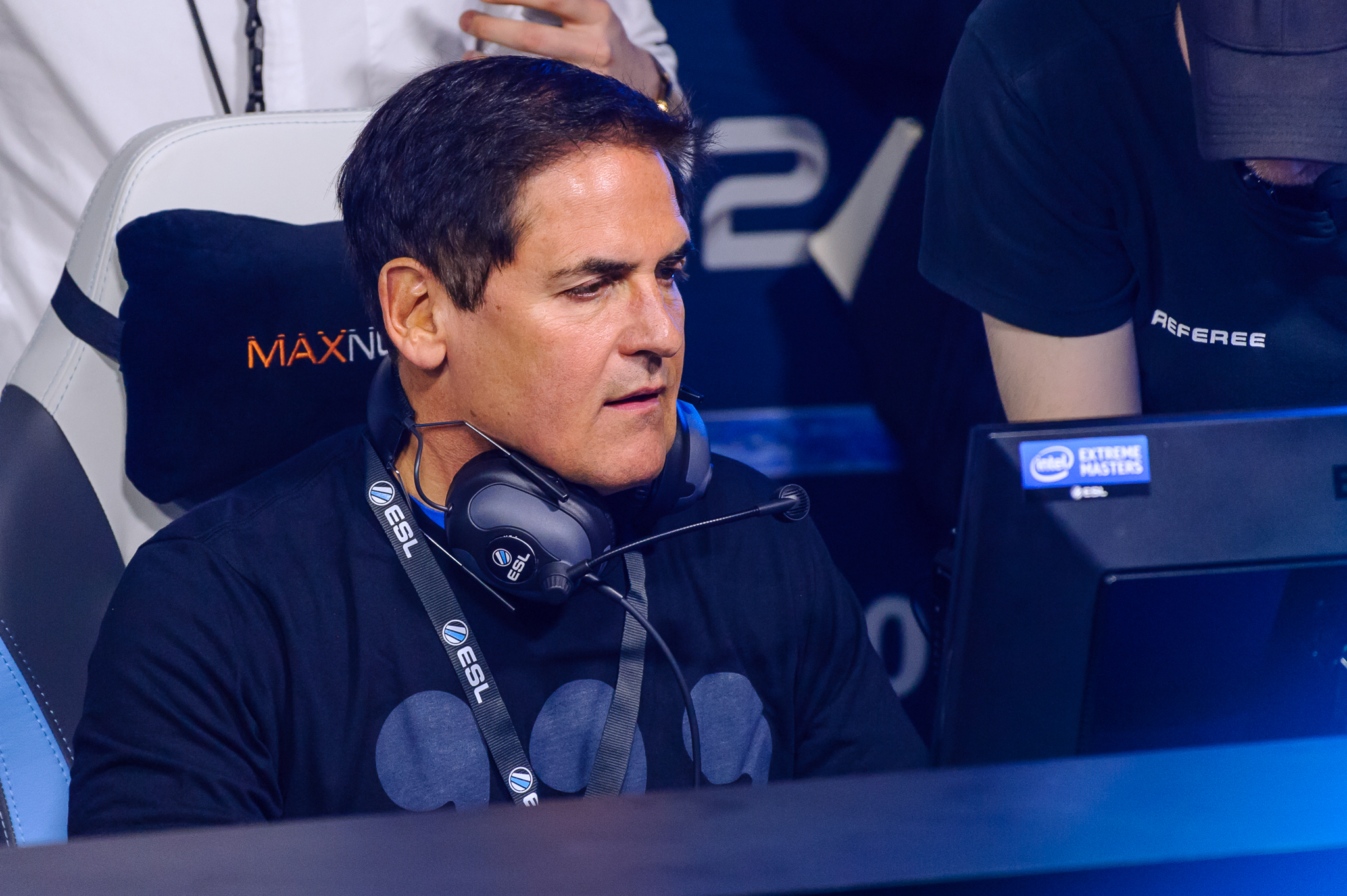
Cuban at an esports event in 2015

Cuban has two brothers, Brian and Jeff.

In September 2002, Cuban married Tiffany Stewart in a private ceremony in Barbados. They have two daughters, born in 2003 and 2006, and a son born in 2009. They live in a 24,000-square-foot (2,200 m^{2}) mansion in the Preston Hollow area of Dallas, Texas.

Cuban has invested in a plant-based meat alternative and is a pescatarian. He is a fan of the Pittsburgh Steelers.

=== Philanthropy ===
In 2003, Cuban founded the Fallen Patriot Fund to help families of U.S. military personnel killed or injured during the Iraq War.

In June 2015, Cuban made a $5 million donation to Indiana University Bloomington for the "Mark Cuban Center for Sports Media and Technology", which was built inside Assembly Hall, the school's basketball arena.

In 2020, Cuban picked up homeless former NBA player Delonte West from a gas station in Dallas. He paid for a hotel room for West along with his treatment at a drug rehabilitation center.

In 2025, Cuban made a large donation of an as yet undisclosed amount to Indiana University, specifically to athletics. In 2024, he donated $6 million to the school's rugby team.

== Awards and honors ==
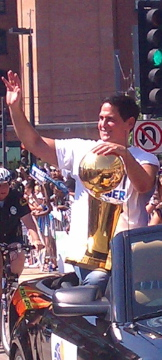
Cuban with the Larry O'Brien Championship Trophy during the 2011 Dallas Mavericks championship parade

The Guinness Book of Records credits Cuban with the "largest single e-commerce transaction" after purchasing a Gulfstream V jet for $40 million over the internet in October 1999.

In 2024, Cuban was included in the Time 100 Most Influential People 2024.

=== Business ===
- 1998 Kelley School of Business Alumni Award – Distinguished Entrepreneur: 1998
- 2011 D Magazine CEO of the Year
- 2020/2021 Texas Business Hall of Fame

=== Media ===
- 2011 Outstanding Team ESPY Award as owner of the Dallas Mavericks

=== NBA ===
- 2011 NBA Champion as owner of the Dallas Mavericks

== Filmography ==
=== Film ===
Film appearances and roles
Year	Title	Role	Notes
1994	Talking About Sex	Macho Mark	
1995	Lost at Sea	Villain	
2004	The Cookout	Himself	
2006	All In	Himself	
2006	Like Mike 2: Streetball	Drop squad coach	
2008	One, Two, Many	Seamus	
2015	Sharknado 3: Oh Hell No!	President of the United States	
2015	Entourage	Himself	
2017	The Clapper	Himself	
2018	Game Over, Man!	Himself	
2019	What Men Want	Himself	
2022	Hustle	Himself	
2023	House Party	Himself	
2023	Good Burger 2	Himself	
2025	Play Dirty	Himself	

=== Television ===
Television appearances and roles
Year	Title	Role	Notes
2000	Walker, Texas Ranger	Himself	
2003	WWE Survivor Series	Crowd member	RKO'd by WWE Superstar Randy Orton.
2004	The Benefactor	Himself	Hosted reality show for six episodes.
2005	Colbert Report	Himself	Episode: 1.32
2007	The Loop	Himself	Episode: "Fatty"
2007	Dancing with the Stars	Himself	He and Kym Johnson became the fifth couple eliminated.
2008–2015	Real Time with Bill Maher	Himself	Episodes: 115, 220, 255, 364
2008	The Simpsons	Himself (voice)	Episode: "The Burns and the Bees"
2009	WWE Raw	Himself	Guest host for the December 7th edition.
2010	NBA All-Star Weekend Celebrity Game	Himself	Played for west team.
2010–2011	Entourage	Himself	Episodes: "Sniff Sniff Gang Bang", "One Last Shot"
2011–2025	Shark Tank	Himself	Main Shark; Seasons 3–16
2012	Skechers Super Bowl XLVI Commercial	Mr. Quiggly's manager	
2012	Trust Us With Your Life	Himself	Episode: 1.03
2012	The Men Who Built America	Himself	
2012	Kick Buttowski: Suburban Daredevil	Mr. Gibble (voice)	Episode: "Goodbye Gully"
2013	Dallas	Himself	Episode: "J.R.'s Masterpiece"
2013	The Neighbors	Himself	Episode: "We Jumped The Shark (Tank)"
2013	Fast N' Loud	Himself	Episode: "Cool Customline"
2013	Necessary Roughness	Himself	Episode: "There's The Door"
2014	American Dad!	Himself (voice)	Episode: "Introducing The Naughty Stewardesses"
2014	Bad Teacher	Himself	Episode: "Fieldtrippers"
2014	The League	Himself	Episode: "The Height Supremacist"
2014	Cristela	Himself	Episode: "Super Fan"
2016	Girl Meets World	Himself	Episode: "Girl Meets Money"
2017	Fast N' Loud	Himself	Episode: "100 Monkeys"
2017	Billions	Himself	Episode: "The Oath"
2018	Billions	Himself	Episode: "The Wrong Maria Gonzlez"
2018	Bar Rescue	Himself	Episode: "Operation: Puerto Rico"
2018	The Who Was? Show	Himself	Episode: "Galileo & Queen Elizabeth"
2019	Billions	Himself	Episode: "Extreme Sandbox"
2019	The Rookie	Himself	Episode: "Impact"
2019	Grace and Frankie	Himself	Episode: "The Tank"
2020	Brooklyn Nine-Nine	Himself	Episode: "The Takeback"
2020	Brain Games	Himself	Episode: "Power and Money"
2020	Trailer Park Boys: The Animated Series	Himself	
2022	Beat Bobby Flay	Himself; guest host	Episode: "A Deal to Beat Bobby"
2022	Home Economics	Himself	Episode: "Poker Game, $800 Buy-In"
2023	Billions	Himself	Episode: "Tower of London"

== Bibliography ==
- How to Win at the Sport of Business: If I Can Do It, You Can Do It. Diversion Publishing. 2011. ISBN 978-1626810914
- Let's Go, Mavs!. Mascot Books. 2007. ISBN 978-1932888720

== See also ==
- List of celebrities by net worth

Sporting positions
Preceded by Ross Perot Jr.	Dallas Mavericks owner 2000–2023	Succeeded by Patrick Dumont; Miriam Adelson
