= Doc Hines =

Doc Hines may refer to:

- Andy Hines (born 1962), American futurist
- Donald E. Hines (1933–2019), American family physician and politician who served on the Louisiana Senate
- Jacob Hines (1927–2020), American veterinarian and politician who served on the Wisconsin State Assembly
