= Sharesleuth =

American investigative reporting website

- Available in: English
- Website: sharesleuth.com
- Launched: 2006
- Current status: Inactive

Sharesleuth was an investigative reporting website, created to investigate and report on instances of alleged securities fraud and corporate malfeasance. It was founded in July 2006 by American businessman Mark Cuban and business reporter Chris Carey, formerly of the St. Louis Post-Dispatch.

== History ==
In early 2006, Carey approached Cuban with the idea of launching an investigative organization focusing on corporate fraud. Cuban was receptive to the idea, and offered to finance the venture. Within its first year, Sharesleuth articles on the publicly traded companies Xethanol and UTEK were followed by drops of over 35% in the stock price of each company. Sharesleuth has since reported on many other companies, including Kandi Technologies and Highland Mint, a firm that manufactured the coins used in the Super Bowl pre-game coin toss.

As a means of funding the site, Cuban typically shorts the stocks of the article subjects prior to publication, a practice which has drawn controversy. He has stated that the site has published articles on "literally anything that I have shorted".

== Related sites ==
In October 2008, Cuban and Carey started a companion website, BailoutSleuth, for the purpose of tracking Troubled Asset Relief Program funds and bank activity in the wake of the 2008 financial crisis and resulting bank bailouts. Pulitzer Prize-winning journalists Gary Cohn of The Baltimore Sun and Russell Carollo of the Dayton Daily News were hired in 2009–2010, the latter to handle Freedom of Information Act requests. Unlike the for-profit Sharesleuth, BailoutSleuth was conceived as a nonprofit service. The site is no longer online.

In mid-2010 Cuban and Carey created another nonprofit website, JunketSleuth.com, to provide access to government travel spending records. As with Sharesleuth, Cuban provided the funding and Carey served as the investigative reporter. The site has since closed.
