= Andy Hines =

Andy Hines may refer to:

- Andy Hines (futurist) (born 1962), American futurist
- Andy Hines (director), Canadian filmmaker

== See also ==
- Andrew Hines (born 1983), American motorcyclist
