= Xethanol =

American corn ethanol producer

Xethanol AMEX: XNL was one of the smaller producers of corn ethanol in the United States, and one of the few publicly traded companies developing technology for producing cellulose ethanol. Ethanol fuel will have increased production from a current level of about 5 billion US gallons (19,000,000 m^{3}) per year (19 Gl/a, almost exclusively from corn) to over 20 billion US gallons (76,000,000 m^{3}) annually (76 Gl/a, mainly from cellulosic materials). Potentially 60 to 100 billion US gallons (230 to 380 Gl) of ethanol could be produced annually in a sustainable manner from domestic biomass resources. To achieve these goals some believe it will be necessary to develop and commercialize technology for the production of ethanol from cellulose and hemicellulose. Xethanol says it plans to increase production and profitability with new technology it has under development.

Xylose Technologies, Inc. (XTI), a subsidiary of Xethanol, is conducting collaborative research through a Cooperative Research and Development Agreement (CRADA) with the USDA Forest Service, Forest Products Laboratory (FPL) located on the campus of the University of Wisconsin–Madison. The work focuses on genetically engineering proprietary yeast strains for the efficient production of xylitol from xylose. Xylose, an abundant five carbon sugar found predominantly in hemicellulose of angiosperms, can be converted to xylitol through biochemical or chemical reduction. The USDA and other university research labs have hundreds of such CRADAs with many companies exploring the technology.

== History ==
Xethanol was formed as a Delaware corporation in 2000 through a reverse merger with Zen Pottery Equipment. It is based in New York City and has operated two production facilities in Iowa since 2003. It began with the acquisition of Permeate Refining, Inc., and in 2004, Xethanol purchased a second plant which operates as Xethanol Biofuels, LLC. In early 2005 it acquired Superior Separation Technologies, Inc. from UTEK Corporation. It has announced plans to build new ethanol plants in Florida, Georgia and South Carolina through a newly formed subsidiary known as CoastalXethanol LLC.

In August 2006, investors and scientists following Xethanol's progress were disturbed by a series of accusations brought against Xethanol on a website called ShareSleuth.com. Follow-up articles appearing in theStreet.com reiterated the story and claimed that it was difficult for reporters and stock analysts to get information from Xethanol officials. A Soleil Securities alternative energy analyst cut Xethanol's rating to "Sell-target $1.53" from "Hold-target $10" after he became disillusioned by the response from Xethanol. The analyst had been trying to obtain information from Xethanol for institutions interested in investing.

The ShareSleuth article revealed that people connected with the Xethanol's secondary stock offering had been sanctioned by the SEC and that the resume of Xethanol's chief executive officer, Christopher D'Arnaud Taylor had been inflated. In response, D'Arnaud Taylor, as well as several of his associates who dominated the company's board of directors, resigned or took less prominent roles. The ShareSleuth article pointed out that one of the company's smaller facilities was shuttered and rusting. The company noted that it had not been operational when they purchased it, and that it was intended for use in pilot development operations. However, there was no explanation why company officials suggested in interviews that the facility was in use, and later that "it is being renovated as we speak."

This rapid increase in Xethanol's stock price could be attributed largely to President Bush's 2006 State of the Union Address on January 31 in which he announced that the administration was undertaking a major new effort to develop technology for the production of "cellulosic ethanol" from agricultural materials such as switchgrass. This speech was followed the next day by an announcement from the Department of Energy that it would be funding 40% of the capital costs of two large (700 ton per day) cellulosic ethanol demonstration plants.

Even though there are about five companies currently working on production of ethanol from cellulose, Xethanol was virtually the only company public at the time. Within days, its stock price shot up to $6 per share. Even though much of the population had never heard of switch grass, the idea of a renewable source of energy sparked their interest. Xethanol's small capitalization combined with a public anxious about rising petroleum costs and global warming drove Xethanol's run-up in price. The decrease in share price—along with falling share prices of other companies associated with ethanol production—followed as investors began to realize the technological differences between making ethanol from corn starch or sugar cane and making it from cellulose. In a Securities and Exchange Commission filing in September 2006, Xethanol acknowledged that it was not as close to the breakthrough technology as previously represented. The value of the technologies it had purchased were written down as an accounting measure, and Xethanol also warned that it did not have the financing to complete its previously announced plans.

== Renaming and bankruptcy ==
On August 28, 2008, Xethanol relaunched itself as Global Energy Holdings Group, Inc., with the intention to diversify away from ethanol to other alternative fuels including woody biomass, orange peels, and methane from landfills.

By September, 2009, Global Energy Holdings had filed for Chapter 11 bankruptcy.

== See also ==
- Biofuel
- Ethanol
