= ZenBusiness =

American software-as-a-service company

- Type: Public-benefit corporation
- Industry: Fintech
- Founded: 2015; 11 years ago
- Founders: Ross Buhrdorf; Shanaz Hemmati
- Headquarters: Austin, Texas, U.S.
- Key people: Mark Cuban
- Products: ZenBusiness Money; Velo
- Website: www.zenbusiness.com

ZenBusiness is an American software-as-a-service (Saas) company that provides business formation and fintech services. It was founded in 2015 by Ross Buhrdorf and Shanaz Hemmati and is headquartered in Austin, Texas. It operates as a public-benefit corporation.

== History ==
ZenBusiness was founded in 2015 by Ross Buhrdorf and Shanaz Hemmati. Before founding ZenBusiness, Buhrdorf served as the CTO of the vacation rental company HomeAway, which was eventually acquired by Expedia. Hemmati also served as an executive at HomeAway before co-founding ZenBusiness with Buhrdorf. Mark Cuban serves as an advisor, shareholder, and spokesperson for ZenBusiness.

Initially, the company operated according to a product-led growth (PLG) strategy, offering some services for free. In 2018, ZenBusiness began offering the same services and SaaS simultaneously. In 2020, ZenBusiness transitioned to an annual package-based model.

In the same year, ZenBusiness acquired the digital banking platform Joust. The following year, ZenBusiness launched its own money management app, ZenBusiness Money. In 2022, ZenBusiness acquired the growth-engine platform Ureeka.

ZenBusiness launched Velo, an AI agent and chatbot for automating business tasks, such as filing regulations, doing research, creating websites, and providing personalized advice, in 2025.

In March 2026, the ransomware group ShinyHunters claimed responsibility for stealing several terabytes of data from ZenBusiness via vishing. The group issued a warning, demanding a ransom payment by March 25 or the stolen data would be leaked.

On November 19, 2026 ZenBusiness was acquired by ADP.
