= Andy Hines (futurist) =

American futurist and author (born 1962)

- Born: Andrew L. Hines; 22 March 1962 (age 64)
- Occupation: Futurist

Andrew L. Hines (born March 22, 1962) is an American futurist, head of graduate studies in Foresight at the University of Houston, and author of several books on strategic foresight.

Hines is a professional futurist, co-creator of the framework foresight method, Associate Professor and Program Coordinator of the Graduate Program in Foresight at the University of Houston, Principal of foresight consulting firm Hinesight, and former organizational futurist at Kellogg Company and Dow Chemical. He has written on futures studies, strategic foresight, foresight research methods, the role of organizational futurists, and the consumer landscape.

== Professional career ==
Hines joined Joseph Coates of Coates & Jarratt, Inc as a consulting futurist in 1990. He then spent a decade as an organizational futurist with The Kellogg Company as senior manager of global trends and thereafter at The Dow Chemical Company as senior ideation leader. He returned to foresight consulting as a managing director at Social Technologies (Innovaro) and simultaneously joined the faculty of the University of Houston as a lecturer. for the then Future Studies Graduate Program in 2005. In 2010 he established his own foresight consulting firm, Hinesight, which continues to operate. After the retirement of Peter Bishop in 2013, he was appointed as the current Program Coordinator and now Associate Professor for the Graduate Program in Strategic Foresight at the University of Houston, teaching courses in futures studies and serving as advisor to Foresight students. He is also founding chair, executive director, and long-time board member of the Association of Professional Futurists.

Hines’ published contributions including a regular column called “Hinesight” in the journal Foresight, originate from his specialty in integrating foresight into organizations. He also explored the role of shifting personal values in understanding the consumer landscape, which consequently was the topic of his book Consumershift: How Changing Values Are Reshaping the Consumer Landscape published in 2011. Hines has delivered more than 350 keynotes, presentations, and workshops on futures-related topics for clients in business, government, and non-profits. He designs and facilitates workshops using a variety of foresight methods, including the “framework foresight” method with he developed together with Peter Bishop, for the purposes of innovation, strategy development, new business and product development. The “Framework Foresight” method is described in the second edition of Thinking about the Future.

== Education ==
- Ph.D. (foresight), Leeds Metropolitan University, 2012.
- M.S. (future studies), University of Houston-Clear Lake, 1990.

== Selected works ==
=== Books ===
- Hines, A. Imagining After Capitalism. Triarchy Press, 2025. ISBN 978-1917251037
- Slaughter, R. (Ed.) & Hines, A. (Assoc. Ed.) (2020). The Knowledge Base of Futures Studies 2020. Association of Professional Futurists.
- Thinking about the Future: Guidelines for Strategic Foresight, 2nd edition (co-author: Peter C. Bishop), 2015, 2007, ISBN 978-0996773409 (2nd) ISBN 978-0978931704 (1st)
- Teaching about the Future,(co-author: Peter C. Bishop), 2012, ISBN 978-0230363496 - Received the 2014 Association of Professional Futurists Most Significant Futures Work Award for Methods and Practice.
- ConsumerShift: How Changing Values Are Reshaping the Consumer Landscape, 2011, ISBN 978-1614660033
- 2025: Science and Technology Reshapes US and Global Society, (co-author: Joseph F Coates, John Mahaffie), 1997, ISBN 978-1886939097
- Managing Your Future as an Association: Thinking about Trends and Working with Their Consequences, (co-author: Jennifer Jarrett, Joseph F Coates, John Mahaffie), 1994,ISBN 978-0880340847

=== Selected articles ===
- A. Hines, 2025, "A Technique for Guiding Images: Imagining the Future After Capitalism." In Placing the Future, Knowledge and Space (KNAS, volume 20), 35-54, published online May 7, 2025.
- A. Hines, 2025, "The Role of Values and Worldview in Societal Transitions: The Case of After Capitalism." Special Issue: Futures in Transition: Designing Transitions and Future-Making for Systems-Level Change World Futures Review, published online April 24, 2025.
- A. Hines, H. Benoit, L. Leong, D. Worrell, L. Schlehuber, and A. Cowart, 2024. “Mapping Archetype Scenarios across the Three Horizons,” Futures, 162, 103418.
- A. Hines, M. Vincent, and R. Puddy, 2024, “Establishing a strategic foresight learning and action network (SF-LAN) at the Centers for Disease Control and Prevention (CDC). World Futures Review, 16(3), 244–260.
- A. Hines, 2023. “Imagining after capitalism” Journal of Futures Studies, 28(2), 123-137.
- A. Hines, et al. 2021. “Monitoring emerging issues: A proposed approach and initial test.” World Futures Review, 0(0), 1–19.
- A. Hines, 2020. “The evolution of framework foresight.” Foresight, 22 (5/6), 643-651.
- A. Hines, 2019. “Getting ready for a post-work future.” Foresight and STI Governance, 13(1), 19-30.
- A. Hines, D. Bengston, M. Dockry and A. Cowart. 2018. “Setting up a horizon scanning system: A U.S. federal agency example.” World Futures Review, 10(2) 136–151.
- A. Hines, J. Gary, C. Daheim, and L. van der Laan. 2017. “Building foresight capacity: Toward a foresight competency model. World Futures Review, 9(3), 123-141.
- A. Hines, A. & J. Gold, “An organizational futurist role for integrating foresight into corporations,” Technological Forecasting and Social Change, 2015. 101, 99–111.
- A. Hines “Future-friendly design: Designing for and with future consumers,” In M. Luchs, K. S. Swann & A. Griffin (Eds.), Design thinking: New product development essentials from the PDMA (pp. 333–348). Hoboken, NJ: Wiley, (2015).
- A.Hines & Jeff Gold, “Professionalizing foresight: Why do it, where it stands, and what needs to be done,” Journal of Futures Studies, June 2013, 17(4): 35-54
- A. Hines, “Shifting Values: Hope and Concern for ‘Waking Up,’” On the Horizon, 21 (3), 2013.
- A. Hines. “A Dozen Surprises about the Future of Work,” Employment Relations Today, Spring 2011.
- A. Hines, “How Accurate Are Your Forecasts? More Accurate Than You Might Think,” World Future Review, October/November 2009.
- A. Hines, P. Bishop & T. Collins, “The Current State of Scenario Development: An Overview of Techniques,” Foresight, Vol. 9, #1, pp. 5–25. (Received the 2008 Emerald Literati Awards’ Outstanding Paper accolade for best article published in Foresight).
- A. Hines, “The Futures of Futures: A Scenario Salon,” Foresight, Vol. 5, #4, 2003.
- A. Hines, “An Audit for Organizational Futurists: 10 Questions Every Organizational Futurist Should Be Able to Answer,” Foresight, Vol. 5, #1, 2003. (Received the 2003 Emerald Literati Awards’ Outstanding Paper accolade for best article published in Foresight).
- A. Hines. “A Practitioner’s View of the Future of Futures Studies,” Futures, Vol. 34, 2002, pp. 337–347.
- A. Hines, K. Kelly & S. Noesen, “Viral Futures at Dow,” Futures Research Quarterly, Fall 2001.
- A. Hines, “The Postmodern Shift and Jobs in the Future: The Coming Values Changes and the Implications for Human Resources,” Employment Relations Today, Winter 2000.
- A. Hines, “Futurists on the ‘Inside:’ The State of Practice of Organizational Futurists,” Futures Research Quarterly, Winter 1999.
- A. Hines “The Future of Nanotechnology,” Macmillan’s Encyclopedia of the Future, (NY: Macmillan 1996).
- A. Hines, “A Checklist for Evaluating Forecasts,” The Futurist, November–December 1995, pp. 20–24.
- A. Hines, J. Coates & J. Mahaffie, “Technological Forecasting: 1970-1993,” Technological Forecasting & Social Change, Vol. 47, 1994, pp. 23–33.
