= Amplify Publishing Group =

American book publisher and distributor

Mascot Books
- Founded: 2003
- Headquarters location: Herndon, Virginia, United States
- Fiction genres: Nonfiction, Fiction, Children's, Cookbooks
- Owner: Naren Aryal
- No. of employees: 17
- Official website: mascotbooks.com

Mascot Books is a full-service, multi-genre, independent book publisher and distributor. It is a hybrid publishing company headquartered in Herndon, Virginia, USA. The company publishes a variety of genres, including fiction, nonfiction, children's, cookbooks, and coffee table books.

== History ==
Naren Aryal co-founded Mascot Books in 2003 with the publication of Hello, Hokie Bird, a children's book about his alma mater's mascot, the Virginia Tech's HokieBird. After a successful initial title, Aryal left his job as a corporate attorney to start Mascot Books. Since inception, the business has published more than 2,500 titles. In 2017 and 2018, Mascot Books was featured in The Washington Post, USA Today, and The Costco Connection.

== See also ==
- List of publishers
- List of book distributors
- Publishing
