= Innovaro =

Defunct consulting company

- Company type: Consulting company
- Founded: 1997
- Founder: Clifford M. Gross

Innovaro, formerly known as UTEK Corporation, was a consulting company focused on innovation and software solutions. It was based in Tampa, Florida. It was founded by Clifford M. Gross in 1997. The company initial public offering was in October 2000, and raised approximately US$6.0 million. It raised £7.5 million on joining AIM in April 2005 and a further $10 million on NYSE where it was already listed in February 2006. For the year to 31 December 2005, revenues amounted to $22.7 million, up from $7.2 million and pre-tax profits of $9.5 million, up from $1.5 million.

Innovaro traded on the NYSE under the stock symbol INNI. The company sold several divisions in September 2012 and was delisted from the NYSE.

The original concept of the company was to facilitate “open innovation” through the acquisition of university-developed technologies by companies that needed technologies to grow.

Innovaro had offices in Chicago, Amsterdam, London and York, United Kingdom. As of March 2009, at its peak, the company had over 450 clients.

The name “UTEK” originated from a phonetic contraction of University and Technology. The Company began doing business as Innovaro in March 2010. The Innovaro brand came from one of UTEK's acquired companies and the name was adopted to best represent the overall company and its services. Other companies acquired an integrated understanding the Innovaro brand included UK based Pharmalicenisng, Strategos (Gary Hamel's consulting firm) and Social Technologies.

Innovaro Limited (the original company acquired by UTEK) was one of Europe's leading innovation strategy and insight firms. Founded in 2000, it focused on helping major organisations identify new opportunities and improve innovation capabilities. Most public of its projects were the technology futures programme undertaken with Shell in 2004 and 2007 which developed a new approach to collaborative foresight.

== Acquisitions ==
The following is a list of acquisitions by UTEK:

- Pharmalicensing (January 2008)
- Strategos (April 2008)
- Innovaro (July 2008)
- Social Technologies (September 2008)
