= Parliamentary committees of the United Kingdom =

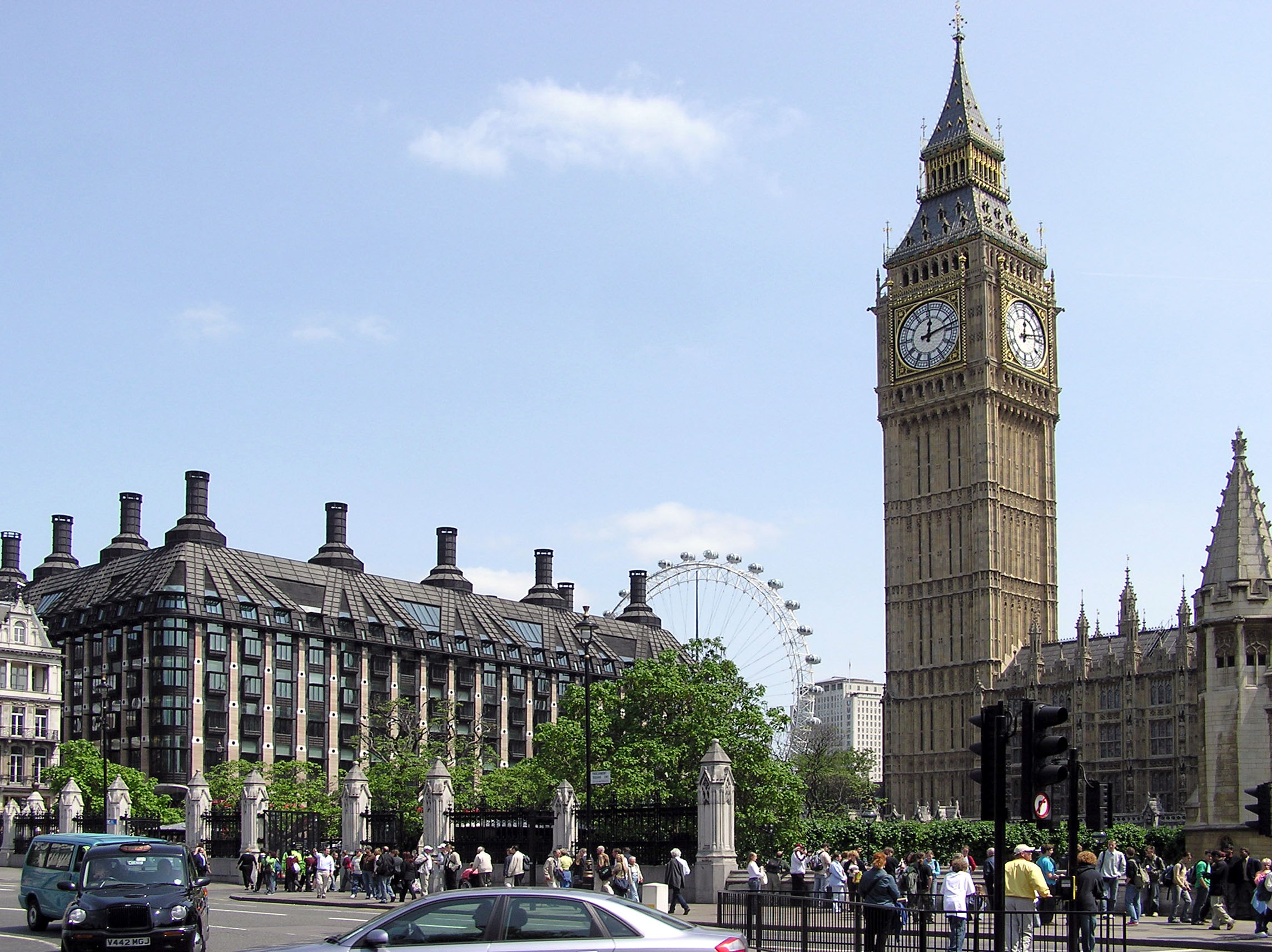
Committee meetings take place in committee rooms at the Palace of Westminster (right) and Portcullis House (left)

Each committee of the Parliament of the United Kingdom consists of a small number of Members of Parliament from the House of Commons, or peers from the House of Lords, or a mix of both, appointed to deal with particular areas or issues; most are made up of members of the Commons. The majority of parliamentary committees are select committees. The remit of these committees vary depending on whether they are committees of the House of Commons or the House of Lords.

== House of Commons ==
Logo of the House of Commons

=== Select committees ===
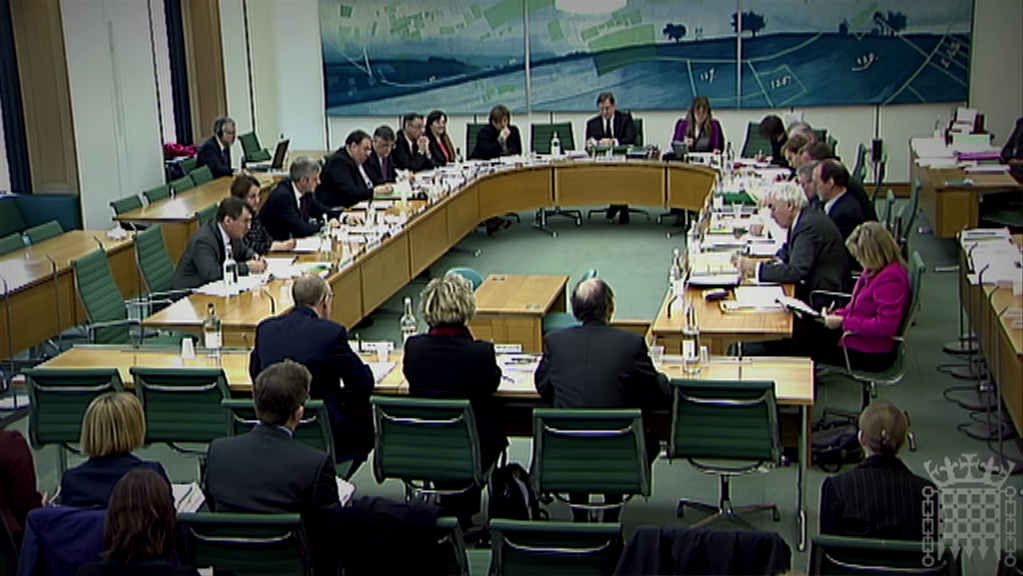
A committee of the House of Commons meets in Portcullis House c. 2010

Select committees in the Commons are designed to oversee the work of departments and agencies, examine topical issues affecting the country or individual regions or nations, and review and advise on the procedures, workings and rules of the House.

- Departmental select committees are designed to oversee and examine the work of individual government departments and any related departmental bodies and agencies.
- Topical select committees examine topical issues of importance.
- Internal select committees have responsibility with respect to the day-to-day running of Parliament.

=== General committees ===
- Public bill committees (formerly known as Standing Committees on Bills)
- Delegated Legislation Committees
- European Committees
- Northern Ireland Grand Committee
- Regional Affairs Committee
- Scottish Grand Committee
- Welsh Grand Committee

=== Other committees ===
- Advisory Committee on Works of Art
- House of Commons Commission
  - Administration Estimate Audit Committee
  - Members Estimate Committee
  - Members Estimate Audit Committee
- Public Accounts Commission
- Speaker's Committee on the Electoral Commission
- Speaker's Committee for the Independent Parliamentary Standards Authority

== House of Lords ==
Logo of the House of Lords

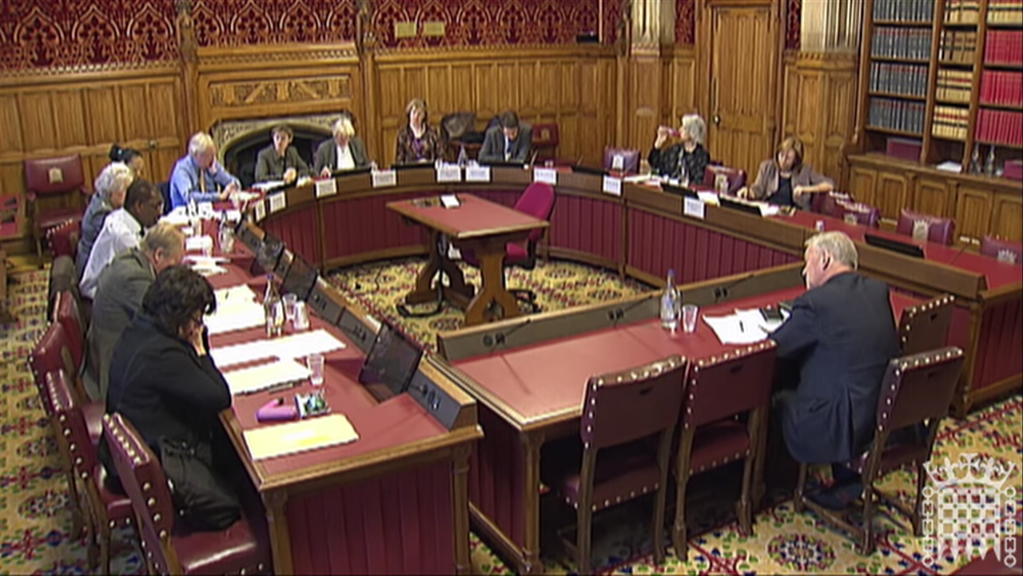
Lords select committee c. 2013

The House of Lords appoint Sessional select committees to examine and explore general issues such as the constitution or the economy; each session Special Inquiry committees are appointed to examine specific issues.

=== Topical ===
- Communications and Digital Committee
- Constitution Committee
- International Agreements Committee
- International Relations and Defence Committee
- Science and Technology Committee
- Economic Affairs Committee
  - Finance Bill Sub-Committee
- European Affairs Committee
  - Windsor Framework Sub-Committee

=== Special Inquiry (2019–2021 session) ===
- Electoral Registration and Administration Act 2013 Select Committee
- Food, Poverty, Health & the Environment Select Committee
- Social and Economic Impact of Gambling Select Committee
- Democracy & Digital Technologies Select Committee

=== Legislative ===
- Delegated Powers and Regulatory Reform Select Committee (DPRRC)
- Secondary Legislation Scrutiny Committee (SLSC)
- Hybrid Instruments Committee

=== Internal ===
- House of Lords Commission
- Finance Committee
- Liaison Committee
- Conduct Committee
- Procedure and Privileges Committee
- Committee of Selection

=== Domestic ===
- Services Committee

== Joint house committees ==
Joint Committees are committees formed to examine a particular issue, whose membership is from both the Commons and the Lords.

- Joint Committee on Consolidation Bills
- Ecclesiastical Committee
- Joint Committee on the National Security Strategy
- Joint Committee on Human Rights
- Intelligence and Security Committee of Parliament
- Joint Committee on Statutory Instruments
- Joint Committee on Tax Law Rewrite Bills
- Joint Committee on the Palace of Westminster

== Former committees ==
Occasionally, committees will be discharged. This occurs when existing committees are no longer required or have their responsibilities transferred to a different committee, effectively rendering the original committee void. It is more common, however, for committees to be discharged as a result of the abolition of government departments, for example the abolition of the Department of Education and Skills in June 2007 resulted in the abolition of the Education and Skills Select Committee shortly afterwards.

=== Commons ===
==== Departmental ====
- Agriculture Select Committee - dissolved in 2001, and replaced by the Environment, Food and Rural Affairs Select Committee following the replacement of the Ministry of Agriculture, Food and Fisheries with the Department for Environment, Food and Rural Affairs
- Business and Enterprise Select Committee - dissolved 30 September 2009, and replaced by the Business, Innovation and Skills Select Committee following the replacement of the Department for Business, Enterprise and Regulatory Reform with the Department for Business, Innovation and Skills
- Constitutional Affairs Select Committee - dissolved 25 July 2007, and replaced by the Justice Select Committee following the replacement of the Department for Constitutional Affairs with the Ministry of Justice.
- Education and Employment Select Committee - split in 2001 into the Education and Skills Select Committee and the Work and Pensions Select Committee following the splitting of the Department for Education and Employment into two distinct departments.
- Education and Skills Select Committee - dissolved 25 July 2007, and replaced with the Children, Schools and Families Select Committee and the Innovation, Universities, Science and Skills Select Committee following the replacement of the Department of Education and Skills with the Department for Children, Schools and Families and the Department for Innovation, Universities and Skills.
- Energy and Climate Change Select Committee - abolished after the Department for Energy and Climate Change was merged into the new Department for Business, Energy and Industrial Strategy in July 2016.
- Environment, Transport and Regional Affairs Select Committee - abolished in 2001, with the environment portion of the committee's remit being transferred to the Environment, Food and Rural Affairs Select Committee and the remainder being transferred to the new Transport, Local Government and the Regions Select Committee following changes to several government departments following the 2001 general election.
- Innovation, Universities, Science and Skills Select Committee - dissolved 30 September 2009 following the abolition of the Department for Innovation, Universities and Skills. Technically replaced by the Science and Technology Select Committee.
- Lord Chancellor's Department Committee – abolished in 2003 following the merging of the Lord Chancellor's Department into the Department for Constitutional Affairs
- Committee on the Office of the Deputy Prime Minister – abolished in 2006 and replaced with the Communities and Local Government Select Committee following the abolition of the Office of the Deputy Prime Minister, which was replaced by the Department for Communities and Local Government
- Political and Constitutional Reform Select Committee – created in 2010 to scrutinise the work of Nick Clegg, the Deputy Prime Minister, who had responsibility for political and constitutional reform in the coalition government. On 3 June 2015 it was merged with the Public Administration Select Committee to form the Public Administration and Constitutional Affairs Select Committee.
- Public Administration Select Committee – merged with the Political and Constitutional Reform Select Committee on 3 June 2015 to form the Public Administration and Constitutional Affairs Select Committee.
- Science and Technology Committee – abolished in 2007 following the creation of the Innovation, Universities, Science and Skills Select Committee
- Social Security Select Committee – abolished in 2001 and replaced with the Work and Pensions Select Committee following the replacement of the Department of Social Security with the Department for Work and Pensions
- Trade and Industry Select Committee - dissolved 25 July 2007, and replaced with the Business and Enterprise Select Committee following the replacement of the Department of Trade and Industry with the Department for Business, Enterprise and Regulatory Reform.
- Transport, Local Government and the Regions Select Committee – abolished after less than one year and replaced by the Office of the Deputy Prime Minister Select Committee and the Transport Select Committee

==== Domestic ====
All five domestic committees were abolished in 2005 and replaced by a single committee – the Administration Committee.

- Accommodation and Works Committee
- Administration Committee
- Broadcasting Committee
- Catering Committee
- Information Committee

==== Internal ====
- Select Committee on the Modernisation of the House of Commons (examined how Commons practices and procedures could be modernised)

==== Legislative ====
- Legislative grand committees (2015-2021)

==== Regional Grand Committees ====
Eight regional grand committees were established by temporary standing orders which were in force between January 2009 and May 2010. Each committee related with one of the eight regions of England outside Greater London, and all MPs from constituencies in each region were able to attend and participate in the proceedings of the relevant regional grand committee. It was envisioned that the committees would meet twice a year, however in reality they only ever met once in Autumn 2009 before being abolished the following year.

==== Regional Select Committees ====
The House of Commons set up eight regional select committees in November 2008, whose members were first appointed on 3 March 2009. The committees were formed of five Labour members, as opposed to the nine members from various parties as was agreed in the original motion, due to the refusal of the Conservatives and Liberal Democrats to nominate any members as a sign of their opposition to setting up the committees. The resolution that formed the committees expired at the end of the 2005/10 Parliament. The succeeding coalition government of Conservatives and Liberal Democrats chose not to renew it.

- East of England Regional Select Committee
- East Midlands Regional Select Committee
- North East Regional Select Committee
- North West Regional Select Committee
- South East Regional Select Committee
- South West Regional Select Committee
- West Midlands Regional Select Committee
- Yorkshire and the Humber Regional Select Committee

=== Lords ===
==== Topical ====
- European Union Committee
  - Environment Sub-Committee
  - Goods Sub-Committee
  - Security & Justice Sub-Committee
  - Services Sub-Committee

==== Internal ====
- House Committee (replaced by House of Lords Commission)
- Privileges and Conduct Committee (split into Conduct Committee and Procedure and Privileges Committee)

==== Domestic ====
- Administration and Works Committee (replaced by Services Committee)
- Information Committee (replaced by Services Committee)
- Refreshment Committee (replaced by Services Committee)
- House of Lords Offices Committee

=== Joint ===
- Joint Committee on House of Lords Reform
- Joint Committee of Tax Simplification
