= Liaison Committee (House of Commons of the United Kingdom) =

Committee of the House of Commons

The Liaison Committee is a committee of the British House of Commons, the lower house of the United Kingdom Parliament. The committee consists of the chairs of the 32 Commons select committees and the chair of the Joint Committee on Human Rights.

The role of the committee is to consider general matters relating to the work of select committees. It advises the House of Commons Commission on select committees as well as choosing select committee reports for debate in the chamber.

Since 2002, the Prime Minister has appeared annually before the Liaison Committee in order to give evidence on matters of public policy. The Liaison Committee is the only Commons committee that questions the prime minister and generally meets three times a year.

In mid 2024 the Liaison Committee's work was paused for three months due to the general election. It was reestablished as part of the new Parliament resuming its role over Commons select committee chairs.

== Chairs ==
Committee chairs include those listed below.

Name	Start	End	Party	Constituency
Edward du Cann	3 May 1979	9 June 1983	Conservative	Taunton
Terence Higgins	9 June 1983	21 March 1997	Conservative	Worthing
Robert Sheldon	14 July 1997	11 May 2001	Labour	Ashton-under-Lyne
Alan Williams	5 November 2001	6 May 2010	Labour	Swansea West
Alan Beith	21 July 2010	30 March 2015	Liberal Democrats	Berwick-upon-Tweed
Andrew Tyrie	14 October 2015	3 May 2017	Conservative	Chichester
Sarah Wollaston	13 November 2017	6 November 2019	Conservative	Totnes
Bernard Jenkin	23 May 2020	30 May 2024	Conservative	Harwich and North Essex
Meg Hillier	10 December 2024	present	Labour Co-op	Hackney South and Shoreditch

== Membership ==
As of 14 September 2026, the members of the committee are as follows:

Member	Party	Constituency	Committee
Dame Meg Hillier (chair)	Labour Co-op	Hackney South & Shoreditch	Treasury
Debbie Abrahams	Labour	Oldham East and Saddleworth	Work and Pensions
Tonia Antoniazzi	Labour	Gower	Northern Irish Affairs
Catherine Atkinson	Labour	Derby North	Justice
Olivia Bailey	Labour	Reading West and Mid Berkshire	Women and Equalities
Steve Barclay	Conservative	North East Cambridgeshire	Finance
Bob Blackman	Conservative	Harrow East	Backbench Business
Dame Karen Bradley	Conservative	Staffordshire Moorlands	Home Affairs
Liam Byrne	Labour	Birmingham Hodge Hill & Solihull North	Business and Trade
Ruth Cadbury	Labour	Brentford & Isleworth	Transport
Alistair Carmichael	Liberal Democrats	Orkney & Shetland	Environment, Food and Rural Affairs
Sarah Champion	Labour	Rotherham	International Development
Sir Geoffrey Clifton-Brown	Conservative	North Cotswolds	Public Accounts
Alberto Costa	Conservative	South Leicestershire	Standards
Tan Dhesi	Labour	Slough	Defence
Dame Caroline Dinenage	Conservative	Gosport	Culture, Media and Sport
Bill Esterson	Labour	Sefton Central	Energy Security and Net Zero
Patricia Ferguson	Labour	Glasgow West	Scottish Affairs
Helen Hayes	Labour	Dulwich and West Norwood	Education
Simon Hoare	Conservative	North Dorset	Public Administration and Constitutional Affairs
Sir Bernard Jenkin	Conservative	Harwich and North Essex	Statutory Instruments
Ruth Jones	Labour	Newport West & Islwyn	Welsh Affairs
Layla Moran	Liberal Democrats	Oxford West & Abingdon	Health and Social Care
Jessica Morden	Labour	Newport East	Selection
Chi Onwurah	Labour	Newcastle upon Tyne Central & West	Science, Innovation and Technology
Abena Oppong-Asare	Labour Co-op	Erith and Thamesmead	Levelling Up, Housing and Communities
Toby Perkins	Labour	Chesterfield	Environmental Audit
Cat Smith	Labour	Lancaster & Wyre	Procedure
Nick Smith	Labour	Blaenau Gwent and Rhymney	Administration
Jamie Stone	Liberal Democrats	Caithness, Sutherland & Easter Ross	Petitions
Dame Emily Thornberry	Labour	Islington South & Finsbury	Foreign Affairs

== See also ==
- Parliamentary committees of the United Kingdom
