= Delegated legislation committee =

A delegated legislation committee (DLC) is a general committee of the House of Commons of the United Kingdom that allows for debate of a statutory instrument, Church Measure, or other forms of delegated legislation which have been laid before the House of Commons. With respect to statutory instruments, it differs from the Joint Committee on Statutory Instruments and Commons Select Committee on Statutory Instruments in that those committees only scrutinise certain technical aspects of them. By contrast, DLCs provide a forum for discussing the merits of proposed instruments. They do not approve or reject delegated legislation, but merely debate it on a motion "That this committee has considered" the legislation. A statutory instrument or measure debated in a DLC is not normally later debated on the House floor; rather, a vote is taken without debate if one is sought.

While any Member is allowed to attend and speak, a DLC is commonly composed of seventeen Members, though this can range between sixteen and fifty Members. Only the original members are allowed to vote.

As with other general committees, the Speaker appoints the chair, and the Committee of Selection appoints the other members. Any MP may participate in proceedings of a DLC, allowing all MPs an opportunity to debate pieces of delegated legislation, but only members of the committee may vote or are counted toward the quorum. Legislation is distributed among the committees by the Speaker, but a fresh committee is nominated for each instrument (or for a small group of related instruments). Statutory instruments under the affirmative procedure are automatically referred to a DLC.

DLC's were first set up as standing committees on statutory instruments in the 1973-1947 session, to alleviate the workload of the House. These were renamed at the beginning of the 1995-1996 session to standing committees on delegated legislation, and in 2006–2007 to delegated legislation committees.

== See also ==
- Parliamentary committees of the United Kingdom
