= Innovation, Universities, Science and Skills Select Committee =

The Innovation, Universities, Science and Skills Select Committee was a select committee of the House of Commons in the Parliament of the United Kingdom. The remit of the Committee was to examine the expenditure, administration and policy of the Department for Innovation, Universities and Skills, any associated public bodies and the government office for science.

The committee was dissolved on 30 September 2009 and replaced by the Business, Innovation and Skills Select Committee following the merging of the Department for Innovation, Universities and Skills into the new Department for Business, Innovation and Skills. The committee was officially replaced by the Science and Technology Select Committee, which was re-established on 1 October 2009 and is made up of the same membership as the old Innovation, Universities, Science and Skills select committee.

== Membership ==
The membership of the committee at its time of dissolution were:

Member	Party	Constituency
Phil Willis MP, (Chair)	Liberal Democrat	Harrogate and Knaresborough
Dr Roberta Blackman-Woods MP	Labour	City of Durham
Tim Boswell MP	Conservative	Daventry
Ian Cawsey MP	Labour	Brigg and Goole
Nadine Dorries MP	Conservative	Mid-Bedfordshire
Dr Ian Gibson MP	Labour	Norwich North
Dr Evan Harris MP	Liberal Democrat	Oxford West and Abingdon
Dr Brian Iddon MP	Labour	Bolton South East
Gordon Marsden MP	Labour	Blackpool South
Bob Spink MP	Independent	Castle Point
Ian Stewart MP	Labour	Eccles
Graham Stringer MP	Labour	Manchester Blackley
Dr Desmond Turner MP	Labour	Brighton Kemptown
Rob Wilson MP	Conservative	Reading East

Source: Parliament Website

== See also ==
- Parliamentary committees of the United Kingdom
