= Education & Skills Select Committee =

Committee of the House of Commons in the Parliament of the United Kingdom

The Education & Skills Select Committee was a committee of the House of Commons in the Parliament of the United Kingdom. The official name was the House of Commons, Education and Skills Committee.

The committee was abolished as a result of the abolition of the Department for Education and Skills, whose responsibilities were split between the new Department for Children, Schools and Families and the new Department for Innovation, Universities and Skills. Committees were subsequently set up in line with the new departments.

== Remit ==
The Education and Skills Committee was one of the House of Commons Select committees related to government departments: its terms of reference were to examine "the expenditure, administration and policy of the Department for Education and Skills and its associated public bodies".

The Committee chooses its own subjects of inquiry, within the overall terms of reference. It invited written evidence from interested parties and held public evidence sessions, usually in committee rooms at the House of Commons, although it did have the power to meet away from Westminster.

At the end of each inquiry, the Committee would normally agree a Report based on the evidence received. Such reports were published and made available on the internet. Reports usually contained recommendations to the Government and other bodies. The Government by convention responded to reports within about two months of publication. These responses were also published.

== Inquiries ==
The Committee could examine any area of work related to the Department for Education and Skills and its associated public bodies, such as the Learning and Skills Council and Ofsted.

The inquiries that the committee carried out included:

- Bullying
- Citizenship education
- Prison education
- Further education
- Special Educational Needs
- Secondary education
- Teaching children to read

== See also ==
- Parliamentary committees of the United Kingdom
