= 2010 Dissolution Honours =

British government recognitions

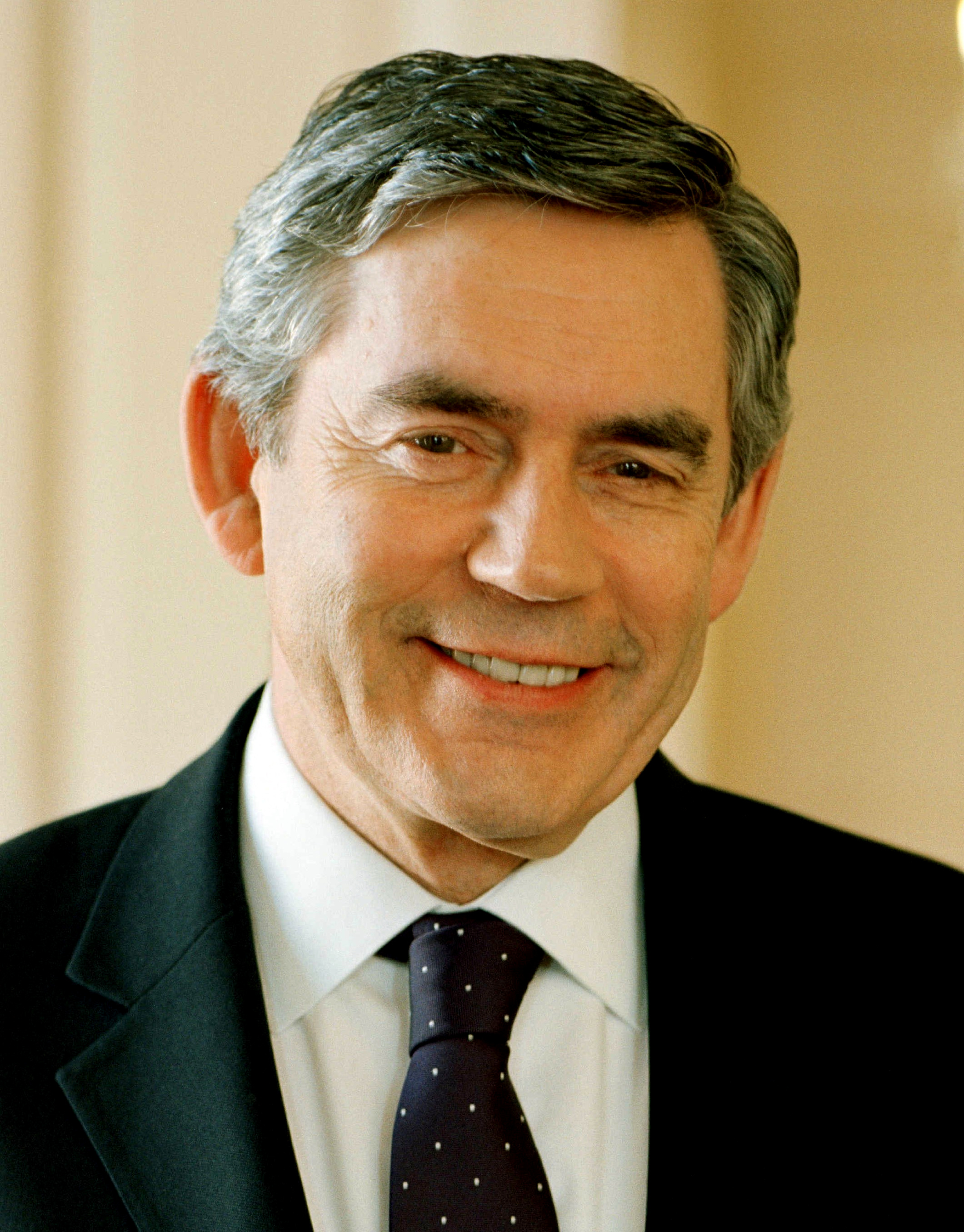
Outgoing Prime Minister Gordon Brown in 2009

The 2010 Dissolution Honours List was issued on 28 May 2010 at the advice of the outgoing Prime Minister, Gordon Brown. The list was gazetted on 15 June.

== Life peerages ==
Conservative

- Timothy Eric Boswell, former Whip and Parliamentary Secretary at the Ministry of Agriculture, Fisheries and Food.
- Angela Frances Browning, formerly Parliamentary Secretary at the Ministry of Agriculture, Fisheries and Food.
- Rt Hon. John Selwyn Gummer, formerly Minister for Agriculture, Fisheries and Food.
- Rt Hon. Michael Howard, QC, formerly Home Secretary, Leader of the Conservative Party.
- John Craddock Maples, formerly Economic Secretary.
- Sir Michael Spicer, formerly Government Minister for Housing and Chairman of Parliamentary and Scientific Committee.

Labour

- Rt Hon. Hilary Jane Armstrong, former Chancellor of the Duchy of Lancaster and Minister for Social Exclusion.
- Rt Hon. Desmond (Des) Henry Browne, former Secretary of State for Defence.
- Rt Hon. Quentin Davies, former Government Minister, Defence.
- Rt Hon. Beverley Hughes, former Minister of State, Children, Schools and Families.
- Rt Hon. John Hutton, former Secretary of State for Business.
- Rt Hon. James (Jim) Philip Knight, Former Minister of State.
- Rt Hon. Tommy McAvoy, former Government Deputy Chief Whip.
- Rt Hon. John McFall, former Chair of Treasury Select Committee and MP for West Dunbartonshire.
- Rt Hon. John Leslie Prescott, former Deputy Prime Minister and First Secretary of State.
- Rt Hon. Dr John Reid.
- Rt Hon. Angela Evans Smith (of Basildon), former Minister of State, Cabinet Office.
- Rt Hon. James Donnelly (Don) Touhig, former Parliamentary Under-Secretary of State (Minister for Veterans), Ministry of Defence.
- Rt Hon. Michael David Wills, former Minister of State, Ministry of Justice.

Liberal Democrats

- Richard Allan, former MP for Sheffield Hallam and Chair of the Information Select Committee.
- Matthew Owen John Taylor, former MP for Truro and St Austell, Chair of National Housing Federation.
- George Philip (Phil) Willis, former MP for Harrogate and Knaresborough, Former Chair of Science and Technology Select Committee.

Democratic Unionist Party

- Rt Hon. Ian R K Paisley, former First Minister and DUP Leader.

Crossbench

- Sir Ian Blair, former Commissioner of the Metropolitan Police.

== Working peers ==
Conservative

- Guy Vaughan Black, former Director of Press Complaints Commission and executive director of Telegraph Media Group.
- Dame Margaret Eaton, DBE, Chairman of Local Government Association.
- Edward Peter Lawless Faulks, QC, barrister, leading practitioner, crime and personal injuries practice.
- John Gardiner, Deputy Chief Executive of Countryside Alliance.
- Helen Margaret Newlove, campaigner against anti-social behaviour.
- Dolar Amarshi Popat, businessman, Chief Executive of TLC Group, specialising in healthcare and hospitality.
- Shireen Olive Ritchie, Local Government Councillor, specialises in areas of adult and children's social care.
- Deborah Stedman-Scott, OBE, DL, FRSA, Chief Executive of Tomorrow's People, national employment charity working in deprived areas of UK.
- Nat Wei, a member of Teach First's founding team and also a founder of Future Leaders.
- Hon Simon Adam Wolfson, Chief Executive of NEXT plc.

Labour

- Sir Jeremy Hugh Beecham, DL, senior figure in English local government and first Chairman of the Local Government Association.
- Rt Hon. Paul Boateng, former Government Minister and MP for Brent South.
- Rita Margaret Donaghy, CBE, former Chair Conciliation and Arbitration Service.
- Jeannie Drake, former Deputy General Secretary of the Communication Workers Union.
- Dr Dianne Hayter, Chair of Legal Services Consumer Panel.
- Anna Healy, former Government and political adviser, serving in numerous government departments.
- Roy Kennedy, Labour Party's Director of Finance and Compliance, long serving member of the Labour Party.
- Rt Hon. Helen Liddell, former Secretary of State for Scotland.
- Roger John Liddle, former Special Adviser on Europe.
- Rt Hon. Dr Jack Wilson McConnell, former First Minister of Scotland.
- John Monks, General Secretary, European Trade Union Confederation.
- Sue Nye, former Director of Government Relations, Prime Minister's Office.
- Maeve Sherlock OBE, former Chief Executive of the Refugee Council and Former Special Advisor to Chancellor.
- Robert Wilfrid (Wilf) Stevenson, former Director of the Smith Institute and Special Adviser to the PM.
- Margaret Wheeler, MBE, Director of Organisation and Staff Development for the public service union UNISON.
- Michael Williams, former Special Adviser on Foreign Affairs.

Liberal Democrats

- Floella Benjamin, DL, actor, presenter and campaigner for children's issues.
- Mike German, AM, former Deputy First Minister (Wales).
- Meral Hussein Ece, OBE, Local Government Councillor in Islington, advocate of equality issues.
- Sir Kenneth (Ken) Macdonald, QC, former Director of Public Prosecutions.
- Kathryn (Kate) Jane Parminter, former Chief Executive of Campaign to Protect Rural England.
- John Shipley, OBE, leading Local Government Councillor in Newcastle upon Tyne.

== Knights Bachelor ==
- William O’Brien, formerly MP for Normanton.
- The Right Honourable Ian McCartney, formerly Minister of State for the Foreign and Commonwealth Office and for the Department of Trade and Industry.

== Refusals ==
Outgoing Labour MP Keith Hill claimed he was offered a knighthood but declined it, saying he would find the title "embarrassing".
