= Committee for Privileges and Conduct =

The Committee for Privileges and Conduct was a select committee of the House of Lords in the Parliament of the United Kingdom which considered issues relating to the privileges of the House of Lords and its members, as well as having oversight for its members' conduct.

The committee and its membership was divided into the Conduct Committee and the Procedure and Privileges Committee in 2019.

== See also ==
- Parliamentary committees of the United Kingdom
