= Conduct Committee =

Select committee of the UK House of Lords

The Conduct Committee is a select committee of the House of Lords in the Parliament of the United Kingdom. It has a remit oversee the Codes of Conduct and coordinate with the House of Lords Commissioner for Standards. The committee was established in May 2019 when the Committee for Privileges and Conduct was split into the Conduct Committee and the Procedure and Privileges Committee.

== Chairs ==
Committee chairs include those listed below.

Name	Start	End	Party
The Lord Brabazon of Tara	3 June 2010	8 May 2012	Crossbench
The Lord Sewel	9 May 2012	27 July 2015	Labour
The Lord Laming	7 September 2015	31 August 2016	Crossbench
The Lord McFall of Alcluith	1 September 2016	9 May 2019	Crossbench
The Lord Mance	9 May 2019	19 January 2022	Crossbench
The Baroness Manningham-Buller	19 January 2022	20 March 2025	Crossbench
The Lord Etherton	20 March 2025	23 April 2025	Crossbench
The Lord Kakkar	23 April 2025	present	Crossbench

== Membership ==
As of May 2026, the peer membership of the committee is:

Member	Party
Lord Kakkar(Chair)	Crossbench
Baroness Grender	Liberal Democrat
Baroness Mallalieu	Labour
Lord Phillips of Worth Matravers	Crossbench
Baroness Stowell of Beeston	Conservative

The committee also includes lay members from outside the Lords.

== See also ==
- Parliamentary committees of the United Kingdom
