= Administration and Works Committee =

The Administration and Works Committee was a select committee of the House of Lords with a remit to consider administrative services, accommodation, and works within the financial and strategic framework set by the House Committee.

It was replaced with the Services Committee in August 2016.

== See also ==
- Parliamentary committees of the United Kingdom
