= Refreshment Committee =

The Refreshment Committee was a select committee of the House of Lords appointed to advise on the House's refreshment services, such restaurants in the Lords portions of the Palace of Westminster, within the strategic and financial framework established by the House Committee.

It was replaced by the Services Committee.

== See also ==
- Parliamentary committees of the United Kingdom
