= Business and Enterprise Select Committee =

The Business and Enterprise Select Committee was a select committee of the House of Commons in the Parliament of the United Kingdom. The remit of the committee was to examine the expenditure, administration and policy of the Department for Business, Enterprise and Regulatory Reform and any associated public bodies.

The committee was dissolved on 30 September 2009 and replaced by the Business, Innovation and Skills Select Committee following the abolition of the Department for Business, Enterprise and Regulatory Reform and its replacement with the Department for Business, Innovation and Skills.

== See also ==
- Parliamentary committees of the United Kingdom
