= Political and Constitutional Reform Select Committee =

The Political and Constitutional Reform Select Committee was a select committee of the House of Commons in the Parliament of the United Kingdom from 2010 to 2015.

== Remit ==
The committee was created in response to changes to the machinery of government intended to give the Deputy Prime Minister, Nick Clegg, responsibility for political and constitutional reform. The functions given to the Deputy Prime Minister were as follows:

- Introducing fixed-term Parliaments
- Legislating to hold a referendum on the alternative vote system for the House of Commons and to create fewer and more equal sized constituencies, see Parliamentary Voting System and Constituencies Act 2011
- Supporting people with disabilities in becoming MPs
- Introducing a power for people to recall their MPs
- Developing proposals for a wholly or mainly elected second chamber
- Speeding up implementation of individual voter registration
- Considering the "West Lothian question"
- Introducing a statutory register of lobbyists
- Reforming party funding
- Supporting all postal primaries

In addition, the Deputy Prime Minister had ministerial responsibility for the Boundary Commissions, the Electoral Commission, and the Independent Parliamentary Standards Authority. All these matters were within the remit of the committee.

== Membership ==
As of 30 March 2015, the membership of the committee was as follows:

Member	Party	Constituency
Graham Allen MP (Chair)	Labour	Nottingham North
Christopher Chope MP	Conservative	Christchurch
Fabian Hamilton MP	Labour	Leeds North East
Paul Flynn MP	Labour	Newport West
Andrew Turner MP	Conservative	Isle of Wight
Tracey Crouch MP	Conservative	Chatham and Aylesford
Mark Durkan MP	Social Democratic & Labour Party	Foyle
Duncan Hames MP	Liberal Democrat	Chippenham
David Morris MP	Conservative	Morecambe and Lunesdale
Bob Neill MP	Conservative	Bromley and Chislehurst
Chris Ruane MP	Labour	Vale of Clwyd

Source: Political and Constitutional Reform Committee

=== Changes ===
Occasionally, the House of Commons orders changes to be made in terms of membership of select committees, as proposed by the Committee of Selection. Such changes are shown below.

Date	Outgoing Member & Party	Constituency	→	New Member & Party	Constituency	Source
2 November 2010	Nicholas Boles MP (Conservative)	Grantham and Stamford	→	Andrew Griffiths MP (Conservative)	Burton	Hansard
8 November 2010	Catherine McKinnell MP (Labour)	Newcastle upon Tyne North	→	Fabian Hamilton MP (Labour)	Leeds North East	Hansard
1 April 2011	Sir Peter Soulsby MP (Labour)	Leicester South	→	Vacant		Vote and Proceedings
12 July 2011	Vacant		→	Yasmin Qureshi MP (Labour)	Bolton South East	Hansard
12 December 2011	Yasmin Qureshi MP (Labour)	Bolton South East	→	Paul Flynn MP (Labour)	Newport West	Hansard
31 October 2013	Eleanor Laing MP (Conservative)	Epping Forest	→	Tracey Crouch MP (Conservative)	Chatham and Aylesford	TheyWorkForYou
31 October 2013	Tristram Hunt MP (Labour)	Stoke-on-Trent Central	→	Mark Durkan MP (SDLP)	Foyle	TheyWorkForYou
31 October 2013	Andrew Griffiths MP (Conservative)	Burton	→	Vacant		TheyWorkForYou
31 October 2013	Stephen Williams MP (Liberal Democrat)	Bristol West	→	Vacant		TheyWorkForYou
10 December 2013	Vacant		→	Bob Neill MP (Conservative)	Bromley and Chislehurst	TheyWorkForYou
2014	Vacant		→	Duncan Hames MP (Liberal Democrat)	Chippenham	parliament.uk
20 January 2014	Sheila Gilmore MP (Labour)	Edinburgh East	→	Chris Ruane MP (Labour)	Vale of Clwyd	TheyWorkForYou parliament.uk
20 January 2014	Simon Hart MP (Conservative)	Carmarthen West and South Pembrokeshire	→	David Morris MP (Conservative)	Morecambe and Lunesdale	TheyWorkForYou

== See also ==
- Parliamentary committees of the United Kingdom
