= Innovation Nation =

Innovation Nation may refer to:

- CBS Dream Team's programmes on the Henry Ford Innovation Nation
- The UK Department for Innovation, Universities and Skills' white paper, Innovation Nation (2008)
