= Information Committee =

The Information Committee was a select committee of the House of Lords appointed to consider its information and communications services, including the House of Lords Library and the Parliamentary Archives subject to the strategic and financial framework set out by the House Committee.

It was replaced by the Services Committee.

== See also ==
- Parliamentary committees of the United Kingdom
