= Finance Committee (House of Lords) =

Select committee of the House of Lords

The Finance Committee is a select committee of the House of Lords in the Parliament of the United Kingdom. It supports the House of Lords Commission on considering the expenditure on services based on the Estimate for the House of Lords.

== Chairs ==
Committee chairs include those listed below.

Name	Start	End	Party
The Baroness Doocey	1 September 2016	28 January 2021	Liberal Democrats
The Lord Vaux of Harrowden	28 January 2021	31 January 2024	Crossbench
The Lord Morse	31 January 2024	present	Crossbench

== Membership ==
As of September 2026, the members of the committee are as follows:

Member	Party
Lord Morse(Chair)	Crossbench
Baroness Buscombe	Conservative
Lord Carter of Coles	Labour
Lord Kennedy of Southwark	Labour
Lord Massey of Hampstead	Conservative
Baroness McIntosh of Hudnall	Labour
Lord Redesdale	Liberal Democrat
Baroness Scott of Bybrook	Conservative
Lord Stoneham of Droxford	Liberal Democrat
Lord Young of Old Windsor	Crossbench

== See also ==
- Parliamentary committees of the United Kingdom
