= Secondary Legislation Scrutiny Committee =

The Secondary Legislation Scrutiny Committee (formerly the Merits of Statutory Instruments Committee) is a select committee of the House of Lords that refers secondary legislation, such as statutory instruments, to the House that it considers interesting or important. This is unlike the Joint Committee on Statutory Instruments and Commons Select Committee on Statutory Instruments, which only scrutinise instruments for legal and drafting defects. The specific criteria used by the committee are whether the legislation—

1. is politically or legally important or gives rise to issues of public policy likely to be of interest to the House
2. may be inappropriate in view of changed circumstances since the enactment of the parent Act
3. may inappropriately implement European Union legislation
4. may imperfectly achieve its policy objectives.

The committee meets in private on a weekly basis when the House is sitting. Secondary legislation currently being considered by the committee is listed on their website.

The committee adopted its current name on 15 May 2012 principally because of the addition of Public Bodies Orders under the Public Bodies Act 2011.

Due to the number of additional instruments specifically related to Brexit, the committee expanded into two sub-committees from October 2018 until April 2019.

== Chairs ==
Committee chairs include those listed below.

Name	Start	End	Party
The Lord Goodlad	16 May 2012	30 March 2015	Conservative
The Lord Trefgarne	8 June 2015	1 July 2019	Conservative
The Lord Hodgson of Astley Abbotts	1 July 2019	31 January 2023	Conservative
The Lord Hunt of Wirral	31 January 2023	30 January 2025	Conservative
The Lord Watson of Invergowrie	30 January 2025	present	Labour

== Membership ==
As of July 2026, the membership of the committee is:

Member	Party
Lord Watson of Invergowrie(Chair)	Labour
Baroness Bakewell of Hardington Mandeville	Liberal Democrat
Lord Blackwater	Conservative
Baroness Boycott	Crossbench
Baroness Dacres of Lewisham	Labour
Lord Evans of Guisborough	Conservative
Lord Grabiner	Crossbench
Lord John of Southwark	Labour
Lord Kempsell	Conservative
Lord Kerr of Kinlochard	Crossbench
Lord Pack	Liberal Democrat
