= Rurka =

Rurka may refer to:

- Rurka, Gryfino County, village in Poland
- Rurka, Goleniów County, village in Poland
- Rurka (Ludhiana West), village in India
- Anna Rurka (born 1978), Polish lecturer and NGO administrator
- Operation Rurka, 1939 Polish naval operation during the Battle of the Gdansk Bay
