= South East Regional Select Committee =

UK House of Commons Parliamentary Select Committee

The South East Regional Select Committee was one of nine regional select committees of the House of Commons in the Parliament of the United Kingdom. The establishment of the committee was agreed by the House of Commons on 12 November 2008, following the appointment of 'regional ministers' by Gordon Brown on his appointment as Prime Minister in June 2007. The committee came into existence on 1 January 2009 and ceased to exist upon the dissolution of Parliament on 12 April 2010.

The purpose of the Committee was "to examine regional strategies and the work of regional bodies" in the South East.

== Membership ==
The committee was first appointed on 3 March 2009 by the House of Commons, but only contained 5 Labour members as opposed to the 9 members from various parties as was agreed in the motion of 12 November 2008, due to the Conservatives and Liberal Democrats refusing to nominate any members as a sign of their opposition to the existence of regional committees.

Member	Party	Constituency
Dr Stephen Ladyman MP (Chair)	Labour	South Thanet
Celia Barlow MP	Labour	Hove
David Lepper MP	Labour	Brighton Pavilion
Gwyn Prosser MP	Labour	Dover
Andrew Smith MP	Labour	Oxford East

Source: Parliament website
