= Wright Committee =

The Reform of the House of Commons Committee (known informally as the Wright Committee after its chair, Tony Wright) was a Select committee of the UK Parliament. It was established in 2009 to improve the procedures and relevance of Parliament. It reported on 12 November 2009 and made a number of recommendations, in a document entitled 'Rebuilding the House'.

These included:

- Reduction in the number of committees and in the size of a standard departmental committee, possibly to eleven members
- Chairs of departmental and similar select committees should be directly elected by secret ballot of the House using the alternative vote
- Members of departmental and similar committees should be elected from within party groups by secret ballot
- Backbench business should be scheduled by the House rather than by Ministers
- The House should decide its sitting pattern for itself
- An effective e-petitions system should be introduced, including the possibility that members of the public might be able to compel an issue to be debated in the House
- One backbench motion per month should be routinely scheduled for debate

The general theme is that the House should have much more scope to choose and schedule its own activities. In May 2010, the incoming coalition Conservative and Liberal Democrat government agreed to bring forward the Wright Committee's recommendations in full.
