= Science, Innovation and Technology Select Committee =

UK House of Commons select committee

The Science, Innovation and Technology Select Committee is a select committee of the House of Commons in the Parliament of the United Kingdom.

The original Science and Technology Committee was abolished upon the creation of the Innovation, Universities, Science and Skills Committee on 6 November 2007. However, just 19 months later, the government announced that it was re-establishing the committee following the recommendation of the Innovation, Universities, Science and Skills Committee after the merging of the Department for Business, Enterprise and Regulatory Reform and the Department for Innovation, Universities and Skills in June 2009. The House of Commons approved the re-establishment of the committee on 25 June 2009. The committee was officially re-established on 1 October 2009 and has a remit to examine the work of the Government Office for Science. The committee currently scrutinises the Department for Business, Innovation, Science and Trade, headed by the Secretary of State for Business, Innovation, Science and Trade, Jonathan Reynolds.

== Chairs ==
Committee chairs include those listed below.

Name	Start	End	Party	Constituency
Arthur Palmer	1 November 1978	4 April 1979	Labour	Bristol North East
Giles Shaw	27 April 1992	21 March 1997	Conservative	Pudsey
Michael Clark	14 July 1997	11 May 2001	Conservative	Rayleigh
Ian Gibson	16 July 2001	11 April 2005	Labour	Norwich North
Phil Willis	13 July 2005	6 May 2010	Liberal Democrats	Harrogate and Knaresborough
Andrew Miller	10 June 2010	30 March 2015	Labour	Ellesmere Port and Neston
Nicola Blackwood	18 June 2015	19 July 2016	Conservative	Oxford West and Abingdon
Stephen Metcalfe	19 October 2016	3 May 2017	Conservative	South Basildon and East Thurrock
Norman Lamb	12 July 2017	6 November 2019	Liberal Democrats	North Norfolk
Greg Clark	29 January 2020	30 May 2024	Conservative	Tunbridge Wells
Chi Onwurah	11 September 2024	present	Labour	Newcastle upon Tyne Central and West

== Membership ==
Membership of the committee is as follows:

=== 2024–present Parliament ===
Member	Party	Constituency
Chi Onwurah MP (Chair)	Labour	Newcastle upon Tyne Central and West
Tom Collins MP	Labour	Worcester
Emily Darlington MP	Labour	Milton Keynes Central
Maya Ellis MP	Labour	Ribble Valley
George Freeman MP	Conservative	Mid Norfolk
Kit Malthouse MP	Conservative	North West Hampshire
Samantha Niblett MP	Labour	South Derbyshire
Freddie van Mierlo MP	Liberal Democrats	Henley and Thame
Martin Wrigley MP	Liberal Democrats	Newton Abbot
Steve Yemm MP	Labour	Mansfield
Daniel Zeichner MP	Labour	Cambridge

==== Changes since 2024 ====
Date	Outgoing Member & Party	Constituency	→	New Member & Party	Constituency	Source
9 December 2024	Josh Simons MP (Labour)	Makerfield	→	Jon Pearce MP (Labour)	High Peak	Hansard
27 October 2025	Steve Race MP (Labour)	Exeter	→	Samantha Niblett MP (Labour)	South Derbyshire	Hansard
27 October 2025	Jon Pearce MP (Labour)	High Peak	→	Daniel Zeichner MP (Labour)	Cambridge	Hansard
13 November 2025	Tom Gordon MP (Liberal Democrats)	Harrogate and Knaresborough	→	Freddie van Mierlo MP (Liberal Democrats)	Henley and Thame	Hansard
22 June 2026	Lauren Sullivan MP (Labour)	Gravesham	→	Tom Collins MP (Labour)	Worcester	Hansard
22 June 2026	Adam Thompson MP (Labour)	Erewash	→	Maya Ellis MP (Labour)	Ribble Valley	Hansard
11 November 2026	Allison Gardner MP (Labour)	Stoke-on-Trent South	→	Steve Yemm MP (Labour)	Mansfield	Hansard

=== 2019–2024 Parliament ===
The chair was elected on 29 January 2020, with the members of the committee being announced on 2 March 2020.

Member	Party	Constituency
Greg Clark MP (Chair)	Conservative	Tunbridge Wells
Aaron Bell MP	Conservative	Newcastle-under-Lyme
Chris Clarkson MP	Conservative	Heywood and Middleton
Katherine Fletcher MP	Conservative	South Ribble
Andrew Griffith MP	Conservative	Arundel and South Downs
Darren Jones MP	Labour	Bristol North West
Mark Logan MP	Conservative	Bolton North East
Carol Monaghan MP	SNP	Glasgow North West
Chi Onwurah MP	Labour	Newcastle upon Tyne Central
Graham Stringer MP	Labour	Blackley and Broughton
Zarah Sultana MP	Labour	Coventry South

==== Changes 2019–2024 ====
Date	Outgoing Member & Party	Constituency	→	New Member & Party	Constituency	Source
11 May 2020	Chi Onwurah MP (Labour)	Newcastle upon Tyne Central	→	Dawn Butler MP (Labour)	Brent Central	Hansard
22 February 2021	Darren Jones MP (Labour)	Bristol North West	→	Rebecca Long-Bailey MP (Labour)	Salford and Eccles	Hansard
19 October 2021	Andrew Griffith MP (Conservative)	Arundel and South Downs	→	Dehenna Davison MP (Conservative)	Bishop Auckland	Hansard
17 May 2022	Mark Logan MP (Conservative)	Bolton North East	→	Tracey Crouch MP (Conservative)	Chatham and Aylesford	Hansard
13 July 2022	Greg Clark MP (Chair, Conservative)	Tunbridge Wells	→	Vacant		Hansard
11 October 2022	Vacant		→	Greg Clark MP (Chair, Conservative)	Tunbridge Wells	Hansard
25 October 2022	Dehenna Davison MP (Conservative)	Bishop Auckland	→	Stephen Metcalfe MP (Conservative)	South Basildon and East Thurrock	Hansard
25 October 2022	Katherine Fletcher MP (Conservative)	South Ribble	→	Iain Stewart MP (Conservative)	Milton Keynes South	Hansard
29 November 2022	Zarah Sultana MP (Labour)	Coventry South	→	Christian Wakeford MP (Labour)	Bury South	Hansard
9 January 2023	Iain Stewart MP (Conservative)	Milton Keynes South	→	Katherine Fletcher MP (Conservative)	South Ribble	Hansard
11 December 2023	Aaron Bell MP (Conservative)	Newcastle-under-Lyme	→	James Davies MP (Conservative)	Vale of Clwyd	Hansard

=== 2017–2019 Parliament ===
The election of the chair took place on 12 July 2017, with the members of the committee being announced on 11 September 2017.

Member	Party	Constituency
Rt. Hon. Sir Norman Lamb MP (Chair)	Liberal Democrat	North Norfolk
Vicky Ford MP	Conservative	Chelmsford
Bill Grant MP	Conservative	Ayr, Carrick and Cumnock
Darren Jones MP	Labour	Bristol North West
Liz Kendall MP	Labour	Leicester West
Stephen Metcalfe MP	Conservative	South Basildon and East Thurrock
Carol Monaghan MP	SNP	Glasgow North West
Damien Moore MP	Conservative	Southport
Neil O'Brien MP	Conservative	Harborough
Graham Stringer MP	Labour	Blackley and Broughton
Martin Whitfield MP	Labour	East Lothian

==== Changes 2017–2019 ====
Date	Outgoing Member & Party	Constituency	→	New Member & Party	Constituency	Source
16 October 2017	New seat		→	Vicky Ford MP (Conservative)	Chelmsford	Hansard
16 October 2017	New seat		→	Adam Holloway MP (Conservative)	Gravesham	Hansard
16 October 2017	New seat		→	Stephanie Peacock MP (Labour)	Barnsley East	Hansard
4 December 2017	Stephanie Peacock MP (Labour)	Barnsley East	→	Carol Monaghan MP (SNP)	Glasgow North West	Hansard
22 January 2018	Adam Holloway MP (Conservative)	Gravesham	→	Damien Moore MP (Conservative)	Southport	Hansard
27 March 2018	Clive Lewis MP (Labour)	Norwich South	→	Liz Kendall MP (Labour)	Leicester West	Hansard
21 January 2019	Neil O'Brien MP (Conservative)	Harborough	→	Sam Gyimah MP (Conservative)	East Surrey	Hansard

=== 2015–2017 Parliament ===
The chair was elected on 18 June 2015, with members being announced on 13 July 2015.

Member	Party	Constituency
Nicola Blackwood MP (Chair)	Conservative	Oxford West and Abingdon
Victoria Borwick MP	Conservative	Kensington
Jim Dowd MP	Labour	Lewisham West and Penge
Chris Green MP	Conservative	Bolton West
Liz McInnes MP	Labour	Heywood and Middleton
Dr Tania Mathias MP	Conservative	Twickenham
Carol Monaghan MP	SNP	Glasgow North West
Graham Stringer MP	Labour	Blackley and Broughton
Derek Thomas MP	Conservative	St Ives
Matt Warman MP	Conservative	Boston and Skegness
Daniel Zeichner MP	Labour	Cambridge

==== Changes 2015–2017 ====
Date	Outgoing Member & Party	Constituency	→	New Member & Party	Constituency	Source
26 October 2015	Liz McInnes MP (Labour)	Heywood and Middleton	→	Stella Creasy MP (Labour and Co-op)	Walthamstow	Hansard
26 October 2015	Daniel Zeichner MP (Labour)	Cambridge	→	Valerie Vaz MP (Labour)	Walsall South	Hansard
18 July 2016	Valerie Vaz MP (Labour)	Walsall South	→	Dr Roberta Blackman-Woods MP (Labour)	City of Durham	Hansard
19 July 2016	Nicola Blackwood MP (Conservative)	Oxford West and Abingdon	→	Vacant		Hansard
19 October 2016	Vacant		→	Stephen Metcalfe MP (Chair) (Conservative)	South Basildon and East Thurrock	Hansard
13 March 2017	Dr Roberta Blackman-Woods MP (Labour)	City of Durham	→	Gareth Snell MP (Labour and Co-op)	Stoke-on-Trent Central	Hansard

=== 2010–2015 Parliament ===
The chair was elected on 10 June 2010, with members being announced on 12 July 2010.

Member	Party	Constituency
Andrew Miller MP (Chair)	Labour	Ellesmere Port and Neston
Gavin Barwell MP	Conservative	Croydon Central
Gregg McClymont MP	Labour	Cumbernauld, Kilsyth and Kirkintilloch East
Stephen Metcalfe MP	Conservative	South Basildon and East Thurrock
David Morris MP	Conservative	Morecambe and Lunesdale
Stephen Mosley MP	Conservative	City of Chester
Pamela Nash MP	Labour	Airdrie and Shotts
Jonathan Reynolds MP	Labour and Co-op	Stalybridge and Hyde
Alok Sharma MP	Conservative	Reading West
Graham Stringer MP	Labour	Blackley and Broughton
Roger Williams MP	Liberal Democrat	Brecon and Radnorshire

==== Changes 2010–2015 ====
Date	Outgoing Member & Party	Constituency	→	New Member & Party	Constituency	Source
14 February 2011	Alok Sharma MP (Conservative)	Reading West	→	Stephen McPartland MP (Conservative)	Stevenage	Hansard
27 February 2012	Gavin Barwell MP (Conservative)	Croydon Central	→	Caroline Dinenage MP (Conservative)	Gosport	Hansard
27 February 2012	Stephen McPartland MP (Conservative)	Stevenage	→	Gareth Johnson MP (Conservative)	Dartford	Hansard
27 February 2012	David Morris MP (Conservative)	Morecambe and Lunesdale	→	Sarah Newton MP (Conservative)	Truro and Falmouth	Hansard
27 February 2012	Gregg McClymont MP (Labour)	Cumbernauld, Kilsyth and Kirkintilloch East	→	Hywel Williams MP (Plaid Cymru)	Arfon	Hansard
11 June 2012	Jonathan Reynolds MP (Labour Co-op)	Stalybridge and Hyde	→	Jim Dowd MP (Labour)	Lewisham West and Penge	Hansard
3 December 2012	Gareth Johnson MP (Conservative)	Dartford	→	David Morris MP (Conservative)	Morecambe and Lunesdale	Hansard
4 February 2013	Caroline Dinenage MP (Conservative)	Gosport	→	David Tredinnick MP (Conservative)	Bosworth	Hansard
25 November 2013	Roger Williams MP (Liberal Democrats)	Brecon and Radnorshire	→	David Heath MP (Liberal Democrats)	Somerton and Frome	Hansard
20 October 2014	Hywel Williams MP (Plaid Cymru)	Arfon	→	Vacant		Hansard
24 November 2014	David Morris MP (Conservative)	Morecambe and Lunesdale	→	Vacant		Hansard
1 December 2014	Vacant		→	Dan Byles MP (Conservative)	North Warwickshire	Hansard

== See also ==
- Parliamentary committees of the United Kingdom
- Science and Technology Committee (House of Lords)
- Science and technology
