= East Midlands Regional Select Committee =

Select committee of the UK House of Commons, 2009–2010

The East Midlands Regional Select Committee was one of nine regional select committees of the House of Commons in the Parliament of the United Kingdom. The establishment of the committee was agreed by the House of Commons on 12 November 2008, following the appointment of 'regional ministers' by Gordon Brown on his appointment as Prime Minister in June 2007. The committee came into existence on 1 January 2009 and ceased to exist upon the dissolution of Parliament on 12 April 2010.

The purpose of the Committee was "to examine regional strategies and the work of regional bodies" in the East Midlands.

== Membership ==
The committee was first appointed on 3 March 2009 by the House of Commons, but only contained 5 Labour members as opposed to the 9 members from various parties as was agreed in the motion of 12 November 2008, due to the Conservatives and Liberal Democrats refusing to nominate any members as a sign of their opposition to the existence of regional committees.

Member	Party	Constituency
Paddy Tipping MP (Chair)	Labour	Sherwood
John Heppell MP	Labour	Nottingham East
Bob Laxton MP	Labour	Derby North
Judy Mallaber MP	Labour	Amber Valley
Sir Peter Soulsby MP	Labour	Leicester South

Source: Parliament website
