= Anna Rurka =

Former President of INGOs conference

Anna Rurka (born 20 March 1978) in Warsaw, Poland, is a former President of INGOs Conference of the Council of Europe. She is a senior lecturer at the University Paris-Nanterre and Vice President of the European Committee for Home-based Priority Action for the Child and the Family.
