= House of Lords Commission =

Select committee on strategic direction

The House of Lords Commission is a select committee of the House of Lords which provides strategic and political direction for the House of Lords Administration. Its remit also includes approving the annual Estimate, overseeing financial support arrangements for peers, and delegate various functions to the Services, Finance, and Audit committees.

The House of Lords Commission replaced the House Committee.

== Chairs ==
Committee chairs include those listed below.

| Name | Start | End | Party |
|---|---|---|---|
| The Lord Fowler | 1 September 2016 | 29 April 2021 | Crossbench |
| The Lord McFall of Alcluith | 13 May 2021 | 3 February 2026 | Crossbench |
| The Lord Forsyth of Drumlean | 3 February 2026 | present | Crossbench |

== Membership ==
As of May 2026, the peer membership of the committee is as follows:

| Member | Party |
|---|---|
| Lord Forsyth of Drumlean(Chair) | Lord Speaker |
| Earl of Kinnoull | Crossbench |
| Lord McLoughlin | Conservative |
| Lord Morse | Crossbench |
| Baroness Pitkeathley | Labour |
| Lord Ponsonby of Shulbrede | Non-affiliated |
| Lord Purvis of Tweed | Liberal Democrat |
| Baroness Scott of Needham Market | Liberal Democrat |
| Baroness Smith of Basildon | Labour |
| Lord True | Conservative |

The committee also includes external members who are not peers or members of Parliament.

== See also ==
- Parliamentary committees of the United Kingdom
- House of Commons Commission
- Scottish Parliamentary Corporate Body
- Senedd Commission
- Northern Ireland Assembly Commission
