= South West Regional Select Committee =

The South West Regional Select Committee was one of nine regional select committees of the House of Commons in the Parliament of the United Kingdom. The establishment of the committee was agreed by the House of Commons on 12 November 2008, following the appointment of 'regional ministers' by Gordon Brown on his appointment as Prime Minister in June 2007. The committee came into existence on 1 January 2009 and ceased to exist upon the dissolution of Parliament on 12 April 2010.

The purpose of the Committee was "to examine regional strategies and the work of regional bodies" in the South West.

== Membership ==
The committee was first appointed on 3 March 2009 by the House of Commons, but only contained 5 Labour members as opposed to the 9 members from various parties as was agreed in the motion of 12 November 2008, due to the Conservatives and Liberal Democrats refusing to nominate any members as a sign of their opposition to the existence of regional committees.

Member	Party	Constituency
Alison Seabeck MP (Chair)	Labour	Plymouth Devonport
Roger Berry MP	Labour	Kingswood
David Drew MP	Labour	Stroud
Kerry McCarthy MP	Labour	Bristol East
Doug Naysmith MP	Labour	Bristol North West

Source: Parliament website

=== Changes ===
Occasionally, the House of Commons orders changes to be made in terms of membership of select committees, as proposed by the Leader of the House. Such changes are shown below.

Date	Outgoing Member & Party	Constituency	→	New Member & Party	Constituency	Source
10 November 2009	Linda Gilroy MP (Labour)	Plymouth Sutton	→	Roger Berry MP (Labour)	Kingswood	Hansard
