= Committee of Selection (House of Commons) =

Select Committee of the House of Commons

The Committee of Selection is a select committee of the House of Commons in the Parliament of the United Kingdom. Unlike the Commons' other select committees, the Committee of Selection exists by virtue of the House's Standing Orders for Private Business, its rules for bills that affect only specific organizations or individuals. Despite that, the committee is best known for appointing members of committees established under resolutions of the House and the Standing Orders for Public Business.

Members of the Committee of Selection are nominated by a motion tabled and moved by a member of the Government. In the same way, the Government also nominates members to the Liaison Committee, the Committee on Standards, the Committee of Privileges, and committees established by a temporary standing order, although on occasion the Committee of Selection has been tasked with performing such nominations. As the Committee of Selection is not covered by Standing Order No. 122B, its chair is chosen by the members of the committee itself unless the House orders otherwise.

After the non-Chair members of other select committees have been chosen via elections within each party, a motion setting out membership of each committee is tabled and moved on behalf of the Committee of Selection by one of its members.

With few exceptions, notably the Committee of Selection itself, the standards committee, the privileges committee and the Liaison Committee, only members of the committee acting on its behalf may nominate new members to committees or propose the discharge of members. Appointments to select committees are made through motions put before the House of Commons, while appointments to general committees (such as public bill committees) are made by the committee's own authority. With respect to private business, all private bills are automatically referred to the committee, which in turn either refers unopposed bills to the Unopposed Bill Committee and refers opposed bills to committees whose members it also appoints.

== Role in the selection of public bill committees ==
The Committee of Selection performs a crucial, yet often overlooked function in scrutinising legislation. The current structure of the committee is dominated by party whips. This means that the government effectively chooses which MPs will scrutinise its bills. Advocates of reform highlight that the current organisation of the committee means that MPs who are subject specialists or may hold views contrary to the leadership of their party can be kept off public bill committees. Suggested reforms include limiting the number of whips that can serve on the committee and allowing MPs a vote on public bill committee nominations.

== Chairs ==
Committee chairs include those listed below.

Name	Start	End	Party	Constituency
Rosemary McKenna	2005	2010	Labour	Cumbernauld, Kilsyth and Kirkintilloch East
Geoffrey Clifton-Brown	2010	2015	Conservative	The Cotswolds
Bill Wiggin	24 June 2015	30 May 2024	Conservative	North Herefordshire
Jessica Morden	11 September 2024	present	Labour	Newport East

== Current members ==
Members are elected at the beginning of each session. As of May 2026 the committee's membership is as follows:

Member	Party	Constituency
Jessica Morden MP (chair)	Labour	Newport East
Jade Botterill MP	Labour	Ossett and Denby Dale
Emma Foody MP	Labour	Cramlington and Killingworth
Gen Kitchen MP	Labour	Wellingborough and Rushden
Tom Morrison MP	Liberal Democrats	Cheadle
David Simmonds MP	Conservative	Ruislip, Northwood and Pinner
Rebecca Smith MP	Conservative	South West Devon
Mark Tami MP	Labour	Alyn and Deeside
Christian Wakeford MP	Labour	Bury South

=== Changes since 2024 ===
Date	Outgoing Member & Party	Constituency	→	New Member & Party	Constituency	Source
18 November 2024	Rebecca Harris MP (Conservative)	Castle Point	→	Mike Wood MP (Conservative)	Kingswinford and South Staffordshire	Hansard
28 April 2025	Charlie Maynard MP (Liberal Democrats)	Witney	→	Tom Morrison MP (Liberal Democrats)	Cheadle	Hansard
28 April 2025	Joy Morrissey MP (Conservative)	Beaconsfield	→	Paul Holmes MP (Conservative)	Hamble Valley	Hansard
24 June 2025	Vicky Foxcroft MP (Labour)	Lewisham North	→	Christian Wakeford MP (Labour)	Bury South	Hansard
9 September 2025	Chris Elmore MP (Labour)	Bridgend	→	Lilian Greenwood MP (Labour)	Nottingham South	Hansard
9 September 2025	Samantha Dixon MP (Labour)	Chester North and Neston	→	Nesil Caliskan MP (Labour)	Barking	Hansard
9 September 2025	Jeff Smith MP (Labour)	Manchester Withington	→	Gen Kitchen MP (Labour)	Wellingborough and Rushden	Hansard
24 March 2026	Paul Holmes MP (Conservative)	Hamble Valley	→	Jerome Mayhew MP (Conservative)	Broadland and Fakenham	Hansard
18 May 2026	Nesil Caliskan MP (Labour)	Barking	→	Deirdre Costigan MP (Labour)	Ealing Southall	Hansard
2 September 2026	Deirdre Costigan MP (Labour)	Ealing Southall	→	Jade Botterill MP (Labour)	Ossett and Denby Dale	Hansard
2 September 2026	Lilian Greenwood MP (Labour)	Nottingham South	→	Emma Foody MP (Labour)	Cramlington and Killingworth	Hansard
8 September 2026	Jerome Mayhew MP (Conservative)	Broadland and Fakenham	→	David Simmonds MP (Conservative)	Ruislip, Northwood and Pinner	Hansard
8 September 2026	Mike Wood MP (Conservative)	Kingswinford and South Staffordshire	→	Rebecca Smith MP (Conservative)	South West Devon	Hansard

== Former members ==
=== 2019-2024 ===
Member	Party	Constituency
Bill Wiggin MP (chair)	Conservative	North Herefordshire
Jo Churchill MP	Conservative	Bury St Edmunds
Chris Elmore MP	Labour	Ogmore
Nigel Huddleston MP	Conservative	Mid Worcestershire
Lilian Greenwood MP	Labour	Nottingham South
Rebecca Harris MP	Conservative	Castle Point
Mark Tami MP	Labour	Alyn and Deeside
Richard Thomson MP	Scottish National Party	Gordon
Craig Whittaker MP	Conservative	Calder Valley

=== 2017-2019 ===
Member	Party	Constituency
Bill Wiggin MP (Chair)	Conservative	North Herefordshire
Alan Campbell MP	Labour	Tynemouth
Jackie Doyle-Price MP	Conservative	Thurrock
David Evennett MP	Conservative	Erith and Crayford
Anne Milton MP	Conservative	Guildford
Jessica Morden MP	Labour	Newport East
Julian Smith MP	Conservative	Skipton and Ripon
Mark Tami MP	Labour	Alyn and Deeside
Owen Thompson MP	Scottish National Party	Midlothian

=== 2015-2017 ===
Member	Party	Constituency
Geoffrey Clifton-Brown MP (Chair)	Conservative	Cotswold
Heidi Alexander MP	Labour	Lewisham East
Tom Blenkinsop MP	Labour	Middlesbrough South and East Cleveland
Alan Campbell MP	Labour	Tynemouth
David Evennett MP	Conservative	Erith and Crayford
Greg Hands MP	Conservative	Chelsea and Fulham
Mark Hunter MP	Liberal Democrat	Cheadle
Anne Milton MP	Conservative	Guildford
Mark Tami MP	Labour	Alyn and Deeside

=== 2010-2015 ===
Member	Party	Constituency
Geoffrey Clifton-Brown MP (Chair)	Conservative	Cotswold
Heidi Alexander MP	Labour	Lewisham East
Tom Blenkinsop MP	Labour	Middlesbrough South and East Cleveland
Alan Campbell MP	Labour	Tynemouth
David Evennett MP	Conservative	Erith and Crayford
Mark Hunter MP	Liberal Democrat	Cheadle
Anne Milton MP	Conservative	Guildford
John Randall MP	Conservative	Uxbridge and South Ruislip
Mark Tami MP	Labour	Alyn and Deeside

=== 2005-2010 ===
Member	Party	Constituency
Rosemary McKenna MP (Chair)	Labour	Cumbernauld, Kilsyth and Kirkintilloch East

== See also ==
- Parliamentary committees of the United Kingdom
