= Science and Technology Committee (House of Lords) =

The Science and Technology Committee is a select committee of the House of Lords in the Parliament of the United Kingdom. It has a broad remit "to consider science and technology".

== Chairs ==
Committee chairs include those listed below.

Name	Start	End	Party
The Lord Krebs	22 June 2010	14 May 2014	Crossbench
The Earl of Selborne	12 June 2014	27 April 2017	Conservative
The Lord Patel	27 June 2017	19 January 2022	Crossbench
The Baroness Brown of Cambridge	19 January 2022	30 January 2025	Crossbench
The Lord Mair	30 January 2025	present	Crossbench

== Membership ==
As of May 2026, the membership of the committee is as follows:

Member	Party
Lord Mair(Chair)	Crossbench
Lord Berkeley	Labour
Lord Booth	Conservative
Lord Drayson	Labour
Lord Duncan of Springbank	Conservative
Baroness Jones of Whitchurch	Labour
Baroness Nicholson of Winterbourne	Conservative
Lord Patel	Crossbench
Lord Ranger of Northwood	Conservative
Lord Stern of Brentford	Crossbench
Lord Verjee	Liberal Democrat
Lord Willis of Knaresborough	Liberal Democrat
Baroness Willis of Summertown	Crossbench
Lord Winston	Labour

== See also ==
- Parliamentary committees of the United Kingdom
- Science and Technology Committee (House of Commons)
