= Anita Gale, Baroness Gale =

British politician (born 1940)

The Right Honourable The Baroness Gale
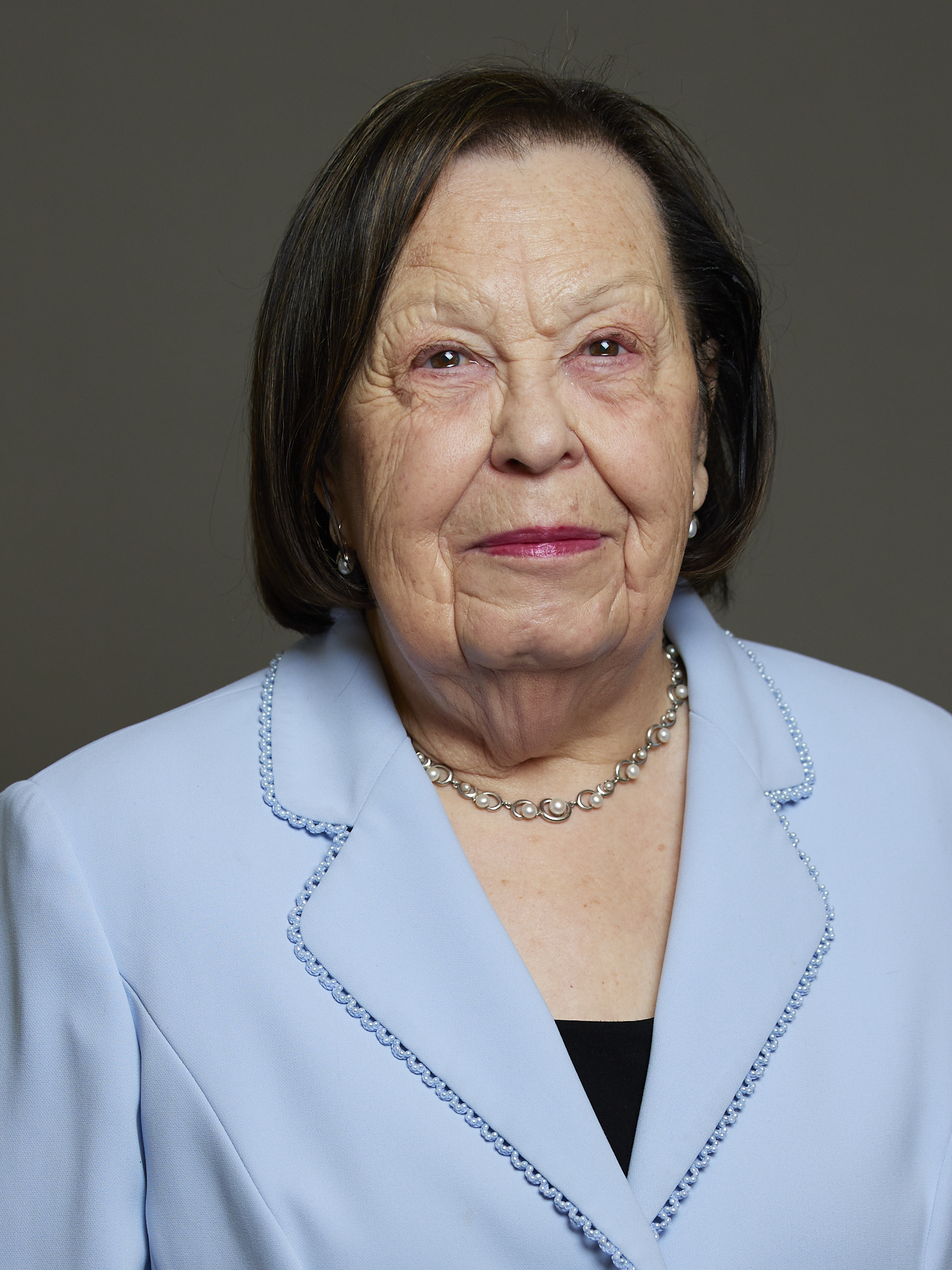
- Official portrait, 2022

Member of the House of Lords
- Lord Temporal
- Life peerage 4 August 1999

Personal details
- Born: Anita Gale; 28 November 1940 (age 85)
- Party: Labour

Anita Gale, Baroness Gale (born 28 November 1940) is a Labour Party member of the House of Lords.

As a Labour Party member, Gale became involved in women's issues in the Women's Section of the party. From 1976 to 1999 she worked full-time for the Labour Party, first as the Women's Officer for Wales, and from 1984 as the General Secretary for Wales - retiring from the post in 1999, and was appointed a life peer on 4 August 1999 as Baroness Gale, of Blaenrhondda in the County of Mid Glamorgan.

During the initial professional career, Gale commenced employment as a sewing machinist at the age of 15 within a nearby clothing factory. During her marriage and the birth of her two children, she worked as a shop assistant. Upon resuming her career, she was elected as a shop steward representing the Tailors and Garment Workers’ Union, a membership she maintained until 1970. She studied economics and politics at Pontypridd Technical College and University College Cardiff from 1970 to 1976. After graduation in 1976, Gale assumed the role of Women’s Officer within the Wales Labour Party. Over the course of eight years, she ascended to the position of General Secretary, a role she occupied until her appointment as a Peer.

In 2005, Gale was honored with the Val Feld Welsh Woman of the Year Award, acknowledging her substantial contributions toward advancing women's causes in Wales.

She has held the roles of Chair of the All Party Parliamentary group on Parkinson's, president of the National Association of Old Age Pensioners, Wales, and president of the Treherbert and District branch of the British Legion.

In 2010 she became Opposition Front Bench spokesperson on Wales and Equalities.

Party political offices
Preceded by Hubert Morgan	General Secretary of Welsh Labour; 1984–1999	Succeeded by Jessica Morden
