= Administration Committee =

Select committee of the UK House of Commons

The Administration Committee is a select committee of the House of Commons in the Parliament of the United Kingdom. It has a remit "to consider the services provided for and by the House of Commons".

This is a cross-party committee that is made of eleven backbench members. Starting in 2015, the committee chair is whichever member also sits on the House of Commons Commission.

There are weekly meetings held in private, with occasional evidence sessions held publicly. It is considered an inward-facing 'Domestic Committee'. The members are an advisory committee to the House of Commons Commission whose work encompasses many topics, including:

- Catering and banqueting
- Visitor services and retail
- Digital services
- Broadcasting of Parliament
- Education and public outreach and engagement
- Rules of access and use of facilities
- Management of the buildings and facilities which make up the Parliamentary Estate

== Chairs ==
Committee chairs include those listed below.

Name	Start	End	Party	Constituency
Stan Orme	1 January 1991	1 January 1992	Labour	Salford East
Michael Martin	1 January 1992	21 March 1997	Labour	Glasgow Springburn
Marion Roe	28 July 1997	12 July 2005	Conservative	Broxbourne
Frank Doran	18 July 2005	6 May 2010	Labour	Aberdeen North
Alan Haselhurst	27 July 2010	30 March 2015	Conservative	Saffron Walden
Paul Beresford	21 July 2015	6 November 2019	Conservative	Mole Valley
Charles Walker	18 March 2020	30 May 2024	Conservative	Broxbourne
Nick Smith	26 November 2024	present	Labour	Blaenau Gwent and Rhymney

== Membership ==
Membership of the committee is as follows:

Member	Party	Constituency
Nick Smith MP (Chair)	Labour	Blaenau Gwent and Rhymney
Alex Barros-Curtis MP	Labour	Cardiff West
Bob Blackman MP	Conservative	Harrow East
Bambos Charalambous MP	Labour	Southgate and Wood Green
Alberto Costa MP	Conservative	South Leicestershire
Mary Glindon MP	Labour	Newcastle upon Tyne East and Wallsend
Marie Goldman MP	Liberal Democrats	Chelmsford
Carolyn Harris MP	Labour	Swansea East
Navendu Mishra MP	Labour	Stockport
Tessa Munt MP	Liberal Democrats	Wells and Mendip Hills
Kirsteen Sullivan MP	Labour	Bathgate and Linlithgow

=== Changes since 2024 ===
Date	Outgoing Member & Party	Constituency	→	New Member & Party	Constituency	Source
31 March 2025	Gill Furniss MP (Labour)	Sheffield Brightside and Hillsborough	→	Bambos Charalambous MP (Labour)	Southgate and Wood Green	Hansard
28 April 2025	Joe Morris MP (Labour)	Hexham	→	Kirsteen Sullivan MP (Labour)	Bathgate and Linlithgow	Hansard
12 January 2026	Max Wilkinson MP (Liberal Democrats)	Cheltenham	→	Marie Goldman MP (Liberal Democrats)	Chelmsford	Hansard

== 2019–2024 Parliament ==
As of July 2022, the members of the committee are as follows:

Member	Party	Constituency
Sir Charles Walker MP (Chair)	Conservative	Broxbourne
John Cryer MP	Labour	Leyton and Wanstead
Michael Fabricant MP	Conservative	Lichfield
Marion Fellows MP	SNP	Motherwell and Wishaw
Colleen Fletcher MP	Labour	Coventry North East
Rt Hon. Sir Greg Knight MP	Conservative	East Yorkshire
Pauline Latham MP	Conservative	Mid Derbyshire
Rt Hon. Maria Miller MP	Conservative	Basingstoke
Jessica Morden MP	Labour	Newport East
Rt Hon. Mark Tami MP	Labour	Alyn and Deeside
Giles Watling MP	Conservative	Clacton

== 2017–2019 Parliament ==
Members were announced on 30 October 2017.

Member	Party	Constituency
Paul Beresford MP (Chair)	Conservative	Mole Valley
David Amess MP	Conservative	Southend West
Sarah Champion MP	Labour	Rotherham
John Cryer MP	Labour	Leyton and Wanstead
Michael Fabricant MP	Conservative	Lichfield
Colleen Fletcher MP	Labour	Coventry North East
Pauline Latham MP	Conservative	Mid Derbyshire
Jessica Morden MP	Labour	Newport East
Mary Robinson MP	Conservative	Cheadle
Mark Tami MP	Labour	Alyn and Deeside

=== Changes 2017-2019 ===
Date	Outgoing Member & Party	Constituency	→	New Member & Party	Constituency	Source
6 November 2017	New seat		→	Patrick Grady MP (SNP)	Glasgow North	Hansard
22 October 2018	Patrick Grady MP (SNP)	Glasgow North	→	Marion Fellows MP (SNP)	Motherwell and Wishaw	Hansard

== 2015–2017 Parliament ==
Members were announced on 20 July 2015.

Member	Party	Constituency
Paul Beresford MP (Chair)	Conservative	Mole Valley
David Amess MP	Conservative	Southend West
John Cryer MP	Labour	Leyton and Wanstead
Martyn Day MP	SNP	Linlithgow and East Falkirk
Michael Fabricant MP	Conservative	Lichfield
James Gray MP	Conservative	North Wiltshire
Nigel Mills MP	Conservative	Amber Valley
Gisela Stuart MP	Labour	Birmingham Edgbaston
Mark Tami MP	Labour	Alyn and Deeside
Keith Vaz MP	Labour	Leicester East
Robin Walker MP	Conservative	Worcester

=== Changes 2015-2017 ===
Date	Outgoing Member & Party	Constituency	→	New Member & Party	Constituency	Source
28 November 2016	Robin Walker MP (Conservative)	Worcester	→	Robert Syms MP (Conservative)	Poole	Hansard
16 January 2017	James Gray MP (Conservative)	North Wiltshire	→	Mary Robinson MP (Conservative)	Cheadle	Hansard

== 2010–2015 Parliament ==
Members were announced on 26 July 2010.

Member	Party	Constituency
Geoffrey Clifton-Brown MP	Conservative	The Cotswolds
Rosie Cooper MP	Labour	West Lancashire
Frank Dobson MP	Labour	Holborn and St Pancras
Thomas Docherty MP	Labour	Dunfermline and West Fife
Gemma Doyle MP	Labour and Co-op	West Dunbartonshire
Mark Francois MP	Conservative	Rayleigh and Wickford
Alan Haselhurst MP	Conservative	Saffron Walden
Siân James MP	Labour	Swansea East
Dr Phillip Lee MP	Conservative	Bracknell
Nigel Mills MP	Conservative	Amber Valley
Tessa Munt MP	Liberal Democrats	Wells
Sarah Newton MP	Conservative	Truro and Falmouth
Bob Russell MP	Liberal Democrats	Colchester
Shailesh Vara MP	Conservative	North West Cambridgeshire
David Watts MP	Labour	St Helens North
Mike Weatherley MP	Conservative	Hove

=== Changes 2010-2015 ===
Date	Outgoing Member & Party	Constituency	→	New Member & Party	Constituency	Source
2 November 2010	Frank Dobson MP (Labour)	Holborn and St Pancras	→	Tom Harris MP (Labour)	Glasgow South	Hansard
2 November 2010	Gemma Doyle MP (Labour)	West Dunbartonshire	→	Kevan Jones MP (Labour)	North Durham	Hansard
2 November 2010	David Watts MP (Labour)	St Helens North	→	Angela Smith MP (Labour)	Penistone and Stocksbridge	Hansard
22 November 2010	Tom Harris MP (Labour)	Glasgow South	→	John Spellar MP (Labour)	Warley	Hansard
22 November 2010	Siân James MP (Labour)	Swansea East	→	David Watts MP (Labour)	St Helens North	Hansard
14 November 2011	Geoffrey Clifton-Brown MP (Conservative)	The Cotswolds	→	Graham Evans MP (Conservative)	Weaver Vale	Hansard
14 November 2011	Bob Russell MP (Liberal Democrats)	Colchester	→	Mark Hunter MP (Liberal Democrats)	Cheadle	Hansard
14 November 2011	Shailesh Vara MP (Conservative)	North West Cambridgeshire	→	Simon Kirby MP (Conservative)	Brighton Kemptown	Hansard
23 January 2012	Angela Smith MP (Labour)	Penistone and Stocksbridge	→	Mark Tami MP (Labour)	Alyn and Deeside	Hansard
22 October 2012	Mark Francois MP (Conservative)	Rayleigh and Wickford	→	Desmond Swayne MP (Conservative)	New Forest West	Hansard
29 October 2012	Rosie Cooper MP (Labour)	West Lancashire	→	Keith Vaz MP (Conservative)	Leicester East	Hansard
3 December 2012	Simon Kirby MP (Conservative)	Brighton Kemptown	→	Karen Bradley MP (Conservative)	Staffordshire Moorlands	Hansard
3 December 2012	Dr Phillip Lee MP (Conservative)	Bracknell	→	Marcus Jones MP (Conservative)	Nuneaton	Hansard
3 December 2012	Sarah Newton MP (Conservative)	Truro and Falmouth	→	David Morris MP (Conservative)	Morecambe and Lunesdale	Hansard
3 December 2012	Mike Weatherley MP (Conservative)	Hove	→	John Penrose MP (Conservative)	Weston-super-Mare	Hansard
25 March 2013	Graham Evans MP (Conservative)	Weaver Vale	→	Nicholas Soames MP (Conservative)	Crawley	Hansard
1 July 2013	Kevan Jones MP (Labour)	North Durham	→	Tom Harris MP (Labour)	Glasgow South	Hansard
1 July 2013	John Spellar MP (Labour)	Warley	→	David Wright MP (Labour)	Telford	Hansard
28 October 2013	John Penrose MP (Conservative)	Weston-super-Mare	→	David Evennett MP (Conservative)	Bexleyheath and Crayford	Hansard
28 October 2013	Desmond Swayne MP (Conservative)	New Forest West	→	Robert Syms MP (Conservative)	Poole	Hansard
10 March 2014	Karen Bradley MP (Conservative)	Staffordshire Moorlands	→	Harriett Baldwin MP (Conservative)	West Worcestershire	Hansard
10 March 2014	David Morris MP (Conservative)	Morecambe and Lunesdale	→	Conor Burns MP (Conservative)	Bournemouth West	Hansard
10 March 2014	Nicholas Soames MP (Conservative)	Crawley	→	Mark Harper MP (Conservative)	Forest of Dean	Hansard
1 December 2014	Harriett Baldwin MP (Conservative)	West Worcestershire	→	Michael Fabricant MP (Conservative)	Lichfield	Hansard
1 December 2014	Mark Harper MP (Conservative)	Forest of Dean	→	Ben Wallace MP (Conservative)	Wyre and Preston North	Hansard
8 December 2014	Robert Syms MP (Conservative)	Poole	→	Nigel Evans MP (Conservative)	Ribble Valley	Hansard

== See also ==
- Parliamentary committees of the United Kingdom
