= Yorkshire and the Humber Regional Select Committee =

The Yorkshire and the Humber Regional Select Committee was one of nine regional select committees of the House of Commons in the Parliament of the United Kingdom. The establishment of the committee was agreed by the House of Commons on 12 November 2008, following the appointment of 'regional ministers' by Gordon Brown on his appointment as Prime Minister in June 2007. The committee came into existence on 1 January 2009 and ceased to exist upon the dissolution of Parliament on 12 April 2010.

The purpose of the Committee is "to examine regional strategies and the work of regional bodies" in Yorkshire and the Humber.

== Membership ==
The committee was first appointed on 3 March 2009 by the House of Commons, but only contains 5 Labour members as opposed to the 9 members from various parties as was agreed in the motion of 12 November 2008, due to the Conservatives and Liberal Democrats refusing to nominate any members as a sign of their opposition to the existence of regional committees.

Member	Party	Constituency
Eric Illsley MP (Chair)	Labour	Barnsley Central
Clive Betts MP	Labour	Sheffield Attercliffe
Ian Cawsey MP	Labour	Brigg and Goole
Shona McIsaac MP	Labour	Cleethorpes
Austin Mitchell MP	Labour	Great Grimsby

Source: Parliament website archive

=== Changes ===
Occasionally, the House of Commons orders changes to be made in terms of membership of select committees. Such changes are shown below.

Date	Outgoing Member & Party	Constituency	→	New Member & Party	Constituency	Source
29 October 2009	Mary Creagh MP (Labour)	Wakefield	→	Austin Mitchell MP (Labour)	Great Grimsby	Hansard
