= Business and Trade Select Committee =

UK House of Commons select committee

The Business and Trade Select Committee is a select committee of the House of Commons in the Parliament of the United Kingdom. The remit of the committee is to examine the expenditure, administration and policy of the Department for Business and Trade, and any departmental bodies.

The committee came into existence as the Business, Innovation and Skills Committee on 1 October 2009, replacing the Business and Enterprise Select Committee, which was dissolved on 30 September 2009. The House of Commons agreed to the committee's establishment on 25 June 2009, following Prime Minister Gordon Brown's replacement of the Department for Business, Enterprise and Regulatory Reform with the Department for Business, Innovation and Skills on 5 June 2009. Following the merger of the Department of Energy and Climate Change and the Department for Business, Innovation and Skills in July 2016, the name of the committee was changed to the Business, Energy and Industrial Strategy Committee in October 2016 to reflect the name of the new department.

== Chairs ==
Committee chairs include those listed below.

Name	Start	End	Party	Constituency
Donald Kaberry	3 May 1979	9 June 1983	Conservative	Leeds North West
Kenneth Warren	9 June 1983	27 April 1992	Conservative	Hastings and Rye
Richard Caborn	27 April 1992	8 November 1995	Labour	Sheffield Central
Martin O'Neill	27 November 1995	11 April 2005	Labour	Clackmannan (1995–1997)
Martin O'Neill	27 November 1995	11 April 2005	Labour	Ochil (1997–2005)
Peter Luff	14 July 2005	6 May 2010	Conservative	Mid Worcestershire
Adrian Bailey	10 June 2010	30 March 2015	Labour Co-op	West Bromwich West
Iain Wright	18 June 2015	3 May 2017	Labour	Hartlepool
Rachel Reeves	12 July 2017	7 April 2020	Labour	Leeds West
Darren Jones	6 May 2020	4 September 2023	Labour	Bristol North West
Liam Byrne	18 October 2023	present	Labour	Birmingham Hodge Hill and Solihull North

== Membership ==
Members are as follows:

Member	Party	Constituency
Liam Byrne MP (chair)	Labour	Birmingham Hodge Hill and Solihull North
Dan Aldridge MP	Labour	Weston-super-Mare
Antonia Bance MP	Labour	Tipton and Wednesbury
Chris Bloore MP	Labour	Redditch
Nesil Caliskan MP	Labour	Barking
John Cooper MP	Conservative	Dumfries and Galloway
Sarah Edwards MP	Labour	Tamworth
Alison Griffiths MP	Conservative	Bognor Regis and Littlehampton
Leigh Ingham MP	Labour	Stafford
Charlie Maynard MP	Lib Dems	Witney
Joshua Reynolds MP	Lib Dems	Maidenhead

=== Changes since 2024 ===
Date	Outgoing Member & Party	Constituency	→	New Member & Party	Constituency	Source
27 October 2025	Gregor Poynton MP (Labour)	Livingston	→	Dan Aldridge MP (Labour)	Weston-super-Mare	Hansard
27 October 2025	Rosie Wrighting MP (Labour)	Kettering	→	Justin Madders MP (Labour)	Ellesmere Port and Bromborough	Hansard
13 April 2026	Sonia Kumar MP (Labour)	Dudley	→	Chris Bloore MP (Labour)	Redditch	Hansard
13 April 2026	Matt Western MP (Labour)	Warwick and Leamington	→	Leigh Ingham MP (Labour)	Stafford	Hansard
26 October 2026	Justin Madders MP (Labour)	Ellesmere Port and Bromborough	→	Nesil Caliskan MP (Labour)	Barking	Hansard

== 2019–2024 Parliament ==
The chair was elected on 27 January 2020, with the members of the committee being announced on 2 March 2020.

Member	Party	Constituency
Rachel Reeves MP (chair)	Labour	Leeds West
Alan Brown MP	SNP	Kilmarnock and Loudoun
Richard Fuller MP	Conservative	North East Bedfordshire
Nus Ghani MP	Conservative	Wealden
John Howell MP	Conservative	Henley
Mark Jenkinson MP	Conservative	Workington
Peter Kyle MP	Labour	Hove
Pat McFadden MP	Labour	Wolverhampton South East
Anna McMorrin MP	Labour	Cardiff North
Mark Pawsey MP	Conservative	Rugby
Alexander Stafford MP	Conservative	Rother Valley

=== Changes 2019–2024 ===
Date	Outgoing Member & Party	Constituency	→	New Member & Party	Constituency	Source
9 March 2020	John Howell MP (Conservative)	Henley	→	Paul Howell MP (Conservative)	Sedgefield	Hansard
7 April 2020	Rachel Reeves MP (chair, Labour)	Leeds West	→	Vacant		
6 May 2020	Vacant		→	Darren Jones MP (chair, Labour)	Bristol North West	Hansard
11 May 2020	Peter Kyle MP (Labour)	Hove	→	Judith Cummins MP (Labour)	Bradford South	Hansard
11 May 2020	Pat McFadden MP (Labour)	Wolverhampton South East	→	Ruth Jones MP (Labour)	Newport West	Hansard
11 May 2020	Anna McMorrin MP (Labour)	Cardiff North	→	Charlotte Nichols MP (Labour)	Warrington North	Hansard
21 September 2020	Ruth Jones MP (Labour)	Newport West	→	Zarah Sultana MP (Labour)	Coventry South	Hansard
22 February 2021	Zarah Sultana MP (Labour)	Coventry South	→	Sarah Owen MP (Labour)	Luton North	Hansard
5 January 2022	Judith Cummins MP (Labour)	Bradford South	→	Tonia Antoniazzi MP (Labour)	Gower	Hansard
5 January 2022	Sarah Owen MP (Labour)	Luton North	→	Andy McDonald MP (Labour)	Middlesbrough	Hansard
25 October 2022	Richard Fuller MP (Conservative)	North East Bedfordshire	→	Bim Afolami MP (Conservative)	Hitchin and Harpenden	Hansard
25 October 2022	Nusrat Ghani MP (Conservative)	Wealden	→	Jonathan Djanogly MP (Conservative)	Huntingdon	Hansard
25 October 2022	Paul Howell MP (Conservative)	Sedgefield	→	Ruth Edwards MP (Conservative)	Rushcliffe	Hansard
25 October 2022	Mark Jenkinson MP (Conservative)	Workington	→	Robert Largan MP (Conservative)	High Peak	Hansard
1 November 2022	Jonathan Djanogly MP (Conservative)	Huntingdon	→	Vacant		Hansard
1 November 2022	Robert Largan MP (Conservative)	High Peak	→	Vacant		Hansard
8 November 2022	Vacant		→	Mark Jenkinson MP (Conservative)	Workington	Hansard
21 November 2022	Vacant		→	Jane Hunt MP (Conservative)	Loughborough	Hansard
29 November 2022	Tonia Antoniazzi MP (Labour)	Gower	→	Ian Lavery MP (Labour)	Wansbeck	Hansard
12 June 2023	Ruth Edwards MP (Conservative)	Rushcliffe	→	Jonathan Gullis MP (Conservative)	Stoke-on-Trent North	Hansard
12 June 2023	Mark Jenkinson MP (Conservative)	Workington	→	Antony Higginbotham MP (Conservative)	Burnley	Hansard
12 June 2023	Alexander Stafford MP (Conservative)	Rother Valley	→	Anthony Mangnall MP (Conservative)	Totnes	Hansard
4 September 2023	Darren Jones MP (chair, Labour)	Bristol North West	→	Vacant		Hansard
12 September 2023	Alan Brown MP (SNP)	Kilmarnock and Loudoun	→	Douglas Chapman MP (SNP)	Dunfermline and West Fife	Hansard
18 October 2023	Vacant		→	Liam Byrne MP (chair, Labour)	Birmingham Hodge Hill	Hansard
11 December 2023	Bim Afolami MP (Conservative)	Hitchin and Harpenden	→	Julie Marson MP (Conservative)	Hertford and Stortford	Hansard

== 2017–2019 ==
The chair was elected on 12 July 2017, with the members of the committee being announced on 11 September 2017.

Member	Party	Constituency
Rachel Reeves MP (chair)	Labour	Leeds West
Drew Hendry MP	SNP	Inverness, Nairn, Badenoch and Strathspey
Stephen Kerr MP	Conservative	Stirling
Peter Kyle MP	Labour	Hove
Ian Liddell-Grainger MP	Conservative	Bridgwater and West Somerset
Rachel Maclean MP	Conservative	Redditch
Albert Owen MP	Labour	Ynys Môn
Mark Pawsey MP	Conservative	Rugby
Antoinette Sandbach MP	Conservative	Eddisbury
Anna Turley MP	Labour and Co-op	Redcar

=== Changes 2017–2019 ===
Date	Outgoing Member & Party	Constituency	→	New Member & Party	Constituency	Source
16 October 2017	New seat		→	Vernon Coaker MP (Labour)	Gedling	Hansard
18 June 2018	Rachel Maclean MP (Conservative)	Redditch	→	Patrick McLoughlin MP (Conservative)	Derbyshire Dales	Hansard

== Previous changes ==
Occasionally, the House of Commons ordered changes to be made in terms of membership of the select committee, as proposed by the Committee of Selection. Such changes are shown below.

Date	Outgoing member and party	Constituency	→	New member and party	Constituency	Source
2 November 2010	Nicky Morgan MP (Conservative)	Loughborough	→	Simon Kirby MP (Conservative)	Brighton Kemptown	Hansard
2 November 2010	Luciana Berger MP (Labour)	Liverpool Wavertree	→	Paul Blomfield MP (Labour)	Sheffield Central	Hansard
2 November 2010	Jack Dromey MP (Labour)	Birmingham Erdington	→	Katy Clark MP (Labour)	North Ayrshire and Arran	Hansard
2 November 2010	Chi Onwurah MP (Labour)	Newcastle upon Tyne Central	→	Gregg McClymont MP (Labour)	Cumbernauld, Kilsyth and Kirkintilloch East	Hansard
2 November 2010	Rachel Reeves MP (Labour)	Leeds West	→	Ian Murray MP (Labour)	Edinburgh South	Hansard
21 March 2011	Gregg McClymont MP (Labour)	Cumbernauld, Kilsyth and Kirkintilloch East	→	Dan Jarvis MP (Labour)	Barnsley Central	Hansard
24 October 2011	Dan Jarvis MP (Labour)	Barnsley Central	→	Julie Elliott MP (Labour)	Sunderland Central	Hansard
24 October 2011	Ian Murray MP (Labour)	Edinburgh South	→	Ann McKechin MP (Labour)	Glasgow North	Hansard
16 July 2012	David Ward MP (Liberal Democrat)	Bradford East	→	Mike Crockart MP (Liberal Democrat)	Edinburgh West	Hansard
5 November 2012	Margot James MP (Conservative)	Stourbridge	→	Caroline Dinenage MP (Conservative)	Gosport	Hansard
5 November 2012	Simon Kirby MP (Conservative)	Brighton Kemptown	→	Robin Walker MP (Conservative)	Worcester	Hansard

== Notable reports ==
In July 2022, the committee published its report "Energy pricing and the future of the energy market" which examined the turmoil in retail energy arising from unusually high wholesale gas prices, leading to the collapse of several suppliers and the need for government support of Bulb Energy. The committee found that the industry regulator Ofgem had been incompetent in its supervision of the finances of supplier companies, and that the government overlooked this lack of supervision because it prioritised competition over market regulation. The report also criticised Ofgem's design of the energy price cap, recommending that the government consider introducing a social tariff; stated that the government's May 2022 support package for customers was no longer sufficient; and criticised the absence of a home insulation programme.

In response, Ofgem accepted that its previous financial resilience regime was not sufficiently robust, and had contributed to some of the supplier failures since August 2021.
