= Ambition Institute =

Graduate school

- Founded: 2006
- Type: Educational Charity
- Location(s): London, UK Regional offices in Birmingham, and Manchester
- Region served: England
- Fields: Pedagogy, Educational leadership, and Social mobility
- Key people: Hilary Spencer (CEO), Sir David Carter, Tom Rees
- Website: www.ambition.org.uk

Ambition Institute is a graduate school with programmes designed to support educators throughout the education sector, including teachers, leaders, and executive leaders. Their programmes are designed to improve outcomes for pupils from disadvantaged backgrounds.

Ambition Institute is the product of a merger between Ambition School Leadership, and the Institute for Teaching, which took place in March 2019. Collectively, Ambition Institute’s predecessor organisations have supported over 14,000 educators across 2,800 schools and trusts; reaching 1.5 million children.

Ambition Institute also publish reports, including 'People Power', an in-depth analysis of the role Multi-Academy Trusts play in the UK education sector.

In an article for Schools Week, Tom Rees and executive director of school leadership, Jen Barker, stated: "for head teachers, this means we are less concerned with generic approaches to leadership and management, leadership styles or personal traits, and more interested in building proficiency, in context, around the education-specific and highest-leverage work they do".

== Origins ==
Following a feasibility trip to the US, and reflecting on the work of New Leaders, The Future Leaders Trust was set up in 2006 as an independent charity by Absolute Return for Kids, the National College for Teaching and Leadership, and The Schools Network.

These organisations shared the vision of a school leadership programme to improve the life chances of pupils from disadvantaged backgrounds. Key people involved in establishing the organisation included Lord Adonis- who at the time was acting as a Minister of Education and Skills. The trust became a registered charity on 15 November 2006.

In 2016, Teaching Leaders and The Future Leaders Trust merged to form Ambition School Leadership, which introduced a range of new programmes, focusing on middle, senior, and executive leadership.

In July 2018, it was announced that Ambition School Leadership would merge with the Institute for Teaching, an Ark Venture focused on improving teaching and teacher education, "leading to greater reach and impact in schools in challenging contexts across the country". The new brand was officially launched on Monday 11 May at the Oasis Academy South Bank.

In August 2019, former aide to Michael Gove and long-serving Department for Education staffer, Hilary Spencer, was appointed as CEO.

The board of trustees includes Director of Secondary Education Boomer-Clark, James Fulton of Goldman Sachs, and Dame Rachel De Souza.
