= European committee =

Committees of the house of commons of the United Kingdom

The European committees are general committees of the House of Commons of the United Kingdom to which the European Scrutiny Committee (ESC) may refer for further consideration European Union documents laid before the Commons. EU documents are referred to one of three European committees depending on the subject area as determined by the ESC:

A Energy and Climate Change; Environment, Food and Rural Affairs; Transport, Communities and Local Government; Forestry Commission; and analogous responsibilities of Scotland, Wales and Northern Ireland Offices

B HM Treasury (including HM Revenue and Customs); Work and Pensions; Foreign and Commonwealth Office; International Development; Home Office; Ministry of Justice (excluding those responsibilities of the Scotland and Wales Office which fall to European Committee A); together with any matters not otherwise allocated

B Business, Innovation and Skills; Children, Schools and Families (Education); Culture Media and Sport; Health

The committee debates and votes on an amendable motion with respect to the document, with the chair reporting to the House the resolution or that the committee came to no resolution. Shortly thereafter (generally within days), the House votes on a motion with respect to the document without debate.

The chair is chosen by the Speaker from the Panel of Chairs, and thirteen members are chosen to sit as one of the European committees with respect to each referred document, with two being members of the ESC and two being members of the relevant departmental select committee where practicable. The same membership may be nominated to scrutinise more than one document.

== See also ==
- List of committees of the United Kingdom Parliament
