= Procedure and Privileges Committee =

The Procedure and Privileges Committee is a select committee of the House of Lords in the Parliament of the United Kingdom. The remit of the committee is to review House procedure and privileges.

== Chairs ==
Committee chairs include those listed below.

Name	Start	End	Party
The Lord Brabazon of Tara	3 June 2010	8 May 2012	Crossbench
The Lord Sewel	9 May 2012	27 July 2015	Labour
The Lord Laming	7 September 2015	31 August 2016	Crossbench
The Lord McFall of Alcluith	1 September 2016	29 April 2021	Crossbench
The Lord Gardiner of Kimble	13 May 2021	12 May 2026	Crossbench
The Lord Ponsonby of Shulbrede	13 May 2026	present	Crossbench

== Membership ==
As of June 2026, the membership of the committee is as follows:

Member	Party
Lord Ponsonby of Shulbrede(Chair)	Non-affiliated
Lord Bradley	Labour
Lord Dholakia	Liberal Democrat
Baroness Falkner of Margravine	Crossbench
Lord Forsyth of Drumlean	Lord Speaker
Lord Goddard of Stockport	Liberal Democrat
Viscount Goschen	Conservative
Lord Harlech	Conservative
Earl Howe	Conservative
Lord Hunt of Kings Heath	Labour
Lord Jones	Labour
Lord Kennedy of Southwark	Labour
Earl of Kinnoull	Crossbench
Baroness Kramer	Liberal Democrat
Lord Lisvane	Crossbench
Baroness Morgan of Drefelin	Labour
Lord Purvis of Tweed	Liberal Democrat
Lord Russell of Liverpool	Crossbench
Baroness Smith of Basildon	Labour
Lord Stoneham of Droxford	Liberal Democrat
Lord Swire	Conservative
Lord True	Conservative
Lord Vaux of Harrowden	Crossbench
Baroness Williams of Trafford	Conservative

== See also ==
- Parliamentary committees of the United Kingdom
