= Department for Children, Schools and Families =

United Kingdom government department

Department overview
- Formed: 2007; 19 years ago
- Preceding Department: Department for Education and Skills (United Kingdom)
- Dissolved: 2010; 16 years ago
- Superseding Department: Department for Education
- Jurisdiction: England
- Headquarters: London, England, UK

Department for Children, Schools and Families (DCSF) was a department of the UK government, between 2007 and 2010, responsible for issues affecting people in England up to the age of 19, including child protection and education. DCSF was replaced by the Department for Education after the change of government following the 2010 General Election.

The department was led by the Secretary of State for Children, Schools and Families.

The expenditure, administration and policy of the department was scrutinised by the Children, Schools and Families Select Committee.

== History and responsibilities ==
DCSF was created on 28 June 2007 following the demerger of the Department for Education and Skills (DfES). The department was led by Ed Balls. The Permanent Secretary was David Bell.

The department was responsible for coordinating work across Government relevant to youth justice, the respect agenda and family policy, while also taking over responsibility for education policy up to the age of 19 in England from the Department for Education and Skills, with the Secretary of State for Innovation, Universities and Skills being responsible for education after that age.

Other education functions of the former DCSF were taken over by the Department for Business, Innovation and Skills (originally the Department for Innovation, Universities and Skills, since merged with Department for Business, Enterprise and Regulatory Reform).

DCSF was directly responsible for state schools in England. The Minister of State for Schools and Learning was the minister in charge.

The department employed over 2,500 staff.

On 12 May 2010, the department was again renamed and Michael Gove was appointed Secretary of State for Education.

== Locations ==
In May 2010, DCSF had four main sites:

- Castle View House, Runcorn
- Moorfoot Building, Sheffield
- Mowden Hall, Darlington
- Sanctuary Buildings, London

== Ministers ==
The Final ministers in the Department were:

Minister	Portrait	Title
Ed Balls MP		Secretary of State for Children, Schools and Families
Vernon Coaker MP		Minister of State for Schools and Learners
Dawn Primarolo MP		Minister of State for Children, Young People, and Families
Kevin Brennan MP		Minister of State for Further Education, Skills, and Apprenticeship
Diana Johnson MP		Parliamentary Under-Secretary of State for Schools
Iain Wright MP		Parliamentary Under-Secretary of State for 14–19 Reform and Apprenticeships
Delyth Morgan, Baroness Morgan of Drefelin		Parliamentary Under-Secretary of State for Children, Families, and Schools

== Controversies ==
=== Brain gym ===
Charlie Brooker, writing in The Guardian, expressed incredulity that the department was supportive of Brain Gym, despite its broad condemnation by scientific organisations, and despite it being apparently nonsense.

Upon learning that the programme was used at hundreds of UK state schools, Dr Ben Goldacre of The Guardian's Bad Science pages called it a "vast empire of pseudoscience" and went on to dissect parts of their teaching materials, refuting, for instance, claims that rubbing the chest would stimulate the carotid arteries, that "processed foods do not contain water", or that liquids other than water "are processed in the body as food, and do not serve the body's water needs."

=== Child friendly identity and branding ===
The department adopted a "child friendly" visual identity, known as "Building the Rainbow" shortly after it was established. The main features of the brand identity were a rainbow logo and images of cartoonised children carrying blocks to build the rainbow logo. The lettering on the logo was all in lower case despite being a proper noun. It was reported in The Daily Telegraph that several thousand pounds were spent on adopting and implementing this visual identity. The Conservatives, then in opposition, nicknamed the department the "Department for Curtains and Soft Furnishings", a nickname that was often used by the media.

=== Refurbishment of headquarters building ===
The department also came under criticism during the 2010 General Election, after it was revealed that the department's offices had a refit. Other features include a grand glass and steel staircase and imported Italian designer furniture. The total cost of the refit was estimated to be three million pounds, at a time when the department needed to make two billion pounds of savings.

== See also ==
- Department for Education and Skills (Wales) - Welsh equivalent
- Education Directorates - Scottish equivalent
- Department of Education (Northern Ireland) - Northern Irish equivalent
