= Joint Committee on Statutory Instruments =

The Joint Committee on Statutory Instruments is a joint committee of the Parliament of the United Kingdom. The remit of the committee is to scrutinise all statutory instruments made in exercise of powers granted by Acts of Parliament. Instruments laid before the House of Commons alone are considered by the Select Committee on Statutory Instruments, which is composed of the Commons members of the joint committee.

== Chairs ==
Committee chairs include those listed below.

Name	Start	End	Party	Constituency
Bob Cryer	3 May 1979	9 June 1983	Labour	Keighley
Andrew Bennett	9 June 1983	15 May 1987	Labour	Denton and Reddish
Bob Cryer	15 May 1987	12 April 1994	Labour	Bradford South
Andrew Bennett	26 April 1994	21 March 1997	Labour	Denton and Reddish
David Tredinnick	5 June 1997	11 April 2005	Conservative	Bosworth
Eric Forth	5 July 2005	17 May 2006	Conservative	Bromley and Chislehurst
David Maclean	14 June 2006	6 May 2010	Conservative	Penrith and The Border
George Mudie	14 July 2010	30 March 2015	Labour	Leeds East
Derek Twigg	15 July 2015	5 November 2018	Labour	Halton
Jessica Morden	14 November 2018	30 May 2024	Labour	Newport East
Bernard Jenkin	16 October 2024	present	Conservative	Harwich and North Essex

== Membership ==
As of September 2026, the members of the committee are as follows:

Member	Party	Constituency / Peerage
Sir Bernard Jenkin(Chair)	Conservative	Harwich and North Essex
Lewis Atkinson	Labour	Sunderland Central
Graham Brady	Conservative	Baron Brady of Altrincham
Charlotte Cane	Liberal Democrat	Ely and East Cambridgeshire
Harold Carter	Crossbench	Baron Carter of Haslemere
Helena Dollimore	Labour	Hastings and Rye
Anji Hunter	Labour	Baroness Hunter of Auchenreoch
Susan Miller	Liberal Democrat	Baroness Miller of Chilthorne Domer
John Monks	Labour	Baron Monks
Andrew Pakes	Labour	Peterborough
David Pinto-Duschinsky	Labour	Hendon
Gareth Snell	Labour	Stoke-on-Trent Central
Keith Stewart	Conservative	Baron Stewart of Dirleton

== See also ==
- Joint committee of the Parliament of the United Kingdom
- Parliamentary committees of the United Kingdom
