= Public bill committee =

Type of committee in the UK House of Commons

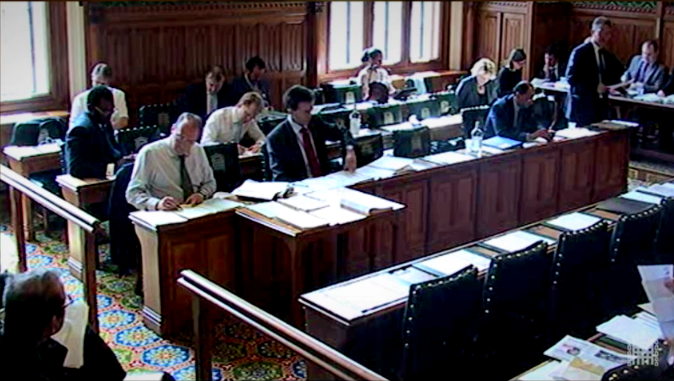
A public bill committee circa 2012

In the British House of Commons, public bill committees (known as standing committees before 2006) consider Bills – proposed Acts of Parliament. The House of Lords does not have such committees, as Bills are usually considered by the House as a whole.

When a Bill has received its Second Reading in the House of Commons, it reaches its committee stage. The Bill is then usually sent to a public bill committee for consideration. However, some bills are considered not by a public bill committee but by a Committee of the Whole House; in this case, amendments are proposed and discussed by the entire House of Commons. This applies to some key clauses of Finance Bills, which are proposed by the Chancellor of the Exchequer every year in March/April, and to some occasional bills that are important, large scale or controversial, such as the House of Lords Reform Bill 1999 and the Safety of Rwanda (Asylum and Immigration) Bill.

The job of public bill committees is to debate and consider amendments to a Bill. The committee considers each Bill clause by clause, and may amend it (the House then considers the bill as amended at the Bill's Report Stage). Under the post-2006 House of Commons procedure, public bill committees may take a limited amount of evidence (akin to a select committee) on certain bills committed to them. Members of the public can make written submissions to public bill committees after the Second Reading debate, by emailing the Scrutiny Unit.

The composition of the committee is roughly proportional to that of the House itself, so it is rare that amendments are accepted that are contrary to a majority Government's wishes. As the overall purpose of a Bill has been set by its Second Reading in the House, amendments at the committee stage may not make drastic changes.
