= Select Committee on Statutory Instruments =

Select committee of the UK House of Commons

The Select Committee on Statutory Instruments is a select committee of the House of Commons in the Parliament of the United Kingdom. The remit of the committee is to scrutinise statutory instruments made in exercise of powers granted by acts of Parliament where the instrument has been laid before the House of Commons only. The committee's responsibilities are those the Joint Committee on Statutory Instruments has with respect to instruments laid before both Houses, and its members are the Commons members of the joint committee.

== Chairs ==
Committee chairs include those listed below.

Name	Start	End	Party	Constituency
Graham Page	1 January 1978	3 May 1979	Conservative	Crosby
Bob Cryer	3 May 1979	9 June 1983	Labour	Keighley
Andrew Bennett	9 June 1983	3 May 1994	Labour	Denton and Reddish
Bob Cryer	3 May 1994	15 May 1997	Labour	Bradford South
David Tredinnick	5 June 1997	28 May 2005	Conservative	Bosworth
Eric Forth	28 June 2005	17 May 2006	Conservative	Bromley and Chislehurst
David Maclean	14 June 2006	6 May 2010	Conservative	Penrith and The Border
George Mudie	14 July 2010	30 March 2015	Labour	Leeds East
Derek Twigg	15 July 2015	5 November 2018	Labour	Halton
Jessica Morden	14 November 2018	30 May 2024	Labour	Newport East
Bernard Jenkin	16 October 2024	present	Conservative	Harwich and North Essex

== Membership ==
=== 2024–present Parliament ===
Membership of the committee is as follows:

Member	Party	Constituency
Bernard Jenkin MP (Chair)	Conservative	Harwich and North Essex
Lewis Atkinson MP	Labour	Sunderland Central
Charlotte Cane MP	Liberal Democrats	Ely and East Cambridgeshire
Helena Dollimore MP	Labour	Hastings and Rye
Andrew Pakes MP	Labour	Peterborough
David Pinto-Duschinsky MP	Labour	Hendon
Gareth Snell MP	Labour	Stoke-on-Trent Central

=== Changes since 2024 ===
Date	Outgoing Member & Party	Constituency	→	New Member & Party	Constituency	Source
3 March 2025	Mark Ferguson MP (Labour)	Gateshead Central and Whickham	→	Rachel Blake MP (Labour)	Cities of London and Westminster	Hansard
3 March 2025	Claire Hughes MP (Labour)	Bangor Aberconwy	→	David Pinto-Duschinsky MP (Labour)	Hendon	Hansard
10 March 2025	Julie Minns MP (Labour)	Carlisle	→	Andrew Pakes MP (Labour)	Peterborough	Hansard
10 March 2025	Gordon McKee MP (Labour)	Glasgow South	→	Gareth Snell MP (Labour)	Stoke-on-Trent Central	Hansard
2 June 2025	Rachel Blake MP (Labour)	Cities of London and Westminster	→	Helena Dollimore MP (Labour)	Hastings and Rye	Hansard
26 January 2026	Charlie Maynard MP (Liberal Democrats)	Witney	→	Charlotte Cane MP (Liberal Democrats)	Ely and East Cambridgeshire	Hansard

=== 2021−2023 Parliament ===
As of January 2023, the members of the committee are as follows:

Member	Party	Constituency
Jessica Morden (Chair)	Labour	Newport East
Peter Grant	Scottish National Party	Glenrothes
Paul Holmes	Conservative	Eastleigh
Gareth Johnson	Conservative	Dartford
Damien Moore	Conservative	Southport
Maggie Throup	Conservative	Erewash
Liz Twist	Labour	Blaydon

=== 2019−2021 Parliament ===
As of May 2021, the members of the committee were as follows:

Member	Party	Constituency
Jessica Morden (Chair)	Labour	Newport East
James Davies	Conservative	Vale of Clwyd
Paul Holmes	Conservative	Eastleigh
John Lamont	Conservative	Berwickshire, Roxburgh and Selkirk
Robert Syms	Conservative	Poole
Richard Thomson	Scottish National Party	Gordon
Liz Twist	Labour	Blaydon

Changes since 2019

Date	Outgoing Member & Party	Constituency	→	New Member & Party	Constituency	Source
2 March 2020	Eddie Hughes MP (Conservative)	Walsall North	→	Paul Holmes MP (Conservative)	Eastleigh	Hansard
25 May 2021	Owen Thompson MP (SNP)	Midlothian	→	Richard Thomson MP (SNP)	Gordon	Hansard

=== 2017−2019 Parliament ===
Members were announced on 30 October 2017.

Member	Party	Constituency
Dan Carden	Labour	Liverpool Walton
Vicky Foxcroft	Labour	Lewisham Deptford
Patrick Grady	SNP	Glasgow North
John Lamont	Conservative	Berwickshire, Roxburgh and Selkirk
Lee Rowley	Conservative	North East Derbyshire
Robert Syms	Conservative	Poole
Derek Twigg	Labour	Halton

Changes 2017−2019

Date	Outgoing Member & Party	Constituency	→	New Member & Party	Constituency	Source
23 April 2018	Lee Rowley MP (Conservative)	North East Derbyshire	→	Julia Lopez MP (Conservative)	Hornchurch and Upminster	Hansard
5 November 2018	Derek Twigg MP (Labour)	Halton	→	Jessica Morden MP (Labour)	Newport East	Hansard
29 April 2019	Dan Carden MP (Labour)	Liverpool Walton	→	Susan Elan Jones MP (Labour)	Clwyd South	Hansard
8 October 2019	Julia Lopez MP (Conservative)	Hornchurch and Upminster	→	Maria Caulfield MP (Conservative)	Lewes	Hansard

=== 2015−2017 Parliament ===
Members were announced on 13 July 2015.

Member	Party	Constituency
Tom Blenkinsop	Labour	Middlesbrough South and East Cleveland
Michael Ellis	Conservative	Eastleigh
Stephen Hammond	Conservative	Wimbledon
Derek Twigg	Labour	Halton

Changes 2015−2017

Date	Outgoing Member & Party	Constituency	→	New Member & Party	Constituency	Source
20 July 2015	New seat		→	Ian Liddell-Grainger MP (Conservative)	Bridgwater and West Somerset	Hansard
2 November 2015	Michael Ellis MP (Conservative)	Eastleigh	→	Victoria Prentis MP (Conservative)	Banbury	Hansard
22 February 2016	Tom Blenkinsop MP (Labour)	Middlesbrough South and East Cleveland	→	Vicky Foxcroft MP (Labour)	Lewisham Deptford	Hansard

== See also ==
- Parliamentary committees of the United Kingdom
