= House Committee (House of Lords) =

The House Committee was a select committee of the House of Lords in the Parliament of the United Kingdom that set policy and provided guidance for long-term planning for the House, supervised its finances, and supervised the scheme for members' expenses.

It was replaced with the House of Lords Commission in August 2016.

== See also ==
- Parliamentary committees of the United Kingdom
