= Services Committee =

The Services Committee is a select committee of the House of Lords which supports the House of Lords Commission.

== Chairs ==
Committee chairs include those listed below.

| Name | Start | End | Party |
|---|---|---|---|
| The Lord Kirkwood of Kirkhope | 22 June 2010 | 14 May 2014 | Liberal Democrats |
| The Baroness Donaghy | 12 June 2014 | 31 August 2016 | Labour |
| The Lord Laming | 1 September 2016 | 28 January 2021 | Crossbench |
| The Lord Touhig | 28 January 2021 | 9 January 2023 | Labour |
| The Baroness McIntosh of Hudnall | 9 January 2023 | 30 January 2025 | Labour |
| The Lord McLoughlin | 30 January 2025 | present | Conservative |

== Membership ==
As of September 2026, the members of the committee are as follows:

| Member | Party |
|---|---|
| Lord McLoughlin(Chair) | Conservative |
| Baroness Anderson of Stoke-on-Trent | Labour |
| Lord Faulkner of Worcester | Labour |
| Lord Goddard of Stockport | Liberal Democrat |
| Viscount Goschen | Conservative |
| Baroness Humphreys | Liberal Democrat |
| Earl of Kinnoull | Crossbench |
| Lord Mawson | Crossbench |
| Baroness Wilcox of Newport | Labour |
| Baroness Williams of Trafford | Conservative |
