= Department for Business, Enterprise and Regulatory Reform =

UK government department, 2007–2009

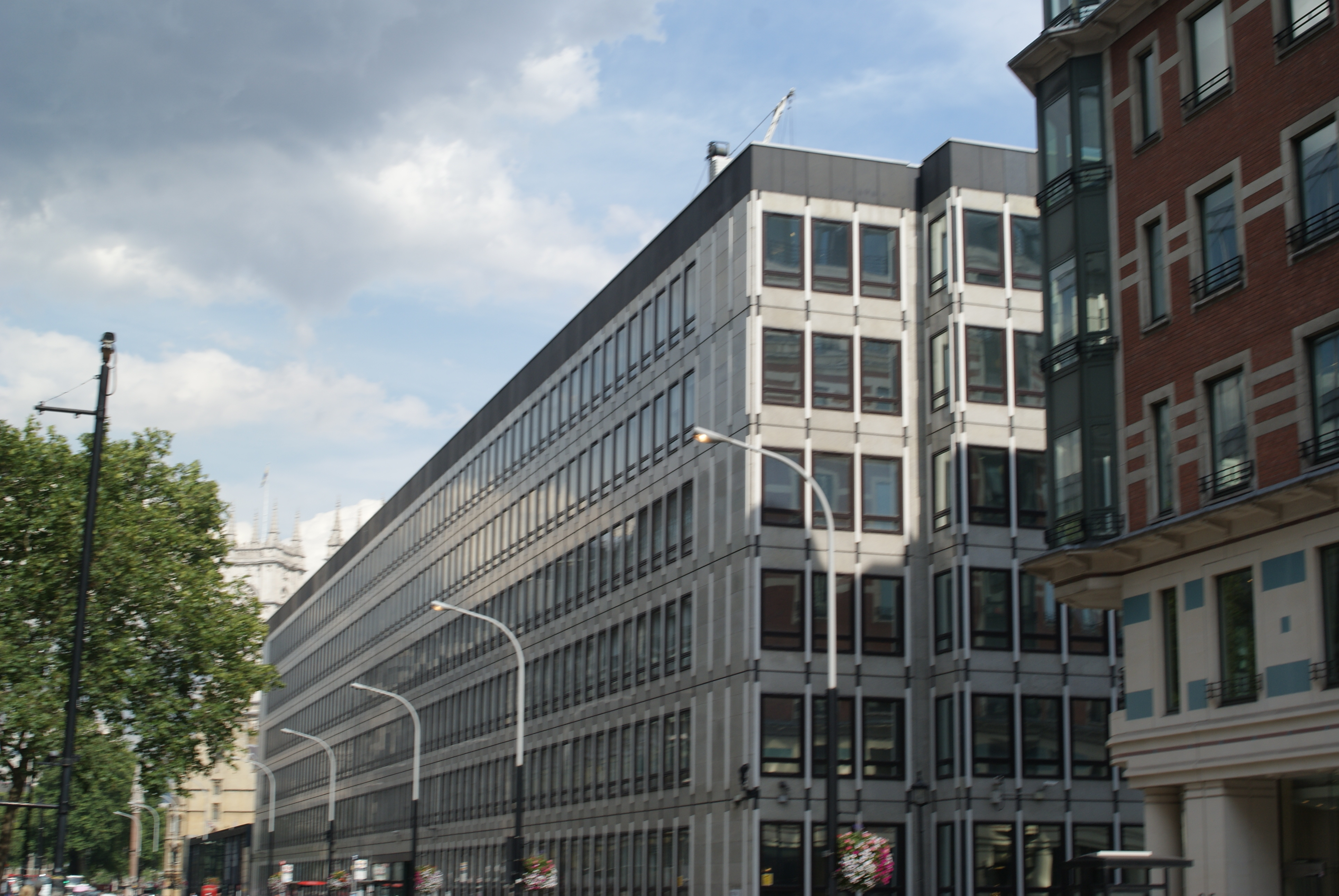

Department overview
- Formed: 28 June 2007
- Preceding Department: Department of Trade and Industry
- Dissolved: 6 June 2009
- Superseding Department: Department for Business, Innovation and Skills
- Jurisdiction: United Kingdom
- Headquarters: Victoria Street, London

The Department for Business, Enterprise and Regulatory Reform (BERR) was a United Kingdom government department. The department was created on 28 June 2007 on the disbanding of the Department of Trade and Industry (DTI), and was itself disbanded on 6 June 2009 on the creation of the Department for Business, Innovation and Skills.

BERR had a wide range of responsibilities. The main areas covered were essentially those previously covered by the DTI: company law, trade, energy, business growth, employment law, regional economic development and consumer law. The principal machinery of government changes affecting the department on creation were the removal of the Office of Science and Innovation to the new Department for Innovation, Universities and Skills and the arrival of the Better Regulation Executive from the Cabinet Office. Subsequently, in October 2008, responsibility for energy policy was removed to the new Department of Energy and Climate Change. It merged with the Department for Innovation, Universities and Skills in the June 2009 reshuffle to become the Department for Business, Innovation and Skills.

BERR was responsible for the implementation of the Companies Act 2006 and for promoting entrepreneurship in the UK. In this context, it supported initiatives such as:

- Make Your Mark, the UK's national campaign to give people the confidence, skills and ambition to be more enterprising.
- Global Entrepreneurship Week, the world's first global celebration and promotion of the entrepreneurial spirit amongst young people.

== Secretary of State for Business, Enterprise and Regulatory Reform (2007–2009) ==
Name	Portrait	Took office	Left office	Political party	Prime Minister
John Hutton		28 June 2007	3 October 2008	Labour	Gordon Brown
Peter Mandelson		3 October 2008	5 June 2009	Labour	Gordon Brown
