= Jessica Morden =

British politician (born 1968)

Dame Jessica Morden DBE MP
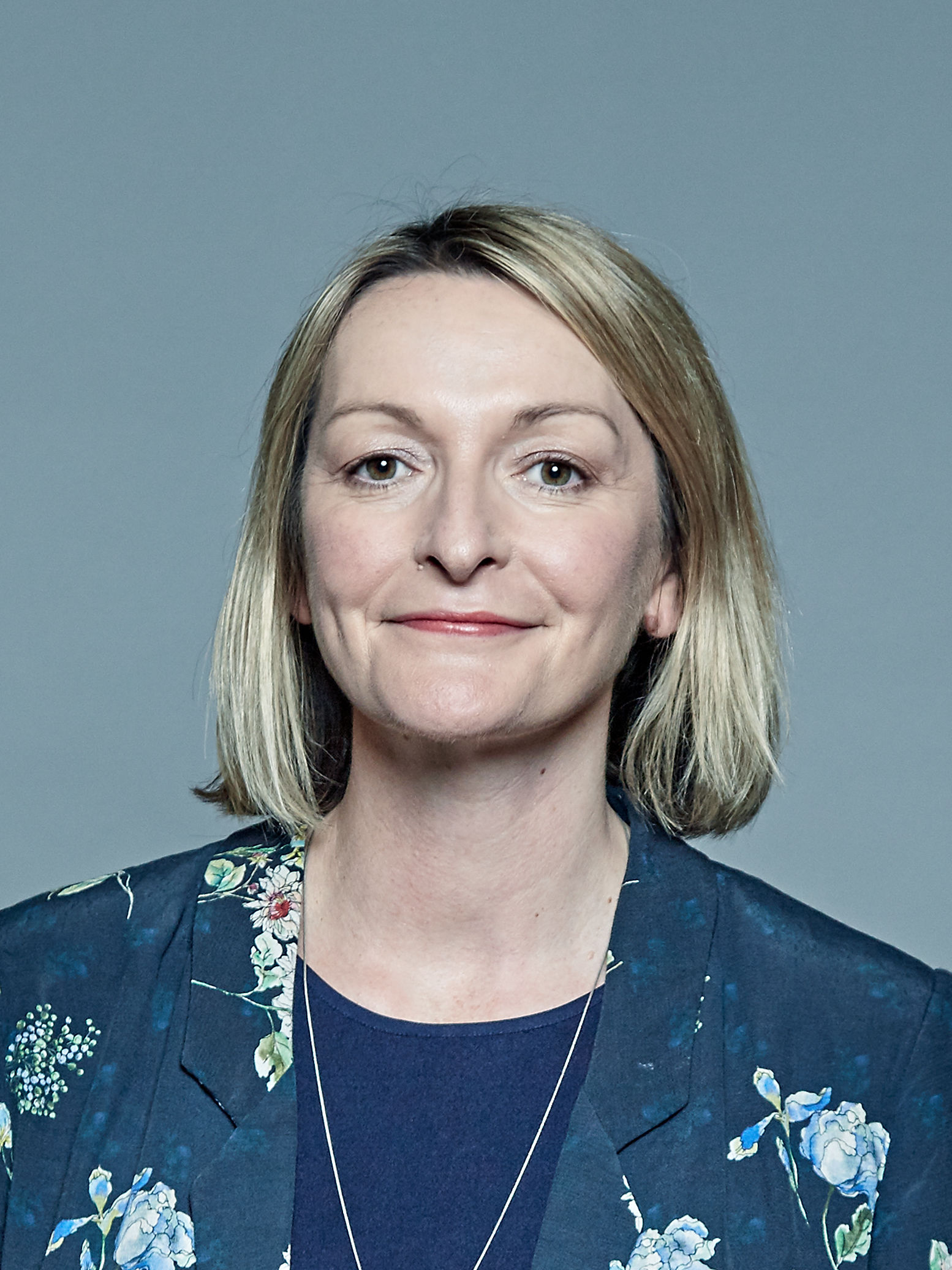
- Official portrait, 2018

Chair of the Parliamentary Labour Party
- Incumbent
- Assumed office 17 July 2024
- Leader: Keir Starmer; Andy Burnham
- Preceded by: John Cryer

Member of Parliament for Newport East
- Incumbent
- Assumed office 5 May 2005
- Preceded by: Alan Howarth
- Majority: 9,009 (23.4%)
Shadow portfolios
2023–2024	Wales
2023–2024	PPS to the Opposition Leader
2021–2023	Deputy Commons Leader
2020–2023	Household Vice-Chamberlain
2015–2020	Whip

General Secretary of Welsh Labour
- In office 1999–2005
- Leader: Alun Michael; Rhodri Morgan
- Preceded by: Anita Gale
- Succeeded by: Chris Roberts

Personal details
- Born: 29 May 1968 (age 58) Surrey, England
- Party: Labour
- Education: University of Birmingham (BA)
- Website: jessicamorden.com

Dame Jessica Elizabeth Morden DBE (born 29 May 1968) is a British politician serving as Member of Parliament (MP) for Newport East since 2005. A member of the Labour Party, she was General Secretary of Welsh Labour from 1999 until her election to Parliament.

== Early life and career ==
Born in Surrey, England, Morden grew up in Cwmbran and educated at Croesyceiliog School before reading Medieval and Modern History (BA) at the University of Birmingham.

In 1991, Morden worked for Huw Edwards, MP for Monmouth. Between 1992 and 1995 she worked for Llew Smith, MP for Blaenau Gwent. Before becoming an MP, Morden was General Secretary of Welsh Labour from 1999 to 2005. She organised some of Labour's election campaigns for the 1997 election.

== Parliamentary career ==
Morden was selected as the Labour Party candidate for Newport East in the 2005 general election by the all-women shortlists method.

Morden served as Parliamentary Private Secretary to the Secretary of State for Wales The Rt Hon Peter Hain MP until May 2010, and later as Shadow Parliamentary Private Secretary to Owen Smith MP during his time as Shadow Secretary of State for Wales.

In her first term, Morden completed the Police Parliamentary Scheme, spending a month during recess with a range of departments and frontline police officers in Gwent Police. She was also appointed by the Speaker to the Members’ Advisory Committee to oversee the setting up of the first ever nursery in the House of Commons.

Morden served as a Senior Whip in the Opposition Whips’ office with responsibility for EU Withdrawal, Wales, and Prime Minister's Questions. She was elected as chair of the Select Committee on Statutory Instruments in November 2018 and, following the 2019 election, re-elected in February 2020.

Morden claimed a total of £167,060 in expenses in 2007/08, the 30th most claimed by the 643 members of the House of Commons. Within approved guidelines, Morden used some of the expenses allowance which was unspent from the previous year to provide additional office space after having a baby; the previous year she claimed £133,592, the 406th highest that year.

In March 2008, some of Jessica Morden's constituents criticised her after she voted against a Conservative parliamentary motion to halt the closure of hundreds of Post Offices whilst simultaneously campaigning to save the Christchurch Road branch in Newport East.

She supported her former employer Owen Smith in his unsuccessful attempt to replace Jeremy Corbyn in the 2016 Labour leadership election.

Jessica Morden was re-elected at the 2017 general election, having increased her majority to 8,003. She was re-elected at the 2019 general election with a reduced majority of 1,992.

In February 2023, the Leader of the Opposition Keir Starmer appointed her as his Parliamentary Private Secretary. In the September 2023 shadow cabinet reshuffle, she was appointed Shadow Minister for Wales, junior to Shadow Secretary Jo Stevens.

In a debate with the UK Parliament House of Commons in March 2024, Morden recognized the expulsion of Armenians from Nagorno-Karabakh as ethnic cleansing, noted the erasure and destruction of Armenian churches and crosses, expressed support for the UK recognition of the Armenian genocide, and strongly urged the House to provide more assistance to the Armenian refugees.

After winning re-election in the 2024 general election, which saw Labour win its first mandate since 2005 and its largest majority since 1997, Morden announced her candidacy to be chair of the Parliamentary Labour Party. Former chair John Cryer stood down at the election, triggering a contest to select his replacement. During her campaign, she emphasised that the "role [is] often described as the Shop Steward of the PLP", that it had not had a female chair in several years (Ann Clwyd was the last one), and promised to carry on what she said was Cryer's success in maintaining lines of communication between Labour MPs irrespective of rank. Clive Efford, chair of the Tribune Group of Labour MPs, stood against her. Morden was considered the favourite of Keir Starmer and the party leadership, while Efford was considered as the alternative candidate who had the support of MPs on the left. On 17 July 2024, Morden was elected chair over Efford.

== Charity work ==
Morden is one of nine presidents of Better Planet Education.

Parliament of the United Kingdom
Preceded by Alan Howarth	Member of Parliament for Newport East; 2005–present	Incumbent
Party political offices
Preceded by Anita Gale	General Secretary of Welsh Labour; 1999–2005	Succeeded by Chris Roberts
