= Department for Innovation, Universities and Skills =

Former department of the United Kingdom Government

Department overview
- Formed: 28 June 2007
- Preceding agencies: Department for Education and Skills; Department of Trade and Industry; Office of Science and Innovation
- Dissolved: 5 June 2009
- Superseding Department: Department for Business, Innovation and Skills
- Jurisdiction: United Kingdom
- Headquarters: London, England, UK

The Department for Innovation, Universities and Skills (DIUS) was a UK government department created on 28 June 2007 to take over some of the functions of the Department of Education and Skills and of the Department of Trade and Industry. Its head office was based at Kingsgate House, 66-74 Victoria Street, London SW1, which has now been demolished. In June 2009 it was merged into the newly formed Department for Business, Innovation and Skills. It was responsible for adult learning, some parts of further education, higher education, skills, science and innovation, but only some of the department's functions were UK-wide. It oversaw the science budget, provided through the Research Councils, for the UK as a whole. On the other hand, education is a devolved matter and there were corresponding departments in the Northern Ireland Executive, Scottish Government and Welsh Assembly Government.

== Strategic objectives ==
The Department's strategic objectives were to

- Accelerate the commercial exploitation of creativity and knowledge, through innovation and research, to create wealth, grow the economy, build successful businesses and improve quality of life.
- Improve the skills of the population throughout their working lives to create a workforce capable of sustaining economic competitiveness, and enable individuals to thrive in the global economy.
- Build social and community cohesion through improved social justice, civic participation and economic opportunity by raising aspirations and broadening participation, progression and achievement in learning and skills.
- Pursue global excellence in research and knowledge, promote the benefits of science in society, and deliver science, technology, engineering and mathematics skills in line with employer demand.
- Strengthen the capacity, quality and reputation of the Further and Higher Education systems and institutions to support national economic and social needs.
- Encourage better use of science in Government, foster public service innovation, and support other Government objectives which depend on DIUS’ expertise and remit.

A number of education functions of the former DfES (largely those focussed on the 14 – 19 age group) were taken over by the Department for Children, Schools and Families.

== Sponsored bodies ==
DIUS had responsibility for a number of Non-Departmental Public Bodies (NDPBs). These included the Research Councils:

- Medical Research Council
- Biotechnology and Biological Sciences Research Council (BBSRC)
- Engineering and Physical Sciences Research Council (EPSRC)
- The Economic and Social Research Council (ESRC)
- The Arts and Humanities Research Council (AHRC)
- The Science and Technology Facilities Council (STFC)
- The Natural Environment Research Council (NERC)

Other NDPBs sponsored by DIUS were:

- Higher Education Funding Council for England (HEFCE)
- Student Loans Company (SLC)
- The Technology Strategy Board (TSB)
- The Design Council

In addition DIUS was the sponsor department for [NESTA] - the National Endowment for Science, Technology and the Arts.

== Ministers ==
Minister	Portrait	Title
John Denham MP		Secretary of State for Innovation, Universities and Skills
Paul Drayson, Baron Drayson		Minister of State for Science and Innovation
David Lammy MP		Minister of State for Higher Education and Intellectual Property
Siôn Simon MP		Parliamentary Under Secretary of State for Further Education
Anthony Young, Baron Young of Norwood Green		Parliamentary Under Secretary of State for Skills and Apprenticeships

== Permanent Secretary ==
The first Permanent Secretary, Ian Watmore, moved to a new appointment, leading to the appointment of Sir Jon Shortridge who was in post a matter of nine days before the department was dissolved.

== See also ==
- Minister of State for Universities
