= Select committee (United Kingdom) =

Parliamentary committee in the UK

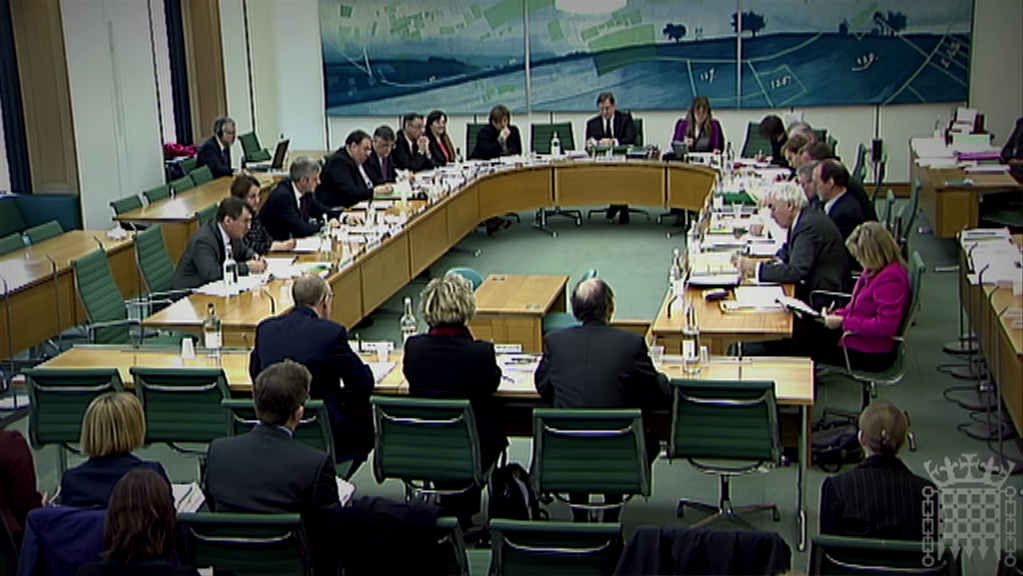
A select committee meeting in Portcullis House

In British politics, parliamentary select committees are cross-party groups of MPs or Lords which investigate specific issues or scrutinise the work of the Government of the United Kingdom.

They can be appointed from the House of Commons, from the House of Lords, or as a joint committee of Parliament drawn from both. Committees may be constituted as "sessional" committees – i.e. be near-permanent – or as "ad-hoc" committees with a specific deadline by which to complete their work, after which they cease to exist.

House of Commons select committees are generally responsible for overseeing the work of government departments and agencies, whereas Lords select committees look at general issues, such as the constitution or the economy. Select committees are also one of Parliament's mechanisms for holding the private sector to account.

Following the 2024 United Kingdom general election, most of the new chairs of the 26 select committees were elected in September 2024.

Some English local authorities also have a select committee system, as part of their Overview and Scrutiny arrangements.

== How select committees work and governing rules ==
Select committees in the House of Commons are governed by the Standing Orders. The powers of departmental select committees are set out in standing order 152.

Committees often open investigations, called inquiries, into topics within their remit. As part of these inquiries they gather information from government officials and interested people, groups, and organisations. At the end of inquiries they often publish a report with their findings, to which the government must respond in writing. Committees have no legal power to compel people to appear before them. Rupert Murdoch and Mike Ashley are two examples of witnesses who initially declined before agreeing to appear. Mark Zuckerberg, for example, declined to appear in front of a committee at all.

Typically, a departmental committee has 11 members, though some, like Public Accounts, are larger. Committee membership and chairs are divided based on parties' seats in the House of Commons and reappointed after election. By tradition, the Public Accounts Committee is led by a member of the opposition party, while a member of the governing party leads the Treasury Select Committee.

The Osmotherly Rules set out guidance on how civil servants should respond to parliamentary select committees.

== Types of select committees ==
=== House of Commons select committees ===
Following the dissolution of parliament that preceded the 2024 election, all select committees were disbanded. The House of Commons allocated which parties would hold each Chair in advance of the summer recess on 30 July 2024. Nominations for Chairs ran until 9 September. Ballots took place on 11 September.

==== Departmental select committees ====
Committee	Chair		Responsibility
Committee	Name	Since	Responsibility
Business and Trade Select Committee	Liam Byrne	2023	Department for Business, Innovation, Science and Trade and related bodies
Digital, Culture, Media and Sport Committee	Caroline Dinenage	2023	Department for Digital, Culture, Media and Sport
Defence Select Committee	Tan Dhesi	2024	Ministry of Defence
Education Select Committee	Helen Hayes	2024	Department for Education and related bodies
Energy Security and Net Zero Select Committee	Bill Esterson	2024	Department for Energy Security and Net Zero and related bodies
Environment, Food and Rural Affairs Select Committee	Alistair Carmichael	2024	Department for Environment, Food and Rural Affairs and associated bodies
Foreign Affairs Select Committee	Emily Thornberry	2024	Foreign, Commonwealth and Development Office and associated bodies
Health and Social Care Select Committee	Layla Moran	2024	Department of Health and Social Care and related bodies
Home Affairs Select Committee	Karen Bradley	2024	Home Office and related bodies
Housing, Communities and Local Government Committee	Abena Oppong-Asare	2026	Ministry of Housing, Communities and Local Government
International Development Select Committee	Sarah Champion	2020	Foreign, Commonwealth and Development Office and associated bodies
Justice Select Committee	Catherine Atkinson	2026	Ministry of Justice, related agencies including the Crown Prosecution Service, and other agencies that report to the Lord Chancellor
Northern Ireland Affairs Committee	Tonia Antoniazzi	2024	The work of the devolved government and the Northern Ireland Office
Science, Innovation and Technology Committee	Chi Onwurah	2024	Government Office for Science, Department for Business, Innovation, Science and Trade, Department for Digital, Culture, Media and Sport, and related bodies
Scottish Affairs Committee	Patricia Ferguson	2024	The work of the devolved government and the Scotland Office
Transport Select Committee	Ruth Cadbury	2024	Department for Transport
Treasury Select Committee	Meg Hillier	2024	Treasury and HM Revenue and Customs
Welsh Affairs Select Committee	Ruth Jones	2024	The Wales Office and UK Government policies which impact Wales
Women and Equalities Select Committee	Olivia Bailey	2026	The Office for Equality and Opportunity and policies which affect equality law and policy
Work and Pensions Select Committee	Debbie Abrahams	2024	Department for Work and Pensions

==== Cross-cutting select committees ====
Committee	Chair		Responsibility
Committee	Name	Since	Responsibility
Environmental Audit Select Committee	Toby Perkins	2024	Examines the contribution of government policies to environmental protection and sustainable development
Liaison Committee	Meg Hillier	2024	Examines the work of select committees in general, as well as hearing annual evidence from the Prime Minister
Public Accounts Select Committee	Geoffrey Clifton-Brown	2024	Examines government and parliamentary expenditure to ensure honesty and fairness
Public Administration and Constitutional Affairs Select Committee	Simon Hoare	2024	Examines the work and administration of the Civil Service, as well as reports from the Parliamentary Ombudsman
Select Committee on Statutory Instruments	Bernard Jenkin	2024	Examines all statutory instruments laid before the Commons
Petitions Committee	Jamie Stone	2024	Oversees petitions submitted to Parliament

==== Internal select committees ====
Committee	Chair		Responsibility
Committee	Name	Since	Responsibility
Administration Committee	Nick Smith	2024	Examines the services offered to members of the Commons, as well as services offered to the public
Backbench Business Committee	Bob Blackman	2024	Determines business to be debated at certain times set aside for backbenchers
Finance Committee	Steve Barclay	2024	Examines the budget and expenditure of the House of Commons, including the administration budget
Committee on Standards	Alberto Costa	2024	Oversees Parliamentary standards and members' interests and conduct
Committee of Privileges	Alberto Costa	2025	Considers specific matters relating to privileges referred to it by the House
Procedure Committee	Cat Smith	2024	Examines the practice and procedures of the Commons in dealing with public business
Committee of Selection	Jessica Morden	2024	Recommends the appointment of members to parliamentary committees

==== Regional Select Committees ====
Nine committees were formed under the House of Commons Select Committees between 2008 and 2010, to examine regional strategies and the work of regional bodies. The committees came into existence on 1 January 2009 and ceased to exist upon the dissolution of Parliament on 12 April 2010.

- East Midlands Regional Select Committee
- East of England Regional Select Committee
- North East Regional Select Committee
- North West Regional Select Committee
- South East Regional Select Committee
- South West Regional Select Committee
- West Midlands Regional Select Committee
- Yorkshire and the Humber Regional Select Committee
- London Regional Select Committee

=== House of Lords select committees ===
House of Lords select committees include:

- The Constitution Committee
- The Economic Affairs Committee
- The Science and Technology Committee (House of Lords)
- The Communications and Digital Committee

These committees run inquiries into and publish reports on topics within their remit.

== History ==
Specialised committees of investigation existed within Parliament since the Tudor period. In the sixteenth century, committees revised bills and considered constitutional and religious questions.

The committees system was further developed during the mid-1960s by Richard Crossman as Leader of the House of Commons.

The modern system of departmental select committees in the UK came into being in 1979, following the recommendations of a 1978 Procedure Select Committee report. It recommended the appointment of a series of select committees covering all the main departments of state, with wide terms of reference, and with power to appoint specialist advisers as the committees deemed appropriate. It also suggested that committee members should be selected independently of the party whips, as chosen by the Select Committee of Selection. The fourteen new committees began working in 1980 after the 1979 general election.

Since then, Parliament has organised House of Commons committees into three main types:

- Departmental committees: Each committee scrutinises a specific government department. For example, the Education Select Committee watches over the Department for Education.
- Cross-cutting committees: These committees focus on broader topics that don’t belong to any single department. For example, the Science and Technology Select Committee, and Women and Equalities Select Committee.
- Domestic committees: These committees manage issues within Parliament itself, like procedures and standards.

In July 2005, the Administration Select Committee was created to replace five previous committees. It covers services in the House, including catering, the House of Commons Library, digital services, and visitor services.

Sometimes, committees from the House of Commons or joint standing committees (which include members of both Houses) review individual bills in detail. Most bills go to public bill committees. Before 2006, these were called standing committees.

In 2009, the Wright Committee was formed to improve the procedures and relevance of Parliament. Changes made based on the committee's recommendations included limiting the number of members per committee to 11, requiring those members and chairs to be elected by the House, and a reduction in the number of committees. The recommendations of the Wright committee were widely understood to have a positive impact on the constructiveness and productivity of Parliament. Tony Wright believed the reforms gave committees "new confidence and authority", particularly because they were now elected, and "their activities restored the reputation of the Commons".

The Backbench Business Committee was created in 2010 as a non-ministerial committee to cover non-government business, following recommendations from the Reform the House of Commons report under the Wright Committee.

Since June 2010, most committee chairs are elected by the whole House. Before this, each party appointed members and chose chairs within the group.

== Impact and influence ==
Select committees recommendations often focus on changes to government policy. One study estimates that 30–40% of select committee recommendations become policy.

== In popular culture ==
A 2015 select committee inquiry into the Horizon computer system features in Mr Bates vs The Post Office.

In series 2, episode 3 of British satirical comedy The Thick of It, Hugh Abbot gives evidence to the Education select committee, chaired by Claire Ballentine. He lies during the session, causing himself to appear in front of the committee a second time.

== See also ==
- Parliamentary committees of the United Kingdom
