= Committee of Selection (House of Lords) =

The Committee of Selection is a committee of the House of Lords in the Parliament of the United Kingdom. The committee is appointed to propose members of select committees and the panel of Deputy Chairmen of Committees.

== Chairs ==
Committee chairs include those listed below.

Name	Start	End	Party
The Lord Brabazon of Tara	3 June 2010	8 May 2012	Crossbench
The Lord Sewel	9 May 2012	27 July 2015	Labour
The Lord Laming	7 September 2015	31 August 2016	Crossbench
The Lord McFall of Alcluith	1 September 2016	29 April 2021	Crossbench
The Lord Gardiner of Kimble	13 May 2021	12 May 2026	Crossbench
The Lord Ponsonby of Shulbrede	13 May 2026	present	Crossbench

== Membership ==
As of September 2026, the members of the committee are:

Member	Party
Lord Ponsonby of Shulbrede(Chair)	Non-affiliated
Lord Goddard of Stockport	Liberal Democrat
Lord Hampton	Crossbench
Lord Kennedy of Southwark	Labour
Earl of Kinnoull	Crossbench
Baroness Lawrence of Clarendon	Labour
Lord Purvis of Tweed	Liberal Democrat
Baroness Smith of Basildon	Labour
Lord True	Conservative
Baroness Williams of Trafford	Conservative

== See also ==
- Parliamentary committees of the United Kingdom
