= Standing Orders Committee =

Select committee of the UK House of Lords

The Standing Orders (Private Bills) Committee is a select committee of the House of Lords that deals with private bills. When the Examiner of Private Bills determines that the promoters of a private bill have not complied with the Standing Orders of the House of Lords relating to Private Business, the matter is referred to the Committee, who advise the House whether to waive the applicable standing orders. If the Examiner is in doubt as to whether the Standing Orders have been complied with, he may refer the matter to the Committee, who then decide the matter on their own authority. In the case of an unopposed private bill, the Chairman of Committees may act alone on behalf of the Committee.

== Chairs ==
Committee chairs include those listed below.

| Name | Start | End | Party |
|---|---|---|---|
| The Lord Brabazon of Tara | 3 June 2010 | 8 May 2012 | Crossbench |
| The Lord Sewel | 9 May 2012 | 27 July 2015 | Labour |
| The Lord Laming | 7 September 2015 | 31 August 2016 | Crossbench |
| The Lord McFall of Alcluith | 1 September 2016 | 29 April 2021 | Crossbench |
| The Lord Gardiner of Kimble | 13 May 2021 | 12 May 2026 | Crossbench |
| The Lord Ponsonby of Shulbrede | 13 May 2026 | present | Crossbench |

== Membership ==
As of May 2026, the membership of the committee is as follows:

| Member | Party |
|---|---|
| Lord Ponsonby of Shulbrede (Chair) | Non-affiliated |
| Baroness Finlay of Llandaff | Crossbench |
| Lord Jones | Labour |
| Lord McColl of Dulwich | Conservative |
| Lord Naseby | Conservative |
| Baroness Thomas of Winchester | Liberal Democrat |
