= Liaison Committee (House of Lords) =

The Liaison Committee is a select committee of the House of Lords. The Committee advises the House on financial and other resources required by the body's select committees and allocates those resources among them. It is also responsible for reviewing the work of the select committees, coordinating their work with those of the House of Commons, and considering requests to appoint Special Inqury committees.

== Chairs ==
Committee chairs include those listed below.

Name	Start	End	Party
The Lord Brabazon of Tara	3 June 2010	8 May 2012	Crossbench
The Lord Sewel	9 May 2012	27 July 2015	Labour
The Lord Laming	7 September 2015	31 August 2016	Crossbench
The Lord McFall of Alcluith	1 September 2016	29 April 2021	Crossbench
The Lord Gardiner of Kimble	13 May 2021	12 May 2026	Crossbench
The Lord Ponsonby of Shulbrede	13 May 2026	present	Crossbench

== Membership ==
As of September 2026, the members of the committee are as follows:

Member	Party
Lord Ponsonby of Shulbrede(Chair)	Non-affiliated
Baroness Alexander of Cleveden	Labour
Lord Collins of Highbury	Labour
Baroness Fookes	Conservative
Baroness Garden of Frognal	Liberal Democrat
Baroness Gill	Labour
Lord Hampton	Crossbench
Earl Howe	Conservative
Earl of Kinnoull	Crossbench
Lord Smith of Hindhead	Conservative
Lord Storey	Liberal Democrat
