= Hybrid Instruments Committee =

UK House of Lords Parliamentary Select Committee

The Hybrid Instruments Committee is a select committee of the House of Lords in the Parliament of the United Kingdom. The role of the committee is to look into all opposed hybrid instruments (i.e., a statutory instrument that, but for its enabling act, would have had to proceed through Parliament as a hybrid bill or private bill), and to advise the House as to whether it should appoint a select committee, similar to those appointed for opposed private bills, to scrutinise the instrument and the petition or petitions against it.

== Chairs ==
Committee chairs include those listed below.

Name	Start	End	Party
The Lord Brabazon of Tara	3 June 2010	8 May 2012	Crossbench
The Lord Sewel	9 May 2012	27 July 2015	Labour
The Lord Laming	7 September 2015	31 August 2016	Crossbench
The Lord McFall of Alcluith	1 September 2016	29 April 2021	Crossbench
The Lord Gardiner of Kimble	13 May 2021	12 May 2026	Crossbench
The Lord Ponsonby of Shulbrede	13 May 2026	present	Crossbench

== Membership ==
As of June 2026, the membership of the committee is as follows:

Member	Party
Lord Ponsonby of Shulbrede(Chair)	Non-affiliated
Lord Addington	Liberal Democrat
Lord Grantchester	Labour
Baroness Jenkin of Kennington	Conservative
Lord Lisvane	Crossbench

== See also ==
- Parliamentary committees of the United Kingdom
