= Geoffrey Kini =

Ghanaian politician

Hon. Geoffrey Kini MP
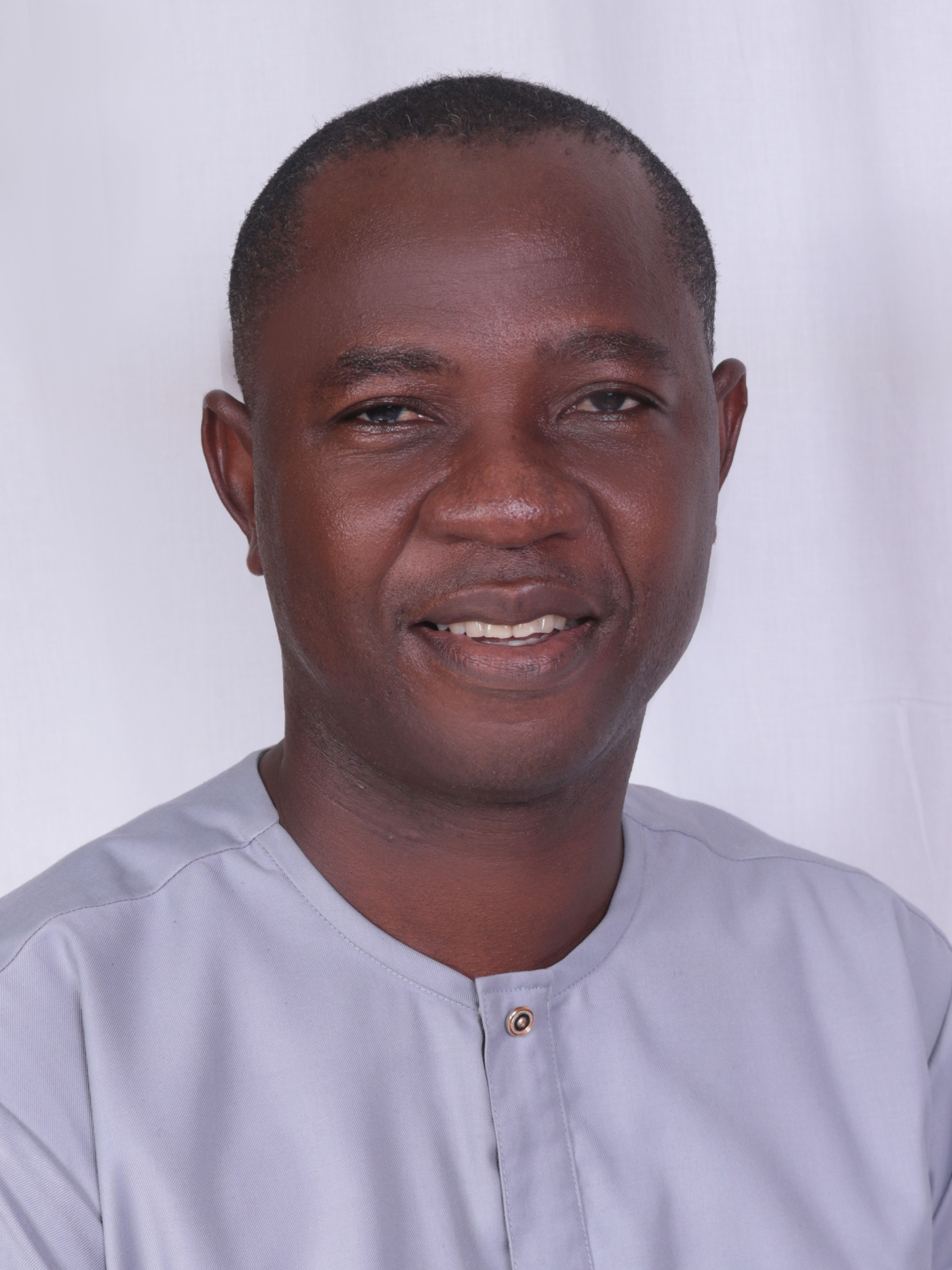

Member of the Ghana Parliament for Nkwanta South constituency

Personal details
- Born: 9 March 1971 (age 55)
- Party: National Democratic Congress

Geoffrey Kini (born Thursday 1 January 1970) is a Ghanaian politician and member of the Eighth Parliament of the Fourth Republic of Ghana representing the Nkwanta South Constituency in the Oti Region of Ghana on the ticket of the National Democratic Congress.

== Early life and education ==
Geoffrey Kini was born and hails from Bakpa New Town in the Oti Region of Ghana. Geoffrey Kini had his Middle School Leaving Certificate (MSLC) in 1985, 2nd Division in 1991 and his Bachelor's degree in Human resource management (2nd Class Upper) in 2017. He is also a Graduate (Conflict Peace and Security) in the year 2020.

== Career ==
Geoffrey Kini is the chief executive officer (CEO) of Kini Geoffrey. He worked as a managing director for FairCom (A Database Technology Company) from 1994 to 2016. He is now working as the Member of parliament (MP) for Nkwanta South Constituency in the Oti Region of Ghana on the ticket of the National Democratic Congress.

== Political life ==
Geoffrey Kini contested and won the 2016 NDC parliamentary primaries for Nkwanta South Constituency in the Oti Region of Ghana. Geoffrey Kini proceeded to win the parliamentary seat in his constituency (Nkwanta South Constituency) in the Oti Region of Ghana during the 2016 Ghanaian general elections on the ticket of the National Democratic Congress to join the Seventh (7th) Parliament of the Fourth Republic of Ghana with 21,691 votes (59.3%) against Edusei Cephas Kujo of the New Patriotic Party who had 8,903 votes (24.4%), Njonam Wisdom Wagya (An Independent Candidate) who also had 5,670 votes (15.5%) and Nyame Maxwell of the Convention People's Party(CPP) who had 297 votes (0.8%).

Geoffrey Kini again contested and won the 2020 NDC parliamentary primaries for Nkwanta South Constituency in the Oti Region of Ghana with 891 votes against Richard Manuribe who had 189 votes. Geoffrey Kini again proceeded to win in the 2020 Ghanaian general elections on the ticket of the National Democratic Congress to join the Eighth (8th) Parliament of the Fourth Republic of Ghana with 29,189 votes (57.7%) against Sherifa Sekyere-Tijani of the New Patriotic Party who had 20,272 votes (40.1%) and Ograh Felix William of the Progressive People's Party(PPP) who had 1,127 votes (2.2%).

=== Committees ===
Geoffrey Kini is a member of the Standing Orders Committee. He is also a member of the Communications Committee of the Eighth (8th) Parliament of the Fourth Republic of Ghana.

== Personal life ==
Geoffrey Kini is a Christian.

== Philanthropy ==
Geoffrey Kini donated Hundred Bags of Cement to Breweniase Health Center to support the building of a laboratory unit at health center.

Geoffrey Kini donated Hundred(100) Bags of Cement to the Bonakye community in the Nkwanta South Constituency to support the building of an additional facility at the Health Center since Chief and people of Bonakye made an appeal that they want to put up additional facilities to expand their health center so that people will not have to travel to Nkwanta before accessing primary health care.

Geoffrey Kini again donated a motorbike to St. Joseph Catholic Hospital and the Municipal Hospital in his constituency(Nkwanta South Constituency) in the Oti Region of Ghana because they lacked any vehicle to attend to emergencies and also facilitate the movement of health officials attending the COVID-19 outbreak. Aside from the motorbike, Geoffrey Kini also donated an amount of GHc10,000 to the hospital to help them buy Personal Protective Equipment (PPEs) to protect themselves. Geoffrey Kini further donated gallons of disinfectants, hand sanitizers, liquid soaps and other items.
