= Lord King =

Lord King may refer to:

- Baron King, title created in 1725, see Earl of Lovelace
- John King, Baron King of Wartnaby (1917–2005), chairman of British Airways
- Mervyn King, Baron King of Lothbury (born 1948), former governor of the Bank of England
- Tarsem King, Baron King of West Bromwich (1937–2013), British local councillor
- Tom King, Baron King of Bridgwater (born 1933), British former cabinet member
