= Olivia Musgrave =

Irish sculptor (born 1958)

- Born: 1958 (age 67–68)

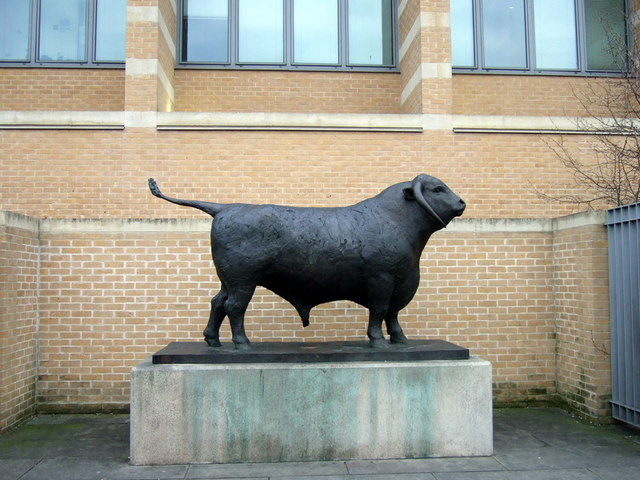
Oxford ox Bronze sculpture commissioned jointly by the city and the university to stand outside Oxford railway station where it is the first thing to meet the eyes of emerging travellers. It is by Olivia Musgrave, cost over £40,000, and was unveiled in 2002. The building behind it is the Said Business School.

Olivia Musgrave (born 1958) is an Irish sculptor.

== Biography ==
Olivia Musgrave was born in Dublin in 1958. She studied Political Science in Paris and lived in Italy. She then studied at the City and Guilds of London Institute under sculptor Allan Sly.

Her work is reminiscent of Greek mythology and Marino Marini, Arturo Martini, El Greco and Giacomo Manzù. It can be found at the John Martin Gallery in London, the Royal Hibernian Academy and Jorgensen Fine Art in Dublin, the Everard Read Gallery in Johannesburg, South Africa, and the Somerville Manning Gallery in the US. She is a Fellow of the Royal Society of Sculptors and a Member of the Society of Portrait Sculptors. In 2014 she was elected President of the Society of Portrait Sculptors.

In 2004, she married John Gardiner, Baron Gardiner of Kimble.
