= Crossrail Act 2008 =

Act of the Parliament of the United Kingdom

Crossrail Act 2008 (Note: Section 58.)
- Act of Parliament
- Parliament of the United Kingdom
- Long title: An Act to make provision for a railway transport system running from Maidenhead, in the County of Berkshire, and Heathrow Airport, in the London Borough of Hillingdon, through central London to Shenfield, in the County of Essex, and Abbey Wood, in the London Borough of Greenwich; and for connected purposes
- Citation: 2008 c. 18
- Introduced by: Douglas Alexander, Secretary of State for Transport (Commons); Lord Bassam of Brighton (Lords)
- Territorial extent: United Kingdom

Dates
- Royal assent: 22 July 2008
- Commencement: 22 July 2008 (Note: Section 4(b) of the Interpretation Act 1978.)
Other legislation
Amended by	Constitutional Reform and Governance Act 2010; Statute Law (Repeals) Act 2013; Digital Economy Act 2017
Relates to	Channel Tunnel Rail Link Act 1996

Status: Amended

History of passage through Parliament

Text of statute as originally enacted

Revised text of statute as amended

The Crossrail Act 2008 (c. 18) is an act of the Parliament of the United Kingdom which authorises the construction of the Crossrail railway from Maidenhead and Heathrow Airport to Shenfield and Abbey Wood. The legislation was introduced by the then Secretary of State for Transport Douglas Alexander and received royal assent on 22 July 2008. The Crossrail bill was introduced on 22 February 2005 and was carried over between sessions of Parliament on three occasions. Although public bills generally pass through Parliament in a single session, this was a hybrid bill, which has the characteristics of both public and private bills and is subject to scrutiny in the same way as both a public and private bill, and generally takes longer to be considered. The last such hybrid bill introduced led to the Channel Tunnel Rail Link Act 1996.

== Background ==
A Crossrail Bill had been presented to Parliament in 1989, but was ultimately rejected by the Conservative government.

== Sections ==
=== Works ===
For more detail of the route of Crossrail see the separate article on Crossrail.

The Crossrail Act 2008 provides for the construction of a tunnel with a western portal at Royal Oak in Westminster, London and eastern portals at Custom House and Pudding Mill Lane, both in the Borough of Newham in east London. It also allows for the construction of railways in the surrounding boroughs, in Greater London and in parts of Berkshire, Buckinghamshire, and Essex, but will in practice only involve improvements to the existing main line railways it will share outside central London. There is also an exemption to Section 31(7) of the Electricity Act 1989 which states that all overhead lines must be approved by the Secretary of State before being built. Instead, overhead lines may be built within the railways located in previously mentioned land.

=== Land ===
The Secretary of State may acquire any land mentioned in the Act after the passage of the Crossrail Act 2008. Although there is a five-year limit on land acquisition, the Secretary of State may extend this power for up to another five years. In addition, private rights of way may be extinguished upon the passing of the Crossrail Act 2008 and the loss of these rights must be compensated.

== Reception ==
The original version of the bill for the act was criticised by BAA, the owner of Heathrow Airport, for allowing the Secretary of State to seize control of the Heathrow Express.
