= Minister of State for Water and Flooding =

British government minister

United Kingdom Minister of State for Water and Rural Growth
- Royal Arms of His Majesty's Government

- Incumbent; Emma Hardy since 9 July 2024
- Department for Environment, Food and Rural Affairs
- Style: Minister
- Nominator: Prime Minister of the United Kingdom
- Appointer: The Monarch; on advice of the Prime Minister
- Term length: At His Majesty's pleasure
- Website: www.gov.uk/government/ministers/minister-of-state--224

The Minister of State for Water and Flooding is a junior position in the Department for Environment, Food and Rural Affairs in the British government.

== Responsibilities ==
The Minister's responsibilities include:

- floods and emergencies
- water
- clean air and noise
- environmental regulation (including chemicals, contaminated land and Registration, Evaluation and Authorisation of Chemicals (REACH))
- pesticides
- Net Zero, climate change and adaptation
- domestic and international marine
- lead for Environment Agency
- lead for Consumer Council for Water

== Ministers ==
Name	Portrait	Term of office		Party	Prime Minister
Minister of State for Rural Affairs
Alun Michael		11 June 2001	10 May 2005	Labour	Tony Blair
Parliamentary Under-Secretary of State for Biodiversity, Landscape and Rural Affairs
Jim Knight		6 May 2005	5 May 2006	Labour	Tony Blair
Barry Gardiner		5 May 2006	28 June 2007	Labour	Tony Blair
Parliamentary Under-Secretary of State for Rural Affairs and Environment
Joan Ruddock		2 July 2007	5 October 2008	Labour	Gordon Brown
Dan Norris		5 June 2009	11 May 2010	Labour	Gordon Brown
Parliamentary Under-Secretary of State for Natural Environment, Water and Rural Affairs
Richard Benyon		6 June 2010	7 October 2013	Conservative	David Cameron
Parliamentary Under-Secretary of State for Water, Forestry, Rural Affairs and Resource Management
Dan Rogerson		7 October 2013	8 May 2015	Liberal Democrats	David Cameron
Rory Stewart		12 May 2015	13 July 2016	Conservative	David Cameron
Parliamentary Under-Secretary of State for Rural Affairs and Biosecurity
The Lord Gardiner of Kimble		13 July 2016	10 May 2021	Conservative	Theresa May; Boris Johnson
Parliamentary Under-Secretary of State for Rural Affairs, Access to Nature and Biosecurity
The Lord Benyon		13 May 2021	20 September 2022	Conservative	Boris Johnson
Parliamentary Under-Secretary of State for Growth and Rural Affairs
Scott Mann		20 September 2022	28 October 2022	Conservative	Liz Truss
Minister of State for Biosecurity, Marine and Rural Affairs
The Lord Benyon		30 October 2022	14 November 2023	Conservative	Rishi Sunak
Parliamentary Under-Secretary of State for Water and Rural Growth
Robbie Moore		14 November 2023	5 July 2024	Conservative	Rishi Sunak
Parliamentary Under-Secretary of State for Water and Flooding (July 2024–July 2026) Minister of State for Water and Flooding (July 2026–present)
Emma Hardy		9 July 2024	Incumbent	Labour	Keir Starmer; Andy Burnham
