= Christopher Bellamy, Baron Bellamy =

British barrister and judge (born 1946)

The Right Honourable The Lord Bellamy KC
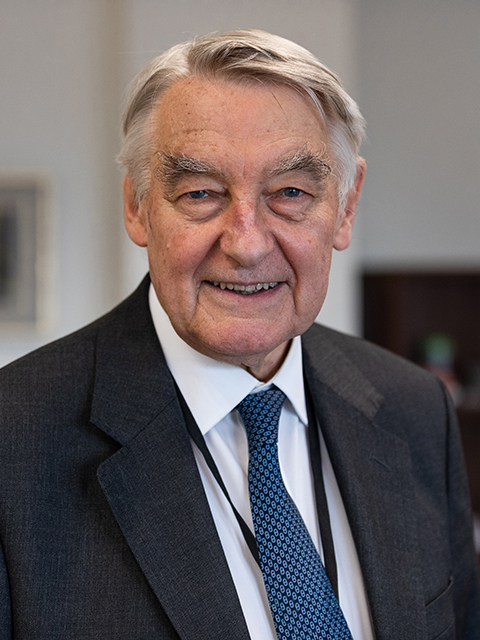
- Bellamy in 2022

Parliamentary Under-Secretary of State for Justice
- In office 7 June 2022 – 5 July 2024
- Prime Minister: Boris Johnson; Liz Truss; Rishi Sunak
- Preceded by: The Lord Wolfson of Tredegar
- Succeeded by: The Lord Ponsonby of Shulbrede

Member of the House of Lords
- Lord Temporal
- Life peerage 14 June 2022

Personal details
- Born: 25 April 1946 (age 80)
- Party: Conservative
- Education: Tonbridge School
- Alma mater: Brasenose College, Oxford

Christopher William Bellamy, Baron Bellamy, KC (born 25 April 1946), is a British barrister and former judge.

== Early and personal life ==
Born on 25 April 1946, Bellamy's father was a physician. Bellamy attended the independent Tonbridge School and then Brasenose College, Oxford.

He is a member of the Athenaeum and Garrick clubs.

== Career ==
Bellamy was called to the bar at the Middle Temple in 1968. He spent a year teaching before starting to practise as a barrister in 1970, when he joined Monckton Chambers. He developed specialisms in European, competition and regulatory law, and in 1986 was appointed Queen's Counsel.

Between 1992 and 1999, Bellamy was a judge of the Court of First Instance of the European Communities. He then served as a judge on the Employment Appeal Tribunal between 2000 and 2007, and as president of the United Kingdom's Competition Appeal Tribunals for the Competition Commission (between 1999 and 2003) and then of the Competition Appeal Tribunal (from 2003 to 2007).

After leaving the judiciary in 2007, Bellamy became a senior consultant at Linklaters, where he was appointed chairman of its Global Competition Practice in 2011. He left Linklaters in 2020 and resumed practising as a barrister at Monckton Chambers.

Bellamy was elevated to the peerage as Baron Bellamy in the 2022 Special Honours.

On 7 June 2022, Bellamy was appointed Parliamentary Under-Secretary of State for Justice in the Ministry of Justice, replacing David Wolfson. Aged 76, he became the oldest minister in the Government. He was reappointed by Liz Truss and by Rishi Sunak.

== Honours ==
Bellamy was a bencher of the Middle Temple in 1994. He was knighted in the 2000 New Year Honours. On 14 June 2022, to facilitate his ministerial role, he was created Baron Bellamy, of Waddesdon in the County of Buckinghamshire, for life, and was introduced to the House of Lords the same day, supported by Baroness Scott of Bybrook and Lord Anderson of Ipswich.

Political offices
Preceded by The Lord Wolfson of Tredegar	Parliamentary Under-Secretary of State for Justice; 2022–2024	Succeeded by The Lord Ponsonby of Shulbrede
Orders of precedence in the United Kingdom
Preceded by The Lord Harrington of Watford	Gentlemen; Baron Bellamy	Followed by The Lord Markham
