= Tarsem King, Baron King of West Bromwich =

British politician (1937–2013)

The Right Honourable The Lord King of West Bromwich
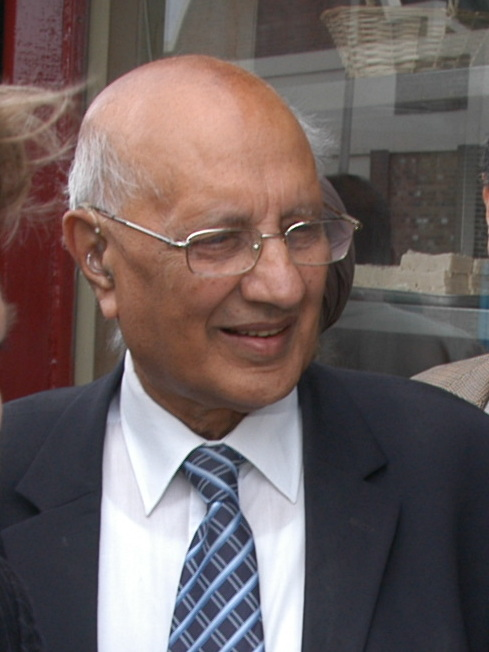
- Tarsem King in 2011
- Occupation: Politician, businessperson

Member of the House of Lords
- Lord Temporal
- Life peerage 22 July 1999 – 9 January 2013

Tarsem King, Baron King of West Bromwich (c. 1937 - 9 January 2013) was a British Labour politician and member of the House of Lords.

He was born in India and he was the first Sikh member of the House of Lords.

King served as Councillor on Sandwell Metropolitan Borough Council from 1979 to 2007; he was a deputy mayor from 1982 to 1983. He was created a life peer on 22 July 1999 as Baron King of West Bromwich, of West Bromwich in the County of West Midlands. From 1999 to 2003 he was a member of the Hybrid Instruments Committee. After 2006 he was Treasurer of the All-party parliamentary group on India.

He was a member of National Advisory Group for Gun Control of National Police Service and President of the Black Country Housing and Community Services Group. He was also the Patron of the Universal Peace Federation which is an affiliate of the Unification Church.

He died of a suspected heart attack on 9 January 2013, at Euston station in London. He was 75.

== Sources ==
- http://www.obv.org.uk/index.php?option=com_content&task=view&id=471&Itemid=115
- https://publications.parliament.uk/pa/ld199899/minutes/990728/ldminute.htm
- http://www.sophiaandme.org.uk/LORDS%20SURNAMES.pdf
- http://peerages.info/peerages5.htm
