= Hybrid bill =

Type of government measure in the UK

In the United Kingdom a hybrid bill (which becomes a hybrid instrument or hybrid act) is a government measure which affects a particular individual or organisation in a different manner to other individuals or companies in the same class; it thus bears some resemblance to a private bill. No definitive rules dictate whether a bill is hybrid in substance; the decision is entrusted via the Speaker, to one or more House of Commons officials designated as the 'Examiners of petitions for Private Bills'. It is thus possible that a government unexpectedly finds itself promoting a private measure, upsetting its planned legislative timetable.

The government tends to initiate these on behalf of other bodies and authorities. The default procedure is they are treated like a private bill for the beginning of passage through the Parliament, laid before select committees of both houses empowered to hear petitions from individuals or bodies opposing it. Nevertheless a government can dispense with this additional procedure if it can muster a Commons majority to do so. The bill is then treated as a public bill. It thus proceeds to possible amendment before a select committee in either or in both Houses.

Examples have been those to construct the Channel Tunnel, the Dartford Crossing, Crossrail and High Speed 2.

Acts that were deemed to be hybrid bills include:

- Aircraft and Shipbuilding Industries Act 1977
- Channel Tunnel Rail Link Act 1996
- Crossrail Act 2008
- High Speed Rail (London–West Midlands) Act 2017
- High Speed Rail (West Midlands-Crewe) Act 2021

Their use originated as part of British parliamentary procedure, but the procedure is also occasionally used by other parliaments and assemblies set up on a similar vein to Westminster.

Hybrid instruments have found an ideal purpose in legislating on behalf of railway companies and transport agencies to obtain authorisation for major projects voted to be in the national interest and which would affect many private interests significantly.

Statutory instruments can be hybrids. When opposed, such instruments are referred to the Hybrid Instruments Committee to report to the House on whether a select committee should be appointed to consider the petition or petitions against the instrument.

In Canada, they are specifically disallowed by Beauchesne's Rules and Forms of the House of Commons of Canada, which states that "According to Canadian standing orders and practice, there are only two kinds of bills – public and private. The British hybrid bill is not recognized in Canadian practice."
