= Gerard Lemos, Baron Lemos =

Indian-British social policy researcher (born 1958)

The Right Honourable The Lord Lemos CMG CBE
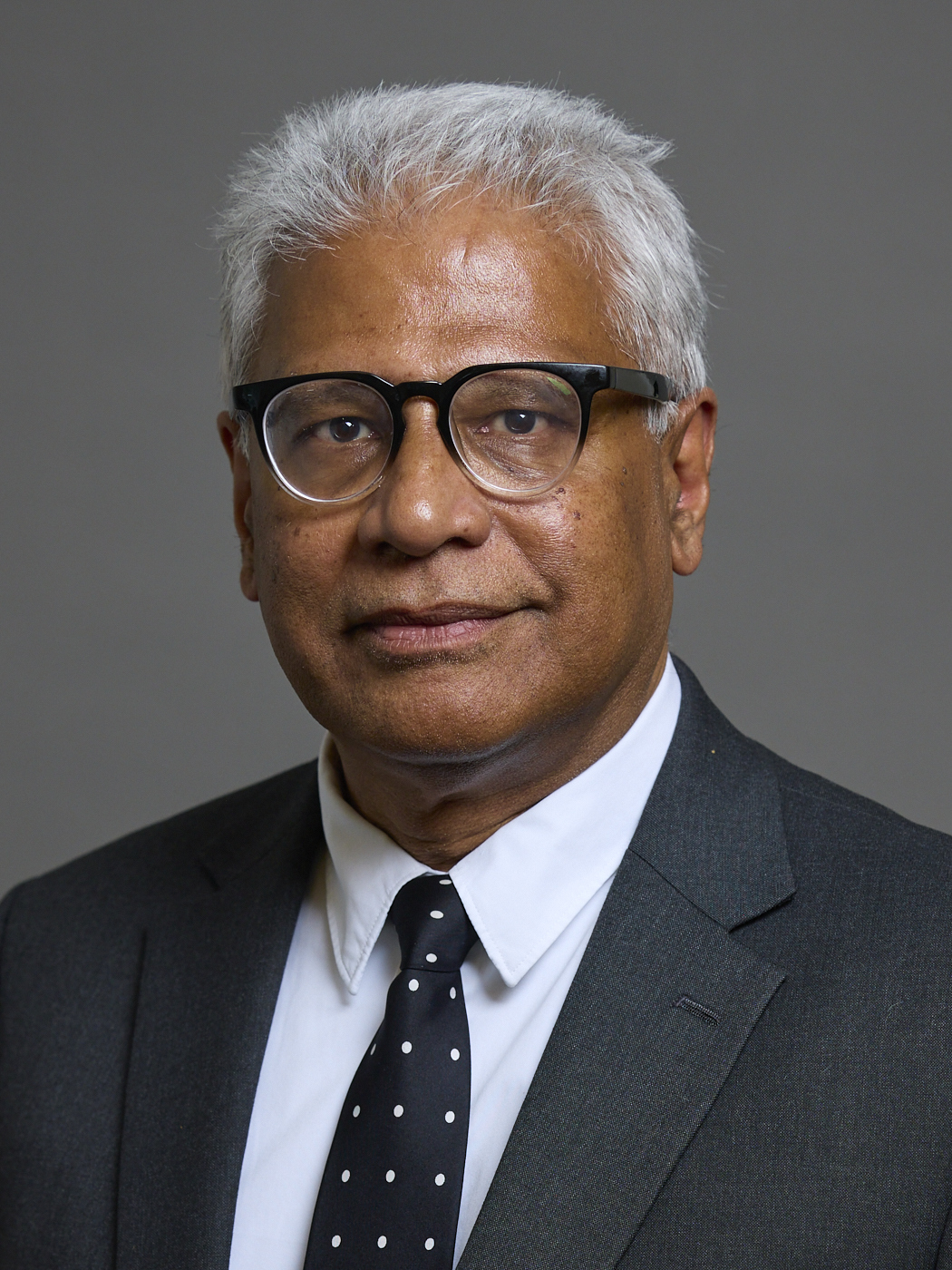
- Official portrait, 2025

Parliamentary Under-Secretary of State for Justice
- Incumbent
- Assumed office 22 July 2026
- Prime Minister: Andy Burnham
- Preceded by: The Baroness Levitt

Parliamentary Under-Secretary of State for Faith
- In office 12 June 2026 – 22 July 2026
- Prime Minister: Keir Starmer
- Preceded by: Miatta Fahnbulleh (Devolution, Faith and Communities)
- Succeeded by: Florence Eshalomi

Lord-in-Waiting
- In office 22 July 2025 – 12 June 2026
- Prime Minister: Keir Starmer
- Preceded by: Baron Moraes
- Succeeded by: Baroness Ramsey

Member of the House of Lords
- Lord Temporal
- Life peerage 22 January 2025

Personal details
- Born: Gerard Anthony Lemos; 26 February 1958 (age 68) India
- Party: Labour
- Education: University of York

Gerard Anthony Lemos, Baron Lemos, CMG, CBE (born 26 February 1958), is an Indian-British social policy researcher, author and life peer.

== Early life and education ==
Gerard Anthony Lemos was born in India on 26 February 1958 to Ronald Lemos and Cynthia Lemos (née Mitchell). He grew up in Croydon, London, and was privately educated at Dulwich College before studying history and English at the University of York.

== Career ==
Three years after leaving university, Lemos established ASRA Housing Association, an Asian housing association, in 1982 from the back room of a south-west London church hall. He was then the director of development of Circle 33 Housing Trust before co-founding the researchers and publishers Lemos & Crane in 1990.

From 2000 to 2004, Lemos was a member of the Audit Commission and served as the first head of its housing advisory board. He was a Civil Service commissioner from 2001 to 2006 and a non-executive director of the Crown Prosecution Service from 2006 to 2010. He was the chairman of the Payments Council and its successor, Payments UK, from 2014 to 2018, and subsequently the lead non-executive director of HM Prison and Probation Service from 2018 to 2025.

Lemos was appointed to the board of trustees of the British Council in 1999 and was its acting chair from 2009 to 2010. He served as the vice-president of the British Board of Film Classification from 2008 to 2018, and chaired English Heritage from 2023 to 2025 and National Savings and Investments from 2024 to 2025.

A long-time collaborator of Michael Young, Lemos co-founded the School for Social Entrepreneurs, designing and delivering the inaugural learning programme.

=== Peerage ===
In late 2024, Lemos was nominated for a Labour Party life peerage by Prime Minister Keir Starmer. He was created Baron Lemos, of Thornton Heath in the London Borough of Croydon, on 22 January 2025, and was introduced to the House of Lords on 3 February. He was appointed a Lord-in-Waiting on 22 July 2025.

== Honours ==
Lemos was appointed Companion of the Order of St Michael and St George (CMG) in the 2001 Birthday Honours for services to the British Council. He was later appointed Commander of the Order of the British Empire (CBE) in the 2024 New Year Honours for public and voluntary service at HM Prison and Probation Service.

== Books ==
Childhood and Contemporary Catholicism, 2024, Lemos&Crane

The Good Prison: Conscience, crime and punishment, 2014, Lemos&Crane

The End of the Chinese Dream: Why Chinese people fear the future, 2012, Yale University Press

The Communities We Have Lost and Can Regain, (with Michael Young), 1997, Lemos&Crane
