= Scott Mann (politician) =

British Conservative politician

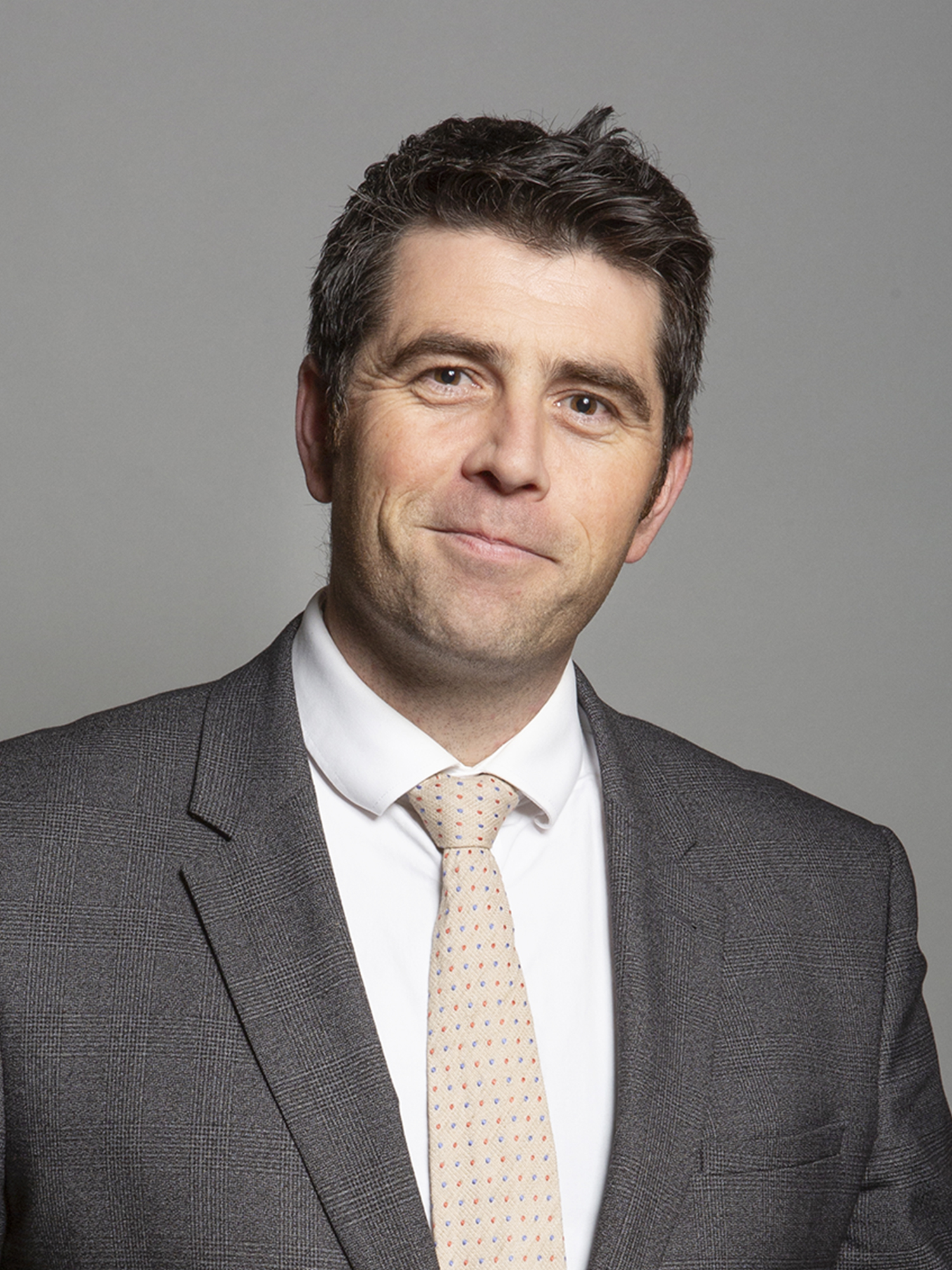
- Official portrait, 2019

Lord Commissioner of the Treasury
- In office 28 October 2022 – 5 July 2024
- Prime Minister: Rishi Sunak
- In office 22 January 2021 – 20 September 2022
- Prime Minister: Boris Johnson

Parliamentary Under-Secretary of State for Growth and Rural Affairs
- In office 20 September 2022 – 28 October 2022
- Prime Minister: Liz Truss
- Preceded by: The Lord Benyon
- Succeeded by: The Lord Benyon

Member of Parliament for North Cornwall
- In office 7 May 2015 – 30 May 2024
- Preceded by: Dan Rogerson
- Succeeded by: Ben Maguire

Personal details
- Born: 24 June 1977 (age 49) Wadebridge, Cornwall, England
- Party: Conservative
- Website: Official website

Scott Leslie Mann (born 24 June 1977) is a British Conservative politician who was the Member of Parliament (MP) for North Cornwall from 2015 to 2024. He served as Parliamentary Under-Secretary of State for Growth and Rural Affairs from September to October 2022 and a Government Whip (Lord Commissioner of the Treasury). Between 2009 and 2016 he represented the Wadebridge West ward on Cornwall Council.

== Early life and career ==
Scott Mann was born on 24 June 1977 in Wadebridge, Cornwall. He attended Wadebridge Secondary School. His father had grown up in Bodmin and had a career in boat construction. His mother grew up in St Kew Highway, Cornwall.

After leaving school at 16, Mann attended St Austell College, completing a BTEC business diploma, before becoming a postman for the Royal Mail in 1995 until 2015, based at the local sorting office in Wadebridge.

== Political career ==
In 2007, Mann was elected as a Conservative councillor for Wadebridge West, serving briefly on the North Cornwall District Council before it was absorbed by the now unitary authority that is Cornwall Council in 2009, when he was re-elected. In 2013, Mann retained his seat as county councillor for Wadebridge West.

In February 2012, Mann resigned as deputy leader of the Conservative group on Cornwall Council in protest at £16 million of public money being used to fund a proposed sports stadium near Truro. In 2014, Mann met with Conservative MP and Secretary of State for Culture, Media and Sport Sajid Javid in Cornwall to campaign for the continued support for community leisure centres which were at threat of losing funding from the local authority.

== Parliamentary career ==
In 2013, Mann was named as the Conservative Party's prospective parliamentary candidate for North Cornwall.

=== 1st term as MP (2015–2017) ===
At the 2015 general election, Mann was elected to Parliament as MP for North Cornwall with 45% of the vote and a majority of 6,621. Along with Sarah Newton, MP for Truro & Falmouth, he took his Parliamentary oath in the Cornish language.

In November 2015, Mann introduced a Private member's bill to give Town and Parish Councils the power to hold community referendums to alter speed limits. The Bill received its second reading in February 2016, but as it was opposed by both the Government and the Opposition, it was subsequently withdrawn.

Following his election as an MP he resigned as a councillor in February 2016, after he had come under pressure to resign for his poor attendance at council meetings.

In May 2016, it emerged that Mann was one of a number of Conservative MPs being investigated by police in the 2015 United Kingdom general election party spending investigation, for allegedly spending more than the legal limit on constituency election campaign expenses. However, in May 2017, the Crown Prosecution Service said that while there was evidence of inaccurate spending returns, it did not "meet the test" for further action.

Mann campaigned for the United Kingdom to leave the European Union in the 2016 EU referendum.

In December 2016, Mann was elected unopposed to the House of Commons' Environmental Audit Select Committee, on which he served until May 2017.

In March 2017, The Daily Telegraph reported that Mann was one of nine MPs who had claimed Amazon Prime subscriptions on their parliamentary expenses. The Independent Parliamentary Standards Authority, responsible for handling expenses claims, told the paper subscriptions could be claimed but MPs must "justify the subscription is primarily used for Parliamentary purposes". He responded that the subscription was a mistake after his office had purchased stationery from the website, and that Amazon had issued a refund.

=== 2nd term as MP (2017–2019) ===
At the snap 2017 general election, Mann was re-elected as MP for North Cornwall with an increased vote share of 50.7% and an increased majority of 7,200.

After the election, Mann was appointed as a Parliamentary Private Secretary (PPS) for Transport – an unpaid role to assist and support government ministers in the Department for Transport. Following the Cabinet reshuffle in January 2018, Mann was appointed as PPS to HM Treasury.

In July 2018, Mann introduced his second Private Member's Bill – the Bathing Waters Bill – to introduce penalties which could be levied against water companies who pump sewage into the sea.

On 16 July 2018, Mann resigned from his role as PPS to the Treasury in protest at the Prime Minister Theresa May's "watered down" Brexit plan. In September 2018, he agreed with fellow Conservative MP Johnny Mercer that Theresa May "could not lead their party into the next general election".

=== 3rd term as MP (2019–2024) ===
Mann was again re-elected at the 2019 general election with an increased vote share of 59.4% and an increased majority of 14,752.

In January 2020, Mann was appointed as Parliamentary Private Secretary to Gavin Williamson, the Secretary of State for Education.

In July 2020, Mann became one of four vice-chairs of the All Party Parliamentary Group on Whistleblowing, which has been subject to criticism by some campaigners on whistleblowing law reform.

In January 2021, Mann was appointed as Government Whip, Lord Commissioner of HM Treasury. That April he was shifted to become an Assistant Government Whip (unpaid).

On 20 September 2022, Mann received his first ministerial appointment as Parliamentary Under Secretary of State at the Department for Environment, Food and Rural Affairs. This was part of the UK Government ministerial reshuffle following the appointment of Liz Truss as Prime Minister earlier that month.

On 4 July 2024, Mann lost his seat to Ben Maguire, the Liberal Democrat candidate in the 2024 general election.

== Personal life ==
Mann lives in Wadebridge and in London. He has one daughter. He is the honorary vice-president of Wadebridge Cricket Club. He is a supporter of Plymouth Argyle F.C.

Mann employed his partner as a part-time secretary on a salary up to £30,000, which drew criticism by the press. Although MPs who were first elected in 2017 have been banned from employing family members, the restriction is prospective, meaning that Mann's employment of his partner was lawful.

On a summer boat trip in 2016 Mann had to be rescued from drowning by fellow MP Johnny Mercer after he voluntarily jumped into the water because, he was "ashamed to admit" that he could not swim well. He later said he endangered his life because he was "afraid to own up to something that [he] considered an embarrassment". He has since taken swimming lessons. He ran the London Marathon in 2017.

Parliament of the United Kingdom
Preceded by Dan Rogerson	Member of Parliament for North Cornwall; 2015–2024	Succeeded by Ben Maguire
