= Parliamentary Under-Secretary of State for Justice =

British Government minister

United Kingdom Parliamentary Under-Secretary of State and Lords Minister
- Royal Arms of His Majesty's Government

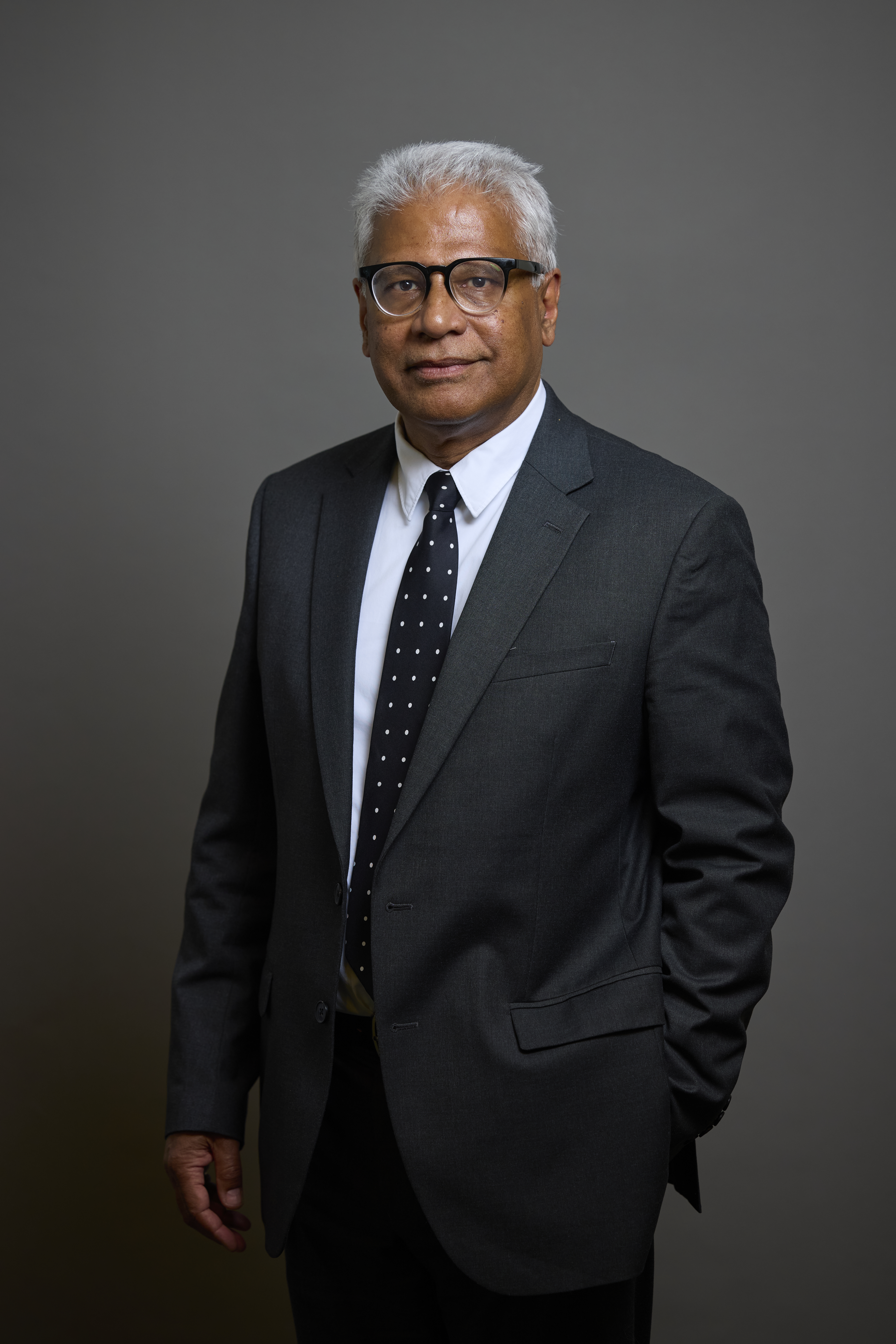
- Incumbent; Gerard Lemos, Baron Lemos since 22 July 2026
- Ministry of Justice
- Style: Minister
- Nominator: Prime Minister of the United Kingdom
- Appointer: The Monarch; on advice of the Prime Minister
- Term length: At His Majesty's pleasure
- Website: Official website

The Parliamentary Under-Secretary of State for Justice is a junior position in the Ministry of Justice in the British Government. The present incumbent is Gerard Lemos, Baron Lemos, who succeeded Alison Levitt, Baroness Levitt in July 2026.

== Role ==
The Government website sets out the current Minister's responsibilities in the Ministry of Justice as:

- All Lords Business
- Cross-cutting CJS Strategy

The Ministry of Justice is the government department responsible for overseeing the Crown Dependencies with the Secretary of State for Justice (Lord Chancellor) being the privy counsellor responsible for the Dependencies. However the day to day duties are handled by the Under-Secretary of State for Justice, who is a less senior minister in the Ministry of Justice.

== List of officeholders ==
Minister	Term of office		Party	Prime Minister
Parliamentary Under-Secretary of State for Constitutional Affairs
The Lord Filkin	13 June 2003	9 September 2004	Labour	Tony Blair
The Baroness Ashton of Upholland	9 September 2004	8 May 2007	Labour	Tony Blair
Parliamentary Under-Secretary of State for Justice
The Baroness Ashton of Upholland	8 May 2007	27 June 2007	Labour	Tony Blair
The Lord Hunt of Kings Heath	2 July 2007	5 October 2008	Labour	Gordon Brown
The Lord Bach	5 October 2008	11 May 2010	Labour	Gordon Brown
Minister of State for Justice
The Lord McNally	13 May 2010	18 December 2013	Liberal Democrats	David Cameron
Minister of State for Civil Justice and Legal Policy
The Lord Faulks	20 January 2014	19 July 2016	Conservative	David Cameron
Government Spokesperson for the Ministry of Justice
The Lord Keen of Elie Advocate General for Scotland	18 July 2016	16 September 2020	Conservative	Theresa May; Boris Johnson
Parliamentary Under-Secretary of State for Justice
The Lord Wolfson of Tredegar	22 December 2020	13 April 2022	Conservative	Boris Johnson
The Lord Bellamy	7 July 2022	5 July 2024	Conservative	Boris Johnson
The Lord Bellamy	7 July 2022	5 July 2024	Conservative	Liz Truss; Rishi Sunak
The Lord Ponsonby of Shulbrede	9 July 2024	6 September 2025	Labour	Keir Starmer
The Baroness Levitt	6 September 2025	22 July 2026	Labour	Keir Starmer
The Lord Lemos	22 July 2026	Incumbent	Labour	Andy Burnham
