= Dan Rogerson =

British politician (born 1975)

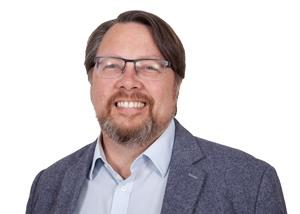
- Official portrait, 2025

Member of Cornwall Council for Bodmin St Mary's and St Leonard
- Incumbent
- Assumed office 1 May 2025

Liberal Democrat Spokesperson for Environment, Food and Rural Affairs
- In office 7 January 2015 – 8 May 2015
- Leader: Nick Clegg
- Preceded by: Tim Farron (2010)
- Succeeded by: The Baroness Parminter

Parliamentary Under-Secretary of State for Water, Forestry, Rural Affairs and Resource Management
- In office 7 October 2013 – 8 May 2015
- Prime Minister: David Cameron
- Preceded by: Richard Benyon
- Succeeded by: Rory Stewart

Member of Parliament for North Cornwall
- In office 5 May 2005 – 30 March 2015
- Preceded by: Paul Tyler
- Succeeded by: Scott Mann

Personal details
- Born: 23 July 1975 (age 51) St Austell, Cornwall, England
- Party: Liberal Democrat
- Spouse: Heidi Purser (m. 1999; div. 2021)
- Children: 3
- Education: University of Wales, Aberystwyth
- Occupation: Politician

Daniel John Rogerson (born July 23, 1975 in St Austell) is a British Liberal Democrat politician. He was the Member of Parliament (MP) for North Cornwall from the 2005 general election until his defeat at the 2015 general election. In October 2013, he became the Liberal Democrat Minister at the Department for Environment, Food and Rural Affairs, holding the office until losing his Parliamentary seat to Conservative candidate Scott Mann. Rogerson currently serves as a councillor and cabinet member on Cornwall Council.

== Early life and career ==
Born in Cornwall, Rogerson grew up in Bodmin, attending Bodmin College (comprehensive school), before studying Politics at the University of Wales Aberystwyth. Whilst a student, Rogerson worked at the Proper Cornish pasty factory in Bodmin.

Dan Rogerson joined the Liberal Democrats whilst still at school in 1991 to help fight for the election of Paul Tyler at the 1992 general election.

He worked at Bedford Borough Council before being elected to the Council himself in 1999 for the ward of Kingsbook. He served as councillor, and later Deputy Group Leader, until 2002. Following his election as a local councillor he worked in University administration.

Rogerson first stood for Parliament in 2001, contesting the North East Bedfordshire seat, increasing the Liberal Democrats' share of the vote by 2.1%.

== Political career ==
In the 2005 general election he was elected for the North Cornwall seat and used the Cornish language during the swearing of allegiance in Parliament along with Andrew George in an effort to support the preservation of Cornish identity and culture. In 2006 Rogerson asked the government to make 5 March a public holiday in Cornwall to recognise celebrations for St Piran's Day.

Rogerson was chair of the All-Party Parliamentary Group on cheese, and opposed Ofcom's inclusion of cheese in its new regulations restricting television advertising of junk foods to children aged under 16.

He was also a member of the All-Party Parliamentary Group on religious education.

On July 14, 2009, Dan Rogerson presented a Cornish "breakaway" Bill to Parliament. The Bill proposed a devolved Cornish Assembly, similar to the Welsh and Scottish set-up.

He was Liberal Democrat Shadow Minister for Communities and Local Government until the 2010 election and was the youngest male MP in the House of Commons during the 2005–2010 Parliament.

He was appointed the co-chair of the Liberal Democrat Parliamentary Committee for Education, Families and Young People in July 2010.

In the 2010 general election Dan Rogerson successfully held his seat in North Cornwall with a majority of 6.36%. He repeated his parliamentary oath in Cornish as he did after the previous election.

In December 2010, Rogerson was one of the twenty-one Liberal Democrat MPs who voted against the tuition fee rise.

In 2013, Rogerson voted in favour of legalising same-sex marriage in England and Wales.

Following a government reshuffle, Rogerson was appointed Parliamentary Under-Secretary of State for Water, Forestry, Resource Management and Rural Affairs at the Department for Environment, Food and Rural Affairs, a role he held until the 2015 general election.

In the 2015 general election, Rogerson stood for re-election as MP for North Cornwall, but was defeated by Conservative candidate Scott Mann by 6,621 votes - a swing of over 9,000.

In the 2017 general election, Rogerson was nominated by the LibDems hoping to retake the seat from Scott Mann, but was not successful.

In July 2018, Rogerson announced that he would not contest the North Cornwall seat again for the following general election, stating that someone new was needed to defeat MP Scott Mann. This resulted in Danny Chambers being selected for the 2019 general election.

At the 2021 Cornwall Council election, he was a candidate for the Launceston South ward, but was defeated by a margin of 3 votes.

At the 2025 Cornwall Council election, he was elected as councillor for the Bodmin St Mary's and St Leonard ward, winning 55% of the vote. He was subsequently appointed to the cabinet of the Liberal Democrat-led administration.

== Personal life ==
He married Heidi Purser in August 1999 in Bodmin. They have two sons and one daughter. They were divorced in 2021.

== See also ==
- List of topics related to Cornwall
- Cornish Assembly

Parliament of the United Kingdom
Preceded by Paul Tyler	Member of Parliament for North Cornwall; 2005–2015	Succeeded by Scott Mann
