= Nkwanta South (Ghana parliament constituency) =

Constituency in Ghana

- constituency for the Parliament of Ghana
- District: Nkwanta South District
- Region: Oti Region of Ghana

Current constituency
- Created: 2004
- Party: National Democratic Congress
- MP: Geoffrey Kini

Nkwanta South is one of the constituencies represented in the Parliament of Ghana. It elects one Member of Parliament (MP) by the first past the post system of election. Nkwanta South is located in the Nkwanta South district of the Oti Region of Ghana.

== Boundaries ==
The seat is located within the Nkwanta District of the Volta Region of Ghana. It was formed prior to the 2004 December presidential and parliamentary elections by the division of the old Nkwanta constituency into the new Nkwanta South and Nkwanta South constituencies.

== Members of Parliament ==
First elected	Member	Party
1992	Nkwanta constituency	
1996	Gershon Kofi Bediako Gbediame	National Democratic Congress
2004	Constituency changed from Nkwanta to Nkwanta South	
2004	Gershon Kofi Bediako Gbediame	National Democratic Congress
2016	Geoffrey Kini	National Democratic Congress

== Elections ==
2004 Ghanaian parliamentary election:Nkwanta South Source:Electoral Commission of Ghana
Party	Candidate	Votes	%	±%
National Democratic Congress	Gershon Kofi Bediako Gbediame	15,569	52.2	N/A
New Patriotic Party	Joseph Booker Yaw Denteh	8,605	28.9	N/A
People's National Convention	Michael Lijowel Punaful	5,178	17.4	N/A
Convention People's Party	Samuel Awiagah	457	1.5	N/A
Majority		6,964	23.3	N/A
Turnout		30,763	85.6	N/A

2000 Ghanaian parliamentary election:Nkwanta Source:Adam Carr's Election Archives
Party	Candidate	Votes	%	±%
National Democratic Congress	Gershon Kofi Bediako Gbediame	20,734	53.4	N/A
New Patriotic Party	Abdulai Fuhlamba	8,969	23.1	N/A
National Reform Party	Mawah Martin Bacheri	4,737	12.2	N/A
People's National Convention	Musah Braimah Adams	1,978	5.1	N/A
Convention People's Party	Samuel K. Asare	1,921	4.9	N/A
United Ghana Movement	Joe Washington Ampim	468	1.2	N/A
Majority		11,765	30.3	N/A

== See also ==
- List of Ghana Parliament constituencies
