= Richard Benyon =

British politician (born 1960)

The Right Honourable The Lord Benyon GCVO PC
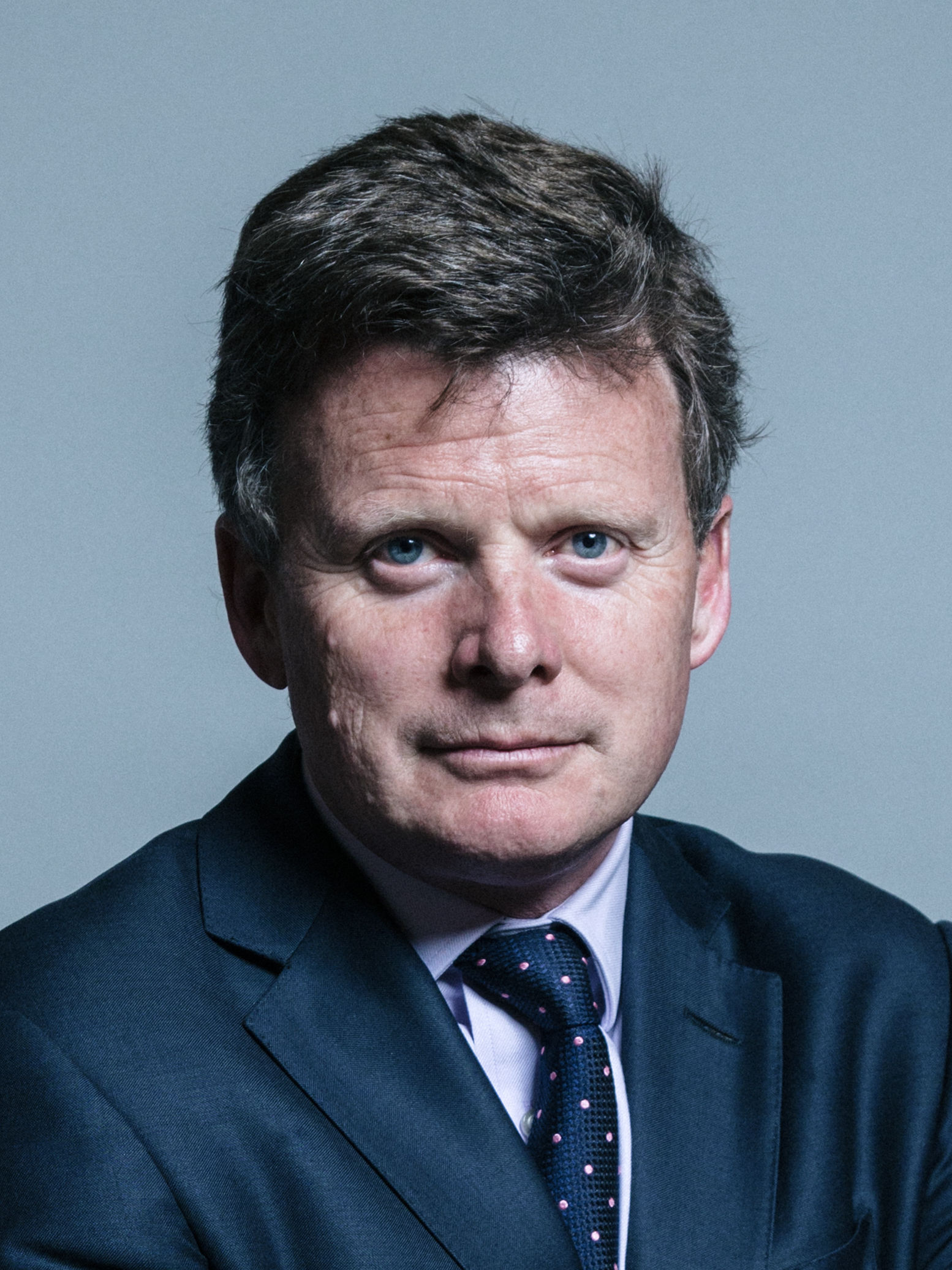
- Official portrait, 2017

Lord Chamberlain of the Household
- Incumbent
- Assumed office 4 November 2024
- Monarch: Charles III
- Preceded by: The Lord Parker of Minsmere

Minister of State for Climate, Environment and Energy
- In office 14 November 2023 – 5 July 2024
- Prime Minister: Rishi Sunak
- Preceded by: The Lord Goldsmith of Richmond Park
- Succeeded by: Vacant

Minister of State for Biosecurity, Marine and Rural Affairs (Note: Parliamentary Under-Secretary of State for Rural Affairs, Access to Nature and Biosecurity from May 2021 to September 2022 and Natural Environment, Water and Rural Affairs from June 2010 to October 2013.)
- In office 30 October 2022 – 14 November 2023
- Prime Minister: Rishi Sunak
- Preceded by: Scott Mann
- Succeeded by: Robbie Moore (Rural); The Lord Douglas-Miller (Biosecurity)
- In office 13 May 2021 – 20 September 2022
- Prime Minister: Boris Johnson
- Preceded by: The Lord Gardiner of Kimble
- Succeeded by: Scott Mann
- In office 6 June 2010 – 7 October 2013
- Prime Minister: David Cameron
- Preceded by: Dan Norris
- Succeeded by: Dan Rogerson

Parliamentary Under-Secretary of State for International Environment
- In office 20 September 2022 – 25 October 2022
- Prime Minister: Liz Truss
- Preceded by: The Lord Goldsmith of Richmond Park
- Succeeded by: Vacant

Member of the House of Lords
- Lord Temporal
- Life peerage 26 January 2021

Member of Parliament for Newbury
- In office 5 May 2005 – 6 November 2019
- Preceded by: David Rendel
- Succeeded by: Laura Farris

Personal details
- Born: Richard Henry Ronald Benyon; 21 October 1960 (age 65) Reading, Berkshire, England
- Party: Crossbench (since 2024); Conservative (until 2024) (Note: Sat as an independent while the Conservative whip was suspended from 3 September to 28 October 2019)
- Spouses: Emma Villiers (divorced); Zoe Robinson
- Children: 5
- Parent: Bill Benyon (father)
- Education: Bradfield College
- Alma mater: Royal Agricultural College
- Website: www.richardbenyon.com

Military service
- Allegiance: United Kingdom
- Branch/service: British Army
- Years of service: 1981–1985
- Rank: Lieutenant
- Unit: Royal Green Jackets

Richard Henry Ronald Benyon, Baron Benyon (born 21 October 1960) is a British politician who has served as Lord Chamberlain of the Household since 4 November 2024. He previously was Minister of State for Climate, Environment and Energy from 2023 to 2024. A member of the Conservative Party, he was Member of Parliament (MP) for Newbury from 2005 to 2019.

Benyon studied at the Royal Agricultural College and Royal Military Academy Sandhurst before serving in the British Army, and was posted to Northern Ireland and the Far East with the Royal Green Jackets. He was elected to Newbury District Council in 1991 and became Conservative group leader in 1994.

Benyon became MP for Newbury at the 2005 general election. In opposition, he served on the Home Affairs Select Committee, as an opposition whip and as a shadow minister for the Department for Environment, Food and Rural Affairs (DEFRA). Under David Cameron, he first served as a government minister at DEFRA from May 2010 to October 2013. He had the Conservative whip removed on 3 September 2019 by Prime Minister Boris Johnson, after voting against the government, and sat as an independent MP until he had the whip restored on 28 October 2019.

Benyon was appointed to the House of Lords by Prime Minister Boris Johnson. Following the resignation of Lord Gardiner of Kimble in May 2021, he was made a parliamentary under-secretary of state at the Department for Environment, Food and Rural Affairs.

== Early life ==
Benyon was born on 21 October 1960 in Reading. He is the elder son of Sir William Richard Benyon (né Shelley), a Conservative Member of Parliament from 1970 until 1992, and is the great-great-grandson of former Conservative Prime Minister Lord Salisbury. He is the nephew of Admiral Sir David John Hallifax and a great-grandson of Sir John Shelley, 9th Baronet. He was educated at nearby Bradfield College and the Royal Agricultural College.

== Military service ==
Having attended the Royal Military Academy Sandhurst, he was commissioned into the Royal Green Jackets, British Army, as a second lieutenant on 8 August 1981. He was promoted to lieutenant on 8 August 1983.

During his four years' service, he was posted to Northern Ireland, other parts of the UK, and the Far East. He transferred to the Regular Army Reserve of Officers on 8 August 1984, thereby ending his military career but maintaining call-up liability.

== Political career ==
He was elected in 1991 to Newbury District Council, and became Conservative group leader in 1994, in opposition to the then-ruling Liberal Democrats. He lost his council seat in 1995.

=== House of Commons ===
Benyon contested the Newbury constituency at the 1997 general election but lost heavily to the 1993 by-election incumbent Liberal Democrat David Rendel. Benyon and Rendel contested Newbury again at the 2001 general election, and Rendel came out again as the victor with a reduced majority. He and Rendel again contested Newbury at the 2005 general election and Benyon was elected with a majority of 3,460, replacing Rendel.

Benyon made his maiden speech on 20 May 2005 and served on the Home Affairs Select Committee from 2005 to 2007, when he became an Opposition Whip. He was the Shadow Minister for the Environment, Food and Rural Affairs from 2009 until the 2010 general election when he entered government. He was also one of the first 15 MPs to support David Cameron's Conservative Party leadership bid.

In May 2009, he was listed by The Daily Telegraph as one of the "saints" in the expenses scandal exposed by that newspaper.

Benyon was made Parliamentary Under-Secretary of State at the Department for the Environment, Food and Rural Affairs in the first Cameron Ministry. and remained in post until a ministerial reshuffle in October 2013.

In 2012, while Wildlife Minister, Benyon refused a request from other MPs that possession of carbofuran, a deadly poison used to kill raptors that is banned in Canada and the European Union, should be made a criminal offence. Green Party MP Caroline Lucas was quoted as saying: "The minister's shocking refusal to outlaw the possession of a poison used only by rogue gamekeepers to illegally kill birds of prey would be inexplicable were it not for his own cosy links to the shooting lobby".

In December 2012, Benyon's neighbours complained when Hanson Aggregates were given permission to extract 200,000 tonnes of sand and gravel a year from woodlands on Benyon's family estate, leading it to be described as a 'bombsite'. Benyon said that the estate was controlled by a family trust.

In 2013, Benyon succeeded in preventing any cuts in fishing quotas. He said that if British fishermen had their quotas cut they would dump even more fish overboard, and the more fish they are allowed to catch, the better it will be for "the health of our seas". Back in 2004, the Royal Commission on Environmental Pollution proposed that 30% of the United Kingdom's waters should become reserves preventing fishing or any other kind of extraction.

Also in 2013, Benyon's policy relating to access to rivers and his role as an owner of fishing rights was criticised. Writing in The Guardian, George Monbiot wrote that Benyon "repeatedly wields his power in ways that promote his own interests" and being "so enmeshed in potential conflicts of interest that were he to recuse himself from all the issues in which he has a personal stake, he would have nothing to do but order the departmental paperclips".

Benyon was opposed to Brexit prior to the 2016 European Union membership referendum. On 16 December 2016, he was appointed to the Privy Council of the United Kingdom.

In 2017, Benyon was accused of nepotism by Private Eye after he hired his sister, Catherine Haig, as a part-time senior researcher in his office just before a parliamentary ban on such practices came into force. This accusation was in spite of her extensive qualifications for the job.

On 3 September 2019, Benyon – along with 20 other Conservative MPs – had the Conservative whip removed by Prime Minister Boris Johnson, after voting against the government and supporting an emergency motion to allow the House of Commons to undertake proceedings on the European Union (Withdrawal) (No. 6) Bill. Benyon sat as an independent MP until he had the Conservative whip restored on 28 October 2019.

According to The Register of Members' Financial Interests, as at 21 January 2019, he was paid £15,000 per annum by the UK Water Partnership, a not-for-profit company set up to promote the interests of the UK water sector. He received donations amounting to £8,250 in 2018, from Philip Lavallin Wroughton (three payments amounting to £7,000) and from Chris Gent (a single payment of £1,250).

Benyon stood down as Member of Parliament for Newbury at the 2019 general election citing disagreements over Brexit.

=== House of Lords ===
Benyon was appointed to the House of Lords by Prime Minister Boris Johnson in late 2020. He was created Baron Benyon, of Englefield in the Royal County of Berkshire, on 26 January 2021.

On 13 May 2021, Benyon was made Parliamentary Under-Secretary of State for Rural Affairs and Biosecurity following the resignation of Lord Gardiner of Kimble. On 25 October 2022, Prime Minister Rishi Sunak appointed Benyon a minister of state at the Department for Environment, Food and Rural Affairs, in which role he served until the 2024 general election.

Benyon became a crossbencher in the House of Lords on 10 September 2024.

== Philanthropy ==
Benyon is a patron of the charity Berkshire Vision, a charity dedicated to supporting the visually impaired in the county.

Benyon is one of nine Vice-Presidents of Berkshire County Scout Council.

== Property ==
Benyon has a wealth of over £100 million as of 2014, from his control of the Englefield Estate, a 14,000-acre (5,700 ha) estate of mainly rural land and property in West Berkshire and Hampshire between Reading, Newbury and Basingstoke. It is the largest private landowner in West Berkshire. The family seat is Englefield House, a large Grade II* listed building owned by the Benyon family for many generations.

Englefield Estates owns the Benyon Estate, a portfolio of 371 homes in Hackney, London. His brother Edward Benyon manages the London properties. In March 2014, the Benyon Estate bought a 10% stake in the New Era Estate in Hoxton, and was awarded the contract to manage the estate. They sold their share in November 2014 following a dispute over rent.

Benyon also owns the Glenmazeran Estate in Inverness, Scotland.

== Personal life ==
In December 2017, Benyon was banned from driving for six months after pleading guilty to texting while driving. He had previously spoken out against mobile phone-using drivers after four people were killed by a distracted driver in an accident in his constituency.

Benyon was appointed Lord Chamberlain by King Charles III on 4 November 2024, and was appointed a Knight Grand Cross of the Royal Victorian Order (GCVO).

== Notes ==
Parliament of the United Kingdom
Preceded by David Rendel	Member of Parliament for Newbury; 2005–2019	Succeeded by Laura Farris
Court offices
Preceded by The Lord Parker of Minsmere	Lord Chamberlain; 2024–present	Incumbent
Order of precedence in England and Wales
Preceded by The Earl of Rosslyn as Lord Steward of the Household	Gentlemen as Lord Chamberlain of the Household	Succeeded by The Lord Ashton of Hyde as Master of the Horse
