= Alison Levitt, Baroness Levitt =

British barrister (born 1963)

The Right Honourable The Baroness Levitt KC
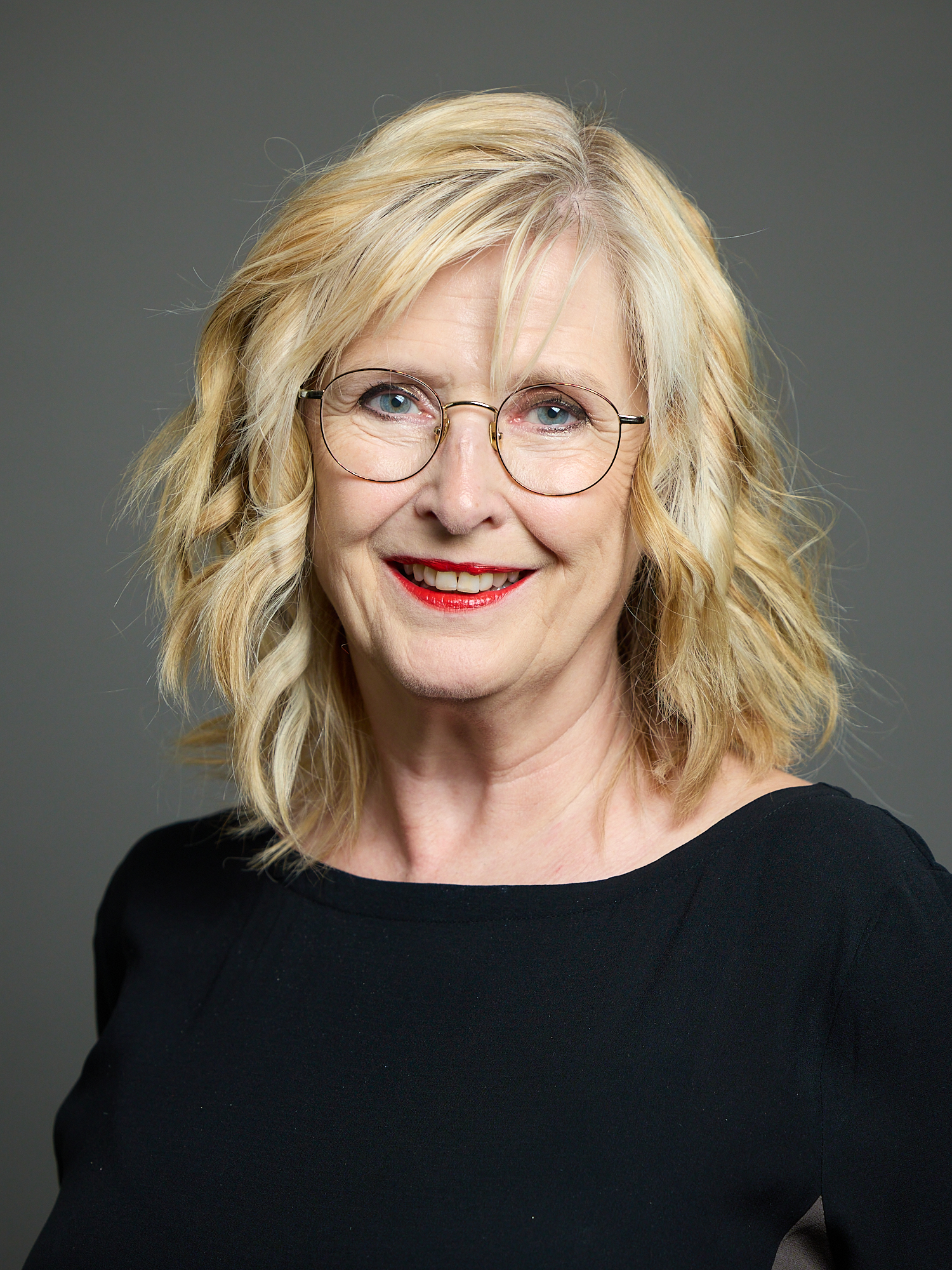
- Official portrait, 2025

Parliamentary Under-Secretary of State for Justice
- In office 6 September 2025 – 22 July 2026
- Prime Minister: Keir Starmer
- Preceded by: The Lord Ponsonby of Shulbrede
- Succeeded by: The Lord Lemos

Member of the House of Lords
- Lord Temporal
- Life peerage 22 January 2025

Personal details
- Born: Alison Frances Josephine Levitt; 27 May 1963 (age 63) London, England
- Party: Labour
- Spouses: Matthew Miller (m. 1993) Alex Carlile (m. 2007)
- Children: 2 daughters, one stepson, 2 stepdaughters
- Education: University of St Andrews (MA)

Alison Frances Josephine Levitt, Baroness Levitt KC (born 27 May 1963), is an English barrister and Labour life peer. She was the principal legal advisor to the director of public prosecutions from 2009 to 2014, working under Keir Starmer, and served as a circuit judge from 2021 to 2024. She was appointed to the House of Lords as a life peer in 2025, and served as Parliamentary Under-Secretary of State for Justice from September 2025 to July 2026.

== Early life and education ==
Alison Levitt was born on 27 May 1963 in London. Her father, David Levitt, was an architect and co-founder of the architectural practice Levitt Bernstein, and her mother, Christian Bevington, was a circuit judge. Levitt was educated privately at the City of London School for Girls. In 1986, she took a MA from the University of St Andrews.

== Legal career ==
Levitt was called to the bar in 1988 by the Inner Temple. Her private practice as a barrister in London focused on murder, rape, fraud, and other areas of serious crime. She chaired the Bar Council's Young Barristers' Committee in 1995 and was the secretary of the Criminal Bar Association in 2006 and 2007. Levitt was appointed a recorder in 2006 and Queen's Counsel (QC) in 2008, and became a bencher of the Inner Temple in 2010.

In 2009, Levitt was appointed as the principal legal advisor to the director of public prosecutions, then Keir Starmer. She conducted the Crown Prosecution Service's review of its handling of allegations made in the Jimmy Savile sexual abuse scandal. After leaving the post in 2014, Levitt became a partner at the law firm Mishcon de Reya, establishing and heading its group on white-collar crime. She returned to the bar in 2018 and was appointed as a circuit judge in 2021, resigning upon her appointment as a life peer in 2024.

== House of Lords ==
In late 2024, Levitt was nominated for a life peerage by Prime Minister Keir Starmer. She was created Baroness Levitt, of Beachamwell Warren in the County of Norfolk, on 22 January 2025, and was introduced to the House of Lords on 30 January.

== Personal life ==
In 1993, Levitt married Matthew Miller, with whom she has two daughters. After their divorce, Levitt married Alex Carlile in 2007. Carlile, a barrister and former judge, was a Liberal Party and Liberal Democrat member of Parliament from 1983 to 1997, and was himself appointed to the House of Lords as Lord Carlile of Berriew in 1999.
