= David Wolfson, Baron Wolfson of Tredegar =

British politician (born 1968)

The Right Honourable The Lord Wolfson of Tredegar KC
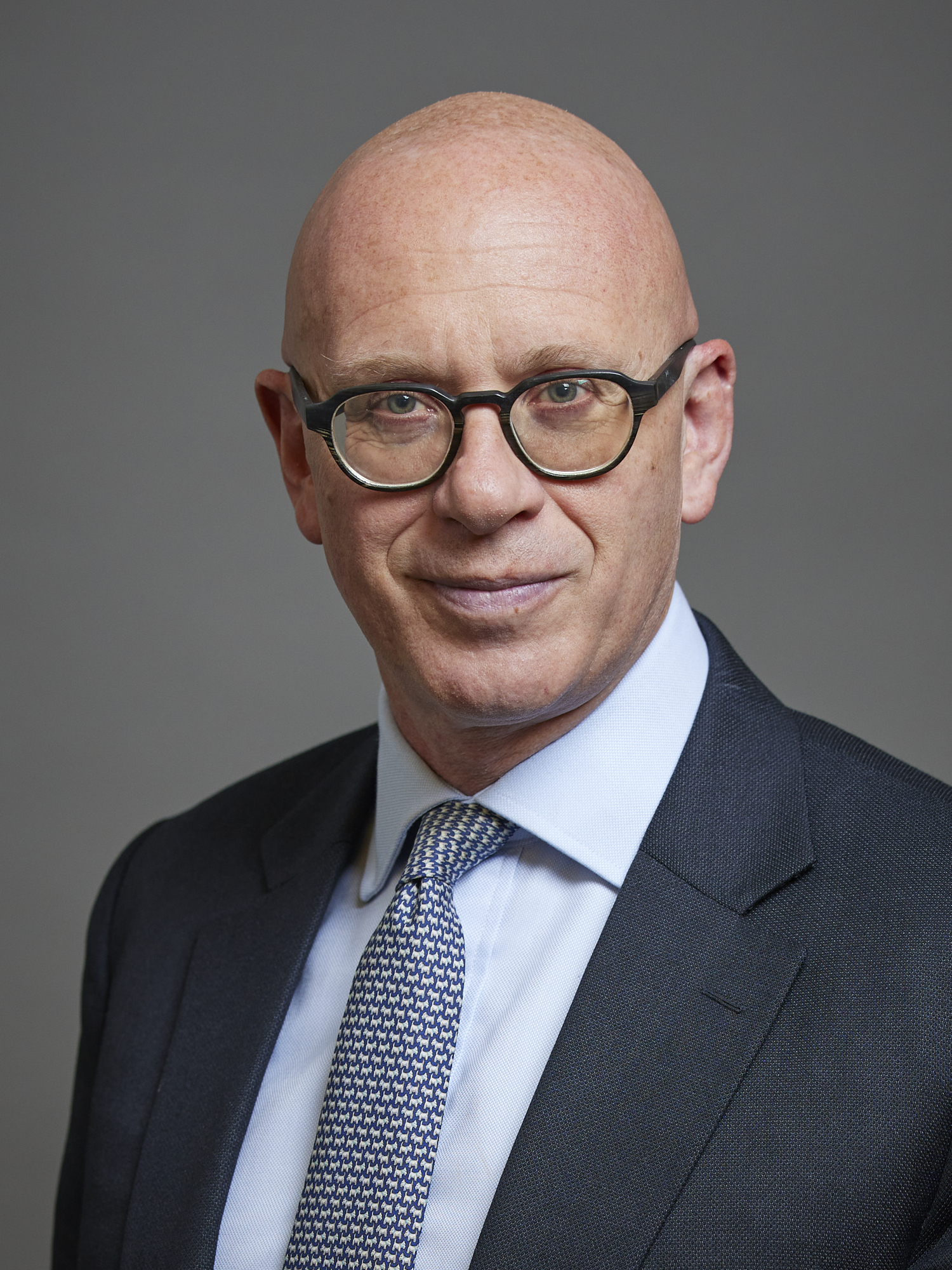
- Official portrait, 2022

Shadow Attorney General for England and Wales
- Incumbent
- Assumed office 6 November 2024
- Leader: Kemi Badenoch
- Preceded by: Jeremy Wright

Parliamentary Under-Secretary of State for Justice
- In office 22 December 2020 – 13 April 2022
- Prime Minister: Boris Johnson
- Preceded by: The Lord Keen of Elie (as Government Spokesperson for the Ministry of Justice)
- Succeeded by: The Lord Bellamy

Member of the House of Lords
- Lord Temporal
- Life peerage 30 December 2020

Personal details
- Born: 19 July 1968 (age 58) Liverpool, Lancashire, England
- Party: Conservative
- Spouse: Louise Wolfson (m. 1995)
- Children: 3
- Education: Selwyn College, Cambridge (MA (Cantab)); Inns of Court School of Law

David Wolfson, Baron Wolfson of Tredegar, KC (born 19 July 1968) is a British politician, barrister and life peer who has been Shadow Attorney General since November 2024 and is a member of the Welsh Conservatives. He was Parliamentary Under-Secretary of State for Justice from December 2020 to April 2022, when he resigned from the post after Prime Minister Boris Johnson and others were found to have broken COVID-related laws by attending parties.

== Early life and career ==
Born in Liverpool on 19 July 1968, Wolfson's great grandparents lived in Tredegar, Wales. Wolfson himself was educated in King David High School, Liverpool, and then spent a year at Yeshivat HaKotel in Jerusalem. He read Oriental studies and law at Selwyn College, Cambridge, graduating with a Bachelor of Arts (BA) degree in 1991. In accordance with the custom of the university, his BA was advanced to a Master of Arts (MA Cantab) degree in 1994. His father was a solicitor who later became a district judge; his mother attended university as a mature student and taught law in further education colleges.

He later attended the Inns of Court School of Law during when he was awarded an Inns of Court Scholarship. He was called to the bar at Inner Temple, one of the Inns of Court that had given him a Major Scholarship, in October 1992, where he remains, as of 2023, a bencher.

== Career outside politics ==
Wolfson practised in commercial law at One Essex Court in Temple, London.

Wolfson was instructed in many of the major banking and commercial disputes in recent years, and his practice extended over a broad range of commercial law, both in litigation and international arbitration. He also sat as an arbitrator in both domestic and international disputes. Wolfson says the high point of his career was convincing the Court of Appeal that a case that he successfully argued at the High Court five years prior was incorrectly decided.

Prior to joining the UK government, Wolfson was awarded Commercial Litigation Silk of the Year 2020 by The Legal 500, and also Commercial Litigation Silk of the Year in the Chambers UK Bar Awards 2020.

== In government ==
Wolfson was appointed Parliamentary Under-Secretary of State for Justice at the Ministry of Justice on 22 December 2020. He was later created Baron Wolfson of Tredegar, of Tredegar in the County of Gwent, on 30 December 2020, and was introduced to the House of Lords on 7 January 2021.

On 13 April 2022 Wolfson resigned from the government over Partygate after Boris Johnson and Rishi Sunak were fined. Wolfson stated the "scale, context and nature" of Government COVID breaches were "inconsistent with the rule of law". Wolfson claimed it would be wrong for "that conduct to pass with constitutional impunity, especially when many in society complied with the rules at great personal cost, and others were fined or prosecuted for similar, and sometimes apparently more trivial, offences." He maintained he had "no option" except resignation due to his "ministerial and professional obligations" in this field.

On 6 November 2024 Wolfson was appointed Shadow Attorney General for England and Wales by Conservative party leader Kemi Badenoch. On 30 December 2025, Wolfson was criticized for acting as a lawyer for sanctioned Russian billionaire Roman Abramovich by Justice Minister Jake Richards.

== Personal life ==
Wolfson is a practising Orthodox Jew. He married Louise in 1995, who is a former partner at Allen & Overy and currently runs a legal consultancy and occasionally sits as a tribunal judge. Together they have three children, Sam, Zara, and Abi.

When asked why he chose the Welsh town of Tredegar to appear in his title he said: "I thought it quite right to recognise the welcome which by and large these immigrants [my great grandparents] received [in Tredegar]."

Political offices
Office established	Parliamentary Under-Secretary of State for Justice; 2020–2022	Succeeded by Sir Christopher Bellamy
Orders of precedence in the United Kingdom
Preceded by The Lord Lebedev	Life Peer; Baron Wolfson of Tredegar	Followed by The Lord Hannan of Kingsclere
