= Herbert Laming, Baron Laming =

British social worker and politician (1936–2026)

The Right Honourable The Lord Laming CBE PC
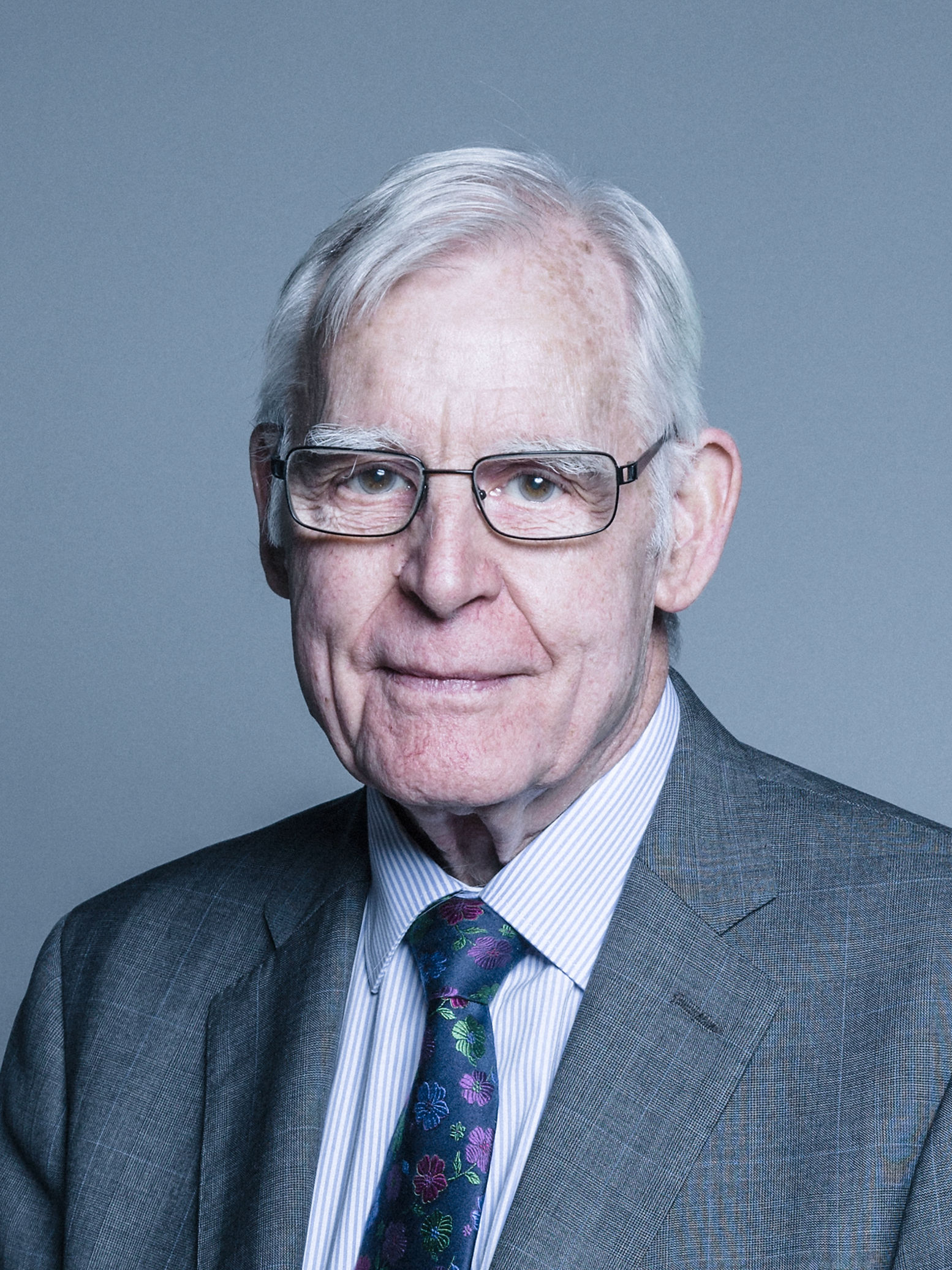
- Official portrait, 2018

Chairman of Committees
- In office 7 September 2015 – 31 August 2016
- Lord Speaker: The Baroness D'Souza
- Preceded by: The Lord Sewel
- Succeeded by: The Lord McFall of Alcluith (as Senior Deputy Speaker)

Convenor of the Crossbench Peers
- In office 5 September 2011 – 7 September 2015
- Preceded by: The Baroness D'Souza
- Succeeded by: The Lord Hope of Craighead

Member of the House of Lords
- Lord Temporal
- Life peerage 27 July 1998 – 15 July 2026

Personal details
- Born: 19 July 1936 Newcastle upon Tyne, England
- Died: 15 July 2026 (aged 89)
- Party: Crossbench
- Other political affiliations: Non-affiliated (2015–2016)
- Committees: Procedure Committee (2011–2026); Selection (2011–2026); Privileges (2011–2026); House (2011–2026); Liaison (2011–2026); Administration and Works (2011–2026)

William Herbert Laming, Baron Laming, CBE, PC (19 July 1936 – 15 July 2026) was a British social worker and member of the House of Lords. He served as Convenor of the Crossbench Peers from 2011 to 2015 and as Chairman of Committees from 2015 to 2016.

== Early life ==
William Herbert Laming was born in Newcastle upon Tyne on 19 July 1936. He studied Applied Social Studies at Durham University in 1960.

== Social work ==
Laming began work as a probation officer in Nottingham in 1961 and was later promoted to senior probation officer in 1966. In 1968 he was again promoted to assistant chief probation officer. He later worked as a psychiatric social worker, before moving to Hertfordshire County Council in 1971, becoming director of social services in 1975.

In 1990, his department was strongly criticised for its handling of a case that centred on allegations made to Hertfordshire social services by the father of a young girl who was concerned that his daughter was being sexually abused by her mother's boyfriend. The child was interviewed in front of her mother, a violation of official guidelines. Police and social services performed an overnight raid on his house and took his daughter to her mother and her mother's boyfriend. Laming denied him access to an internal inquiry report. In 1995, the Local Government Ombudsman made a finding of "maladministration with injustice" against the department.

He was Chief Inspector of the Social Services Inspectorate from 1991 until 1998. He has worked as an advisor to the Local Government Association, and was a past President of the Association of Directors of Social Services. He was involved with many social services organisations.

In the 1985 Birthday Honours, Laming was appointed a Commander of the Order of the British Empire (CBE). He was knighted in the 1996 Birthday Honours, and was created a life peer on 27 July 1998 as part of the 1998 Birthday Honours, taking his seat as Baron Laming, of Tewin in the county of Hertfordshire.

In 1999, he was given an honorary Doctor of Science by his old university, Durham.

In 2000, he was appointed head of the Harold Shipman inquiry, originally a private inquiry. However, relatives of Shipman's victims wanted a public inquiry, and they won a judicial review, forcing the inquiry to become public. Dame Janet Smith replaced Laming as the chairman. In the same year, he also investigated management in the prison service.

In 2001, he chaired the public inquiry into eight-year-old Victoria Climbié's death. Laming's appointment was controversial because of his previous post as head of Hertfordshire county council's social services department. The father of the daughter in the Hertfordshire case said, "I don't see how he has the qualifications or experience to be able to lead an investigation into another borough which has been failing to protect a child in exactly the same manner that his own authority failed to protect a child in 1990". Liberal Democrat spokesman Paul Burstow said, "the findings of the ombudsman in the Hertfordshire case must give rise to questions about Lord Laming's appointment to head this inquiry"; and Conservative Party spokesman Liam Fox said, "I think the government maybe should have thought twice about this and maybe, even yet, they will think again". The Department for Health, however, said that they were "fully confident that he is the right person to conduct the inquiry". His final report was published on 28 February 2003, and led to many child protection reforms. The report led to the formation of the Every Child Matters programme, a framework to improve the lives of children; the introduction of the Children Act 2004, an Act of Parliament that provides the legislative base for many of the reforms; the creation of ContactPoint, a database that will hold information on all children in England and Wales; and the creation of the post of children's commissioner, to co-ordinate efforts to improve child protection.

Lord Laming was appointed in November 2008 to investigate Britain's social services on a national basis following the death of Baby P. The subject caused heated arguments in the House of Commons between Gordon Brown and David Cameron forcing the Commons Speaker to intervene on a number of occasions to restore order.

In June 2011, Lord Laming was elected Convenor of the Crossbench Peers in the House of Lords, which office he left in September 2015, when he became the Chairman of Committees. He became a member of the Privy Council in June 2014.

== Views ==
Laming felt the quality of training for social workers needed to be reviewed. Laming also criticised cuts to funding for social services. Laming said, "The marked reduction in funding of local authorities in the last 10 years has had a real withdrawal from frontline services, and it's become something of a crisis service, rather than a preventative service. The whole organisation ought to focus on the frontline, on what’s happening to children, and making sure they intervene earlier rather than later and when it's too late."

== Death ==
Laming died on 15 July 2026, at the age of 89.

Parliament of the United Kingdom
Preceded by The Baroness D'Souza	Convenor of the Crossbench Peers; 2011–2015	Succeeded by The Lord Hope of Craighead
Preceded by The Lord Sewel	Chairman of Committees of the House of Lords; 2015–2016	Succeeded by The Lord McFall of Alcluith as Senior Deputy Speaker
