= Society of Portrait Sculptors =

British organisation of sculptors

The Society of Portrait Sculptors is a British organisation of sculptors "committed to making portrait and figurative sculpture accessible to a wider public". It holds an annual exhibition of some 70 sculptures, of which about two thirds are by its members and one third selected from submissions by non-members. It was founded in 1953, and among its founding members were Franta Belsky, Jacob Epstein, Dora Gordine, Josefina de Vasconcellos and Charles Wheeler.

The society is a registered charity, number 1046243.

The society awards the Belsky Award.
