= Non-affiliated members of the House of Lords =

British parliamentary designation

Non-affiliated members of the House of Lords are peers who do not belong to any parliamentary group in the House of Lords of the United Kingdom. They do not take a political party's whip, nor affiliate to the crossbench group, nor are they Lords Spiritual (active Church of England bishops). Formerly, the Lords of Appeal in Ordinary were also a separate affiliation, but due to the creation of the Supreme Court, were disqualified from sitting in the Lords until they no longer hold judicial office.

Most non-party Lords Temporal are crossbenchers. Peers may also be required to sit as non-affiliated while they hold certain senior positions within the Lords (e.g. the senior deputy speaker), as a means to preserve the neutrality of their official roles. Some members become non-affiliated after resigning or being expelled from a party, either through a political disagreement or after a scandal such as the 2009 parliamentary expenses scandal. Others have had no party allegiance and chose this designation rather than joining the crossbench.

A member who is elected as Lord Speaker must withdraw from any party affiliation, but is not considered to be a non-affiliated peer. Former lord speakers have sat as crossbenchers after holding office.

== Non-affiliated members ==
The UK Parliament website lists the following non-affiliated members of the House of Lords, including those not currently eligible to sit in the Lords:

Name	Prior affiliation	Reason for change
Lord Allan of Hallam	Liberal Democrats	
Baroness Altmann	Conservative	
Lord Austin of Dudley	Labour	Joined Lords without party affiliation
Lord Barwell	Conservative	
Lord Brennan	Labour	
Baroness Carr of Walton-on-the-Hill	None	Currently ineligible as Lady Chief Justice of England and Wales
Lord Cashman	Labour	Labour whip withdrawn following criticism of Rosie Duffield during her 2024 campaign for her Parliament seat
Baroness Chisholm of Owlpen	Conservative	
Lord Cooper of Windrush	Conservative	Suspended from Conservative whip after expressing support for Liberal Democrats in 2019 European Parliament elections
Lord Darzi of Denham	Labour	Resigned from Labour whip in July 2019 in protest of the party's response to antisemitism complaints
Lord Davies of Abersoch	Labour	
Lord Docherty of Milngavie	Labour	Suspended from Labour whip pending investigation into sexual allegations during his tenure as chief executive of NCG.
Lord Doyle	Labour	
Lord Evans of Watford	Labour	Labour whip removed upon suspension from the House in connection with lobbying scandal
Lord Faulks	Conservative	
Baroness Foster of Aghadrumsee	DUP	Joined Lords without party affiliation
Baroness Fox of Buckley	Brexit Party	Joined Lords without party affiliation
Lord Frost	Conservative	Withdrew from Conservative whip to serve as director general of Institute of Economic Affairs
Lord Gadhia	Conservative	
Lord Hannan of Kingsclere	Conservative	
Lord Harrington of Watford	Conservative	
Lord Hobby	Labour	Joined Lords without party affiliation
Baroness Hoey	Labour	Joined Lords without party affiliation
Baroness Lampard	Conservative	
Lord Lancaster of Kimbolton	Conservative	Assistant Chief of the Defence Staff (Reserves and Cadets)
Baroness Longfield	Labour	Withdrew from Labour whip upon appointment as chair of Independent Inquiry into Grooming Gangs
Lord Lupton	Conservative	
Baroness McGregor-Smith	Conservative	
Lord Mackenzie of Framwellgate	Labour	Following return from suspension from the House in connection with lobbying scandal
Baroness Mone	Conservative	
Lord Moore of Etchingham	None	Joined Lords without party affiliation
Baroness Morgan of Cotes	Conservative	
Baroness Moyo	Conservative	
Lord Paddick	Liberal Democrats	Withdrew from Liberal Democrat whip during his advisory role with the Metropolitan Police
Lord Patel of Bradford	Labour	
Lord Pearson of Rannoch	UKIP	Resigned UKIP whip in protest of party leadership during Brexit negotiations
Lord Ponsonby of Shulbrede	Labour	Senior Deputy Speaker of the House of Lords (2026–present)
Lord Rosenfield	None	Joined Lords without party affiliation
Lord Taylor of Warwick	Conservative	Following return from suspension from the House in connection with expenses scandal and imprisonment for false accounting
Lord Truscott	Labour	Resigned Labour whip following the "cash for influence" allegations of 2009
Lord Tyrie	Conservative	Entered the House without affiliation due to his role as Chairman of the Competition and Markets Authority
Baroness Uddin	Labour	Following return from suspension from the House in connection with expenses scandal
Baroness Vadera	Labour	
Lord Verdirame	None	Joined Lords without party affiliation
Baroness Warsi	Conservative	
Lord Wasserman	Conservative	
Baroness Young of Old Scone	Labour	Appointed as Forestry Commission chair

== Independent members ==
There are other peers who list themselves as Independent within the House of Lords:

Name	Prior affiliation	Designation	Notes
Lord Maginnis of Drumglass	UUP	Independent Ulster Unionist	Resigned from party whip following homophobic remarks. Currently suspended from the Lords
Lord Stevens of Ludgate	UKIP	Conservative Independent	Expelled from Conservative whip in 2004 for supporting UKIP, sat as Conservative Independent until 2012

== See also ==
- List of current members of the House of Lords
