= John Sewel, Baron Sewel =

British politician and academic (born 1946)

The Right Honourable The Lord Sewel CBE

Chairman of Committees
- In office 9 May 2012 – 26 July 2015
- Lord Speaker: The Baroness D'Souza
- Preceded by: The Lord Brabazon of Tara
- Succeeded by: The Lord Laming

Member of the House of Lords
- Lord Temporal
- Life peerage 10 January 1996 – 30 July 2015

Personal details
- Born: John Buttifant Sewel; 15 January 1946 (age 80)
- Party: Labour (until 2015); Non-affiliated (2015)
- Spouses: Rosemary Langeland (m. 1968–1986) Leonora Harding (m. 1988–2002) Jennifer Lindsay (m. 2005)
- Children: 2
- Education: Durham University; University College of Wales, Swansea; University of Aberdeen

John Buttifant Sewel, Baron Sewel, CBE (/ˈsuːwəl/; born 15 January 1946), is a British politician, life peer, and former academic. He served as Chairman of Committees of the House of Lords, its deputy speaker. He is also a former senior vice principal of the University of Aberdeen and a former parliamentary under-secretary of state.

He was made a Labour minister in the Scottish Office department of the Blair Government as Parliamentary Under-Secretary of State for Scotland in 1997, where he assisted Donald Dewar in steering through the legislation that led to the creation of the Scottish Parliament. His name is given to the Sewel motion, parliamentary device passed by the Scottish Parliament, in which it agrees that the United Kingdom parliament may pass legislation on a devolved issue extending to Scotland, over which the Scottish Parliament has regular legislative authority. He left ministerial office in 1999 upon the new Parliament taking over the majority of the Scottish Office's functions. Sewel left the House of Lords in 2015 after photos of him taking drugs with prostitutes emerged.

== Early life ==
Sewel was born on 15 January 1946. He was educated at Hanson Boys' Grammar School and Durham University (BA, 1967) before taking his MSc degree at University College of Wales, Swansea in 1970, and a PhD from the University of Aberdeen in 1977.

== Academic career ==
Sewel joined the University of Aberdeen as a research fellow in the Department of Politics in 1969. During the next three decades he worked in the Departments of Education and Political Economy and also the Regional Centre for the Study of Economic and Social Policy, where he was appointed to his chair. In 1988 he became the dean of the then Faculty of Economic & Social Sciences. Subsequently, in 1995, he was appointed vice-principal and dean of the faculty of Social Sciences & Law.

Sewel returned to the University of Aberdeen to resume his role as vice-principal in 1999 and was subsequently senior vice-principal from 2001 to 2004.

== Political career ==
Sewel was first elected to political office as an Aberdeen District Councillor in 1974, serving as council leader from 1977 to 1980, and also as president of the Convention of Scottish Local Authorities from 1982 to 1984. Sewel was appointed a Commander of the Order of the British Empire (CBE) in the 1984 New Year Honours. Later, he was an influential member of the Scottish Constitutional Convention from 1994 to 1995.

On 10 January 1996 he was created Baron Sewel, of Gilcomstoun in the District of the City of Aberdeen, and became Parliamentary Under-Secretary of State at the Scottish Office from 1997 to 1999, serving as the Minister for Agriculture, Environment and Fisheries. As such he piloted the Scotland Act 1998 through Parliament and helped draft the plans for the new Scottish Parliament. At the first election to the Parliament, Sewel was a candidate as third on the Labour Party list for North East Scotland, but was not elected.

As an active member of the House of Lords, Sewel chaired the European Union Select Committee in Agriculture, the Environment and Fisheries and was a member of the NATO Parliamentary Assembly. His interests include enlargement of the European Union and of NATO, constitutional change and rural development.

Sewel was elected Chairman of Committees on 9 May 2012, whereupon he gave up the Labour whip and sat as a non-affiliated member in the House of Lords.

=== Scandal and resignation ===
He resigned as Chairman of Committees on 26 July 2015 after The Sun released hidden camera footage seemingly showing him snorting white powder (widely reported in the media to be cocaine) at a party with prostitutes. In the same video he described David Cameron as the "most superficial [and] facile Prime Minister there has ever been". On the following day he was granted a leave of absence from the Lords, and on 28 July 2015 he formally resigned from the House of Lords.

Parliament of the United Kingdom
Preceded by The Lord Brabazon of Tara	Chairman of Committees of the House of Lords; 2012–2015	Succeeded by The Lord Laming
Orders of precedence in the United Kingdom
Preceded by The Lord McNally	Gentlemen; Baron Sewel	Followed by The Lord Harris of Peckham
