= John Gardiner, Baron Gardiner of Kimble =

British peer (born 1956)

The Right Honourable The Lord Gardiner of Kimble
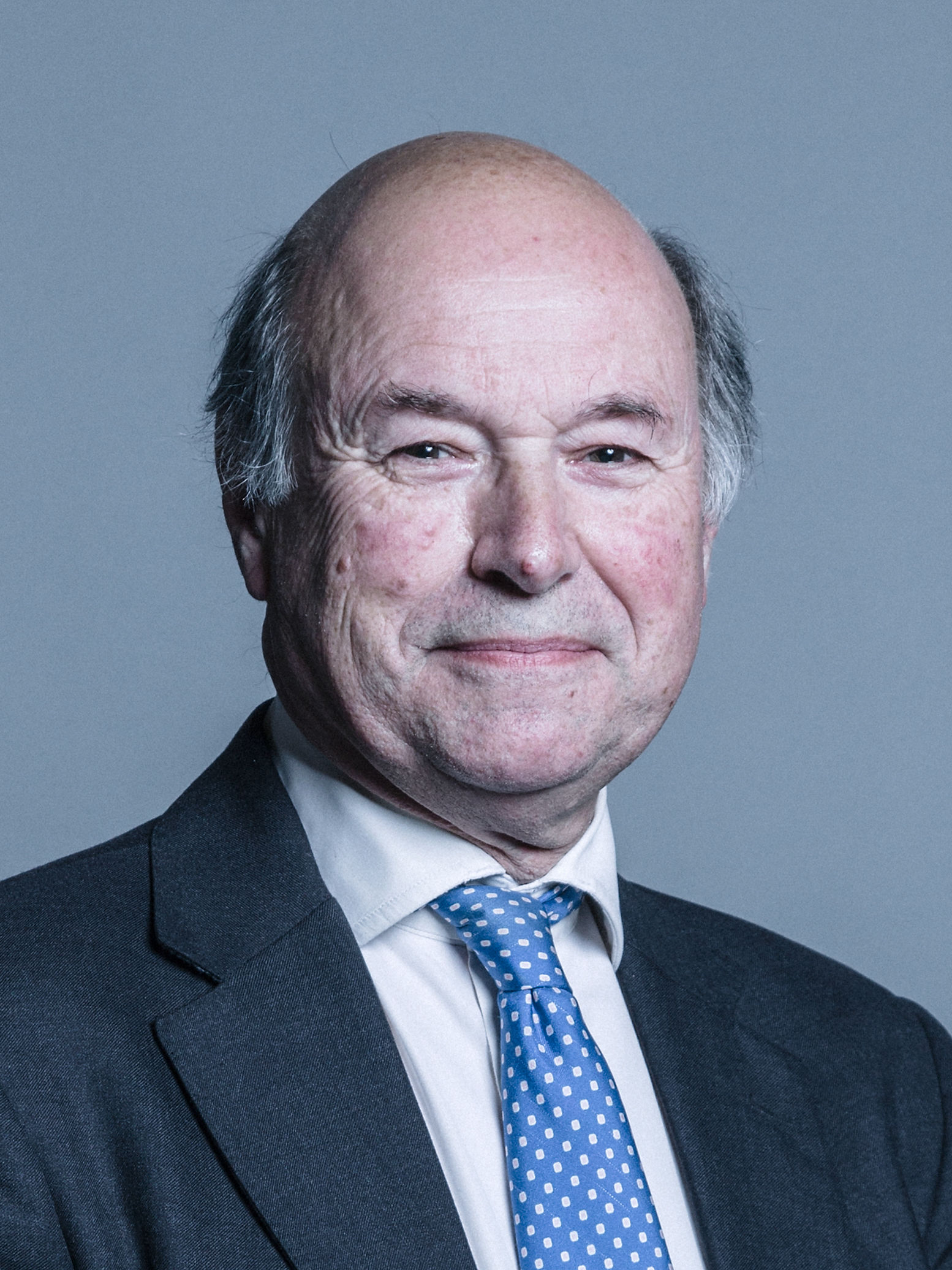

Senior Deputy Speaker of the House of Lords
- In office 11 May 2021 – 12 May 2026
- Lord Speaker: The Lord McFall of Alcluith; The Lord Forsyth of Drumlean
- Preceded by: The Lord McFall of Alcluith
- Succeeded by: The Lord Ponsonby of Shulbrede

Parliamentary Under-Secretary of State for Rural Affairs and Biosecurity
- In office 13 July 2016 – 10 May 2021
- Prime Minister: Theresa May; Boris Johnson
- Preceded by: Rory Stewart
- Succeeded by: The Lord Benyon

Deputy Chief Whip of the House of Lords Captain of the Yeomen of the Guard
- In office 8 May 2015 – 13 July 2016
- Prime Minister: David Cameron
- Preceded by: The Lord Newby
- Succeeded by: The Earl of Courtown

Lord-in-waiting Government Whip
- In office 4 September 2012 – 8 May 2015
- Prime Minister: David Cameron
- Preceded by: The Baroness Rawlings
- Succeeded by: Vacant

Member of the House of Lords
- Lord Temporal
- Life peerage 23 June 2010

Personal details
- Born: 17 March 1956 (age 70)
- Party: Conservative (until 2021; from 2026)
- Other political affiliations: Non-affiliated (2021–2026)
- Spouse: Olivia Musgrave
- Education: Uppingham School; Royal Holloway, University of London

John Gardiner, Baron Gardiner of Kimble (born 17 March 1956), is a British politician. He is a life peer and served as Senior Deputy Speaker of the House of Lords from May 2021 to May 2026.

== Early life, education and early career ==
Educated at Uppingham School and Royal Holloway, University of London, he graduated with a BA in Modern History, Economic History and Politics in 1977. He served as private secretary to five successive Chairmen of the Conservative Party between 1989 and 1995, under Prime Ministers Margaret Thatcher and John Major. He has also worked as Director of Political Affairs for the Countryside Alliance, and served on the Quality of Life Commission Rural Affairs Group of the Conservative Party.

== House of Lords ==
On 23 June 2010, Gardiner was raised to the peerage as Baron Gardiner of Kimble, of Kimble in the County of Buckinghamshire.

In 2012, he was appointed a Lord-in-waiting, and served in the Lords as a government whip and spokesman on the Cabinet Office, Business, Innovation and Skills, and Energy and Climate Change.

In May 2015, Gardiner was promoted to be Captain of the Yeomen of the Guard and Government Deputy Chief Whip in the House of Lords.

In July 2016, he was moved by new Prime Minister Theresa May to be Parliamentary Under-Secretary of State for Rural Affairs and Biosecurity at the Department for Environment, Food and Rural Affairs. He served in this role until 10 May 2021.

On 11 May 2021, Gardiner was appointed as Senior Deputy Speaker of the House of Lords.

He is married to the sculptor Olivia Musgrave. He lives in London and Suffolk and is a partner of the family farm at Kimble in Buckinghamshire. He was Chairman of the Vale of Aylesbury with Garth and South Berks Hunt from 1992 to 2006 and President of the Buckinghamshire County Show 2007.

== Arms ==
Coat of arms of John Gardiner, Baron Gardiner of Kimble
Crest In front of a garb Or a foxhound statant Proper supporting with the dexter foreleg a banner of the arms on a staff Gules. Escutcheon Argent on a chevron engrailed Vert between three foxes courant Proper three Dairy Shorthorns statant Or on a chief Gules three swans wings elevated and addorsed Argent. Supporters On either side a griffin Argent the tail tufted Or murally gorged Gules winged Vert the exterior foreclaws grasping an annulet the interior forefoot resting on a grice of three steps Or. Motto Floreat Rus

Political offices
Preceded by The Lord Newby	Deputy Government Chief Whip in the House of Lords; 2015–2016	Succeeded by The Earl of Courtown
Preceded by The Lord Newby	Captain of the Yeomen of the Guard; 2015–2016	Succeeded by The Earl of Courtown
Preceded by Rory Stewart	Parliamentary Under-Secretary of State for Rural Affairs and Biosecurity; 2016–2021	Succeeded by The Lord Benyon
Preceded by The Lord McFall of Alcluith	Senior Deputy Speaker of the House of Lords; 2021–2026	Succeeded by The Lord Ponsonby of Shulbrede
Orders of precedence in the United Kingdom
Preceded by The Lord Knight of Weymouth	Gentlemen; Baron Gardiner of Kimble	Followed by The Lord German
