= Ivon Moore-Brabazon, 3rd Baron Brabazon of Tara =

British Conservative politician (born 1946)

The Right Honourable The Lord Brabazon of Tara PC DL
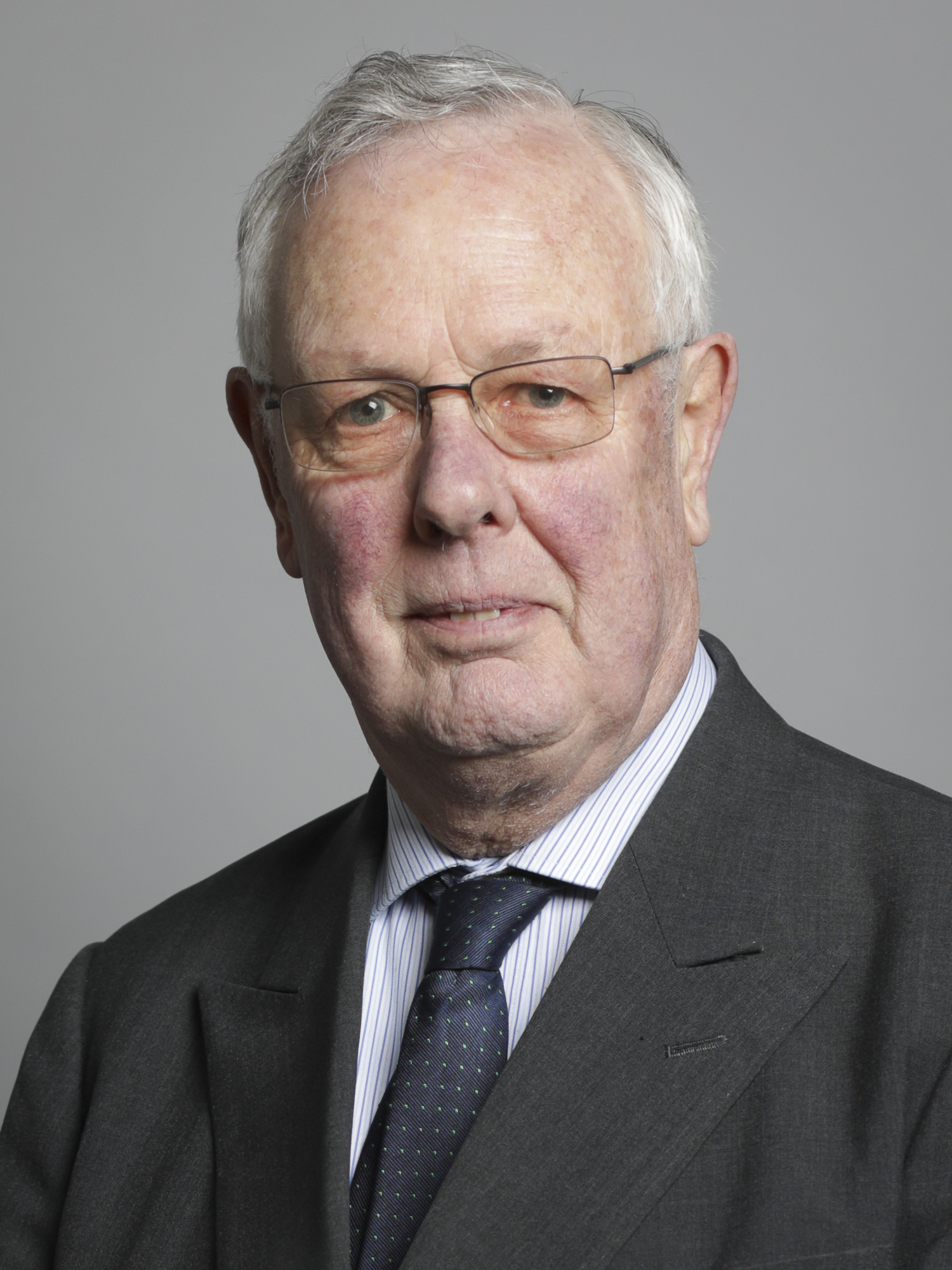
- Official portrait, 2020

Chairman of Committees
- In office 13 November 2002 – 1 May 2012
- Preceded by: The Lord Tordoff
- Succeeded by: The Lord Sewel

Principal Deputy Chairman of Committees
- In office 20 June 2001 – 13 November 2002
- Preceded by: The Lord Tordoff
- Succeeded by: The Lord Grenfell

Minister of State for Transport
- In office 23 July 1990 – 14 April 1992
- Prime Minister: Margaret Thatcher
- Preceded by: Michael Portillo
- Succeeded by: The Earl of Caithness

Minister of State for Foreign and Commonwealth Affairs
- In office 24 July 1989 – 14 July 1990
- Prime Minister: Margaret Thatcher
- Preceded by: The Lord Glenarthur
- Succeeded by: The Earl of Caithness

Parliamentary Under-Secretary of State for Transport
- In office 10 September 1986 – 23 July 1989
- Prime Minister: Margaret Thatcher
- Preceded by: The Earl of Caithness
- Succeeded by: Robert Atkins

Lord-in-waiting Government Whip
- In office 19 September 1984 – 10 September 1986
- Prime Minister: Margaret Thatcher
- Preceded by: The Lord Lucas of Chilworth

Member of the House of Lords
- Lord Temporal
- Hereditary peerage 24 September 1976 – 11 November 1999
- Preceded by: The 2nd Baron Brabazon of Tara
- Succeeded by: Seat abolished
- Elected Hereditary Peer; 11 November 1999 – 28 April 2022
- Election: 1999
- Preceded by: Seat established
- Succeeded by: The 4th Baron Remnant

Personal details
- Born: Ivon Anthony Moore-Brabazon; 20 December 1946 (age 79)
- Party: Conservative
- Other political affiliations: Non-affiliated (2001–2012)

Ivon Anthony Moore-Brabazon, 3rd Baron Brabazon of Tara, PC DL (born 20 December 1946), is a British Conservative politician.

== Early life ==
Lord Brabazon attended Harrow School. He married Harriet Frances de Courcy Hamilton in 1979, with whom he had a son and a daughter. He has worked in the London Stock Exchange and the freight industry.

== Political career ==
=== House of Lords ===
He sat in the House of Lords as a Conservative and from 1984 to 1986 was a House of Lords whip in Margaret Thatcher's government. He then became a Parliamentary Under Secretary of State at the Department of Transport, holding that post until 1989. Lord Brabazon was then made a Minister of State at the Foreign and Commonwealth Office. In early 1990, he returned to the Department of Transport as Minister of State, holding that post until leaving office at the 1992 general election.

=== House of Lords Act 1999 ===
With the passage of the House of Lords Act 1999, Brabazon along with almost all other hereditary peers lost his automatic right to sit in the House of Lords. He was, however, elected as one of the 90 elected hereditary peers to remain in the House of Lords pending completion of House of Lords reform.

In 2001, he was elected Principal Deputy Chairman of Committees, and as a result resigned the Conservative whip and became a non-affiliated member of the House of Lords. This means that he is not associated with any party or with the Crossbenchers. He was the Chairman of Committees from 2002 to 2012, at which point he retook the Conservative whip.

Lord Brabazon is a Deputy Lieutenant of the Isle of Wight.

== Marriage and children ==
He married Harriet Frances Hamilton, daughter of Mervyn Peter de Courcy Hamilton, on 8 September 1979. They have one son and one daughter:

- Benjamin Ralph Moore-Brabazon (b. 15 March 1983), studied economics at Durham University (2002–2005); an investment manager with Brewin Dolphin Married to Molly (née Parish)
  - Max George Moore-Brabazon (b. 23 March 2015)
  - Felix Theodore Reggie Moore-Brabazon (b. 17 May 2017)
- Anabel Mary Moore-Brabazon (born 1985), in-house solicitor at Burberry

Parliament of the United Kingdom
Preceded by The Lord Tordoff	Chairman of Committees of the House of Lords; 2002–2012	Succeeded by The Lord Sewel
New office created by the House of Lords Act 1999	Elected hereditary peer to the House of Lords under the House of Lords Act 1999; 1999–2022	Succeeded by The Lord Remnant
Peerage of the United Kingdom
Preceded by Derek Moore-Brabazon	Baron Brabazon of Tara; 1974–present Member of the House of Lords (1976–1999)	Incumbent; Heir apparent: Benjamin Moore-Brabazon
