= Senior Deputy Speaker of the House of Lords =

Senior officer of the UK House of Lords

- Logo used to represent the House of Lords

- Flag of the House of Lords

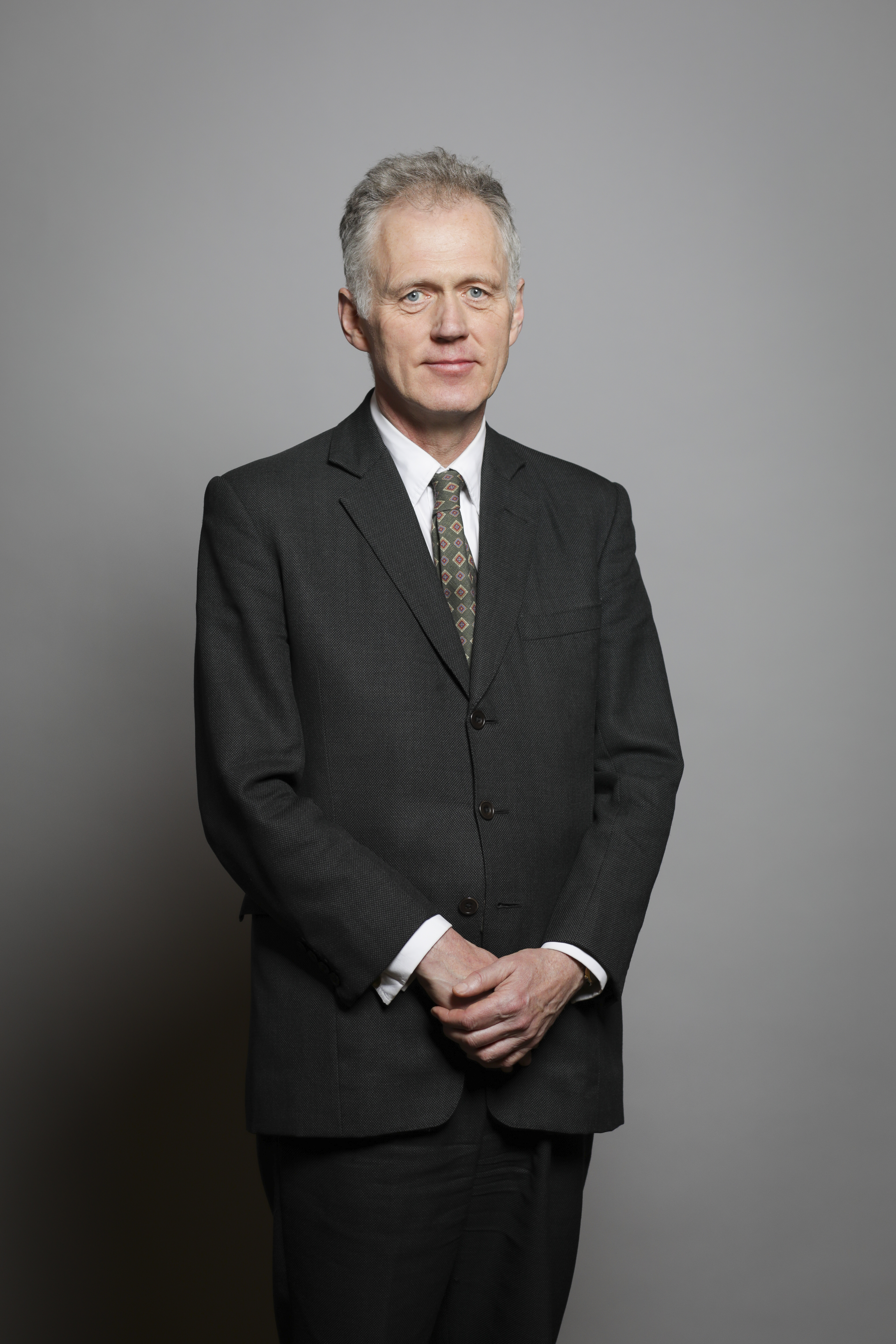
- Incumbent; The Lord Ponsonby of Shulbrede since 13 May 2026
- House of Lords
- Style: Senior Deputy Speaker (informal and within the house); His or her own peerage title
- Status: Deputy presiding officer
- Appointer: House of Lords; Approved and sworn in by the Sovereign
- Website: Official website

The senior deputy speaker is an officer of the House of Lords whose main role is to preside over the house when it is in committee (i.e., considering a bill at committee stage), either in the Lords Chamber or in Grand Committee, which is when committee stage is taken away from the floor to free up debating time in the main chamber. The senior deputy speaker deputises for the lord speaker, and like the lord speaker withdraws from political party membership. Additionally, the senior deputy speaker chairs various select committees of the house, and has a role in the administration of the house.

The current incumbent, Frederick Ponsonby, 4th Baron Ponsonby of Shulbrede, took the office on 13 May 2026. Up until September 2016 the position was known as chairman of committees.

The senior deputy speaker is assisted by a panel of deputy chairmen of committees. In addition to taking the chair in Committee of the Whole House and Grand Committee, deputy chairmen are appointed from time to time to serve with the chairman of committees on unopposed bill committees, which scrutinise private bills against which no petitions have been lodged. Deputy chairmen are, by practice, deputy speakers.

In March 2020, the Lord Speaker, Lord Fowler, announced that, due to the coronavirus pandemic, he would be withdrawing from Westminster and leaving woolsack duties to his deputies. On 23 March the house agreed to a motion that, until 21 July, any member could perform the deputy speakers' functions.

== List of holders ==
=== Chairmen of committees (1715–2016) ===
- Edward Hyde, 3rd Earl of Clarendon, 1715–1723
- John West, 7th/16th Baron De La Warr, 1724–1733
- Edward Rich, 8th Earl of Warwick, 1733–1759
- Hugh Willoughby, 15th Baron Willoughby of Parham, 1759–1765
- Nathaniel Booth, 4th Baron Delamer, 1765–1770
- Edward Noel, 1st Viscount Wentworth, 1770–1774
- William Irby, 1st Baron Boston, 1774–1775
- Nathaniel Curzon, 1st Baron Scarsdale, 1775–1789
- William Cathcart, 9th Lord Cathcart, 1789–1794
- Thomas de Grey, 2nd Baron Walsingham, 1794–1814
- Cropley Ashley-Cooper, 6th Earl of Shaftesbury, 1814–1851
- John Freeman-Mitford, 2nd Baron Redesdale, 1851–1886 (created Earl of Redesdale, 1877)
- Richard Grenville, 3rd Duke of Buckingham and Chandos, 1886–1889
- Albert Parker, 3rd Earl of Morley, 1889–1905
- William Onslow, 4th Earl of Onslow, 1905–1911
- Richard Hely-Hutchinson, 6th Earl of Donoughmore, 1911–1931
- Richard Onslow, 5th Earl of Onslow, 1931–1944
- George Hamilton-Gordon, 2nd Baron Stanmore, 1944–1946
- Henry Moore, 10th Earl of Drogheda, 1946–1957
- William Lewis, 3rd Baron Merthyr, 1957–1965
- William Hare, 5th Earl of Listowel, 1965–1976
- Morys Bruce, 4th Baron Aberdare, 1976–1992
- Geoffrey Russell, 4th Baron Ampthill, 1992–1994
- Terence Boston, Baron Boston of Faversham, 1994–2000
- John MacKay, Baron MacKay of Ardbrecknish, 2000–2001
- Geoffrey Tordoff, Baron Tordoff, 2001–2002
- Ivon Moore-Brabazon, 3rd Baron Brabazon of Tara, 2002–2012
- John Sewel, Baron Sewel, 2012–2015
- Herbert Laming, Baron Laming, 2015–2016

=== Senior deputy speakers (2016–present) ===
- John McFall, Baron McFall of Alcluith, 2016–2021
- John Gardiner, Baron Gardiner of Kimble, 2021–2026
- Frederick Ponsonby, 4th Baron Ponsonby of Shulbrede, 2026–present

== Deputies ==
The following table lists the panel of deputy chairmen of committees, along with their concurrent terms as deputy speaker, as of June 2026.

Peer	Party	Deputy Chair start	Deputy Speaker start
Baroness Barker	Liberal Democrat	July 2020	April 2024
Lord Bates	Conservative	June 2026	–
Lord Beith	Liberal Democrat	May 2022	April 2024
Baroness Brown of Silvertown	Labour	June 2026	–
Baroness Bull	Crossbench	May 2022	April 2024
Viscount Colville of Culross (Note: Viscount Colville of Culross previously served as Deputy Chairman of Committees (from June 2023) and as Deputy Speaker (from April 2024) until April 2026.)	Crossbench	June 2026	–
Lord Duncan of Springbank	Conservative	April 2020	April 2024
Lord Faulkner of Worcester	Labour	November 2007	December 2008
Baroness Finlay of Llandaff	Crossbench	November 2017	March 2018
Baroness Fookes	Conservative	May 2002	December 2002
Baroness Garden of Frognal	Liberal Democrat	June 2015	March 2018
Lord Gardiner of Kimble (Note: Lord Gardiner of Kimble previously served as Senior Deputy Speaker from May 2021 to May 2026.)	Conservative	June 2026	–
Lord Goddard of Stockport	Liberal Democrat	June 2026	–
Baroness Healy of Primrose Hill	Labour	July 2020	April 2024
Lord Hogan-Howe	Crossbench	March 2026	–
Baroness Hunt of Bethnal Green	Crossbench	June 2026	–
Baroness Kennedy of Cradley	Labour	May 2022	April 2024
Lord Kennedy of Southwark	Labour	June 2021	April 2024
Earl of Kinnoull	Crossbench	January 2020	April 2024
Lord Kirkhope of Harrogate	Conservative	June 2026	–
Baroness Laing of Elderslie	Conservative	March 2026	–
Lord Lexden	Conservative	November 2017	March 2018
Baroness McIntosh of Hudnall	Labour	November 2007	December 2008
Baroness Morgan of Drefelin	Labour	July 2025	–
Baroness Morris of Bolton	Conservative	June 2010	November 2010
Baroness Nichols of Selby	Labour	June 2026	–
Baroness Pitkeathley	Labour	November 2002	December 2002
Lord Russell of Liverpool (Note: Lord Russell of Liverpool previously served as Deputy Chairman of Committees (from April 2020) and as Deputy Speaker (from April 2024) until April 2026.)	Crossbench	June 2026	–
Baroness Scott of Needham Market	Liberal Democrat	June 2023	April 2024
Lord Vaux of Harrowden	Crossbench	June 2026	–
Baroness Watkins of Tavistock	Crossbench	July 2020	April 2024
Baroness Williams of Trafford	Conservative	October 2022	April 2024
Lord Young of Cookham	Conservative	May 2022	April 2024

== See also ==
- Parliamentary committees of the United Kingdom
- Chairman of Ways and Means – Equivalent in the lower house
