= Frederick Ponsonby, 4th Baron Ponsonby of Shulbrede =

British peer and politician (born 1958)

The Right Honourable The Lord Ponsonby of Shulbrede JP
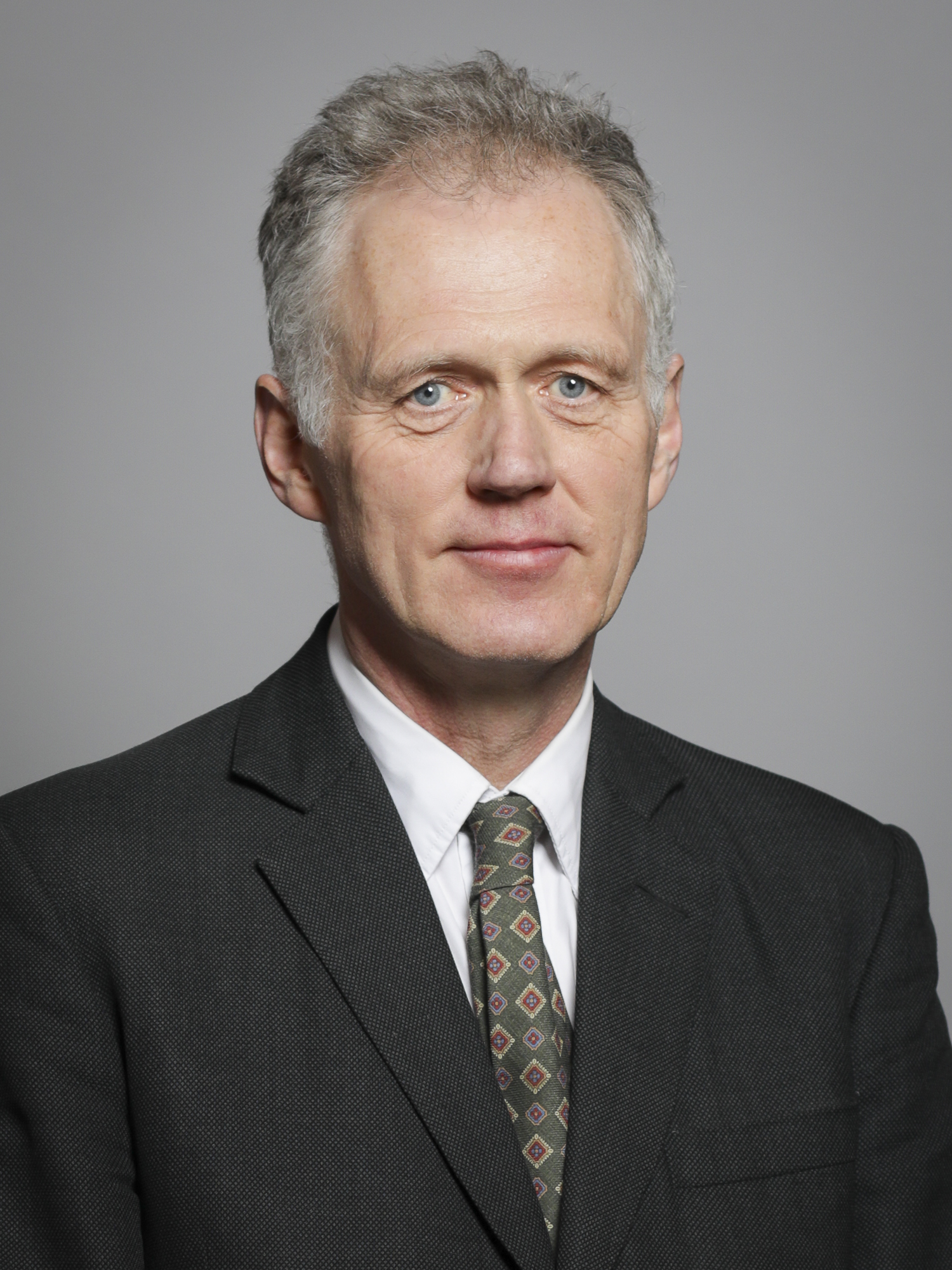
- Official portrait, 2019

Senior Deputy Speaker of the House of Lords
- Incumbent
- Assumed office 13 May 2026
- Lord Speaker: The Lord Forsyth of Drumlean
- Preceded by: The Lord Gardiner of Kimble

Parliamentary Under-Secretary of State for Justice
- In office 9 July 2024 – 6 September 2025
- Prime Minister: Keir Starmer
- Preceded by: The Lord Bellamy
- Succeeded by: The Baroness Levitt

Member of the House of Lords
- Lord Temporal
- Life peerage 19 April 2000
- Hereditary peerage 13 June 1990 – 11 November 1999
- Preceded by: The 3rd Baron Ponsonby of Shulbrede
- Succeeded by: Seat abolished

Personal details
- Born: Frederick Matthew Thomas Ponsonby; 27 October 1958 (age 68)
- Party: Non-affiliated
- Other political affiliations: Labour (until 2026)
- Relations: Ponsonby family
- Parents: Thomas Ponsonby, 3rd Baron Ponsonby of Shulbrede; Ursula Fox-Pitt

Frederick Matthew Thomas Ponsonby, 4th Baron Ponsonby of Shulbrede, Baron Ponsonby of Roehampton (born 27 October 1958), is a British peer and politician. He was appointed Senior Deputy Speaker of the House of Lords on 13 May 2026 and previously served as Parliamentary Under-Secretary of State for Justice from 2024 to 2025.

== Early life and education ==
The only son of Thomas Ponsonby, 3rd Baron Ponsonby of Shulbrede, and Ursula née Fox-Pitt, he attended Holland Park School, before studying Physics at Cardiff University, graduating BSc 1980. He then pursued post-graduate studies in Engineering at Imperial College London, CEng 1997.

Lord Ponsonby was elected a Fellow of the Institute of Materials, Minerals and Mining (FIMMM) in 1996.

== Political career ==
Succeeding as Baron Ponsonby of Shulbrede upon his father's death in 1990, he took his seat in the House of Lords as a hereditary peer in 1991, sitting on the Labour benches.

Lord Ponsonby represented Roehampton Ward as a councillor on Wandsworth London Borough Council from 1990 to 1994.

Along with all but 92 of his fellow hereditary peers, Lord Ponsonby was ejected from the upper house following the enactment of the House of Lords Act 1999. Having sat on the Lords Opposition frontbench as a spokesman on Education from 1992–1997 as well as on various parliamentary sub-committees, in 2000 he was created a life peer, in addition to his hereditary title, as Baron Ponsonby of Roehampton, of Shulbrede in the County of West Sussex, which meant he could resume sitting in the House of Lords.

Having served as an Opposition spokesperson for Justice from April 2020 and Home Affairs from May 2021, on 9 July 2024, Ponsonby was appointed Parliamentary Under-Secretary of State for Justice and as a Lord-in-Waiting.

A justice of the peace (JP) for Westminster since 2006, Ponsonby was admitted as a Freeman of the City of London in 2024.

== Family ==
On 5 July 1995, he married Sarah Catriona Pilkington Jackson OBE (born 1957), former chief executive of the charity Working Families, and daughter of Richard d'Orville Pilkington Jackson (1921–2008).

Lord and Lady Ponsonby live in London and have two children:

- The Hon. Eve Ponsonby (born 1991), an actress;
- The Hon. Cameron Ponsonby (born 1995), educated at University of Southampton (BSc) and City, University of London (MA), a sports journalist and heir apparent to the hereditary barony.

== Arms ==
Coat of arms of Frederick Ponsonby, 4th Baron Ponsonby of Shulbrede
Coronet That of a Baron Crest Out of a Ducal Coronet Azure three Arrows, point downwards, one in pale and two in saltire, entwined at the intersection by a Snake Proper Escutcheon Gules a Chevron between three Combs Argent Motto Pro Rege Lege Grege (For The King, The Law, And The People)

== Sources ==
- Profile at Parliament of the United Kingdom

Political offices
Preceded by The Lord Bellamy	Parliamentary Under-Secretary of State for Justice; 2024–2025	Succeeded by The Baroness Levitt
Preceded by The Lord Gardiner of Kimble	Senior Deputy Speaker of the House of Lords; 2026–present	Incumbent
Peerage of the United Kingdom
Preceded by Thomas Ponsonby	Baron Ponsonby of Shulbrede; 1990–present Member of the House of Lords (1990–1999)	Incumbent; Heir apparent: Hon. Cameron Ponsonby
Orders of precedence in the United Kingdom
Preceded by The Lord Baden-Powell	Gentlemen as Baron Ponsonby of Shulbrede	Followed by The Lord Dickinson
