= Hay Head Quarry =

Site of Special Scientific Interest in the West Midlands

Coordinates: 52.58609°N 1.93059°W

- Site of Special Scientific Interest
- Location of Hay Head Quarry.
- Area of search: West Midlands
- Grid reference: SP048987
- Interest: Geological
- Area: 5.8 ha (14 acres)
- Notification date: 1986
- Location map: English Nature

Hay Head Quarry (grid reference SP048987) is a 5.8 hectares (14 acres) geological site of Special Scientific Interest in the West Midlands. The site was notified in 1986 under the Wildlife and Countryside Act 1981 and is currently managed by the Country Trust.

== See also ==
- List of Sites of Special Scientific Interest in the West Midlands
