= Regulatory Reform (Execution of Deeds and Documents) Order 2005 =

Act of the Parliament of the United Kingdom

Regulatory Reform (Execution of Deeds and Documents) Order 2005 (Note: Section 12(1).)
- Statutory Instrument
- Parliament of the United Kingdom
- Citation: SI 2005/1906
- Territorial extent: England and Wales (Note: Section 12(3).)

Dates
- Made: 23 June 2005
- Commencement: 15 September 2005 (Note: Section 12(2).)

Other legislation
- Amends: Law of Property Act 1925; Powers of Attorney Act 1971; Companies Act 1985; Law of Property (Miscellaneous Provisions) Act 1989; Land Registration Act 2002
- Made under: Regulatory Reform Act 2001

Status: Current legislation

Text of statute as originally enacted

The Regulatory Reform (Execution of Deeds and Documents) Order 2005 (SI 2005/1906) is a statutory instrument applicable in England and Wales which was issued by the Lord Chancellor and signed by Baroness Catherine Ashton, then a minister in the Department of Constitutional Affairs. It reformed the legislation governing the execution of deeds and documents in order to standardise the formal requirements for companies, corporations and individuals.

It made amendments to the Law of Property Act 1925, the Companies Act 1985 and the Law of Property (Miscellaneous Provisions) Act 1989.

Like other England and Wales Regulatory Reform Orders, it was made through the exercise of powers available under the Regulatory Reform Act 2001.
