= Saltwells Local Nature Reserve =

Nature reserve in the West Midlands, England

Coordinates: 52.483°N 2.098°W

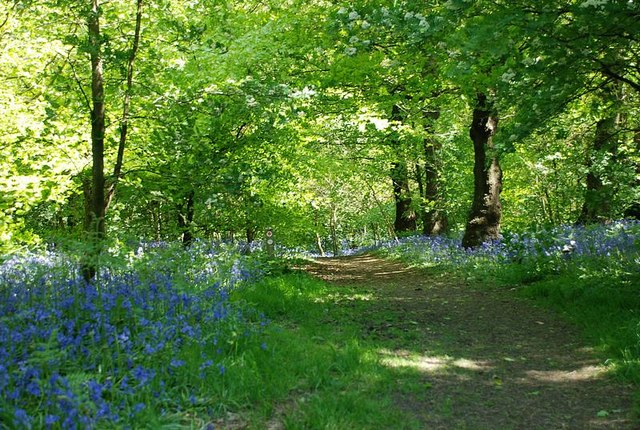
- Path in Saltwells Wood
- Interactive map of Saltwells Local Nature Reserve
- Type: Local Nature Reserve
- Location: Netherton, Dudley, West Midlands
- OS grid: SO 935869
- Area: 247 acres (100 ha)
- Created: 1981
- Manager: Dudley Metropolitan Borough Council

Saltwells Local Nature Reserve is situated in the Netherton area of Dudley Metropolitan Borough in West Midlands, England. The reserve, created in 1981, covers 247 acres and includes Saltwells Wood and part of Netherton Hill within its boundaries. The reserve encloses two Sites of Special Scientific Interest and one scheduled ancient monument.

== History ==
Saltwells Local Nature Reserve was created in 1981 and was the first such reserve created in the county of West Midlands.

Although now mainly woodland and grass-covered areas, the reserve was once the scene of extensive industrial activity, particularly the extraction of coal, which took place from medieval times until the second half of the 20th century. For example, Saltwells Wood, in the centre of the reserve, contains the remains of medieval coal-mining activity, and part of it was designated as a scheduled ancient monument in 2002. Much more recently, the side of Netherton Hill in the reserve, now covered in gorse and grassland, was the site of opencast coal mining in the 1960s. Saltwells Wood contains other traces of industrial activity, the most notable probably being Doulton's Claypit, a site where clay was extracted for many years. The claypit has been designated a Site of Special Scientific Interest (SSSI). Another SSSI within the reserve is Brewin's Canal Section. This site was designated because the canal cutting, dating from the 1858 canal improvements, displays geological strata from the base of the coal measures.

Just off the Cinderbank road, inside the reserve, lies the site of Netherton Hall, once owned by the family of the Lords of Dudley with records going back to the 16th century. The hall fell down in 1860 century as a result of mining subsidence.

== Location and extent ==
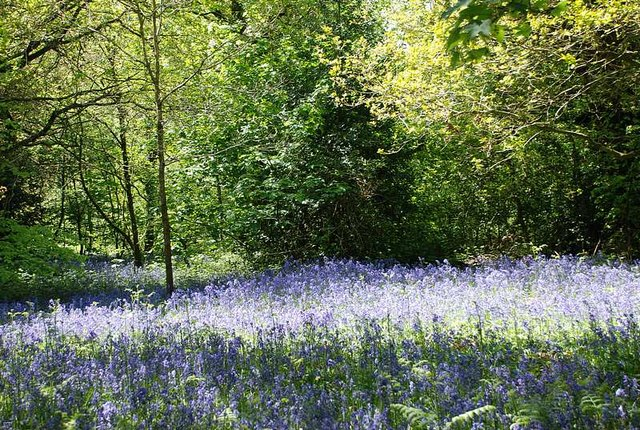
Bluebells in Saltwells Wood

Saltwells Local Nature Reserve is situated in the Netherton area, about 2 miles south of Dudley. The main part of the reserve is formed by Saltwells Wood and the west side of Netherton Hill. The reserve also follows the Tipsyford Brook and Mousesweet Brook as far as the boundary of Quarry Bank and Cradley Heath to the south, whilst to the north-east the reserve stretches to the A459 (Cinderbank Road).

== Landscape ==
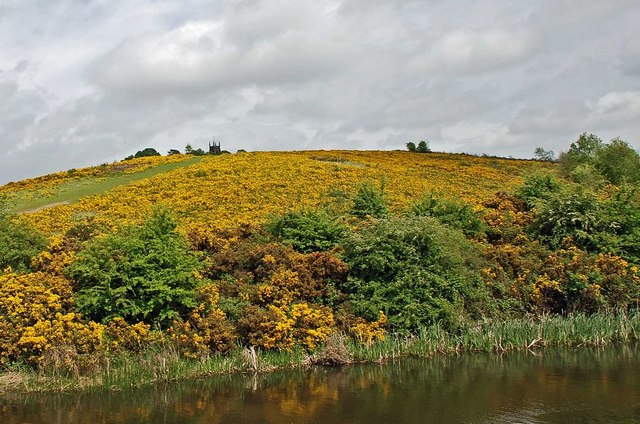
Netherton Hill as viewed from the Dudley No.2 canal

The reserve can be divided into two main parts. To the north of the Lodge Farm Estate, lies the gorse-covered side of Netherton Hill and grassy fields. A path leads from the fields to Cinderbank Road. This path, known as Hall Lane, once led to the now-demolished Netherton Hall. There is a small pond in this area called the Daphne Pool. South of the Lodge Farm Estate lies Saltwells Wood, which is a plantation dating from the 18th century. Parts of the wood were once known as Lady Dudley's Plantation or Lady Wood. In late spring, the woods are carpeted with bluebells. To the south of the woods a path follows the course of the Black Brook and Mousesweet Brook until it exits the reserve on the A4100 road between Quarry Bank and Cradley Heath.

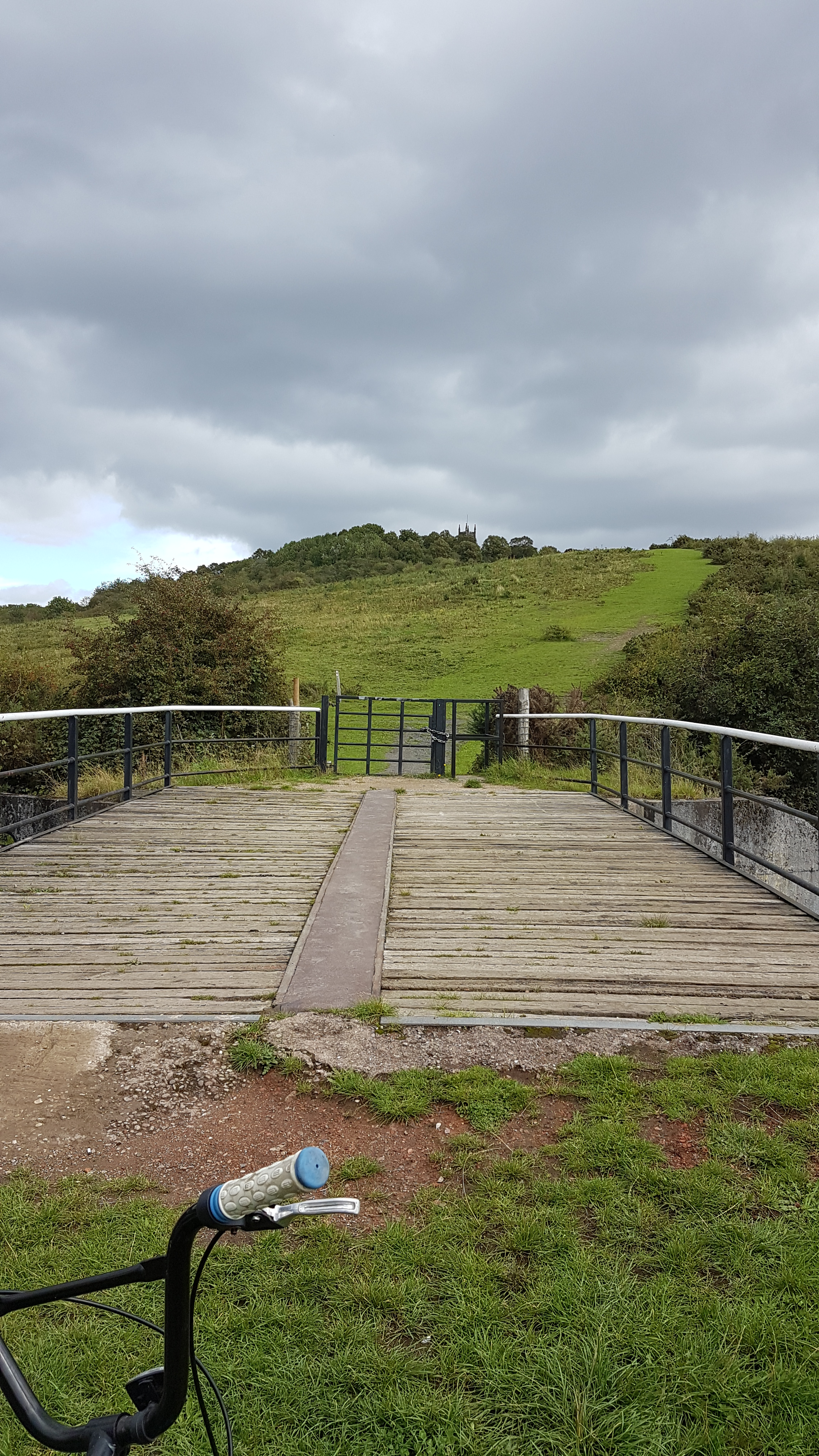
View Of Netherton hill Netherton Church from the canal

== Salt-water springs ==
The reserve gets its name from the saline water that welled up in the mine workings. In his Natural History of Staffordshire, published in 1686, the naturalist Dr Robert Plot wrote: "in Pensnett Chase South from Dudley about a mile and a half there is another weak brine belonging to the right Honorable Edward Lord Ward, of which his Lordship once attempted to make salt; but the brine proving too weak, he thought fit to desist". In the 19th and early 20th centuries, people came to bathe in the water, which was claimed to have healing properties. The baths were near the present-day Saltwells Inn. An 1833 publication noted: "in Lady-wood is a valuable spring, called the Spa Well, in high estimation for its efficacy in cutaneous disorders and complaints arising from indigestion".

== Sculptures ==
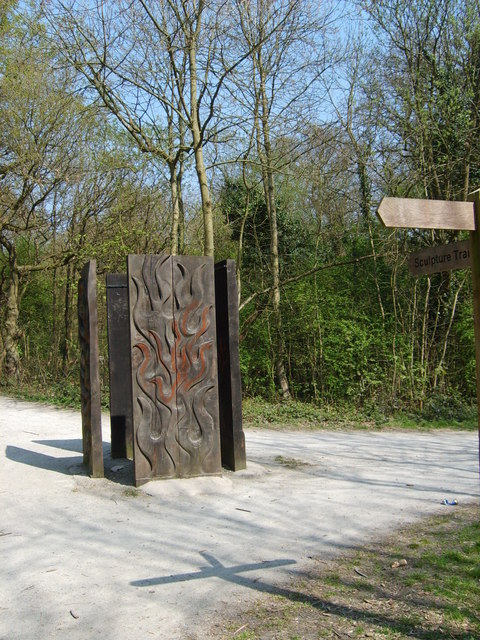
Sculpture in Saltwells Wood

Saltwells Wood contains a number of sculptures in both wood and metal. The designs for the wooden sculptures, which include a "wildlife totempole" included input from nearby primary schools and local artists. The metal sculptures, constructed from re-used industrial parts, represent various animals.

== The Saltwells Inn ==
Located within the boundaries of Saltwells Local Nature Reserve, Saltwells Inn is a historic public house dating back to the 18th century. Originally serving as a resting place for those visiting the area's natural saline springs, the Inn has since become a popular spot for visitors exploring the nature reserve. Today, it offers traditional British pub fare, local ales, and serves as a hub for community events. The Inn’s proximity to the Saltwells Nature Reserve makes it an ideal stop for nature enthusiasts and walkers.
