= Daw End Railway Cutting =

Coordinates: 52.59958°N 1.94976°W

- Site of Special Scientific Interest
- Location of Daw End Railway Cutting.
- Area of search: West Midlands
- Grid reference: SK035002
- Interest: Geological
- Area: 8.1 ha (20 acres)
- Notification date: 1986
- Location map: English Nature

Daw End Railway Cutting (grid reference SK035002) is an 8.1 hectares (20 acres) geological site of Special Scientific Interest in the West Midlands. The site was notified in 1986 under the Wildlife and Countryside Act 1981 and is currently managed by the Country Trust.

== See also ==
- List of Sites of Special Scientific Interest in the West Midlands
