= Fens Pools =

Coordinates: 52.49525°N 2.11926°W

- Site of Special Scientific Interest
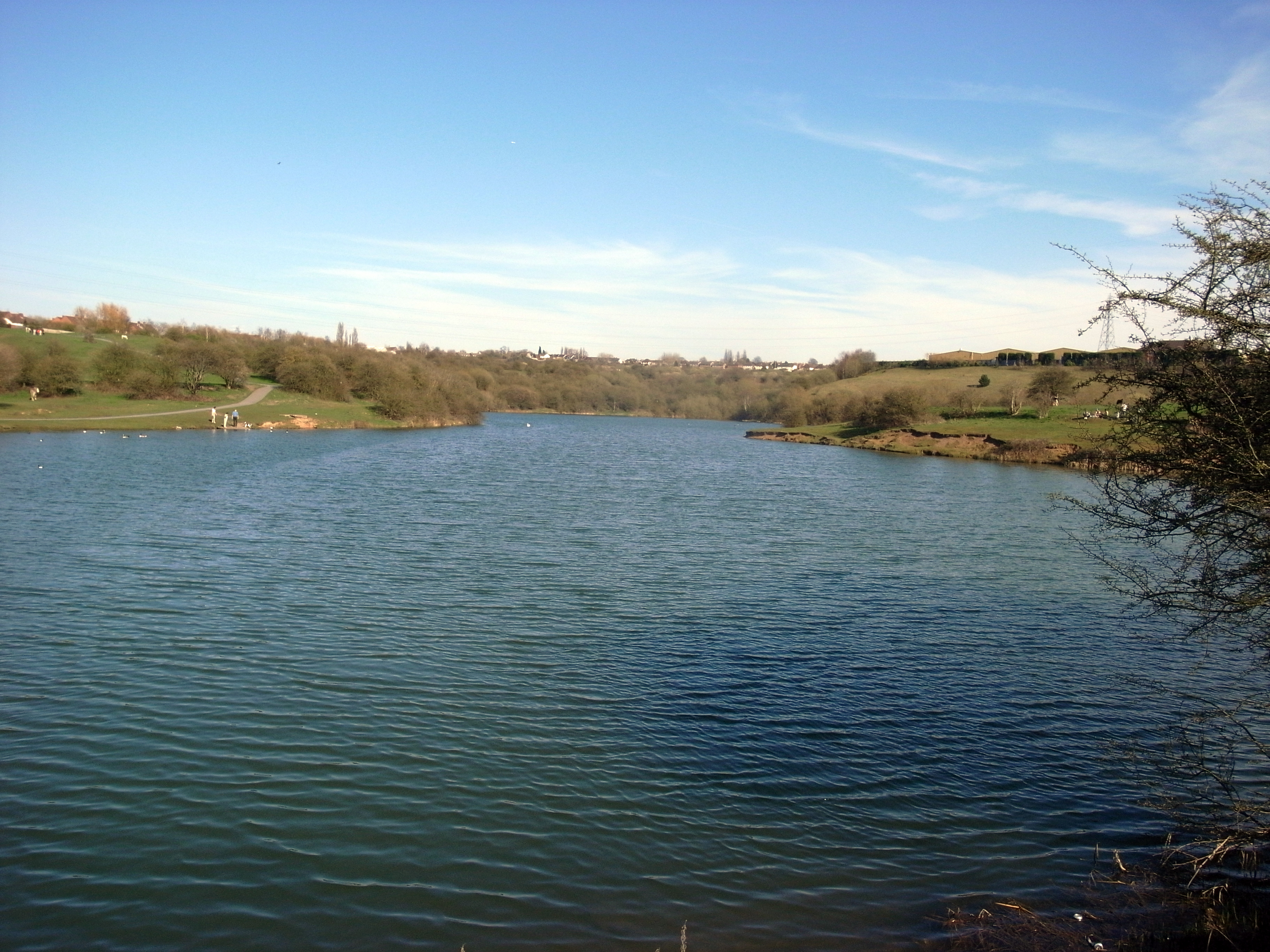
- Middle Pool
- Location of Fens Pools.
- Area of search: West Midlands
- Grid reference: SO920886
- Interest: Biological
- Area: 37.6 ha (93 acres)
- Notification date: 1989
- Location map: English Nature

Fens Pools (grid reference SO920886) is a 37.6 hectares (93 acres) biological site of Special Scientific Interest in the West Midlands. The site was notified in 1989. under the Wildlife and Countryside Act 1981 and is currently managed by the Country Trust.

== History ==
The pools, which consist of Grove Pool, Middle Pool and Fens Pool, were originally constructed by the Stourbridge Canal Company. The canal was opened in 1779, and the lake reservoirs fed into a navigable branch which joined the canal's main line at Leys Junction, close to the top of the Stourbridge Flight of 16 locks, through which the level of the canal falls by 145 feet (44 m). The reservoirs formed the main source of water supply for these locks, until it was supplemented by water leaving the Dudley Canal, with which the Stourbridge Canal made an end-on junction in 1792.

== Location ==
The area is situated between Pensnett and Brierley Hill in the Metropolitan Borough of Dudley. It forms part of the larger Buckpool and Fens Pool Local Nature Reserve.

== Wildlife ==
The site includes open water, swamps, fens and flood vegetation, unimproved grassland and scrub. It is the best place in the West Midlands for amphibians, with the common frog, common toad, smooth newt and great crested newt breeding here, this site having the largest population of great crested newts in the West Midlands. As well as a variety of grasses and sedges, there are mare's-tail, common club-rush, orange foxtail and lesser water-parsnip. Some unimproved natural grassland shows signs of ancient ridge and furrow cultivation and supports the rare adder's-tongue fern. At least ten species of dragonfly have been observed here, and over twenty species of butterfly.

Birds that breed here include the reed warbler, the sedge warbler, the lesser whitethroat and the great crested grebe, and sometimes the little ringed plover. The pools provide a large expanse of open water, and form an important habitat for overwintering and migrating birds. Shovelers and gadwalls can regularly be seen, while bitterns have also been observed.

== See also ==
- List of Sites of Special Scientific Interest in the West Midlands
