= Jockey Fields =

Protected area in the West Midlands, England

Coordinates: 52.62475°N 1.94087°W

Jockey fields
- Site of Special Scientific Interest
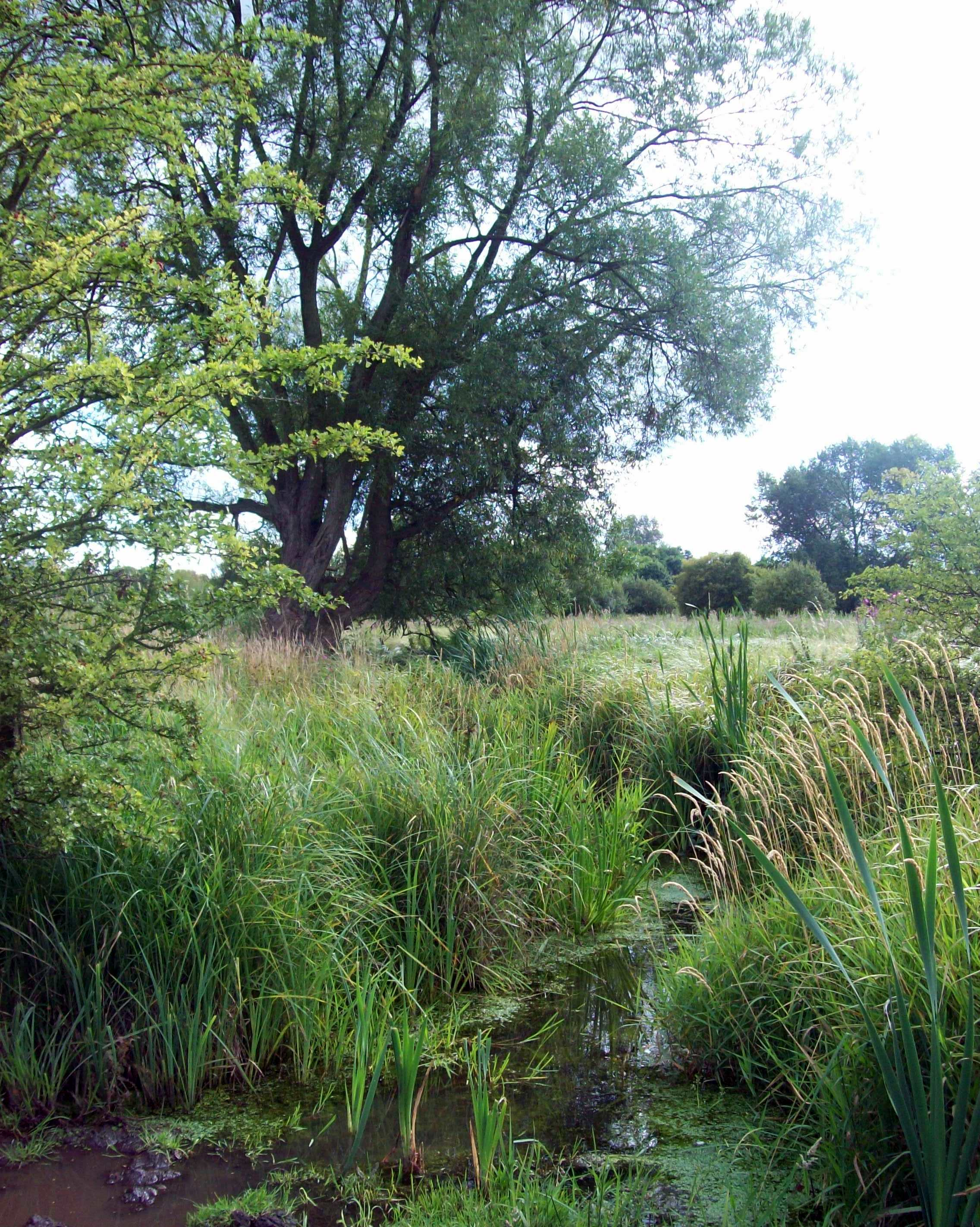
- Location of Jockey fields.
- Area of search: West Midlands
- Grid reference: SK041030
- Interest: Biological
- Area: 18.05 ha (44.6 acres)
- Notification date: 1994
- Location map: English Nature

Jockey fields (grid reference SK041030) is an 18.05 hectares (44.6 acres) biological site of Special Scientific Interest at Walsall Wood, in the West Midlands. The site was notified in 1994 under the Wildlife and Countryside Act 1981 and is currently managed by the Country Trust.

The site notification details 38 plant species recorded at this SSI:

Plant species recorded at Jockey Fields SSI
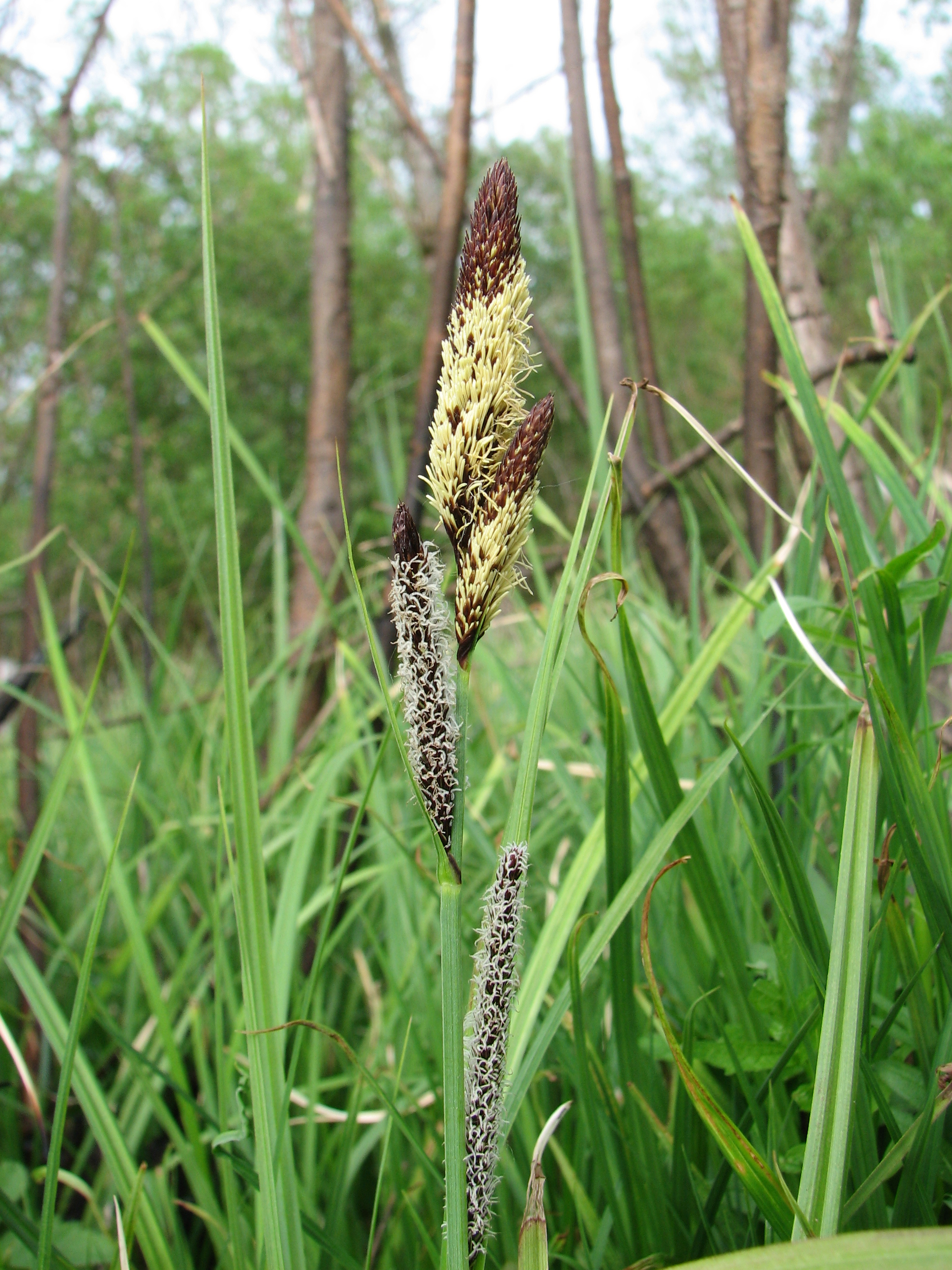
Carex acutiformis, lesser pond sedge.

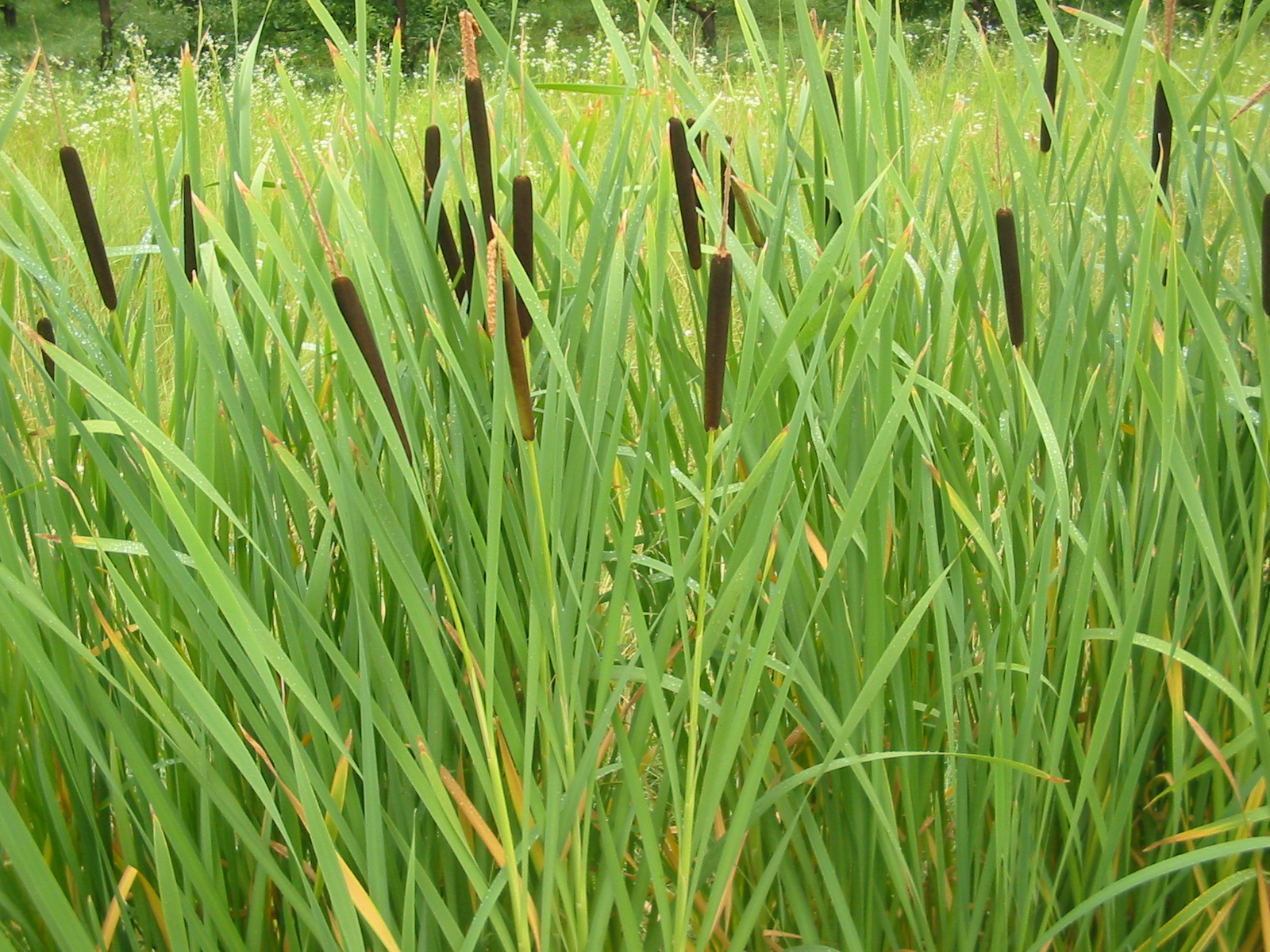
Typha latifolia, common bullrush.

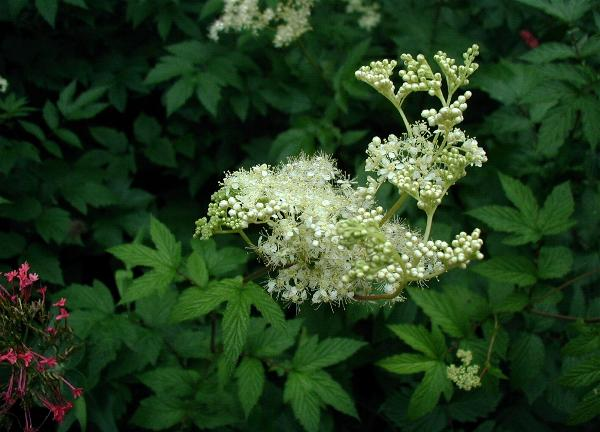
Filipendula ulmaria, meadowsweet.

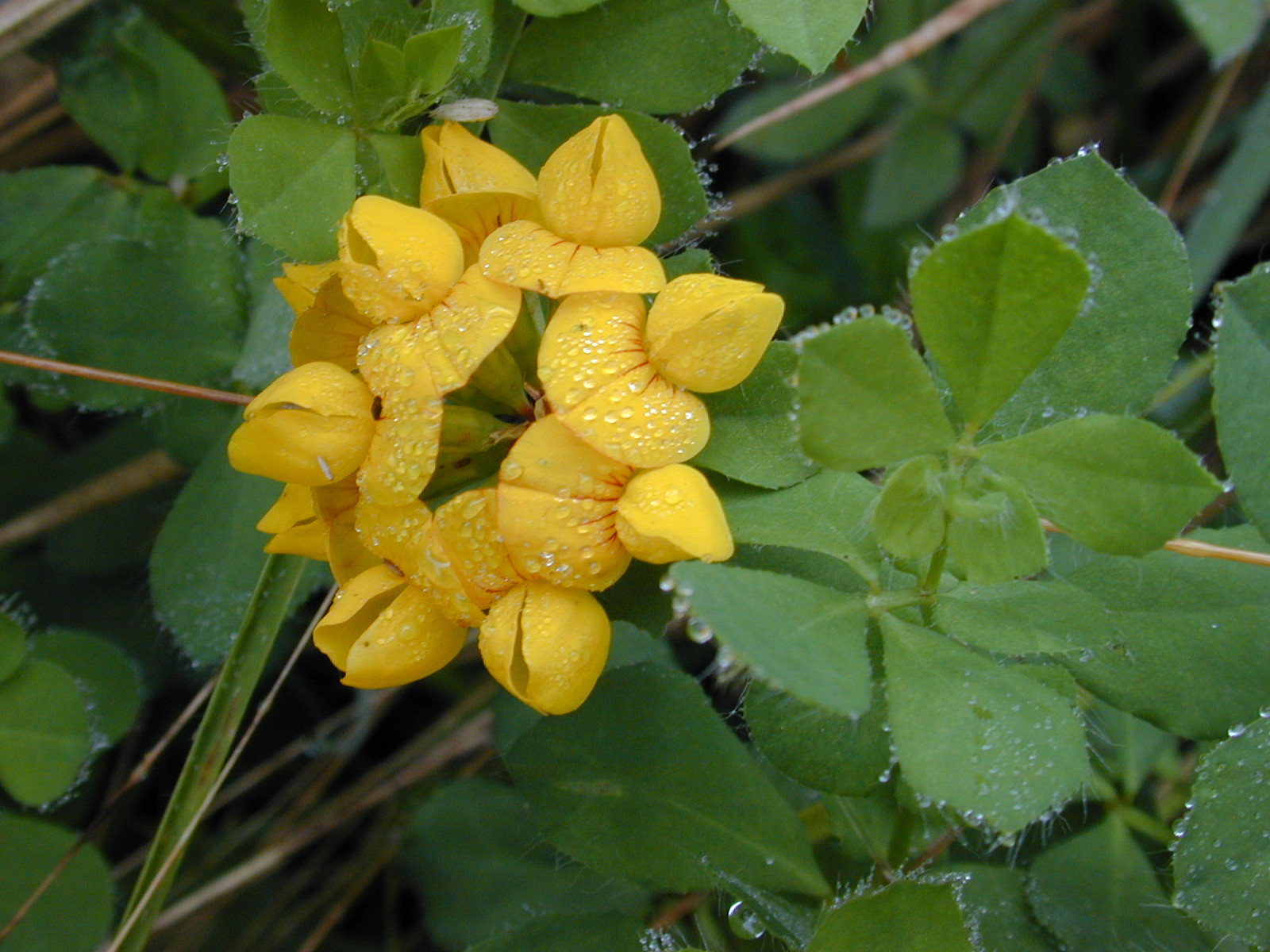
Lotus pedunculatus, greater bird's foot trefoil.

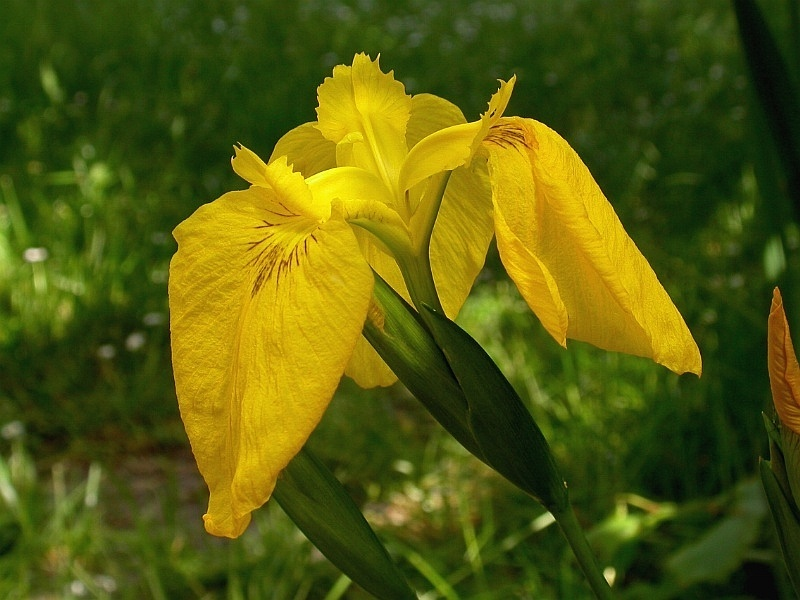
Iris pseudacorus, yellow iris.

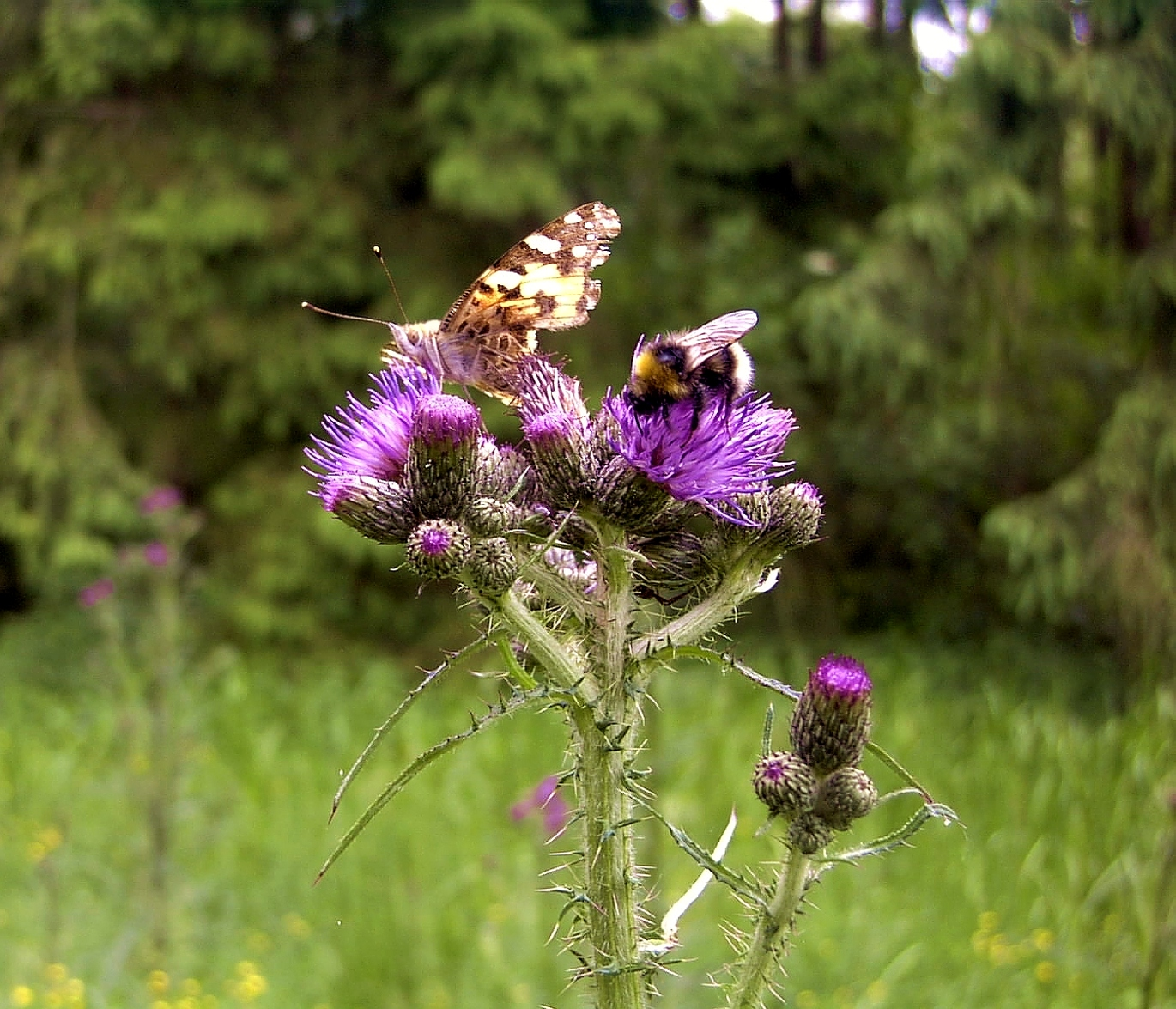
Cirsium palustre, marsh thistle

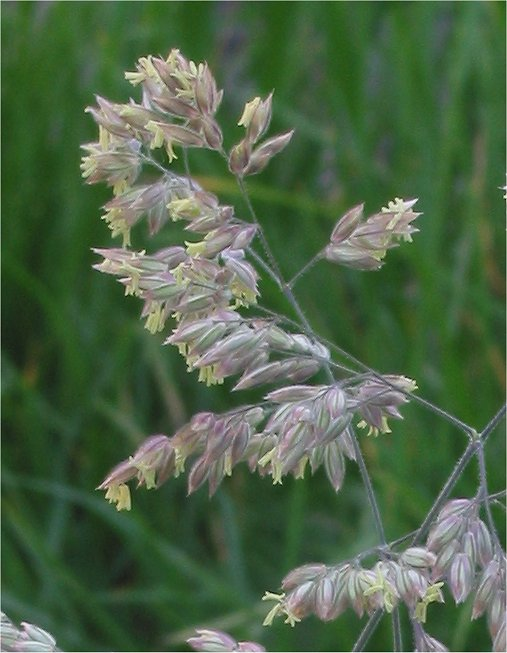
Holcus lanatus, Yorkshire fog.

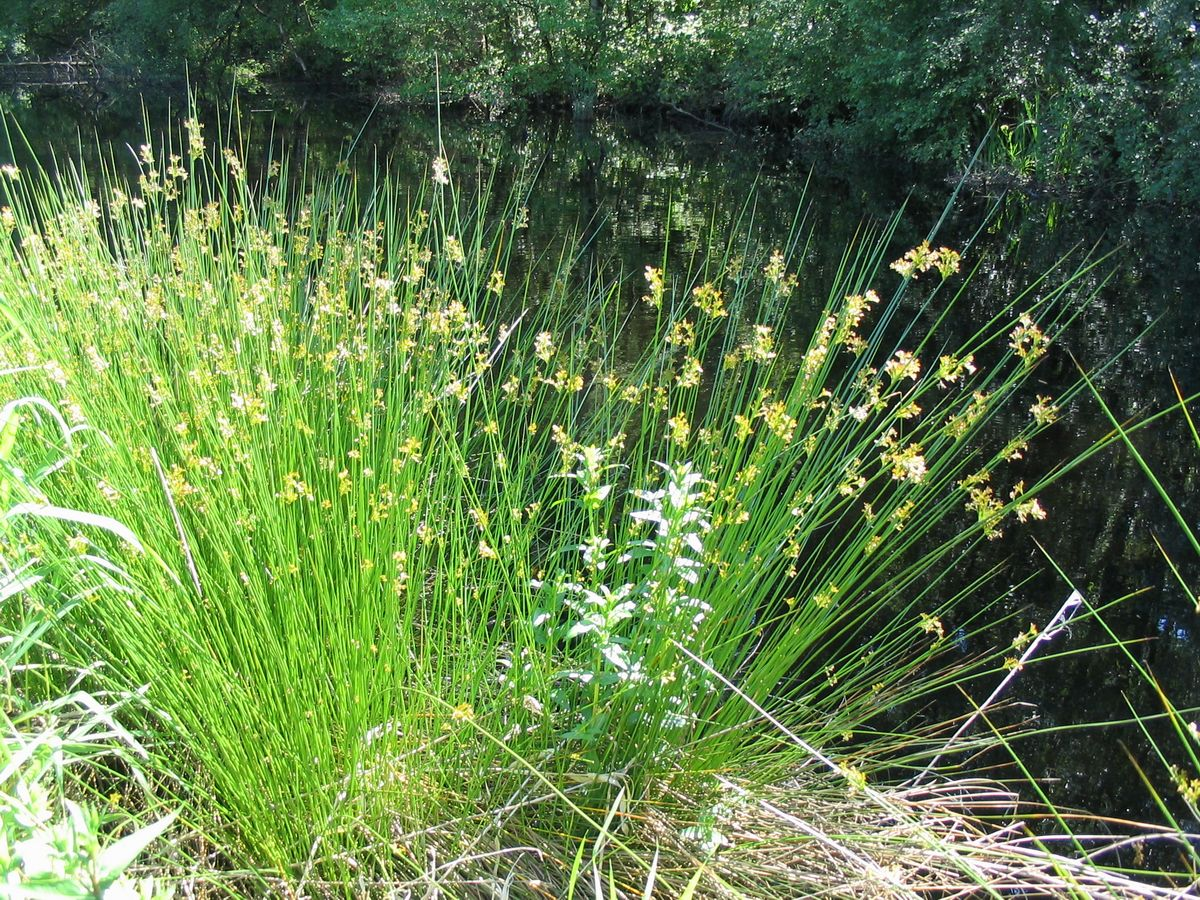
Juncus effusus, soft rush.

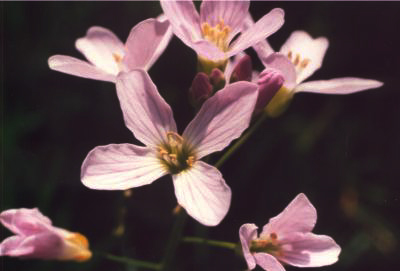
Cardamine pratensis, cuckooflower.

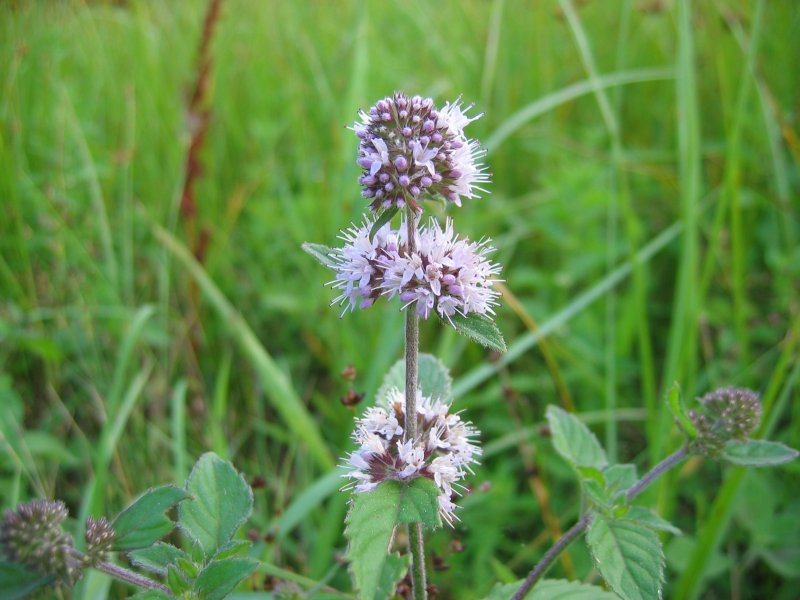
Mentha aquatica, water mint.

Stellaria alsine, bog stitchwort

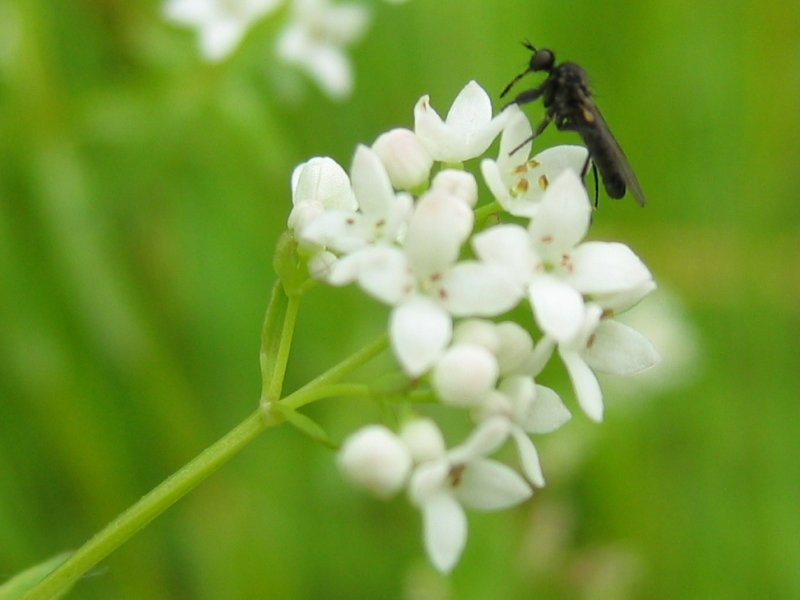
Galium palustre, common marsh-bedstraw.

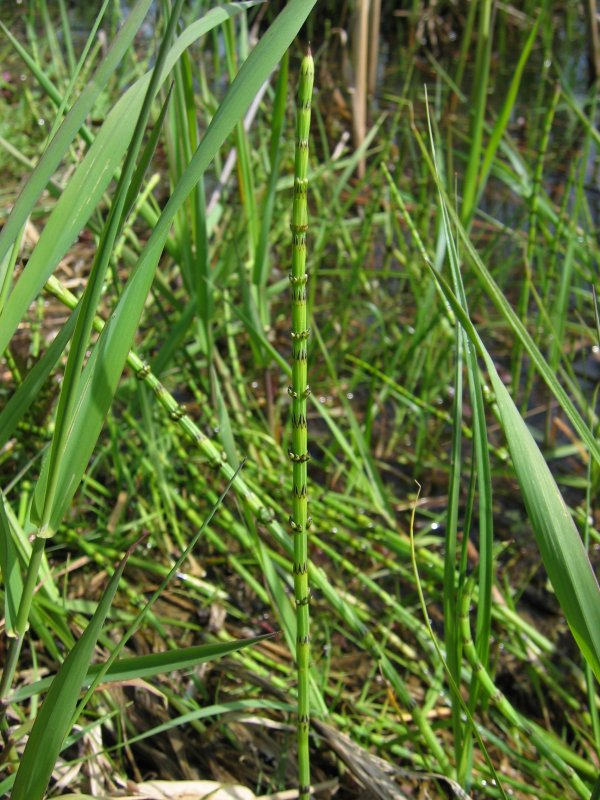
Equisetum palustre, marsh horsetail.

== See also ==
- List of Sites of Special Scientific Interest in the West Midlands
