= Webster's Claypit =

Coordinates: 52.42144°N 1.50147°W

- Site of Special Scientific Interest
- Location of Webster's Claypit.
- Area of search: West Midlands
- Grid reference: SP340805
- Interest: Geological
- Area: 0.3 ha (0.74 acres)
- Notification date: 1986
- Location map: English Nature

Webster's Claypit (grid reference SP340805) is a 0.3 hectares (0.74 acres) geological site of Special Scientific Interest in the West Midlands. The site was notified in 1986 under the Wildlife and Countryside Act 1981 and is currently managed by the Country Trust.

== See also ==
- List of Sites of Special Scientific Interest in the West Midlands
