= Bromsgrove Road Cutting =

Coordinates: 52.44945°N 2.04410°W

- Site of Special Scientific Interest
- Location of Bromsgrove Road Cutting.
- Area of search: West Midlands
- Grid reference: SO971835
- Interest: Geological
- Area: 0.2 ha (0.49 acres)
- Notification date: 1990
- Location map: English Nature

Bromsgrove Road Cutting is a 0.2 hectares (0.49 acres) geological site of Special Scientific Interest in the West Midlands. The site was notified in 1990 under the Wildlife and Countryside Act 1981. It is located on the eastern edge of Halesowen.

== See also ==
- List of Sites of Special Scientific Interest in the West Midlands
