= Prayer motion =

Parliamentary procedure

A prayer motion is a method by which a member of the UK House of Lords or the House of Commons can object to or comment on secondary legislation. Prayer Motions in the House of Commons typically take the form of an Early Day Motion. A fatal prayer must be tabled within 40 days from the introduction of the Statutory Instrument to annul the Instrument. A "fatal motion" can end the parliamentary legislation process, forcing the government to start again if they wish to re-introduce the legislation. A "motion to regret" allows members of the Lords to express their opposition to legislation without stopping it. A "motion to take note" allows the expression of opinion without implying disapproval.
