= Monkspath Meadow =

Protected area in the West Midlands, England

Coordinates: 52.38454°N 1.78839°W

- Site of Special Scientific Interest
- Location of Monkspath Meadow.
- Area of search: West Midlands
- Grid reference: SP145763
- Interest: Biological
- Area: 1.2 ha (3.0 acres)
- Notification date: 1986
- Location map: English Nature

Monkspath Meadow is a 1.2 ha (3.0 acres) ancient hay-meadow and a biological site of Special Scientific Interest in the West Midlands. The site was notified in 1986 under the Wildlife and Countryside Act 1981. It is on the south-eastern edge of Monkspath. The site has recently been targeted for development for houses but these plans have been met with uproar from locals in Monkspath and nearby villages, such as Cheswick Green and Hockley Heath, as it would destroy such a special natural site.

The site has probably been used as a hay meadow for over 800 years, and has not been ploughed for at least 200 years. It was originally at risk of development from the construction of a new local supermarket and garden centre in 1986. A little over half of the site was saved from development by a campaign led by Members of Warwickshire Nature Conservation Trust when proposals for the new supermarket were outlined. The remaining 1 ha (2.5 acres) of meadow was dug up by the Warwickshire Wildlife Trust when the supermarket was built and relocated in 9 in (23 cm) deep turves to a new site at Temple Balsall. this involved destroying the existing orchid filled wildflower meadow at Temple Balsall and replacing it with the turves from Monkapath Meadow which were also destroyed in the process resulting in a field of poor quality rush and creeping thistle instead of an important wildflower meadow.

Neither site is now accessible to the general public and The Warwickshire Wildlife Trust take no interest in either site having now removed it from their nature conservation handbook as one of their nature reserves.

Today Notcutts Garden Centre manages the site under the direction of English Nature. The meadow supports a diverse level of flora with over 150 recorded species, including various grass species such as common bent (Agrostis capillaris), red fescue (Festuca rubra), Yorkshire fog (Holcus lanatus) and tufted hair-grass (Deschampsia cespitosa). Herbs include cowslip (Primula veris), betony (Stachys officinalis), great burnet (Sanguisorba officinalis), dyer's greenweed (Genista tinctoria), meadow thistle (Cirsium dissectum), saw-wort (Serratula tinctoria), heath grass (Danthonia decumbens), heath spotted orchid (Dactylorhiza maculata), and common spotted orchid (Dactylorhiza maculata). Fauna includes for small heath (Coenonympha pamphilus), meadow brown (Maniola jurtina) and common blue (Polyommatus icarus) butterflies.

.

== See also ==
- List of Sites of Special Scientific Interest in the West Midlands
- Ragged Robins Nature Notes: webpage for Monkspath meadow
