= Illey Pastures =

- Site of Special Scientific Interest
- Location within West Midlands county
- Location of Illey Pastures.
- Area of search: West Midlands
- Grid reference: SO977812
- Coordinates: 52.428852°N 2.033095°W
- Interest: Biological
- Area: 3.5 ha (8.6 acres)
- Notification date: 1989
- Location map: English Nature

Illey Pastures is a 3.5-hectare (8.6-acre) biological site of Special Scientific Interest in the West Midlands. The site was notified in 1989 under the Wildlife and Countryside Act 1981. It is close to the village of Illey.

== See also ==
- List of Sites of Special Scientific Interest in the West Midlands
