= Bickenhill Meadows =

Coordinates: 52.4365°N 1.7336°W

- Site of Special Scientific Interest
- Location of Bickenhill Meadows.
- Area of search: West Midlands
- Grid reference: SP182822 & SP188816
- Interest: Biological
- Area: 7.2 ha (18 acres)
- Notification date: 1991
- Location map: English Nature

Bickenhill Meadows is a 7.2 hectares (18 acres) biological site of Special Scientific Interest in the West Midlands. The site was notified in 1991 under the Wildlife and Countryside Act 1981.

== See also ==
- List of Sites of Special Scientific Interest in the West Midlands
