= Doulton's Claypit =

Coordinates: 52.48089°N 2.09566°W

- Site of Special Scientific Interest
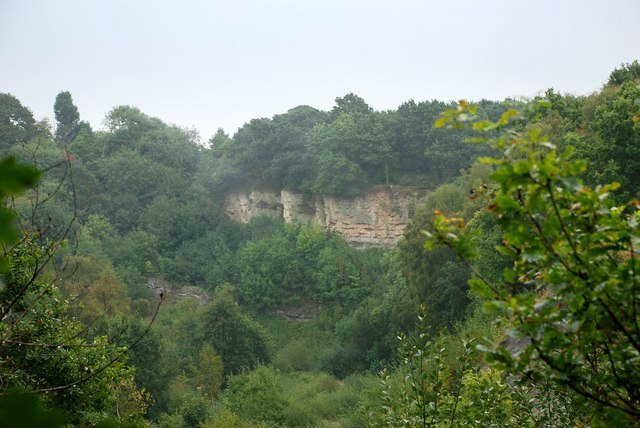
- Location of Doulton's Claypit.
- Area of search: West Midlands
- Grid reference: SO936870
- Interest: Geological
- Area: 3.3 ha (8.2 acres)
- Notification date: 1986
- Location map: Nature

Doulton's Claypit (grid reference SO936870) is a 3.3 hectares (8.2 acres) geological site of Special Scientific Interest in the West Midlands. The site was notified in 1986 under the Wildlife and Countryside Act 1981 and is currently managed by the Country Trust.

The site is noteworthy for its exposure of strata of the Middle Coal Measures, laid down during the Westphalian stage of the Carboniferous period.

== See also ==
- List of Sites of Special Scientific Interest in the West Midlands
