= Ketley Claypit =

Coordinates: 52.49701°N 2.15167°W

- Site of Special Scientific Interest
- Location of Ketley Claypit.
- Area of search: West Midlands
- Grid reference: SO898888
- Interest: Geological
- Area: 13.7 ha (34 acres)
- Notification date: 1990
- Location map: English Nature

Ketley Claypit is a 13.7 hectares (34 acres) geological site of Special Scientific Interest in the West Midlands. The site was notified in 1990 under the Wildlife and Countryside Act 1981. It is located in Kingswinford.

== See also ==
- List of Sites of Special Scientific Interest in the West Midlands
