= Delegated Powers and Regulatory Reform Select Committee =

The Delegated Powers and Regulatory Reform Committee is a committee of UK parliamentarians. Members are drawn from the House of Lords. The committee has several primary functions.

== Orders ==
The Delegated Powers and Regulatory Reform Committee is appointed by the House of Lords in each session with orders of reference "to report whether the provisions of any bill inappropriately delegate legislative power," or whether they subject the exercise of legislative power to an inappropriate level of parliamentary scrutiny; to report on documents and draft orders laid before Parliament under the Legislative and Regulatory Reform Act 2006; and to perform, in respect of such documents and orders and subordinate provisions orders laid under that Act, the functions performed in respect of other instruments by the Joint Committee on Statutory Instruments.

== Rationale ==
Parliament often and increasingly confers powers on the executive to make delegated (or secondary) legislation. The purpose of such legislation is often practical − to enable ministers to make provision at a level of detail inappropriate for inclusion in the Act, or designed to meet changing circumstances. But the powers delegated can also be more substantial − enabling ministers to fill in large gaps left by so-called 'skeleton bills', or to amend and even repeal primary legislation ('Henry VIII powers'). Such enabling clauses in bills remove legislation from detailed parliamentary scrutiny.

As a result, this Select Committee was set up.

== Working practices ==
The committee receives all bills introduced in either House when they reach the Lords. There is no equivalent committee in the House of Commons. Bills are accompanied by a special memorandum explaining each of the proposed delegations. The memorandum, published with the committee's report, identifies each of the delegations; describes their purpose; explains why the matter has been left to delegated legislation; and explains the degree of parliamentary control provided for each, and why it is thought appropriate. The committee also has the benefit of an opinion of its legal adviser. The committee then examines whether the bill or its parts are appropriate in terms of delegations. In some cases, parts of bills are declared inappropriate. More frequently, recommendations are made to increase the level of parliamentary scrutiny over a particular delegation.

Since the passage of the Regulatory Reform Act 2001, the remit of the committee, and its name, have been extended. It is now the select committee on delegated powers and regulatory reform. In the case of Regulatory Reform Orders they do not examine the policy proposed, but whether the statutory tests of the 2001 Act have been met, particularly whether the orders actually reduce regulatory burdens. They also consider whether the proposal is appropriate to be delivered by secondary legislation and at times conclude that this is not the case. Parliament's work in this area is set to expand greatly, with the passage of the Regulatory Reform Act 2006.

== Chairs ==
Committee chairs include those listed below.

Name	Start	End	Party
The Baroness Thomas of Winchester	9 June 2010	30 March 2015	Liberal Democrats
The Baroness Fookes	8 June 2015	7 September 2017	Conservative
The Lord Blencathra	7 September 2017	19 January 2022	Conservative
The Lord McLoughlin	19 January 2022	30 January 2025	Conservative
The Baroness Ramsey of Wall Heath	30 January 2025	12 June 2026	Labour
The Lord Pitkeathley of Camden Town	22 June 2026	present	Labour

== Membership ==
As of October 2026, the membership of the committee is as follows:

Member	Party
Lord Pitkeathley of Camden Town (Chair)	Labour
Lord Bates	Conservative
Baroness Chakrabarti	Labour
Baroness Finlay of Llandaff	Crossbench
Lord Goodman of Wycombe	Conservative
Viscount Goschen	Conservative
Lord Hall of Birkenhead	Crossbench
Baroness Harris of Richmond	Liberal Democrat
Lord Rowlands	Labour
Baroness Scott of Needham Market	Liberal Democrat

== See also ==
- Parliamentary committees of the United Kingdom
