= Brewin's Canal Section =

Coordinates: 52.48628°N 2.09568°W

- Site of Special Scientific Interest
- Location of Brewin's Canal Section.
- Area of search: West Midlands
- Grid reference: SO936876
- Interest: Geological
- Area: 1.34 ha (3.3 acres)
- Notification date: 1990
- Location map: English Nature

Brewin's Canal Section (grid reference SO936876) is a 1.34-hectare (3.3-acre) geological site of Special Scientific Interest in the West Midlands. The site was notified in 1990 under the Wildlife and Countryside Act 1981 and is currently managed by the Country Trust. The site was deemed invaluable for understanding the development of coal deposits in the Midlands.

== See also ==
- List of Sites of Special Scientific Interest in the West Midlands
