= Larsen trap =

Bird trapping device

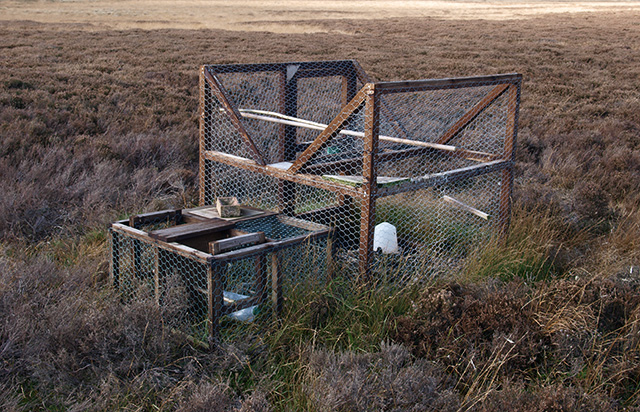
A Larsen trap on the North York Moors in England

A Larsen trap is a device used to live trap wildbirds. It is used in avian predator control programs, and in scientific research.

It is essentially a cage with two (or more) compartments. A previously caught magpie or crow is kept in the decoy compartment, and this attracts territory holders who see the decoy as an intruder.

== Use in the United Kingdom ==
Carrion crow in a trap in Scotland. The cage includes a tub of water and a pheasant carcass, for the benefit of trapped birds.

The Larsen trap is legal to use in the United Kingdom under general licence. It is the most widely used magpie population control method amongst gamekeepers, magpies are also controlled by conservationists. It is also used to trap magpies by those concerned for the well-being of nesting song-birds.

The decoy bird must be properly cared for according to local regulations. In 2003 the RSPCA successfully appealed an acquittal of a case in which a single decoy magpie was used throughout the summer in a cage which was too small for the bird to stretch its wings, contrary to the Wildlife and Countryside Act.

The law in Scotland permits their use without any training in how to handle and kill birds humanely. Legally set traps are often vandalised.
