= Berkswell Marsh =

Protected area in the West Midlands, England

Coordinates: 52.41573°N 1.66620°W

- Site of Special Scientific Interest
- Location of Berkswell Marsh.
- Area of search: West Midlands
- Grid reference: SP228798
- Interest: Biological
- Area: 7.5 ha (19 acres)
- Notification date: 1991
- Location map: English Nature

Berkswell Marsh is a 7.5 hectares (19 acres) biological site of Special Scientific Interest in the West Midlands, en. The site was notified in 1991 under the Wildlife and Countryside Act 1981. It is located in the Meriden Gap which is between Birmingham and Coventry.

== See also ==
- List of Sites of Special Scientific Interest in the West Midlands
