= AOSP =

AOSP or AoSP may refer to:

- Android Open Source Project, part of the Android operating system ecosystem
- Area of Special Protection, under the UK Wildlife and Countryside Act 1981
- Athabasca Oil Sands Project, heavy oil development in northern Alberta, Canada
