= Clayhanger Marsh =

Protected area in the West Midlands, England

- Site of Special Scientific Interest
- Location within West Midlands county
- Location of Clayhanger Marsh.
- Area of search: West Midlands
- Grid reference: SK034045
- Coordinates: 52.63824°N 1.95119°W
- Interest: Biological
- Area: 23.8 ha (59 acres)
- Notification date: 1986
- Location map: English Nature

Clayhanger Marsh is a 23.8 hectares (59 acres) biological site of Special Scientific Interest in the West Midlands, England. The site was notified in 1986 under the Wildlife and Countryside Act 1981. It is located to the north of Walsall.

The first vagrant bufflehead recorded in the West Midlands county was found here in June 2004.

== See also ==
- List of Sites of Special Scientific Interest in the West Midlands
