= List of Sites of Special Scientific Interest in the West Midlands =

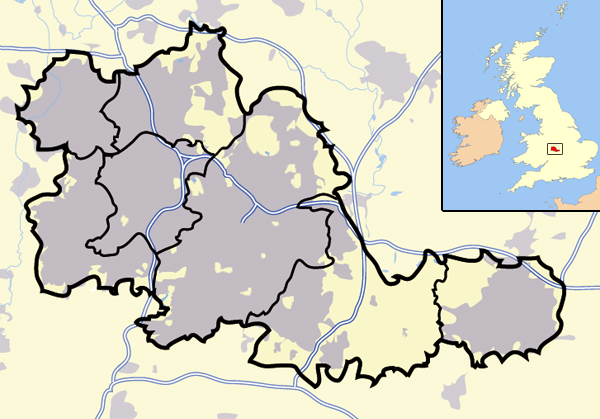
A map of West Midlands, and its location within the United Kingdom also shown

There are twenty-three Sites of Special Scientific Interest (SSSIs) in the county of the West Midlands, England. As of 2008, of the twenty-three designated sites, eleven have been designated due to their biological interest, nine due to their geological interest and three for both. In England, the body responsible for designating SSSIs is Natural England, which chooses sites because of their flora, fauna, geological or physiographical features. Natural England took over the role of designating and managing SSSIs from English Nature in October 2006 when it was formed from the amalgamation of English Nature, parts of the Countryside Agency and the Rural Development Service. Natural England, like its predecessor, uses the 1974-1996 county system with each area being called an Area of Search. In the West Midlands case, the Area of Search matches the county boundary.

The West Midlands is the second largest conurbation, after Greater London, with a population of over 2.6 million inhabitants. Consisting of three large cities, Wolverhampton, Birmingham and Coventry, the county of the West Midlands is also one of the most densely populated areas in the United Kingdom. The result of this large human population is that every part of the area has been influenced by humans—often negatively—for example, the clearance of woodland to make room for agriculture. The West Midlands is an area of relatively high ground, ranging from around 500 to 1,000 feet (152–305 m) above sea level, forming the Birmingham Plateau. It is crossed by Britain's main north–south watershed between the basins of the Rivers Severn and Trent. The main habitat types in the area are heathland, woodland and grassland, all of which are found in both urban and rural contexts.

Between the West Midlands conurbation and Coventry is a stretch of green belt land roughly 15 miles (24 km) across known as the "Meriden Gap", which retains a strongly rural character, and is the site of a number of SSSIs including Berkswell Marsh. A smaller green belt is located between Birmingham, Walsall and West Bromwich which includes Sutton Park in Sutton Coldfield. Sutton Park, an SSSI and national nature reserve, has an area of 9.001 square kilometres (3.475 sq mi) making it one of the largest urban parks in Europe and the largest European park outside a capital city.

== Sites ==
Site name	Reason for designation		Area^{[A]}		Grid reference^{[B]}^{[C]}	Year in which notified^{[D]}	Map^{[E]}
Site name	Biological interest	Geological interest	Hectares	Acres	Grid reference^{[B]}^{[C]}	Year in which notified^{[D]}	Map^{[E]}
Berkswell Marsh	✓		7.5	18.5	SP228798	1991	Map
Bickenhill Meadows	✓		7.2	17.8	SP182822 & SP188816	1991	Map
Brewin's Canal Section		✓	1.34	3.3	SO936876	1990	Map
Bromsgrove Road Cutting		✓	0.2	0.5	SO971835	1990	Map
Clayhanger	✓		23.8	58.8	SK034045	1986	Map
Daw End Railway Cutting		✓	8.1	20.9	SK035002	1986	Map
Doulton's Claypit		✓	3.3	8.2	SO936870	1986	Map
Edgbaston Pool	✓		15.6	38.5	SP054841	1986	Map
Fens Pools	✓		37.6	92.9	SO920886	1989	Map
Hay Head Quarry		✓	5.8	14.3	SP048987	1986	Map
Herald Way Marsh	✓	✓	10.6	26.2	SP380769	1988	Map
Illey Pastures	✓		3.5	8.6	SO977812	1989	Map
Jockey Fields	✓		18.05	44.5	SK041030	1994	Map
Ketley Claypit		✓	13.7	33.9	SO898888	1990	Map
Monkspath Meadow	✓		1.2	3.0	SP145763	1986	Map
River Blythe^{[F]}	✓	✓	102.2	252.5	SP109729–SP212916	1989	Map
Stubbers Green Bog	✓		3.0	7.4	SK046016	1986	Map
Sutton Park	✓		866.1	2,140.1	SP098974	1987	Map
Swan Pool & The Swag	✓		5.7	14.0	SK040019	1986	Map
Tile Hill Wood	✓	✓	29.4	72.6	SP279790	1986	Map
Turner's Hill		✓	1.5	3.7	SO909918	1989	Map
Webster's Claypit		✓	0.3	0.8	SP340805	1986	Map
Wren's Nest		✓	34.1	84.3	SO937920	1990	Map

== See also ==
- List of SSSIs by Area of Search
- List of Sites of Special Scientific Interest in Warwickshire
- List of Sites of Special Scientific Interest in Staffordshire
- List of conservation areas in the West Midlands

== Notes ==
^{A} Data rounded to one decimal place.
^{B} Grid reference is based on the British national grid reference system, also known as OSGB36, and is the system used by the Ordnance Survey.
^{C} Those SSSIs with more than one OS grid reference are composed of multiple sections, separated by non-SSSI land.
^{D} Site notification consists of designating a site as an SSSI and consulting with the owner(s). This list uses the date notified under Section 28 of the Wildlife and Countryside Act 1981.
^{E} Link to maps using the Nature on the Map service provided by Natural England.
^{F} The River Blythe site extends into the county of Warwickshire and so can be found on the list of SSSIs in Warwickshire.
