= Law of Property (Miscellaneous Provisions) Act 1989 =

Act of the Parliament of the United Kingdom

Law of Property (Miscellaneous Provisions) Act 1989 (Note: Section 6(1).)
- Act of Parliament
- Parliament of the United Kingdom
- Long title: An Act to make new provision with respect to deeds and their execution and contracts for the sale or other disposition of interests in land; and to abolish the rule of law known as the rule in Bain v. Fothergill.
- Citation: 1989 c. 34
- Territorial extent: England and Wales (Note: Section 6(2).)

Dates
- Royal assent: 27 July 1989
- Commencement: 27 September 1989 (in part); 31 July 1990 (remainder); (Note: Section 5. The Law of Property (Miscellaneous Provisions) Act 1989 (Commencement) Order 1990 (SI 1990/1175).)

Other legislation
- Amends: Law of Property Act 1925; Powers of Attorney Act 1971; Solicitors Act 1974; See § Repealed enactments
- Amended by: Trusts of Land and Appointment of Trustees Act 1996; Financial Services and Markets Act 2000 (Consequential Amendments and Repeals) Order 2001; Regulatory Reform (Execution of Deeds and Documents) Order 2005; Financial Services and Markets Act 2000 (Regulated Activities) (Amendment) (No. 2) Order 2006; Legal Services Act 2007; Financial Services and Markets Act 2000 (Regulated Activities) (Amendment) Order 2009

Status: Amended

Text of statute as originally enacted

Revised text of statute as amended

Text of the Law of Property (Miscellaneous Provisions) Act 1989 as in force today (including any amendments) within the United Kingdom, from legislation.gov.uk.

The Law of Property (Miscellaneous Provisions) Act 1989 (c. 34) is an act of the Parliament of the United Kingdom, which laid down a number of significant revisions to English property law.

== Nature of reforms ==
The act introduced several distinct reforms:

- The common law rules governing the form and delivery of a deed were abolished, and were replaced by requirements that:
  - a deed is valid only when expressed as such,
  - it is either signed by an individual in the presence of a witness who attests to it, or at his direction and attested by two witnesses, and
  - it is delivered as a deed by him or a person authorised to do so on his behalf.

Former rules of law which specified that a seal was needed for the valid execution of an instrument as a deed by an individual were abolished by section 1(1)(b).

- Contracts for the sale or other disposition of an interest in land must be made in writing, and they must incorporate all agreed terms in "one document or, where contracts are exchanged, in each". Section 2 in part reads:

(1) A contract for the sale or other disposition of an interest in land can only be made in writing and only by incorporating all the terms which the parties have expressly agreed in one document or, where contracts are exchanged, in each.
(2) The terms may be incorporated in a document either by being set out in it or by reference to some other document.
(3) The document incorporating the terms or, where contracts are exchanged, one of the documents incorporating them (but not necessarily the same one) must be signed by or on behalf of each party to the contract.

- The rule of law known as the rule in Bain v. Fothergill (where, in an action for breach of contract for the sale of land because of failure of title without fraud, the plaintiff may recover his expenses but not consequential damages for loss of the benefit of the bargain) was abolished. In registered land since the Land Registration Act 2002 such actions no longer occur due to the guarantee of title of the Land Registry where no fraud has been carried out or contributed to by the seller/transferor. In unregistered land (less than 16% of land) it is the policy that as in other areas of law the purchaser/recipient of land, entitled to good title, should be compensated as the court sees fit, subject to specific binding precedent decisions, without such an absolute bar on damages.

== Subsequent jurisprudence ==
=== Validity of execution under Mercury ===
S. 1(3) of the act provides that:

An instrument is validly executed as a deed by an individual if, and only if—

(a) it is signed—

(i) by him in the presence of a witness who attests the signature; or
(ii) at his direction and in his presence and the presence of two witnesses who each attest the signature; and

(b) it is delivered as a deed by him or a person authorised to do so on his behalf.

In its 2008 decision in the Mercury Tax Group case, the High Court of England and Wales expressed in obiter that the recycling of signature pages from earlier drafts rendered the agreements in question invalid as deeds under the Act. Taken together with previous jurisprudence on the execution of documents in the Court of Appeal for England and Wales, the Law Society of England and Wales has issued guidance as to what steps are necessary in order to validly execute deeds and other documents executed in counterpart in electronic or virtual signings or closings:

Available methods of execution by type of document
| Type of Document | Option 1- Return entire PDF/Word document plus signature page | Option 2 - Return signature page only | Option 3 - Advance pre-signed signature pages |
|---|---|---|---|
| Deeds | Yes | No | No |
| Real estate contracts | Yes | No | No |
| Guarantees (stand-alone or contained in simple contracts) | Yes | Yes | Yes |
| Simple contracts (not incorporating any of the above) | Yes | Yes | Yes |

=== Land contracts ===
Section 2 deals with contracts for the creation or sale of legal estates or interests in land, and not with documents that transfer such estates or interests.

The Court of Appeal has noted which types of agreements fall either within the Act or outside of it:

... Section 2 is concerned with contracts for the creation or sale of legal estates or interests in land, not with documents which actually create or transfer such estates or interests. So a contract to transfer a freehold or a lease in the future, a contract to grant a lease in the future, or a contract for a mortgage in the future, are all within the reach of the section, provided of course the ultimate subject matter is land. However, an actual transfer, conveyance or assignment, an actual lease, or an actual mortgage are not within the scope of section 2 at all.

The "single document" requirement is strictly applied: Lord Justice Rimer observed in Keay & Anor v Morris Homes (West Midlands) Ltd. (2012) regarding section 2(1) that:

... Its effect is merciless. An appropriately signed document purporting to amount to a contract for the sale or other disposition of an interest in land will not in fact create a valid contract unless it includes all the expressly agreed terms of the sale or other disposition. If it fails do so it will be void...

The Court has given guidance on circumstances where a land contract can be avoided under s. 2:

1. A party seeking to avoid must identify a term which the parties have expressly agreed, which is not to be found in the single, or exchanged, signed document.
2. It is not sufficient merely to show that the land contract formed part of a larger transaction which was subject to other expressly agreed terms which are absent from the land contract.
3. The expressly agreed term must, if it is required by section 2 to be included in the single document, be a term of the sale of the land, rather than a term of some simultaneous contract (whether for the sale of a chattel or the provision of a service) which happens to take place at the same time as the land contract, and to form part of one commercial transaction.
4. S. 2(1) does not prohibit parties from structuring a transaction, for example, for the sale of the whole of a company's assets, in such a way that the land sale is dealt with in a different document from the sale of stock, work in progress or goodwill, unless the sale of the land is conditional upon the sale of the other assets.

=== Proprietary estoppel ===
Section 2 of the Act also repealed s. 40 of the Law of Property Act 1925, thus abolishing the equitable doctrine of part performance with respect to dispositions of interests in land, which had been recommended by the Law Commission of England and Wales. Although the Commission believed that the equitable doctrines of promissory estoppel and proprietary estoppel would still be available to provide relief, the House of Lords has subsequently held that such relief was not available. As Lord Scott of Foscote stated in his speech:

29.... proprietary estoppel cannot be prayed in aid in order to render enforceable an agreement that statute has declared to be void. The proposition that an owner of land can be estopped from asserting that an agreement is void for want of compliance with the requirements of section 2 is, in my opinion, unacceptable. The assertion is no more than the statute provides. Equity can surely not contradict the statute....

This mirrors the observation that "The doctrine of estoppel may not be invoked to render valid a transaction which the legislature has, on grounds of general public policy, enacted is to be invalid," which has been cited in other cases in the matter by the Court of Appeal. The constructive trust remedy that is available under s. 2(5) of the Act, however, operates under principles distinct from those of estoppel, which can lead to problems in application and enforcement. Academic discussion suggests that estoppel may still be available in situations outside of s. 2 on its own terms.

== Repealed enactments ==
Section 4 of the act repealed 5 enactments, listed in schedule 2 to the act.

| Citation | Short title | Extent of repeal |
|---|---|---|
| 15 & 16 Geo. 5. c. 20 | Law of Property Act 1925 | Section 40. |
| 15 & 16 Geo. 5. c. 20 | Law of Property Act 1925 | Section 73. |
| 15 & 16 Geo. 5. c. 20 | Law of Property Act 1925 | In section 74(3), the words "and in the case of a deed by affixing his own seal,". |
| 1971 c. 27 | Powers of Attorney Act 1971 | Section 1(2). |
| 1971 c. 27 | Powers of Attorney Act 1971 | In section 7, subsection (1), the words "and seal" and in subsection (2), the words "or (4)". |

== See also ==
- English property law
- English contract law
