= List of regulatory reform orders =

This is a complete list of regulatory reform orders made in the United Kingdom since 2001. Regulatory reform orders are laws made under the framework of delegated legislation in the United Kingdom, a form of secondary legislation, under powers granted by the Regulatory Reform Act 2001, the Legislative and Regulatory Reform Act 2006 and the Enterprise and Regulatory Reform Act 2013.

The listing is ordered by year, and then by reference number.

SI = statutory instrument

== Orders under the 2001 Act ==
- SI 2001/3937 The Regulatory Reform (Special Occasions Licensing) Order 2001 (revoked)
- SI 2002/906 The Regulatory Reform (Voluntary Aided Schools Liabilities and Funding) (England) Order 2002
- SI 2002/1062 The Regulatory Reform (Golden Jubilee Licensing) Order 2002 (revoked)
- SI 2002/1457 The Regulatory Reform (Carer’s Allowance) Order 2002
- SI 2002/1592 The Regulatory Reform (Vaccine Damage Payments Act 1979) Order 2002
- SI 2002/1860 The Regulatory Reform (Housing Assistance) (England and Wales) Order 2002
- SI 2002/3203 The Regulatory Reform (Removal of 20 Member Limit in Partnerships etc.) Order 2002
- SI 2002/3205 The Regulatory Reform (Special Occasions Licensing) Order 2002 (revoked)
- SI 2003/256 The Regulatory Reform (Credit Unions) Order 2003
- SI 2003/259 The Regulatory Reform (Assured Periodic Tenancies) (Rent Increases) Order 2003
- SI 2003/940 The Regulatory Reform (Housing Management Agreements) Order 2003
- SI 2003/986 The Regulatory Reform (Schemes under Section 129 of the Housing Act 1988) (England) Order 2003
- SI 2003/1281 The Regulatory Reform (Sugar Beet Research and Education) Order 2003
- SI 2003/1545 The Regulatory Reform (British Waterways Board) Order 2003
- SI 2003/3096 The Regulatory Reform (Business Tenancies) (England and Wales) Order 2003
- SI 2003/3275 The Regulatory Reform (Gaming Machines) Order 2003
- SI 2004/470 The Regulatory Reform (Sunday Trading) Order 2004
- SI 2004/1939 The Regulatory Reform (Museum of London) (Location of Premises) Order 2004
- SI 2004/2357 The Regulatory Reform (Patents) Order 2004
- SI 2004/2359 The Regulatory Reform (Local Commissioner for Wales) Order 2004
- SI 2005/55 The Regulatory Reform (Unsolicited Goods and Services Act 1971) (Directory Entries and Demands for Payment) Order 2005
- SI 2005/634 The Regulatory Reform (Joint Nature Conservation Committee) Order 2005
- SI 2005/871 The Regulatory Reform (Trading Stamps) Order 2005
- SI 2005/908 The Regulatory Reform (Prison Officers) (Industrial Action) Order 2005
- SI 2005/1074 The Regulatory Reform (National Health Service Charitable and Non-Charitable Trust Accounts and Audit) Order 2005
- SI 2005/1541 The Regulatory Reform (Fire Safety) Order 2005
- SI 2005/1906 The Regulatory Reform (Execution of Deeds and Documents) Order 2005
- SI 2006/484 The Regulatory Reform (Fire Safety) Subordinate Provisions Order 2006
- SI 2006/780 The Regulatory Reform (Forestry) Order 2006
- SI 2006/1974 The Regulatory Reform (Registered Designs) Order 2006
- SI 2006/2805 The Regulatory Reform (Agricultural Tenancies) (England and Wales) Order 2006
- SI 2007/1889 The Regulatory Reform (Collaboration etc. between Ombudsmen) Order 2007
- SI 2007/1973 The Regulatory Reform (Financial Services and Markets Act 2000) Order 2007
- SI 2007/2007 The Regulatory Reform (Game) Order 2007
- SI 2007/2183 The Regulatory Reform (Deer) (England and Wales) Order 2007
- SI 2018/454 The Regulatory Reform (Fire Safety) (Custodial Premises) Subordinate Provisions Order 2018

== Orders under the 2006 Act ==
- SI 2007/3224 The Secretaries of State for Children, Schools and Families, for Innovation, Universities and Skills and for Business, Enterprise and Regulatory Reform Order 2007
- SI 2007/3544 The Legislative and Regulatory Reform (Regulatory Functions) Order 2007
- SI 2007/3548 The Legislative and Regulatory Reform Code of Practice (Appointed Day) Order 2007
- SI 2008/960 The Legislative Reform (Health and Safety Executive) Order 2008
- SI 2008/2826 The Legislative Reform (Consumer Credit) Order 2008
- SI 2008/2840 The Legislative Reform (Local Authority Consent Requirements) (England and Wales) Order 2008
- SI 2008/3001 The Legislative Reform (Lloyd’s) Order 2008
- SI 2008/3262 The Legislative Reform (Verification of Weighing and Measuring Equipment) Order 2008
- SI 2009/864 The Legislative Reform (Insolvency) (Advertising Requirements) Order 2009
- SI 2009/1375 The Legislative Reform (Local Government) (Animal Health Functions) Order 2009
- SI 2009/1724 The Legislative Reform (Supervision of Alcohol Sales in Church and Village Halls &c.) Order 2009
- SI 2009/1772 The Legislative Reform (Minor Variations to Premises Licences and Club Premises Certificates) Order 2009
- SI 2009/1940 The Legislative Reform (Limited Partnerships) Order 2009
- SI 2009/2981 The Legislative and Regulatory Reform (Regulatory Functions) (Amendment) Order 2009
- SI 2010/18 The Legislative Reform (Insolvency) (Miscellaneous Provisions) Order 2010
- SI 2010/64 The Legislative Reform (Revocation of Prescribed Form of Penalty Notice for Disorderly Behaviour) Order 2010
- SI 2010/839 The Legislative Reform (Dangerous Wild Animals) (Licensing) Order 2010
- SI 2010/2452 The Legislative Reform (Licensing) (Interim Authority Notices etc) Order 2010
- SI 2010/3028 The Legislative and Regulatory Reform (Regulatory Functions) (Amendment) Order 2010
- SI 2011/1761 The Legislative Reform (Epping Forest) Order 2011
- SI 2011/2687 The Legislative Reform (Industrial and Provident Societies and Credit Unions) Order 2011
- SI 2012/1879 The Legislative Reform (Annual Review of Local Authorities) Order 2012
- SI 2012/3100 The Legislative Reform (Civil Partnership) Order 2012
- SI 2013/103 The Legislative Reform (Constitution of Veterinary Surgeons Preliminary Investigation and Disciplinary Committees) Order 2013
- SI 2013/251 The Legislative Reform (Hallmarking) Order 2013
- SI 2014/542 The Legislative Reform (Overseas Registration of Births and Deaths) Order 2014
- SI 2014/580 The Legislative Reform (Payments by Parish Councils, Community Councils and Charter Trustees) Order 2014
- SI 2014/860 The Legislative and Regulatory Reform (Regulatory Functions) (Amendment) Order 2014
- SI 2014/929 The Legislative and Regulatory Reform Code of Practice (Appointed Day) Order 2014
- SI 2014/1997 The Legislative Reform (Patents) Order 2014
- SI 2014/2436 The Legislative Reform (Clinical Commissioning Groups) Order 2014
- SI 2014/3253 The Legislative Reform (Entertainment Licensing) Order 2014
- SI 2015/998 The Legislative Reform (Community Governance Reviews) Order 2015
- SI 2015/1560 The Legislative Reform (Duchy of Lancaster) Order 2015
- SI 2015/2052 The Legislative Reform (Further Renewal of Radio Licences) Order 2015
- SI 2016/124 The Legislative Reform (Exempt Lotteries) Order 2016
- SI 2017/514 The Legislative Reform (Private Fund Limited Partnerships) Order 2017
- SI 2018/559 The Legislative Reform (Constitution of the Council of the Royal College of Veterinary Surgeons) Order 2018
- SI 2018/1040 The Legislative Reform (Regulator of Social Housing) (England) Order 2018
- SI 2019/1027 The Higher Education and Research Act 2017 (Further Implementation etc.) Regulations 2019
- SI 2020/1526 The Legislative Reform (Renewal of Radio Licences) Order 2020
- SI 2021/408 The Financial Reporting Council (Miscellaneous Provisions) Order 2021
- SI 2022/444 The Legislative Reform (Renewal of National Radio Multiplex Licences) Order 2022
- SI 2022/834 The Legislative Reform (Provision of Information etc. Relating to Disabilities) Order 2022
- SI 2025/993 The Legislative Reform (Disclosure of Adult Social Care Data) Order 2025

== Orders under the 2013 Act ==
- SI 2013/1455 The Enterprise and Regulatory Reform Act 2013 (Commencement No. 1, Transitional Provisions and Savings) Order 2013 (LA)
- SI 2013/1648 The Enterprise and Regulatory Reform Act 2013 (Commencement No. 2) Order 2013 (LA)
- SI 2013/1666 The Enterprise and Regulatory Reform Act 2013 (Health and Safety) (Consequential Amendments) Order 2013 (LA)
- SI 2013/1854 The Enterprise and Regulatory Reform Act 2013 (Broadcasting Consequential Amendments) Order 2013 (LA)
- SI 2013/1956 The Enterprise and Regulatory Reform Act 2013 (Consequential Amendments) (Employment) Order 2013 (LA)
- SI 2013/2146 The Enterprise and Regulatory Reform Act 2013 (Abolition of Conservation Area Consent) (Consequential and Saving Provisions) (England) Order 2013 (LA)
- SI 2013/2227 The Enterprise and Regulatory Reform Act 2013 (Commencement No. 3, Transitional Provisions and Savings) Order 2013 (LA)
- SI 2013/2268 The Enterprise and Regulatory Reform Act 2013 (Competition and Markets Authority) (Consequential Amendments) Order 2013 (LA)
- SI 2013/2271 The Enterprise and Regulatory Reform Act 2013 (Commencement No. 1, Transitional Provisions and Savings) (Amendment) Order 2013 (LA)
- SI 2013/2880 The Enterprise and Regulatory Reform (Designation of the UK Green Investment Bank) Order 2013 (LA)
- SI 2013/2979 The Enterprise and Regulatory Reform Act 2013 (Commencement No. 4 and Saving Provision) Order 2013
- SI 2014/253 The Enterprise and Regulatory Reform Act 2013 (Commencement No. 5, Transitional Provisions and Savings) Order 2014
- SI 2014/386 The Enterprise and Regulatory Reform Act 2013 (Consequential Amendments) (Employment) Order 2014
- SI 2014/416 The Enterprise and Regulatory Reform Act 2013 (Commencement No. 6, Transitional Provisions and Savings) Order 2014
- SI 2014/549 The Enterprise and Regulatory Reform Act 2013 (Competition) (Consequential, Transitional and Saving Provisions) (No. 2) Order 2014
- SI 2014/553 The Enterprise and Regulatory Reform Act 2013 (Listed Buildings Certificate of Lawfulness) (Hearings and Inquiries Procedures) (Consequential Amendments) (England) Order 2014
- SI 2014/824 The Enterprise and Regulatory Reform Act 2013 (Commencement No. 4 and Saving Provision) (Amendment) Order 2014
- SI 2014/853 The Enterprise and Regulatory Reform Act 2013 (Consequential Amendments) (Employment) (No. 2) Order 2014
- SI 2014/892 The Enterprise and Regulatory Reform Act 2013 (Competition) (Consequential, Transitional and Saving Provisions) Order 2014
- SI 2014/2481 The Enterprise and Regulatory Reform Act 2013 (Commencement No. 7 and Amendment) Order 2014
- SI 2015/16 The Enterprise and Regulatory Reform Act 2013 (Amendment) (Gas and Electricity Appeals) Regulations 2015
- SI 2015/641 The Enterprise and Regulatory Reform Act 2013 (Commencement No. 8 and Saving Provisions) Order 2015 (revoked)
- SI 2016/191 The Enterprise and Regulatory Reform Act 2013 (Commencement No. 9 and Saving Provisions) Order 2016
- SI 2016/481 The Enterprise and Regulatory Reform Act 2013 (Consequential Amendments) (Bankruptcy) and the Small Business, Enterprise and Employment Act 2015 (Consequential Amendments) Regulations 2016
- SI 2016/593 The Enterprise and Regulatory Reform Act 2013 (Commencement No. 10 and Saving Provisions) Order 2016
