= Statutory instrument (UK) =

Type of secondary legislation in the United Kingdom

A statutory instrument (SI) is the principal form in which delegated legislation is made in the United Kingdom.

Statutory instruments are governed by the Statutory Instruments Act 1946. They replaced statutory rules and orders, made under the Rules Publication Act 1893, in 1948.

Most delegated legislation in Great Britain is made in the form of a statutory instrument (in Northern Ireland, delegated legislation is organised into statutory rules, rather than statutory instruments.) The advent of devolution in 1999 resulted in many powers to make statutory instruments being transferred to the Scottish and Welsh governments, and oversight to the Scottish Parliament and Senedd. Instruments made by the Scottish Government are now classed separately as Scottish statutory instruments. Instruments made by the Welsh Government are now classed separately as Welsh statutory instruments.

== When a statutory instrument is required ==
A statutory instrument is used when an act of Parliament passed after 1947 confers a power to make, confirm or approve delegated legislation on:

1. the king and states that it is to be exercisable by Order in Council; or
2. a minister of the Crown and states that it is to be exercisable by statutory instrument.

Minister of the Crown includes the Welsh Ministers and various acts provide that delegated legislation, although made by another person (for example, the General Dental Council), is also to be made by statutory instrument. Often the minister authorised to issue a statutory instrument is "the Secretary of State", which the Interpretation Act 1978 defines as "[any] one of Her Majesty's Principal Secretaries of State"; this form effectively allows the Prime Minister to create new departments and define or redefine their responsibilities at will.

A statutory instrument is also used when the King in Council or a minister exercises a power under an act passed before 1947 which is legislative, rather than executive, in character.

Use of a statutory instrument is not required where the parent act does not specify it. This may be the case where delegated legislation is of only limited application and therefore not of general importance. Instead, other provisions may be made for publishing the legislation. So, for example, an order providing for the transfer of contracts from one National Health Service body to another may only be notified to the affected bodies, and by-laws made by a local council may be publicised through an announcement in local newspapers.

== Features ==
The main effect of delegated legislation being made by statutory instrument is that it is effective as soon as it is made, numbered, catalogued, printed, made available for sale and published on the Internet. This ensures that the public has easy access to the new laws.

Numbers are assigned by His Majesty's Stationery Office and are sequential within the year of making. The number provides a means of citing the statutory instrument in addition to the title given by the instrument itself. So, for example, the Income Tax (Exemption of Minor Benefits) (Amendment) Regulations 2003 are numbered and may be cited as SI 2003 No. 1434 or SI 2003/1434.

In addition to the main numbering system, there are a number of subsidiary numbering systems which may indicate an instrument's position within a particular series of instruments (in the following list n indicates the number):

- (C n): Commencement and/or appointed-day orders which bring into force an act or part of an act.
- (L n): legal series: relating to fees or procedures in courts in England and Wales.
- (S n): Scottish series: instruments made by the United Kingdom Government which apply to Scotland only (these are different from Scottish statutory instruments made by the Scottish Government under its devolved powers).
- (NI n): Northern Ireland series: Orders in Council made by the United Kingdom Government under its "direct rule" powers (delegated legislation made by Northern Ireland Departments is made by statutory rules).
- (W n): Wales series: statutory instruments made by the Welsh Government and applying to Wales only. Welsh language versions are numbered (Cy n).

Statutory instruments will be classified by subject heading in the annual edition printed by His Majesty's Stationery Office.

Printed copies of a statutory instrument will generally be on sale within a week of the date it is made.

== Parliamentary control ==
Most statutory instruments (SIs) are subject to one of two forms of control by Parliament, depending on what is specified in the parent act. Parliament's control is limited to approving, or rejecting, the instrument as laid before it: it cannot (except in very rare cases) amend or change it. Whether or not a statutory instrument is subject to affirmative or negative resolution procedure is dictated by the parent act.

=== Negative resolution procedure ===
The more common form of control is the negative resolution procedure. This requires that the instrument is either:

- laid before Parliament in draft, and can be made once 40 days (excluding any time during which Parliament is dissolved or prorogued, or during which both Houses are adjourned for more than four days) have passed unless either House passes a resolution disapproving it, or
- laid before Parliament after it is made (but before it comes into force), but will be revoked if either House passes a resolution annulling it within 40 days.

A motion to annul a statutory instrument is known as a "prayer" and uses the following wording:

That an humble address be presented to His Majesty praying that the [name of statutory instrument] be annulled.

Any member of either House can put down a motion that an instrument should be annulled, although in the Commons, unless the motion is signed by a large number of Members, or is moved by the official Opposition, it is unlikely to be debated, and in the Lords such a motion is seldom actually voted upon.

If a resolution to annul an instrument is passed, it will be revoked by the king through an Order-in-Council. Between the date of the resolution to annul and the date when the Order-in-Council is made, the instrument remains law but ineffective. Anything done under the instrument whilst it was in force remains valid, and the Government is free to make a new statutory instrument.

The last occasion on which a statutory instrument was annulled was on 22 February 2000, when the House of Lords passed a motion to annul the Greater London Authority Elections Rules (SI 2000/208). The last time the House of Commons annulled a statutory instrument was in 1979 when it rejected the Paraffin (Maximum Retail Prices) (Revocation) Order 1979 (SI 1979/797).

=== Affirmative resolution procedure ===
Statutory instruments which are subject to affirmative resolution are less common, making up about 10% of the total. This is the more stringent form of parliamentary control as it requires positive approval, rather than the absence of a decision to annul. Accordingly, it is used where the delegated legislation may be more controversial.

The parent act may require that the proposed statutory instrument be approved by both Houses of Parliament (or, in the case of an instrument which relates to financial matters, by the House of Commons only) either:

- before it is made (i.e. in draft form),
- after it is made, but before it can come into force, or
- after it is made and has come into force, but it cannot remain in force for longer than a specified period (usually 28 days, excluding periods when Parliament is dissolved, prorogued or adjourned for more than four days) unless approved within that period.

Once the instrument is laid before Parliament, the government will move a motion in each House that the instrument be approved.

The last time a draft statutory instrument subject to affirmative procedure was not approved by the House of Commons was on 12 November 1969 when the House rejected four draft orders relating to parliamentary constituencies.

=== Regulatory reform orders and legislative reform orders ===
The Regulatory Reform Act 2001 enables the government to make an order to change acts of Parliament so as to remove burdens on business or others, so long as it can be done without removing "necessary protections". Because of the extensive powers given to the government to amend primary legislation as part of the act, a special form of affirmative procedure has been introduced.

Firstly, the government must produce a draft proposal and consult interested organisations. It must then lay the proposal and the results of the consultation, along with a detailed explanation, before Parliament for 60 days. select committees of both Houses then debate the proposal and examine it against criteria including maintenance of "necessary protection" for those who may be affected, the adequacy of public consultation, the extent of the burden to be lifted, financial implications and compliance with European law. The committees then report their findings to the House. The government has to take those findings into account when deciding whether to proceed with the proposal. If it does, it then lays a draft order before Parliament along with an explanation of any changes made, which is again considered by the committees before finally being put to a vote of each House for approval.

One example of the use of regulatory reform orders have included the Regulatory Reform (Sunday Trading) Order 2004 (SI 2004/470) which repealed section 26 of the Revenue Act 1889, and so re-legalised the selling of methylated spirits on a Saturday night or a Sunday. Another example is the Regulatory Reform (Trading Stamps) Order 2005 (SI 2005/871) which repealed the entirety of the Trading Stamps Act 1964.

The Regulatory Reform Act 2001 was repealed and replaced by the Legislative and Regulatory Reform Act 2006, which created significantly wider powers and has been the subject of considerable concern. The powers have been described by David Howarth MP as the "Abolition of Parliament Bill" and by Daniel Finkelstein as the "Bill to End All Bills".

=== Remedial orders under the Human Rights Act 1998 ===
The Human Rights Act 1998 created a procedure under which, if the courts find that an act of Parliament contravenes the European Convention on Human Rights, the government can make a remedial order to correct the act in question.

Before making a remedial order, the government must lay a proposal before Parliament for 60 days, during which time it will be considered and reported upon by the Joint Committee of both Houses on Human Rights. After the 60 days have passed, the government may then lay a draft order before Parliament, following which there is another 60-day period in which the joint committee will make a recommendation to both Houses whether the order should be approved.

An emergency procedure allows for remedial orders to be made immediately and debated afterwards; they must be approved within 120 days or will cease to have effect.

=== Henry VIII clauses ===
Some statutory instruments are made under provisions of acts which allow the instrument to change the parent act itself, or to change other primary legislation. These provisions, allowing primary legislation to be amended by secondary legislation, are known as Henry VIII clauses in reference to the Proclamation by the Crown Act 1539. After the enactment of the Nationality, Immigration and Asylum Act 2002 (which permitted the Secretary of State to make changes using Henry VIII powers), the Delegated Powers and Regulatory Reform Select Committee of the House of Lords issued a report concerning the use and drafting of such clauses, which its chairman remarked go "right to the heart of the key constitutional question of the limits of executive power". Such clauses have often proved controversial, because they allow changes to the law without a vote in Parliament at any stage.

Lord Judge spoke strongly against such clauses when he was Lord Chief Justice of England and Wales: "You can be sure that when these Henry VIII clauses are introduced they will always be said to be necessary. William Pitt warned us how to treat such a plea with disdain. 'Necessity is the justification for every infringement of human liberty: it is the argument of tyrants, the creed of slaves.'"

The government (specifically the Department for Business, Energy and Industrial Strategy) controversially used Henry VIII powers to abolish EU rules on state aid (which had been incorporated into UK domestic law after Brexit). In 2021, the Good Law Project challenged this move, arguing that the use of Henry VIII powers for such a purpose is constitutionally questionable, but they withdrew their challenge before it was heard.

=== Supervision by parliamentary committees ===
There are three committees which have a general supervisory role in relation to statutory instruments.

The Joint Committee on Statutory Instruments (a committee of both Houses of Parliament) checks that an instrument is being made in accordance with the powers granted to the Minister making it. It does not consider the policy of instruments, but is concerned only with technical matters. The joint committee may draw the attention of both Houses to an instrument if it:

- imposes a cost on the public finances,
- requires payments of fees to a public authority,
- is made under powers which prevent it from being challenged in the courts,
- attempts to have retrospective effect (i.e. to change the law from a date before the date on which it is made) when the parent act does not explicitly empower it to do so,
- makes an unexpected or unusual use of the powers conferred by the parent act, or it may be ultra vires (outside the powers granted by the parent act, and so unlawful),
- requires further explanation,
- has been published or laid before Parliament late, or
- appears to contain mistakes.

Where an instrument is required to be laid before the House of Commons only, then the Commons' Select Committee on Statutory Instruments undertakes a similar examination.

The House of Lords Committee on the Merits of Statutory Instruments considers the policy of statutory instruments and would draw the attention of the House of Lords to a statutory instrument if it:

- is politically or legally important,
- is no longer appropriate due to changes in circumstances since the parent act was passed,
- implements European law inappropriately, or
- fails to achieve its intended purpose.

In addition, the House of Commons may refer a statutory instrument to a standing committee for detailed debate on the merits of the legislation if a motion to annul (in the case of an instrument subject to negative resolution) or approve (in the case of an instrument subject to affirmative resolution) is made. The committee will report its conclusions to the House which will then vote on the motion to annul or approve (as the case may be).

=== Instruments not subject to parliamentary control ===
Most acts of Parliament stipulate that their provisions shall not come into force until a date to be fixed by one or more commencement orders made by the government, thereby giving the authorities time to make necessary preparations. Commencement orders are laid before Parliament but are not subject to either the affirmative or negative procedure.

Many statutory instruments (indeed, the largest group after those subject to the negative resolution procedure) are not required to be laid before Parliament at all, and are therefore not subject to any parliamentary control.

== Judicial controls ==
As with all delegated legislation, because statutory instruments are made by a person exercising a power conferred by an act of Parliament for a specified purpose, rather than by Parliament exercising its sovereign law-making powers, they can be struck down by the courts if it is concluded that they are ultra vires (literally, "beyond the powers" conferred by the parent act). This would be the case if the government attempts to use delegated legislation for a purpose not envisioned by the parent act, or if the legislation is an unreasonable use of the power conferred by the act, or if pre-conditions imposed by the act (for example, consultation with certain organisations) have not been satisfied.

In 1987, the case re Woolwich Equitable Building Society led the courts to strike down SI 1986 No 482 regulation 11 which related to payments of dividends by building societies. More recently the Court of Appeal struck down SI 2014 No 2604, known as the Fast Track Rules, which relates to asylum appeals. This was held to be ultra vires Tribunals, Courts and Enforcement Act 2007 section 22.

== See also ==
- List of statutory instruments of the United Kingdom
- Scottish statutory instrument
- Welsh statutory instrument
- Northern Ireland statutory rule
- Halsbury's Statutory Instruments
- Ministerial order (United Kingdom)
- Ministerial direction

== Bibliography ==
- Statutory Instrument Practice, 3rd edition (June 2003), Cabinet Office and His Majesty's Stationery Office
- House of Commons Information Office Factsheet L7 - Statutory Instruments
- Guide to SIs and other forms of delegated powers to Government Departments from the House of Lords's Delegated Powers and Regulatory Reform Committee, April 2005.
- Post from June 2005 to UK-Crypto discussing specific SIs.
