= Legislative and Regulatory Reform Act 2006 =

Act of the Parliament of the United Kingdom

Legislative and Regulatory Reform Act 2006 (Note: Section 35.)
- Act of Parliament
- Parliament of the United Kingdom
- Long title: An Act to enable provision to be made for the purpose of removing or reducing burdens resulting from legislation and promoting regulatory principles; to make provision about the exercise of regulatory functions; to make provision about the interpretation of legislation relating to the European Communities and the European Economic Area; to make provision relating to section 2(2) of the European Communities Act 1972; and for connected purposes.
- Citation: 2006 c. 51
- Territorial extent: United Kingdom (Note: Section 34.)

Dates
- Royal assent: 8 November 2006
- Commencement: 8 January 2007 (Note: Section 33.)
Other legislation
Amends	Regulatory Reform Act 2001; Human Fertilisation and Embryology (Deceased Fathers) Act 2003; Statute Law (Repeals) Act 2004; Railways Act 2005; Wireless Telegraphy Act 2006
Amended by	Postal Services Act 2011; Wales Act 2017

Status: Amended

History of passage through Parliament

Text of statute as originally enacted

Revised text of statute as amended

The Legislative and Regulatory Reform Act 2006 (c. 51) (LRRA) is an act of the Parliament of the United Kingdom. It was enacted to replace the Regulatory Reform Act 2001 (RRA). The act was and remains very controversial, because of a perception that it is an enabling act substantially removing the ancient British constitutional restriction on the Executive introducing and altering laws without assent or scrutiny by Parliament, and it has been called the Abolition of Parliament Act.

== Passage through Parliament ==
The bill which became the Act was brought before the House of Commons of the United Kingdom in early 2006. As originally drafted, the Bill was controversial, as it would have granted government ministers wide powers to make secondary legislation that could amend, repeal or replace any primary legislation or secondary legislation (known as a Henry VIII clause). The government proposed numerous amendments to the Bill on 4 May 2006 and 10 May 2006, to address certain criticisms of the Bill's scope and lack of safeguards.

The Bill received its third reading in the House of Commons on 16 May 2006, and moved to the House of Lords. After its first and second readings, the bill was reported with amendments on 19 July 2006, before the summer recess. Its report stage in the House of Lords took place on 26 October 2006, and it received royal assent on 8 November 2006.

=== Part 1: Power to reform legislation ===
The first part of the bill, entitled "Power to reform legislation", permits a government minister to make statutory instruments to amend legislation, to "make any provision which he considers would serve the purpose in subsection (2)": "That purpose is removing or reducing any burden, or the overall burdens, resulting directly or indirectly for any person from any legislation."

The intention declared before the act was passed was to reform legislation perceived to be "outdated, unnecessary or over-complicated". A similar procedure is possible under the existing RRA, which permits a minister to make Regulatory Reform Orders (RROs). A review of the first four years of operation of the RRA, published by the Cabinet Office in July 2005, concluded that the RRA "presented a number of hurdles which inhibited the production of RROs", its powers were "too technical and limited", and the procedure should be "extended to deliver non-controversial proposals for simplification".

Under clause 1 of the bill, a minister can only make an order for two purposes: "reforming legislation" or "implementing recommendations" made by the Law Commission, the Scottish Law Commission or the Northern Ireland Law Commission, with or without changes. Part of the justification for the bill is that reports of the Law Commissions are often not acted upon for years after they are published. Under clause 2, an order may amend, repeal or replace any primary or secondary legislation.

Before making an order, clause 3 of the bill requires the relevant minister to be satisfied that a legislative change is required to secure the policy objective, that the proposed order is "proportionate", "strikes a fair balance" between the public interest and the interests of any persons adversely affected, does not remove any "necessary protection", and does not prevent anyone from exercising rights or freedoms that they "might reasonably expect to continue to exercise".

The bill contains some express limitations. Clause 5 prevents the bill being used to "impose or increase taxation"; clause 6 prevents orders under the bill being used to create any new criminal offence that is punishable by imprisonment for more than two years; and clause 7 prevents the bill being used to authorise any forcible entry, search or seizure, or compel the giving of evidence (subject to exceptions where merely restating existing legislation, or implementing the recommendations of a Law Commission). Clause 8 prevents orders being made in relation to matters within the legislative competence of the Scottish Parliament, and clause 9 prevents orders being made to alter the functions of the Welsh Assembly without its prior consent.

Ministers are required to consult widely before making an order under the bill, lay a draft of a proposed order before Parliament with an explanatory documents. The draft order may pass through Parliament to become a statutory instrument under the existing "negative resolution" or "affirmative resolution" procedures, or a new "super-affirmative resolution" procedure.

==== Criticism ====
Controversially, the order-making powers in the bill are potentially very wide. Although, for example, the bill (if it is enacted as drafted) cannot be used to introduce new taxes, there is no restriction on the bill being used to amend itself; and the tests that a minister must satisfy before making an order are very subjective. An order would be subject to supervision by the High Court by way of judicial review, but it would be difficult to show that a minister was not "satisfied" that the requirements for making an order were met. In January 2006, the bill was called "potentially one of the most constitutionally significant Bills that has come before the House for some time" by the House of Commons Select Committee on Regulatory Reform; while supporting the move to cut "red tape", the committee asked for extra safeguards to avoid potential "abuse" of the powers in the bill. Earlier in January, the House of Lords Select Committee on the Constitution wrote to the Lord Chancellor to express its concern that the bill could markedly alter the respective and long-established roles of ministers and Parliament in the legislative process, and its disappointment that the bill had not been published in draft.

The bill has been criticised heavily in articles and correspondence published in the press. In The Times, journalist Daniel Finkelstein dubbed it the "Bill to End All Bills", and Liberal Democrat Member of Parliament David Howarth called it the "Abolition of Parliament Bill". The Green Party passed a motion at their conference against the bill, saying "the Bill threatens to shatter the foundations of democracy".

The bill has also been criticised by legal professionals. The Law Society published a briefing note before its Second Reading, expressing concerns that safeguards were too weak, that secondary legislation should not be able to authorise further subordinate legislation, that the powers of non-ministers acting under delegated powers were not restricted, and that there was no procedure for Parliament to challenge use of the bill. In a letter published in The Times, six professors of law at the University of Cambridge wrote that the bill could be used to create a new offence of incitement to religious hatred, punishable by two years' imprisonment; curtail or abolish trial by jury; introduce house arrest; allow the prime minister to sack judges; rewrite the law on nationality and immigration; and "reform" Magna Carta, saying that "It would, in short, create a major shift of powers within the State, which in other countries would require an amendment to the constitution; and one in which the winner would be the executive, and the loser Parliament." Joshua Rozenberg wrote in The Telegraph that Clifford Chance had pointed out that the Bill "usurps the power of Parliament", and David Pannick QC wrote in The Times that the bill "would confer astonishingly broad powers on ministers to make the law of the land".

Barristers Sir Jeremy Lever QC and George Peretz pointed out in a letter to The Times on 23 February 2006 that the Solicitor General told Parliament on 13 July 1972 that the similar powers in section 2(2) of the European Communities Act 1972 would only be used for "consequential amendments of a small, minor and insignificant kind", although they have been used subsequently to implement EC legislation that has made substantial changes to UK law.

An article in The Guardian compared the bill to the Civil Contingencies Act 2004, saying that the bill was presented as modernising measure but actually gave ministers arbitrary powers, taking "another chunk out of our centuries-old democracy". An article published in The Independent in June 2006 that analysed the last nine years of legal reform attacked the Prime Minister and his government, claiming that the numerous changes and laws passed since it has been in power have reduced the power of democracy in the UK; the bill was one example the journalist gave of the kinds of methods being employed to do this.

After the bill completed its committee stage in the House of Commons, it was reported that the House of Commons Procedure Committee had complained that the bill "tips the balance between the executive and Parliament too far in the Government's favour". A second report published by the House of Commons Select Committee on Public Administration on 20 April 2006 stated that, "As currently drafted, the Legislative and Regulatory Reform Bill gives the Government powers which are entirely disproportionate to its stated aims."

In May 2006, the House of Lords Constitution Select Committee published a report which drew attention to a number of issues. The report criticised the manner in which the bill was introduced, commenting that the consultative process was "lamentable", that the bill was not debated on the floor of the House of Commons, as is long accepted practice for bills of first class constitutional importance, and that the late amendments, while welcome, were "something of an indictment of the processes of policy-making and legislation". The report also noted a repetition of the delegation of "unprecedentedly wide power" to ministers, as the Regulatory Reform Act 2001 was described in December 2000; and the further ability for ministers to change legislation to implement recommendations of the Law Commission. The report concluded that the bill, after amendment, was more balanced than before, but remained "over-broad and vaguely drawn", and further safeguards were necessary.

==== Support ====
The government minister responsible, Jim Murphy, said, in winding up the debate on Second Reading on 9 February 2006: "I give the House clear undertakings, which I shall repeat in Committee, that the orders will not be used to implement highly controversial reforms", although there is no such restriction in the text of the bill itself. Barrister Francis Bennion (formerly Parliamentary Counsel, and author of the authoritative Bennion on Statutory Interpretation) wrote in a letter to The Times on 20 February 2006 that "The Bill opens the door to much-needed reforms in what is called lawyer's law".

In May 2006, a report from the House of Lords Select Committee on Delegated Powers and Regulatory Reform found that clause 1 of the bill was "not far different" from the power granted under the Regulatory Reform Act 2001, and so not inappropriate. While recognising the need for sub-delegation of order-making powers in some situations, the report considered that the case for unlimited sub-delegation was sufficiently made out, and that some limits should be imposed, for example, by specifying categories of person (such as local authorities) to whom powers could be delegated. The report found that the powers of Parliamentary supervision in the amended bill were adequate, but the ability for a minister to change the law to implement recommendations of Law Commission or to consolidate and simplify legislation were thought to be inappropriate, saying that "the statute law should be made by Parliament, not by Ministers".

=== Part 2: Regulators ===
Part 2 of the bill, entitled "Regulators", implements recommendations of a review led by Philip Hampton, entitled "Reducing administrative burdens: effective inspection and enforcement", published in the Hampton Report in March 2005. Clause 19 contains two principles that regulators must have regard to when exercising particular regulatory functions: regulatory activities must be carried out in a way which is "transparent, accountable, proportionate and consistent", and should be targeted only at cases in which action is needed. Clause 20 and enables a minister to introduce a mandatory code of practice for regulators.

=== Part 3: European Community legislation ===
Part 3 of the bill, entitled "Legislation Relating to the European Communities etc.", makes provision about legislation relating to the European Communities, to reduce the number of UK statutory instruments required to transpose EU legislation into domestic UK law. These provisions were copied from the European Union Bill which was also before Parliament, but which had made little progress.

=== Procedural history ===
==== House of Commons ====
The bill was introduced in the House of Commons by Jim Murphy, Parliamentary Secretary to the Cabinet Office, on 11 January 2006, becoming Bill 111 of the 2005–06 Parliamentary session. A bill of this nature would usually be introduced by a more senior minister, such as the Chancellor of the Duchy of Lancaster or the Cabinet Office Minister, but a replacement for John Hutton had not been announced in over two months since he was promoted to replace David Blunkett as Secretary of State for Work and Pensions on 2 November 2005. Hilary Armstrong became Chancellor of the Duchy of Lancaster in the Cabinet reshuffle on 5 May 2005.

The bill had its formal first reading on 11 January 2006 and second reading on 9 February 2006, when a programme motion (to curtail debate) and a money resolution were passed. The bill was considered by House of Commons Standing Committee A in eight sittings on 28 February, 2 March, 7 and 9 March 2006. A number of government amendments were agreed, but none of the amendments proposed by the opposition parties were passed.

The Government published proposed amendments to the bill on 4 May 2006 which are intended "to put beyond doubt that the Legislative and Regulatory Reform Bill will only be used to deliver the Government's better regulation agenda". The amendments made substantial changes to the bill, replacing the first two clauses entirely with new clauses under which an order can only be made for the purposes of "removing or reducing any burden" from legislation, or of securing that regulatory activities are "carried out in a way which is transparent, accountable, proportionate and consistent" and are "targeted only at cases in which action is needed", or of implementing the recommendations of a Law Commission. The amendments also add a power for a Committee of either of the Houses of Parliament to prevent a draft order being passed, subject to the Committee being overruled by the relevant House. Further "follow-up" amendments were published on 10 May 2006 to "ensure total clarity on what this Bill is intended to deliver". Amongst other things, the new amendments ensure that the orders under the bill could not be used to amend the bill itself, once it is enacted, nor to amend the Human Rights Act 1998.

The bill was debated on report from the Standing Committee on 15 and 16 May 2006. A number of government amendments were made to implement the changes announced earlier on 4 May, and further opposition amendments were debated but rejected. The bill received its third reading in the House of Commons following the debate on 16 May.

==== House of Lords ====
The bill moved to the House of Lords, where it was presented by Lord Bassam of Brighton and received its formal first reading on 17 May, and House of Lords Bill 109 of the 2005–06 Parliamentary session. It had its Second Reading on 13 June, and it was debated in a Committee of the whole house on 3 July, 10 July and 19 July.

After completing its Committee stage on 19 July, the bill was reported with amendments. The Bill had its report stage in the House of Lords on 26 October, after Parliament returned from its summer recess, and its third reading was held on 3 November.

The Bill received royal assent on 8 November 2006.

== Section 33 – Commencement ==
This section provides that the Act came into force at the end of the period of two months that began on the date on which it was passed. The word "months" means calendar months. The day (that is to say, 8 November 2006) on which the Act was passed (that is to say, received royal assent) is included in the period of two months.

== See also ==
- List of regulatory reform orders
- Enabling act
