= Regulatory Reform Act 2001 =

Act of the Parliament of the United Kingdom

Regulatory Reform Act 2001 (Note: Section 15(1).)
- Act of Parliament
- Parliament of the United Kingdom
- Long title: An Act to enable provision to be made for the purpose of reforming legislation which has the effect of imposing burdens affecting persons in the carrying on of any activity and to enable codes of practice to be made with respect to the enforcement of restrictions, requirements or conditions.
- Citation: 2001 c. 6
- Territorial extent: United Kingdom (Note: Section 15(2).)

Dates
- Royal assent: 4 April 2001
- Commencement: 4 April 2001 (Note: The Acts of Parliament (Commencement) Act 1793.)
Other legislation
Amends	Deregulation and Contracting Out Act 1994
Amended by	Justice (Northern Ireland) Act 2002; Legislative and Regulatory Reform Act 2006

Status: Partially repealed

Text of statute as originally enacted

Revised text of statute as amended

The Regulatory Reform Act 2001 (c. 6) is an act of the Parliament of the United Kingdom. It replaced the Deregulation and Contracting Out Act 1994. It removed some of the constraints on Deregulation Orders under the 1994 act, by providing wider powers for government ministers to make a Regulatory Reform Order by statutory instrument.

The act was introduced to the House of Lords on 7 December 2000, and passed to the House of Commons on 19 March 2001. It passed its Report Stage and Third Reading on 4 April 2001 and was given royal assent on 10 April 2001.

== Contents ==
Under the 2001 act, a government minister could make a Regulatory Reform Order to "[reform] legislation which has the effect of imposing burdens", with a view to removing or reducing the regulatory burdens. The act can only be used to reform existing legislation, so it cannot be used to codify the common law, and can only be used where burdens are removed (although, unlike the 1994 act, new burdens can also be imposed where proportional). An Order cannot be used to remove "necessary protections".

The act was largely replaced by the Legislative and Regulatory Reform Act 2006. The act expands the range of ministerial order-making powers, allowing orders to be made in a wider range of circumstances, more quickly and efficiently, with less consultation and scrutiny.

== Scrutiny of orders ==
The draft Order must be opened to public consultation, reviewed by committees from both Houses of Parliament, and then approved by both Houses. However, unlike a bill, an order is not debated on the floor of either chamber.

In the House of Commons, regulatory reform orders were subject to scrutiny by the Regulatory Reform Select Committee. In the House of Lords, regulatory reform orders were subject to scrutiny by the Regulatory Reform and Delegated Powers Committee.

== See also ==
- List of regulatory reform orders
