= Country Trust =

British education charity

The Country Trust is a British education charity that connects children from areas of high social and economic disadvantage with the land, through visits to the working countryside and by promoting a better understanding of the links between food and farming.

The Country Trust is registered with The Charity Commission no. 1122103, and is a company limited by guarantee, no. 6436266.

The organisation raises money through donations, fundraising initiatives, events and partnerships.

== History ==
The Country Trust was established in 1970 by Lance Coates, owner of Coates printing ink and an organic dairy farmer from Buckinghamshire. Lance's aim was to promote sustainable, organic farming and to champion human health. In 1969, he set up The Lance Coates 1969 Trust alongside an operating charity, The Country Trust. The Country Trust, as resembling its current state, was officially formed in February 1978.

Rodney Stan Ford, the first director of the organisation, alongside his wife Jane Stanford, established farm visits, which to this date are one of the primary programs of the charity, after having visited urban schools in deprived inner city areas and persuading a large network of farmers and estate owners to host visits for the children.

== Current programmes ==
The trust currently offers four programmes.

- Farm Discovery: Visits to real working farms and estates.
- Food Discovery: A yearlong programme to immerse children in all aspects of growing, cooking, tasting and even selling food.
- Farm in a Box: The newest programme Farm in a Box is delivered to schools and involves various hands-on experiences, investigations and activities.
- Countryside Residentials: 2-4 night stays in Yorkshire, Suffolk or Norfolk. Giving children the opportunity to be fully immersed in the countryside.

== Policy, campaigns and alliances ==
The Country Trust works with farmers to ensure continued funding for education access. The charity is listed as a source of guidance and advice by the UK Government for farmers wanting to host visits.

== Donors ==
The Westminster Foundation is one of the major supporters of The Country Trust.

Oxbury Bank has chosen the Country Trust as its ‘Charity of the Year' for 2022.

Warburtons, in partnership with the Country Trust, has sent out more than 400 boxes of 'Discover Wheat Farm in a Box' to more than 10,650 participating students.

The Hiscox Foundation has supported the 'Climate Action Farm in a Box' and currently the 'Soil Campaign'.
