= Wildlife and Countryside Act 1981 =

Act of the Parliament of the United Kingdom

Wildlife and Countryside Act 1981 (Note: Section 74(1).)
- Act of Parliament
- Parliament of the United Kingdom
- Long title: An Act to repeal and re-enact with amendments the Protection of Birds Acts 1954 to 1967 and the Conservation of Wild Creatures and Wild Plants Act 1975; to prohibit certain methods of killing or taking wild animals; to amend the previous legislations relating to protection of certain mammals; to restrict the introduction of certain animals and plants; to amend the Endangered Species (Import and Export) Act 1976; to amend the law relating to nature conservation, the countryside and National Parks and to make provision with respect to the Countryside Commission; to amend the law relating to public rights of way; and for connected purposes.
- Citation: 1981 c. 69
- Territorial extent: England and Wales; Scotland (in part); Northern Ireland (in part); (Note: Section 74(5)–(6).)

Dates
- Royal assent: 30 October 1981
- Commencement: various (Note: Section 74(2)–(2).)
Other legislation
Amends	Dogs (Protection of Livestock) Act 1953; Conservation of Seals Act 1970; Statute Law (Repeals) Act 1976; Zoo Licensing Act 1981
Repeals/revokes	Protection of Birds Act 1954; Protection of Birds Act 1954 (Amendment) Act 1964; Protection of Birds Act 1967; Conservation of Wild Creatures and Wild Plants Act 1975
Amended by	Road Traffic Regulation Act 1984; Pilotage Act 1987; Statute Law (Repeals) Act 1989; Planning (Consequential Provisions) Act 1990; Deer Act 1991; Protection of Badgers Act 1992; Statute Law (Repeals) Act 1993; Environment Act 1995 (Consequential Amendments) Regulations 1996; Countryside and Rights of Way Act 2000; Commons Act 2006; Infrastructure Act 2015; Planning and Infrastructure Act 2025

Status: Amended

Text of statute as originally enacted

Text of the Wildlife and Countryside Act 1981 as in force today (including any amendments) within the United Kingdom, from legislation.gov.uk.

The Wildlife and Countryside Act 1981 (c. 69) is an act of the Parliament of the United Kingdom implemented to comply with European Council Directive 79/409/EEC on the conservation of wild birds. In short, the act gives protection to native species (especially those at threat), controls the release of non-native species, enhances the protection of Sites of Special Scientific Interest and builds upon the rights of way rules in the National Parks and Access to the Countryside Act 1949. The act is split into four parts covering 74 sections; it also includes 17 schedules.

Few amendments have been made to it, and it has acted as a foundation for later legislation to build upon. The compulsory five year review of schedules 5 and 8 make it dynamic in terms of the species which it protects.

== History ==
=== Wild Birds Protection Act 1902 ===
Wild Birds Protection Act 1902 (Note: Section 2.)
- Act of Parliament
- Parliament of the United Kingdom
- Long title: An Act to amend the Wild Birds Protection Acts.
- Citation: 2 Edw. 7. c. 6
- Territorial extent: United Kingdom

Dates
- Royal assent: 22 July 1902
- Commencement: 22 July 1902 (Note: The Acts of Parliament (Commencement) Act 1793.)
- Repealed: 1 December 1954
Other legislation
Repealed by	Protection of Birds Act 1954

Status: Repealed

Text of statute as originally enacted

The Wild Birds Protection Act 1902 (2 Edw. 7. c. 6) was an act of the Parliament of the United Kingdom, given royal assent on 22 July 1902 and repealed in 1954.

It provided that where any person was convicted of an offence against the Wild Birds Protection Acts 1880 to 1896 (the 1880, 1881, 1894 and 1896 Acts), the court was empowered to dispose of any bird or bird's egg in respect of which the offence had been committed.

The act was repealed and replaced by the Protection of Birds Act 1954. Bird sanctuary orders (BSOs) under this act were replaced by areas of special protection (AoSPs) under the Wildlife and Countryside Act 1981.

=== Birds Directive ===
The 1979 Bern Convention on the Conservation of European Wildlife and Natural Habitats covered the natural heritage of Europe, as well as in some African countries. It encouraged European co-operation in protecting natural habitats; and the conservation of flora and fauna, including migratory species and particularly endangered species.

The convention became open for signature on 19 September 1979 as a binding international legal instrument; it came into force on 1 June 1982. The UK ratified the convention and adopted the European Directive on the Conservation of Wild Birds (among other directives).

European Directive 79/409/EC on the Conservation of Wild Birds was adopted on 2 April 1979. The main provisions included: protection of vulnerable species; classification of Special Protection Areas, protection for all wild birds; and restrictions on killing/selling/keeping wild birds.

From 1981 several acts have passed as UK legislation to comply with the European Directive on the Conservation. The Wildlife and Countryside Act 1981 strengthened protection of SSSIs introduced by the National Parks and Access to the Countryside Act 1949. The pre-dated acts:

- Protection of Birds Act 1954
- Protection of Birds Act 1954 (Amendment) Act 1964
- Protection of Birds Act 1967
- Conservation of Wild Creatures and Wild Plants Act 1975

were repealed by the passing of the Wildlife and Countryside Act 1981.

The Wildlife and Countryside Act 1981 came into force in 1982. In 1985 the UK ratified the Bonn Convention on the Conservation of Migratory Species of Wild Animals (1979). Adopted in Bonn, West Germany in 1979 and coming into force in 1985, the Bonn Convention worked to conserve migratory species and their habitats. Listed in Appendix I are species which are endangered, Appendix II contains species which would benefit from international cooperation.

Appendix 1 migratory species listed in the convention were amended into the Wildlife and Countryside Act 1981.

Further UK legislation to comply with the European Directive on the Conservation include:

- Wildlife (Northern Ireland) Order 1985 (which contains broadly equivalent provisions to the 1981 act in respect of Northern Ireland)
- Nature Conservation and Amenity Lands Order 1985
- Conservation Regulations 1995
- Offshore Marine Conservation Regulations 2007
- Conservation Regulations 2010

== Overview ==
=== Part I: Wildlife ===
Part I includes sections 1 to 27 of the Act. The legislation contained in these sections covers:

- Protection of wild birds, their eggs and nests
- Protection of other animals
- Protection of plants
- Miscellaneous
  - Introduction into the wild of species that are not native to Great Britain or are otherwise banned (Section 14): a list of affected animal and plant species was greatly expanded in the Wildlife and Countryside Act 1981 (Variation of Schedule 9) (England and Wales) Order 2010
  - The import or export of endangered species.

=== Part II: Nature Conservation, Countryside & National Parks ===
Part II includes sections 28 to 52 of the Act. The legislation contained in these sections covers:

- Nature conservation
  - Sites of Special Scientific Interest
  - Limestone pavements
  - National nature reserves
  - Marine nature reserves
- Countryside
- National parks

=== Part III: Public Rights of Way ===
Part III includes sections 53 to 66 of the Act. Building on the National Parks and Access to the Countryside Act 1949 which required local authorities to draw up maps defining public rights of way.

- Ascertainment of public rights of way
  - The duties of government bodies to identify, maintain and update records about Public Rights of Way and to keep maps showing rights of way under continuous review.
- Updating and changing public rights of way
  - Updating may be required after the following:
    1. diversion of a highway
    2. extension of a highway
    3. widening of a highway
    4. stopping of a highway
    5. addition of a highway
    6. removal of a highway
    7. change in position of public path or traffic byway
    8. implementation of restrictions to public right of way
  - Rights of way are maintained at public expense.
  - An up-to-date map act as evidence that the public has right of way in relevant way (i.e. by foot on footpaths or on horseback on bridleways).
  - Changes of right of way requires a survey or review by the local surveying authority
- Miscellaneous & Supplemental
  - Some responsibilities of owners of land crossed by a Public Right of Way
  - Regulation of traffic on Public Rights of Way

=== Part IV: Miscellaneous & General ===
Part IV includes sections 67 to 74 of the Act. The legislation contained in these sections covers:

- Application of the Act to Crown land
- Application of the Act to the Isles of Scilly
- Offences by 'bodies corporate'
- Financial provisions
- Definitions
  - "public path" means a footpath or bridleway.
  - "footpath" allows the public to use highway on foot.
  - "bridleway" allows the public to use highway on foot or bicycle, leading a horse or riding a horse.
  - "byway open to all traffic" allows public to use highway for vehicles, on foot, leading a horse or riding a horse
  - "recognised dairy breed" means Ayrshire, British Friesian, British Holstein, Dairy Shorthorn, Guernsey, Jersey and Kerry.
  - "relevant conservation body" means Natural England or Countryside Council for Wales

=== Schedules ===
The Act contains 17 schedules.

- Schedules 1 to 10 relate to powers under the "Wildlife" part of the Act. Schedule 1 lists over forty species of birds that are protected by special penalties. Schedule 2 lists Huntable birds and their close seasons.
- Schedules 11 to 13 relate to powers under Part II of the Act
- Schedules 14 to 16 relate to powers under Part III of the Act
- Schedule 17 lists previous legislation that was repealed in favour of this Act.

=== Amendments ===
There have been a few simple amendments to the Wildlife and Countryside Act, such as word changes, increase in fines, etc. Every 5 years the JNCC coordinates a compulsory review of schedules 5 and 8 to add new species that may need protection.

A secretary of state can add or remove species at any time.

==== Main amendments to the Wildlife and Countryside Act 1981 ====
- 1985: Makes it necessary for local authorities to use Countryside Commission guidelines in deciding whether area with natural beauty are important to conserve. Amendments were made to SSSI documentation, notification periods and maintenance of registers.
- 1991: Amendment making it an offence to knowingly cause or permit to cause actions listed in sections 5 and 11.
- 1995: Restricts licenses issued to control wild birds in order to reduce damage to crops, livestock, etc.
- 1998: Variation of schedules 5 and 8; for example, Flamingo Moss (Desmatodon cernuus) was added to schedule 8 as well as 17 other species.
- 1999: Variation of schedule 9; several species of deer were added to schedule 9.
- 2004: Minor amendments of various words.

==== Amendments from following legislation ====
- 1990: The Environmental Protection Act 1990 established English Nature and the Joint Nature Conservation Committee. JNCC made responsible for producing guidelines for SSSI selection.
- 1994: Conservation Regulations 1994. Built on Part I protecting habitats and species by implementing the requirement to assess plans/projects that will impact on European Protected Species.
- 2000: The Countryside and Rights of Way Act 2000 strengthened protection of SSSIs; by increased English Nature's enforcement power (allowed to combat neglect, prevent damaging activity, make public bodies responsible for conservation and enhancement of SSSIs) and increasing penalties for damage to a maximum of £20,000 per offence (along with court power to order restoration if damage occurs). Improved public rights of way giving people access to mountain, moor, heath, down and registered common land.
- 2006: The Natural Environment and Rural Communities Act 2006 merged English Nature and the Countryside Agency to create Natural England. Introduced new offences involving the intentional and reckless damage of SSSIs.
- 2009: The Marine and Coastal Access Act 2009 allowed the creation of marine conservation zones and with the consent of the secretary of state, the creation of SSSIs below mean low water mark.
- 2011: The Wildlife and Natural Environment (Scotland) Act 2011 made some major amendments with regard to control of non-native species, the protection of birds, protection of hares and rabbits and associated poaching.

== Regulators ==
=== Regulated by Natural England ===
As well as being a regulator of the Wildlife and Countryside Act 1981, Natural England acts as an advisor (to individuals, companies, government, etc.) in relation to nature conservation. Additionally Natural England helps with land management through grants, projects and information.

Legally responsible for Sites of Special Scientific Interest (SSSIs) and enforce law when necessary. Damage, destruction or disturbance of SSSI habitats and features can lead to the following actions by Natural England:

- information: awareness and education can stop harmful activities
- warning letters: request harmful activity to stop and request agreement for restoration
- formal investigations: collection of evidence by trained investigators following legal evidence requirements
- cautions: if prosecution is not an appropriate action then a caution is issued if necessary evidence has been collected (to have a good chance of conviction)
- prosecution: only occurs when evidence collected makes conviction reasonably certain or where prosecution is in the public interest. Natural England always try to recover costs and publicise prosecutions to the press. Specific penalties are applied, consideration of profit gained from offence is considered and often added to fines, application for a formal restoration order is made making the offender responsible for restoration of SSSI (at offender's expense).
- civil action: in most serious cases where all other options have been explored, Natural England can take civil action to claim possession of SSSIs under serious threat.

=== Regulated by Natural Resources Wales and Scottish Natural Heritage ===
Similar responsibilities to Natural England, but responsible in Wales and Scotland, respectively.

=== Regulated by the police ===
Within the police there are several aspects to regulating wildlife crime; intelligence, enforcement and prevention.

The police are responsible for enforcing part I of the Wildlife and Countryside Act 1981, often advised by Natural England and will investigate wildlife offences; usually performed by wildlife crime officers (WCOs).

The National Wildlife Crime Unit (NWCU) is a law enforcement unit which helps agencies with enforcement. Wildlife crime investigations, statistics and intelligence are provided.

=== Regulated by the Environment Agency ===
The Environment Agency deal with reports from the public in relation to wildlife crime; under duties to prosecute environmental crimes, offences such as damage to habitats and wildlife are included. The EA work closely with the RSPB and wildlife crime officers.

=== Regulated by local authorities ===
Local authorities (e.g. Southampton City Council) are responsible for regulating public rights of way and enforcing rights of way legislation. Issues such as obstructions and misleading signs are usually reported by members of the public and then are dealt with by the local authority.

=== Monitored by ===
- Regulatory bodies (mentioned above).
- NGOs; the RSPB and RSPCA work with the police to prevent and identify wildlife crime.
- General public.
- The Partnership for Action against Wildlife Crime (PAW)- a multi-agency body which encourages both statutory and NGO organisations to work together in the combat of wildlife crime.

== Offences ==
=== Land owners and occupiers ===
- Failing to comply with the restrictions on methods to kill animals and birds (see Part I: Wildlife for further details).
- Killing, injuring a wild bird or animal, damaging or destroying the nest/shelter of a wild bird or animal (see Part I: Wildlife for further details).
- Removing any native plant (see Part I: Wildlife for further details).
- Carrying out, causing or allowing operations likely to damage an SSSI without consent.
- Failing to keep to a management notice.
- Failing to let the national conservation body know about a change in ownership or occupation of land in an SSSI"
- Failing to maintain public rights of way; removing obstructions, surfacing, maintaining safe and easy to use access points.

=== Public bodies/industry ===
- Failing to comply with the restrictions on methods to kill animals and birds (see Part I: Wildlife for further details).
- Killing, injuring a wild bird or animal, damaging or destroying the nest/shelter of a wild bird or animal (see Part I: Wildlife for further details).
- Removing any native plant (see Part I: Wildlife for further details).
- Release of non native species into the environment (see Part I: Wildlife for further details).
- Carrying out or authorising operations likely to damage an SSSI without meeting the requirements to notify Natural England.
- Failing to minimise any damage to an SSSI and if there is any damage, failing to restore it to its former state so far as is reasonably practical and possible."

=== Any person ===
- Failing to comply with the restrictions on methods to kill animals and birds (see Part I: Wildlife for further details).
- Killing, injuring a wild bird or animal, damaging or destroying the nest/shelter of a wild bird or animal (see Part I: Wildlife for further details).
- Removing any native plant (see Part I: Wildlife for further details).
- Intentionally or recklessly damaging, destroying or disturbing any of the habitats or features of an SSSI.
- Intentionally or recklessly damaging, destroying, obscuring or taking down a site notice put up on land within an SSSI.
- Preventing one of our officers lawfully accessing an SSSI."

== Penalties ==
Tried with regards to each separate animal/site involved. If multiple organisms or sites are involved then defendant tried per animal/site involved:

- Up to £5,000 fine (incidents involving SSSIs can now incur fines of up to £20,000 under amendments made by the Countryside and Rights of Way Act 2000).
- Up to six months imprisonment
- If the defendant is a corporation then the head of that corporation may also be tried as liable and face the fine and/or prison sentence.

=== Exemptions ===
==== Exemptions to Part 1: Wildlife ====
There are various exemptions applied to part one providing protection for wildlife, thus no lawful act or offence will be committed, if:

- an authorised person for example by obtaining a licence from Natural England or DEFRA kills or takes a wild bird, damages or destroys the nest of a bird and damages or removes eggs from the nest.
- an authorised person for example has obtained a licence for killing or injuring an animal in schedule 5 and can provide sufficient evidence stating it was necessary to prevent damage and protect livestock, crops, vegetables, fruit, growing timber and fisheries.
- a wild bird or animal has been taken if injured and that person's intention is to tend and return the bird or animal to the wild when fully recovered. If it is so severely injured beyond recovery then it can be killed in the most humane way possible.

All sick and injured birds and animals which are being cared for must be registered with DEFRA.

- it can be shown that the destruction of a nest, egg, bird, animal or an animal's shelter was accidental from a lawful operation and could not have been avoided.
- an individual can provide evidence showing it was necessary to kill or injure a protected animal or bird in order to protect livestock, crops, vegetables, fruit, growing timber and fisheries.

== Variations ==
Provided below is a list - probably incomplete - of documents modifying the W&C Act 1981.

- "The Wildlife and Countryside Act 1981 (Variation of Schedules) Order 1988". Statutory Instrument 1988 No. 288.
- "Wildlife and Countryside Act 1981 (Variation of Schedule 4) Order 1994". Statutory Instrument. 1994.
