= Joint committee (legislative) =

A joint committee is a committee made up of members of the two chambers of a bicameral legislature. In other contexts, it refers to a committee with members from more than one organization.

== Germany ==
A joint committee (Gemeinsamer Ausschuss) comprises both members of Bundestag (two thirds) and representatives of the Länder (one third). It exists to ensure a working legislature during a state of defense.

A mediation committee (Vermittlungsausschuss), consisting in equal numbers of members of Bundestag and representatives of the states, facilitates compromises between Bundestag and Bundesrat in legislation - especially if the consent of Bundesrat is constitutionally required.

== India ==
In India, a Joint Parliamentary Committee (JPC) is one type of ad hoc Parliamentary committee constituted by the Indian parliament. A Joint Parliamentary Committee is formed when a motion is adopted by one house and it is supported or agreed by the other house.

== Philippines ==
A bicameral conference committee is formed for each bill where the Senate and the House of Representatives have conflicting versions. The committee has the same number of members from each chamber. Once passed, the chambers then have to approve the version passed by the bicameral conference committee in order for it to be sent for the president's signature.

If Congress is short on time, a chamber may approve the other chamber's version instead.

== Republic of Ireland ==
A Joint Committee of the Irish Oireachtas (parliament) comprises members of both Dáil Éireann (the lower house) and Seanad Éireann (the upper house).

== United Kingdom ==
A Joint committee of the Parliament of the United Kingdom is a parliamentary committee consisting of members of both the House of Commons and the House of Lords. Joint Committees can be permanent or temporary. Three permanent committees meet on a regular basis to consider Human Rights, National Security Strategy and Statutory Instruments. A Joint Committee on Consolidation Bills, which was first appointed in 1894, considers all bills that seek to consolidate existing statutes. In a similar way, a Joint Committee on Tax Law Rewrite Bills scrutinizes all bills that seek to simplify tax laws. Temporary committees have considered specific topics ranging from draft bills on financial services and climate change to restoration of the Palace of Westminster. There are two statutory committees that have members from both Houses, the Ecclesiastical Committee and the Intelligence and Security Committee.

== United States ==
A Joint Committee of the United States Congress is a congressional committee consisting of both Senate and House members and having jurisdiction over matters of joint interest. An example of a joint committee is the Joint Committee on the Library. Most joint committees are permanent (as with the Library Committee) but temporary joint committees have been created to address specific issues (such as the Joint Committee on the Conduct of the War during the American Civil War).

Joint committees are also a feature for upper and lower houses of State legislatures in some States.

== See also ==
- Joint session
- Joint Working Group
