= Joint Committee on the Draft Parliamentary Buildings Bill =

Committee of the House of Commons

The Joint Committee on the Draft Parliamentary Buildings Bill is a joint select committee of the House of Commons and House of Lords in the Parliament of the United Kingdom. The committee was established in 2018 with a remit to consider the Draft Parliamentary Buildings Bill.

They were due to report on 28 March 2019.

== Membership ==
As of 17 March 2019, the members of the committee are as follows:

| Member | Party | Constituency |
|---|---|---|
| Rt. Hon. Dame Caroline Spelman PC DBE MP (Chair) | Conservative | Meriden |
| Rt. Hon. Baron Blunkett PC | Labour | N/A |
| Rt. Hon. Baron Brabazon of Tara PC DL | Conservative | N/A |
| Baroness Byford DBE DL | Conservative | N/A |
| Neil Gray MP | SNP | Airdrie and Shotts |
| Meg Hillier MP | Labour | Hackney South and Shoreditch |
| Rt. Hon. David Jones MP | Conservative | Clwyd West |
| Rt. Hon. Sir Edward Leigh MP | Conservative | Gainsborough |
| Rt. Hon. Baroness Prashar CBE PC | Crossbench | N/A |
| Rt. Hon. Baron Stunell OBE PC | Liberal Democrats | N/A |
| Rt. Hon. Mark Tami PC MP | Labour | Alyn and Deeside |
| Baroness Warwick of Undercliffe | Labour | N/A |

== See also ==
- Joint committee of the Parliament of the United Kingdom
- Parliamentary committees of the United Kingdom
