= Joint committee of the Parliament of the United Kingdom =

Parliamentary committee of UK parliament

A joint committee of the Parliament of the United Kingdom is a legislative joint committee formed to examine a particular issue, whose members are drawn from both the House of Commons and House of Lords of the Parliament of the United Kingdom. It is a type of Parliamentary committee of the United Kingdom.

== Permanent joint select committees ==
Three permanent joint select committees meet regularly:

- Joint Committee on the National Security Strategy
- Joint Committee on Human Rights
- Joint Committee on Statutory Instruments

Two committees meet as required to scrutinize bills that seek to consolidate existing statutes or to simplify the language of tax laws:

- Joint Committee on Consolidation Bills
- Joint Committee on Tax Law Rewrite Bills

== Temporary joint select committees ==
Temporary Joint Select committees are formed to consider either a specific topic or a proposed law (Bill) that requires particular scrutiny.

Former committees have considered the following specific topics:

- Parliamentary Privilege (July 1997 to April 1999)
- House of Lords Reform (July 2002 to May 2003)
- Conventions on the relationship between the two Houses of Parliament (May to November 2006)
- Privacy and Injunctions (July 2011 to March 2012)
- Banking Standards (July 2012 to July 2013)
- Parliamentary Privilege (December 2012 to June 2013)
- Palace of Westminster (July 2015 to September 2016)

== Other joint committees ==
There are two statutory committees whose membership is formed from both the Commons and the Lords:

- Ecclesiastical Committee
- Intelligence and Security Committee of Parliament

In addition, a joint committee advises on the security of the Parliamentary Estate:

- Joint Committee on Security

== See also ==
- Joint committee (legislative)
- List of joint committees (UK local government)
- Parliament of the United Kingdom
