= List of joint committees (UK local government) =

The appointment of committees and joint committees under section 102 of the Local Government Act 1972 is a legal provision for councils in England.

- Adur and Worthing Joint Committee
- Anglia Revenues and Benefits Partnership Joint Committee
- Bramcote Crematorium Joint Committee
- Central Durham Crematorium Joint Committee
- Chilterns Crematorium Joint Committee
- Chorley and South Ribble Shared Services Joint Committee
- CNC Building Control Partnership Joint Committee
- Cleveland Emergency Planning Joint Committee
- Colchester and Ipswich Museum Service Joint Committee
- Devon Building Control Partnership Joint Committee
- Eastern Sea Fisheries Joint Committee
- Eltham Crematorium Joint Committee
- Humber Emergency Planning Service
- Lincs Building Consultancy Joint Committee
- National Parking Adjudication Service Joint Committee
- Portchester Crematorium Joint Committee
- Public Protection Partnership Joint Committee
- Sheffield and Rotherham Emergency Planning Service
- Shropshire Waste Partnership Joint Committee
- Somerset Waste Partnership Joint Committee
- South Downs Joint Committee
- South Worcestershire Shared Services Partnership Joint Committee
- Staffordshire Connects Joint Committee
- Tamar Bridge and Torpoint Ferry Joint Committee
- Tayside Contracts Joint Committee
- Three Rivers and Watford Shared Services Joint Committee
- West Yorkshire Joint Services Committee

== See also ==
- Joint committee of the Parliament of the United Kingdom
