= Vote Bundle =

The Vote Bundle is the collection of paperwork given daily to each Member of the British House of Commons when the House is sitting. These are considered the practical daily working papers of the house. This bundle usually includes:

- Summary agenda
- Order of business
- Standing committee notices
- Future business
- Order of business in Westminster Hall
- 'The vote' (record of proceedings)
- Notices of questions
- Private business
- Notice of motions
- Notice of amendments
- Other documents
