= Ecclesiastical Committee =

Committee of the UK Parliament

The Ecclesiastical Committee is a statutory joint committee of the Parliament of the United Kingdom, created by the Church of England Assembly (Powers) Act 1919 to review Church of England measures submitted to Parliament by the Legislative Committee of the General Synod.

It comprises 30 members of the Parliament of the United Kingdom. The Lord Speaker appoints 15 members from the House of Lords, and the Speaker of the House of Commons appoints 15 MPs to serve on the committee. Members are appointed to serve for the duration of a parliament.

== Chairs ==
Committee chairs include those listed below.

| Name | Start | End | Party | Constituency |
|---|---|---|---|---|
| Tony Lloyd, Baron Lloyd of Berwick | 24 January 2002 | 27 March 2015 | Crossbench | Life peer |
| Elizabeth Butler-Sloss, Baroness Butler-Sloss | 9 July 2015 | present | Crossbench | Life peer |

== Membership ==
As of May 2026, the members of the committee are as follows:

| House of Commons | | | House of Lords | |
| MP | Party | Constituency | Peer | Party |
|---|---|---|---|---|
| Juliet Campbell | Labour | Broxtowe | Baroness Butler-Sloss(Chair) | Crossbench |
| Tom Collins | Labour | Worcester | Lord Dannatt | Crossbench |
| Jonathan Davies | Labour | Mid Derbyshire | Baroness Eaton | Conservative |
| Marsha de Cordova | Labour | Battersea | Lord Faulkner of Worcester | Labour |
| Zöe Franklin | Liberal Democrat | Guildford | Lord Griffiths of Burry Port | Labour |
| Danny Kruger | Reform | East Wiltshire | Baroness Harris of Richmond | Liberal Democrat |
| Luke Myer | Labour | Middlesbrough South and East Cleveland | Lord Jones | Labour |
| Al Pinkerton | Liberal Democrat | Surrey Heath | Lord Lisvane | Crossbench |
| Cat Smith | Labour Co-op | Lancaster and Wyre | Baroness McIntosh of Hudnall | Labour |
| David Smith | Labour | North Northumberland | Lord Shinkwin | Conservative |
| Rebecca Smith | Conservative | South West Devon | Baroness Symons of Vernham Dean | Labour |
| Sarah Smith | Labour | Hyndburn | Lord Taylor of Holbeach | Conservative |
| Martin Vickers | Conservative | Brigg and Immingham | | |
| Melanie Ward | Labour | Cowdenbeath and Kirkcaldy | | |

== See also ==
- Joint committee of the Parliament of the United Kingdom
- Parliamentary committees of the United Kingdom
