= Joint Committee on the Palace of Westminster =

The Joint Committee on the Palace of Westminster was a joint select committee appointed to assess the options contained within an independent assessment report on a proposed major restoration and renewal of the Palace of Westminster and "make recommendations on a preferred way forward".

== Chairs ==
Committee chairs include those listed below.

Name	Start	End	Party	Constituency
Chris Grayling	16 July 2015	3 May 2017	Conservative	Epsom and Ewell
The Baroness Stowell of Beeston	16 July 2015	3 May 2017	Conservative	Life peer

== Members ==
The Joint Committee was appointed by the House of Commons on 16 July 2015 and by the House of Lords on 20 July 2015. The committee had twelve members (six from each House).

1. Chris Bryant — Labour MP
2. Patrick Carter — Labour peer
3. Paul Deighton — Conservative peer
4. Neil Gray — Scottish National Party
5. Chris Grayling — Conservative MP & co-chair
6. Herbert Laming — Crossbencher
7. Ian Paisley Jr — Democratic Unionist Party MP
8. Jacob Rees-Mogg — Conservative MP
9. Angela Smith of Basildon — Labour peer
10. Tina Stowell — Conservative peer & co-chair
11. Mark Tami — Labour MP
12. Jim Wallace — Liberal Democrat peer

In July 2016 Construction News reported: A crucial report on the Palace of Westminster's multi-billion-pound restoration project has been delayed to an unspecified date, The Grade-I listed building, which forms part of a Unesco world heritage site, needs urgent repairs and building work to safeguard it from fire, water damage, security threats and dilapidation. But a parliamentary committee report recommending a way forward – expected in “early 2016” – has been delayed until at least the autumn and there is no date scheduled for its publication. A spokesperson from the joint committee on the Palace of Westminster confirmed that it would not be published before the summer recess, which started on Thursday [21 June]. She said she was unaware of rumors that prime minister Theresa May had ordered the report to be shelved altogether.

In September 2016, SNP member Neil Gray proposed "the Joint Committee declines to consider a draft Report until it has given full consideration to the possibility of constructing a permanent new Parliamentary building, while finding an alternative future use for the Palace of Westminster; notes that this option was included in the Pre-Feasibility Study and Preliminary Strategic Business Case published in October 2012 but was rejected by the House of Commons Commission and the House of Lords House Committee at that stage; and resolves to apply the same rigorous scrutiny to the possible construction of a new Parliamentary building as it has applied to the other options for delivering the Restoration and Renewal Programme, before making a recommendation about the best option for carrying out the works" the committee voted 11/1 against this proposal.

In November 2016 Chris Byrant committee member and spokesperson for the restoration of the palace, said he would like the restoration of the Palace of Westminster and programme of works in parliament's Northern Estate combined into one overarching programme of works on the parliamentary estate because the works in the Northern Estate need to be completed before the works on the palace can begin. The timetable for the works to the palace is already slipping with Bryant saying a 2022–23 start date - nearly two years later than a report from Deloitte, Aecom and HOK last year recommended.

September 2017 Following the Dissolution of Parliament on 3 May 2017, this select committee has ceased to exist and has yet to be reformed, however the contact webpage page for this committee states that the committee is no longer meeting and gives a contact address and email for "Inquiries about Restoration and Renewal"

November 2018 The House of Commons and House of Lords jointly appoint members to a committee to scrutinise the Draft Parliamentary Buildings (Restoration and Renewal) Bill. To be known as the Joint Committee on the Draft Parliamentary Buildings Bill.

== See also ==
- Proposed relocation of the Parliament of the United Kingdom
- Parliament of the United Kingdom
- Joint Committee on the Palace of Westminster
