= Joint Committee on Consolidation Bills =

Joint committee of the Parliament of the United Kingdom

The Joint Committee on Consolidation Bills (commonly known as Consolidation Bills Committee) is a joint committee of the Parliament of the United Kingdom. The Committee was first established in 1894 with a remit to consider consolidation bills. The Committee, which also considers Statute Law Revision Bills and bills prepared by the Law Commission or Scottish Law Commission to repeal outdated laws, is made up of 12 members of each House. Bills considered by the Committee originate in the Lords and are referred to it after second reading. After the Committee reports, the remaining stages in both Houses proceed formally (i.e., without debate).

== Chairs ==
Committee chairs include those listed below.

Name	Start	End	Party	Constituency
Robert Carswell, Baron Carswell	12 July 2010	30 March 2015	Crossbench	Life peer
Tony Clarke, Baron Clarke of Stone-cum-Ebony	1 July 2019	13 February 2020	Crossbench	Life peer
John Thomas, Baron Thomas of Cwmgiedd	5 September 2024	present	Crossbench	Life peer

== Membership ==
As of May 2022, the members of the committee are as follows:

House of Commons			House of Lords	
MP	Party	Constituency	Peer	Party
Duncan Baker	Conservative	North Norfolk	Lord Thomas of Cwmgiedd (Chair)	Crossbench
Simon Baynes	Conservative	Clwyd South	Baroness Andrews	Labour
Richard Burgon	Labour	Leeds East	Baroness D'Souza	Crossbench
Elliot Colburn	Conservative	Carshalton and Wallington	Lord Eames	Crossbench
Maria Eagle	Labour	Garston and Halewood	Baroness Mallalieu	Labour
Simon Jupp	Conservative	East Devon	Lord Razzall	Liberal Democrat
Christina Rees	Labour	Neath	Lord Rowlands	Labour
Andy Slaughter	Labour	Hammersmith	Baroness Seccombe	Conservative
Jane Stevenson	Conservative	Wolverhampton North East	Baroness Thomas of Winchester	Liberal Democrat
Julian Sturdy	Conservative	York Outer		
Owen Thompson	Scottish National	Midlothian		
Suzanne Webb	Conservative	Stourbridge		

== See also ==
- Joint committee of the Parliament of the United Kingdom
- Parliamentary committees of the United Kingdom
