= Joint Committee on Tax Law Rewrite Bills =

The Joint Committee on Tax Law Rewrite Bills was a joint committee of the Parliament of the United Kingdom. The remit of the committee was to scrutinise bills intended to make the language of tax law simpler, while preserving the effect of the existing law, subject to minor changes. It scrutinized the Tax Law Rewrite Project.

== History ==
The Joint Committee on Tax Simplification sat between January 2001 to May 2002. It was replaced by the Joint Committee on Tax Law Rewrite Bills in May 2002, which scrutinised the Tax Law Rewrite Project until April 2010.

The committee has not been active since then.

== Chairs ==
Committee chairs include those listed below.

Name	Start	End	Party	Constituency
Kenneth Clarke	14 January 2003	9 November 2009	Conservative	Rushcliffe
Andrew Tyrie	11 January 2010	6 May 2010	Conservative	Chichester

== Membership ==
As of May 2026, the membership of the committee has not been selected for the current Parliament.

== See also ==
- Joint committee of the Parliament of the United Kingdom
- Parliamentary committees of the United Kingdom
