= House of Commons of the United Kingdom =

Lower house of the UK Parliament

Coordinates: 51°29′59.6″N 0°07′28.8″W

House of Commons
- 59th Parliament of the United Kingdom
- Logo of the House of Commons

- Flag of the House of Commons

Type
- Type: Lower house of the Parliament of the United Kingdom

Leadership
- Speaker: Sir Lindsay Hoyle since 4 November 2019
- Chairman of Ways and Means: Nus Ghani, Conservative since 23 July 2024
- Prime Minister: Andy Burnham, Labour since 20 July 2026
- Leader of the House: Sir Alan Campbell, Labour since 5 September 2025
- Government Chief Whip: Anneliese Midgley, Labour since 20 July 2026
- Leader of the Opposition: Kemi Badenoch, Conservative since 2 November 2024
- Shadow Leader of the House: Jesse Norman, Conservative since 5 November 2024
- Opposition Chief Whip: Dame Rebecca Harris, Conservative since 3 November 2024

Structure
- Seats: 650
- Political groups: HM Government: Labour Party (404) (Note: Including 43 MPs sponsored by the Co-operative Party, who are designated Labour and Co-operative); HM Official Opposition: Conservative Party (118); Other opposition: Liberal Democrats (71); Reform UK (8); Scottish National Party (8); Democratic Unionist Party (5); Green Party of England and Wales (5); Independent Alliance (4) (Note: Some sources group Independent Alliance MPs with other independent MPs, instead of treating the Independent Alliance as a separate group.); Plaid Cymru (4); Social Democratic and Labour Party (2) (Note: The SDLP is a sister party of the Labour Party, operating solely in Northern Ireland. The SDLP MPs sit on the government benches (with Labour), but do not take the Labour whip.); Your Party (2) (Note: Your Party has two declared MPs. Two MPs who sit for the Independent Alliance are also members of Your Party.); Alliance Party (1); Restore Britain (1); Traditional Unionist Voice (1); Ulster Unionist Party (1); Independents (7) (Note: MPs designated as independents may be elected as independents, leave the party for which they were elected, or be suspended from their party's whip. In the 2024 general election, six MPs were elected as independents, four of whom are currently members of the Independent Alliance and one of Your Party.); Presiding officer: Speaker (1); Abstentionists: Sinn Féin (7)
- Length of term: Up to five years (Note: Current law passed by Parliament limits the term of the House of Commons to five years. However, since Parliament is sovereign, Parliament can extend its term for as long as it pleases. The last time this occurred was during World War II when Parliament voted to extend the term of the House of Commons multiple times until the conclusion of the war, with that Parliament existing for ten years instead of five years.)

Elections
- Voting system: First-past-the-post with single member constituencies
- Last election: 4 July 2024
- Next election: On or before 15 August 2029
- Redistricting: Every eight years, proposed by the boundary commissions

Meeting place
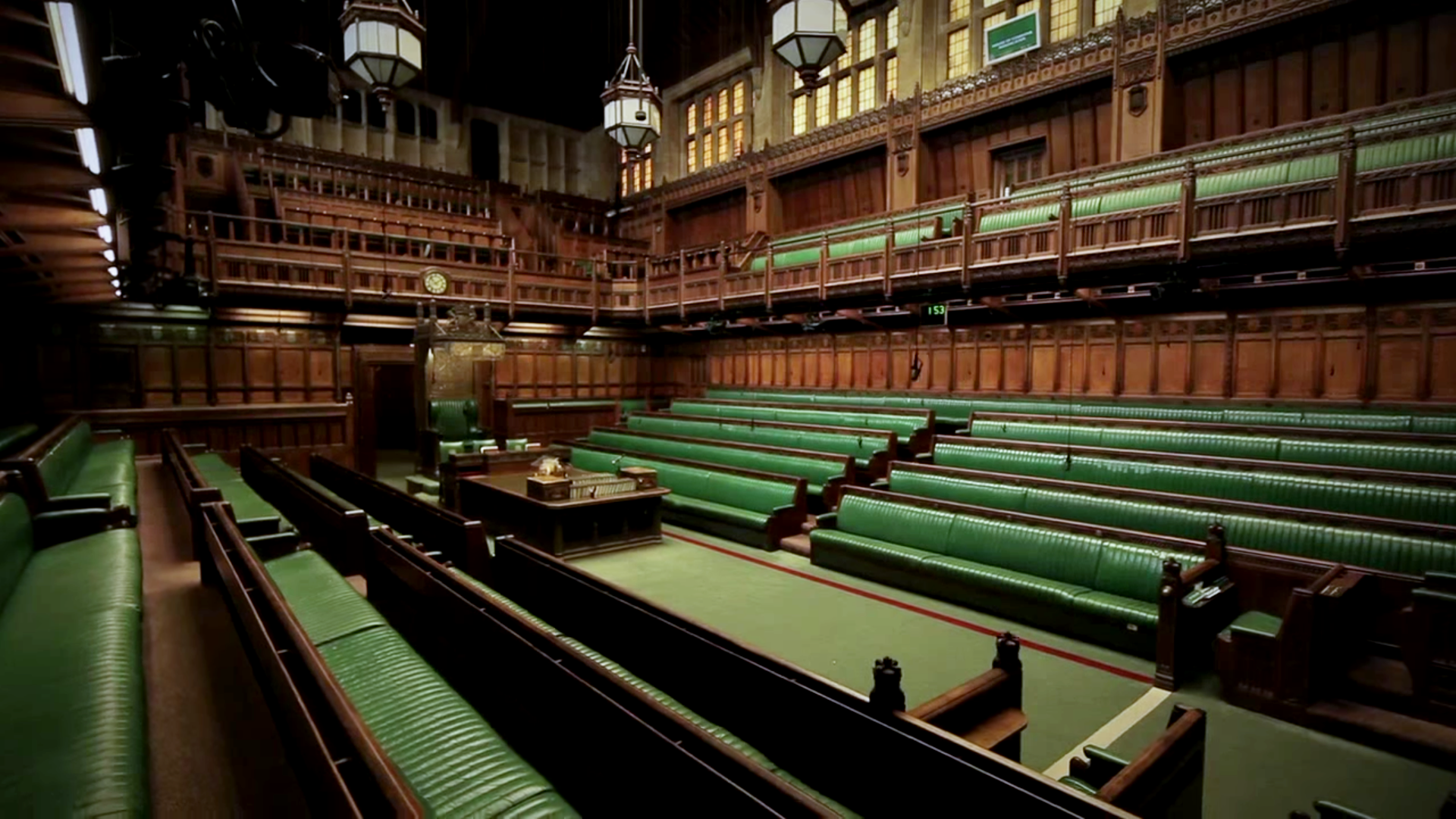
- House of Commons chamber Palace of Westminster; City of Westminster; London, England; United Kingdom

Website
- www.parliament.uk/business/commons/

The House of Commons (Note: Formally The Honourable the Commons of the United Kingdom of Great Britain and Northern Ireland in Parliament assembled.) is the lower house of the Parliament of the United Kingdom. Like the upper house, the House of Lords, it meets in the Palace of Westminster in London, England. The House of Commons is an elected body consisting of 650 members known as members of Parliament (MPs), who are elected to represent constituencies by the first-past-the-post system and hold their seats until Parliament is dissolved.

The House of Commons of England began to evolve in the 13th and 14th centuries. In 1707 it became the House of Commons of Great Britain after the political union with Scotland, and from 1801 it also became the House of Commons for Ireland after the political union of Great Britain and Ireland. In 1922, the body became the House of Commons of the United Kingdom of Great Britain and Northern Ireland after the independence of the Irish Free State. Under the Parliament Acts 1911 and 1949, the Lords' power to reject legislation was reduced to a delaying power. The government is solely responsible to the House of Commons and the prime minister stays in office only as long as they retain the confidence of a majority of the Commons.

== Roles ==
=== Relationship with the government ===
Although the House of Commons does not formally elect the prime minister, by convention and in practice, the prime minister is answerable to the House, and therefore must maintain its support. In this way, the position of the parties in the House is an overriding importance. Thus, whenever the office of prime minister falls vacant, the monarch appoints the person who has the support of the house, or who is most likely to command the support of the house—normally the leader of the largest party in the house—while the leader of the second-largest party becomes the leader of the Opposition.

The Commons may indicate its lack of support for the government by rejecting a motion of confidence or by passing a motion of no confidence. Confidence and no confidence motions are phrased explicitly: for instance, "That this House has no confidence in His Majesty's Government." Many other motions were until recent decades considered confidence issues, even though not explicitly phrased as such: in particular, important bills that were part of the government's agenda. The annual Budget is still considered a matter of confidence. When a government has lost the confidence of the House of Commons, the prime minister is expected either to resign, making way for another MP who can command confidence, or request the monarch to dissolve Parliament, thereby precipitating a general election.

Since the Dissolution and Calling of Parliament Act 2022 Parliament sits for up to five years. Prime ministers can, however, choose to dissolve parliament at earlier times, with the permission of the monarch, and often have. This was a return to the historic system that had been replaced by the Fixed-term Parliaments Act 2011, which fixed the term at five years. As of 9 July 2024, five of the twelve last prime ministers have attained office as the immediate result of a general election; the others have gained office upon the resignation of a prime minister of their own party. (Note: Those others were Jim Callaghan (lost the next election), John Major (won the next election), Gordon Brown (lost the next election), Theresa May (won the next election), Boris Johnson (won the next election), Liz Truss, and Rishi Sunak; they succeeded, respectively, Harold Wilson, Margaret Thatcher, Tony Blair, David Cameron, Theresa May, Boris Johnson, and Liz Truss.)

A prime minister will resign after party defeat at an election, if unable to form a coalition, or obtain a confidence and supply arrangement, and may be forced to resign after a successful motion of no confidence (either from the House as a whole, or from their own parliamentary party). In such cases, the premiership goes to whomever can command a majority in the House, unless there is a hung parliament and a coalition is formed; the new prime minister will by convention be the new leader of the outgoing premier's party. It has become the practice to write the constitutions of major UK political parties to provide a set way to appoint a new party leader.

=== Peers as ministers ===
By convention, ministers are members of either the House of Commons or the House of Lords. A handful have been appointed from outside Parliament, but in most cases they then entered Parliament in a by-election or by receiving a peerage (being made a peer). Since 1902, all but one prime ministers have been members of the Commons at time of appointment; the sole exception was during the long summer recess in 1963: Alec Douglas-Home, then the 14th Earl of Home, disclaimed his peerage (under a new mechanism which remains in force) three days after becoming prime minister. The new session of Parliament was delayed to await the outcome of his by-election, which happened to be already under way due to a recent death. As anticipated, he won that election, which was for the highest-majority seat in Scotland among his party; otherwise he would have been constitutionally obliged to resign.

Since 1990, almost all cabinet ministers, save for three whose offices are an intrinsic part of the House of Lords, have belonged to the Commons.

Few major cabinet positions (except Lord Privy Seal, Lord Chancellor and Leader of the House of Lords) have been filled by a peer in recent times. Notable exceptions are Sir Alec Douglas-Home, who served as Foreign Secretary from 1960 to 1963; Peter Carington, 6th Lord Carrington, who also served as Foreign Secretary, from 1979 to 1982; David Cameron, former Prime Minister who served as Foreign Secretary from 2023 to 2024; David Young, Lord Young of Graffham, who was Employment Secretary from 1985 to 1987; Peter Mandelson, who served as Business Secretary from 2008 to 2010; Lord Adonis, who served as Transport Secretary from 2009 to 2010; Baroness Amos, who served as International Development Secretary in 2003; and Baroness Morgan of Cotes, who served as Culture Secretary from 2019 to 2020. The elected status of members of the Commons (as opposed to the unelected Lords) and their direct accountability to that House, together with empowerment and transparency, ensures ministerial accountability. Responsible government is an international constitutional paradigm. The prime minister chooses the ministers, and may decide to remove them at any time, although the appointments and dismissals are formally made by the Sovereign, acting on the prime minister's advice.

=== Scrutiny of the government ===
The House of Commons formally scrutinises the Government through its Committees and Prime Minister's Questions, when members ask questions of the prime minister; the house gives other opportunities to question other cabinet ministers. Prime Minister's Questions occur weekly, normally for half an hour each Wednesday. Questions must relate to the responding minister's official government activities, not to their activities as a party leader or as a private Member of Parliament. Customarily, members of the Government party/coalition and members of the Opposition alternate when asking questions. Members may also make inquiries in writing.

In practice, this scrutiny can be fairly weak. Since the first-past-the-post electoral system is employed, the governing party often enjoys a large majority in the Commons, and ministers and departments practise defensive government, outsourcing key work to third parties. If the government has a large majority, it has no need or incentive to compromise with other parties.

Major modern British political parties tend to be so tightly orchestrated that their MPs often have little scope for free action. A large minority of ruling party MPs are paid members of the Government. Since 1900 the Government has lost confidence motions thrice—twice in 1924, and once in 1979. However, the threat of rebellions by their own party's backbench MPs often forces governments to make concessions (e.g. under the Cameron–Clegg coalition, over foundation hospitals and under Labour over top-up fees and compensation for failed company pension schemes). Occasionally Government bills are defeated by backbench rebellions (Terrorism Act 2006). However, the scrutiny provided by the Select committees is more serious.

The House of Commons technically retains the power to impeach Ministers of the Crown (or any other subject, even if not a public officer) for their crimes. Impeachments are tried by the House of Lords, where a simple majority is necessary to convict. This power has fallen into disuse, however; the House of Commons exercises its checks on the government through other means, such as no confidence motions; the last impeachment was that of Henry Dundas, 1st Viscount Melville in 1806.

=== Legislative functions ===
Bills may be introduced in either house, though bills of importance generally originate in the House of Commons. The supremacy of the Commons in legislative matters is assured by the Parliament Acts 1911 and 1949, under which certain types of bills may be presented to the sovereign for royal assent without the consent of the House of Lords. The Lords may not delay a money bill (a bill that, in the view of the Speaker of the House of Commons, solely concerns national taxation or public funds) for more than one month. Moreover, the Lords may not delay most other public bills for more than two parliamentary sessions, or one calendar year. These provisions, however, only apply to public bills that originate in the House of Commons. A bill that seeks to extend a parliamentary term beyond five years also requires the consent of the House of Lords.

By a custom that prevailed even before the Parliament Acts, only the House of Commons may originate bills concerning taxation or supply. Furthermore, supply bills passed by the House of Commons are immune to amendments in the House of Lords. In addition, the House of Lords is barred from amending a bill so as to insert a taxation or supply-related provision, but the House of Commons often waives its privileges and allows the Lords to make amendments with financial implications. Under a separate convention, known as the Salisbury Convention, the House of Lords does not seek to oppose legislation promised in the government's election manifesto. Hence, as the power of the House of Lords has been severely curtailed by statute and by practice, the House of Commons is clearly the more powerful chamber of Parliament.

== History ==
The British parliament of today largely descends, in practice, from the Parliament of England, although the 1706 Treaty of Union, and the Acts of Union that ratified the Treaty, created a new Parliament of Great Britain to replace the Parliament of England and the Parliament of Scotland, with the addition of 45 MPs and sixteen Scottish representative peers. Later still the Acts of Union 1800 brought about the abolition of the Parliament of Ireland and enlarged the Commons at Westminster with 100 Irish members, creating the Parliament of the United Kingdom of Great Britain and Ireland.

The Middle English word common or commune, which is derived from the Anglo-Norman commune, meant "of general, public, or non-private nature" as an adjective and, as a substantive, "the common body of the people of any place; the community or commonalty" in the singular; "the common people, the commonalty; the lower order, as distinguished from those of noble or knight or gentle rank", or "the burgers of a town; the body of free citizens, bearing common burdens, and exercising common rights; (hence) the third estate in the English constitution; the body of people, not ennobled, and represented by the Lower House of Parliament" in the plural. The word has survived to this day in the original Anglo-Norman phrase soit baillé aux communes, with which a bill is transmitted from the House of Lords to the House of Commons.

The historian Albert Pollard held a somewhat different view on the word's origins in 1920. He agreed that commons could be derived from Anglo-Norman communes, but that it referred to "civil associations" or "the counties". However, the Oxford English Dictionary, the historical dictionary of the English language, can only attest to the word meaning advocated by Pollard from the 19th and 20th centuries onwards, whereas sources for the meaning given in the previous section date from the late Middle Ages, i.e. the time of the establishment of the House of Commons.

=== Layout and design ===
The current Commons' layout is influenced by the use of the original St. Stephen's Chapel in the Palace of Westminster.

The rectangular shape is derived from the shape of the chapel. Benches were arranged using the configuration of the chapel's choir stalls whereby they were facing across from one another. This arrangement facilitated an adversarial atmosphere representative of the British parliamentary approach.

The distance across the floor of the house between the government and opposition benches is 13 feet (3.96 m), said to be equivalent to two swords' length, though this is likely to be purely symbolic given weapons have been banned in the chamber for hundreds of years.

=== 19th century ===
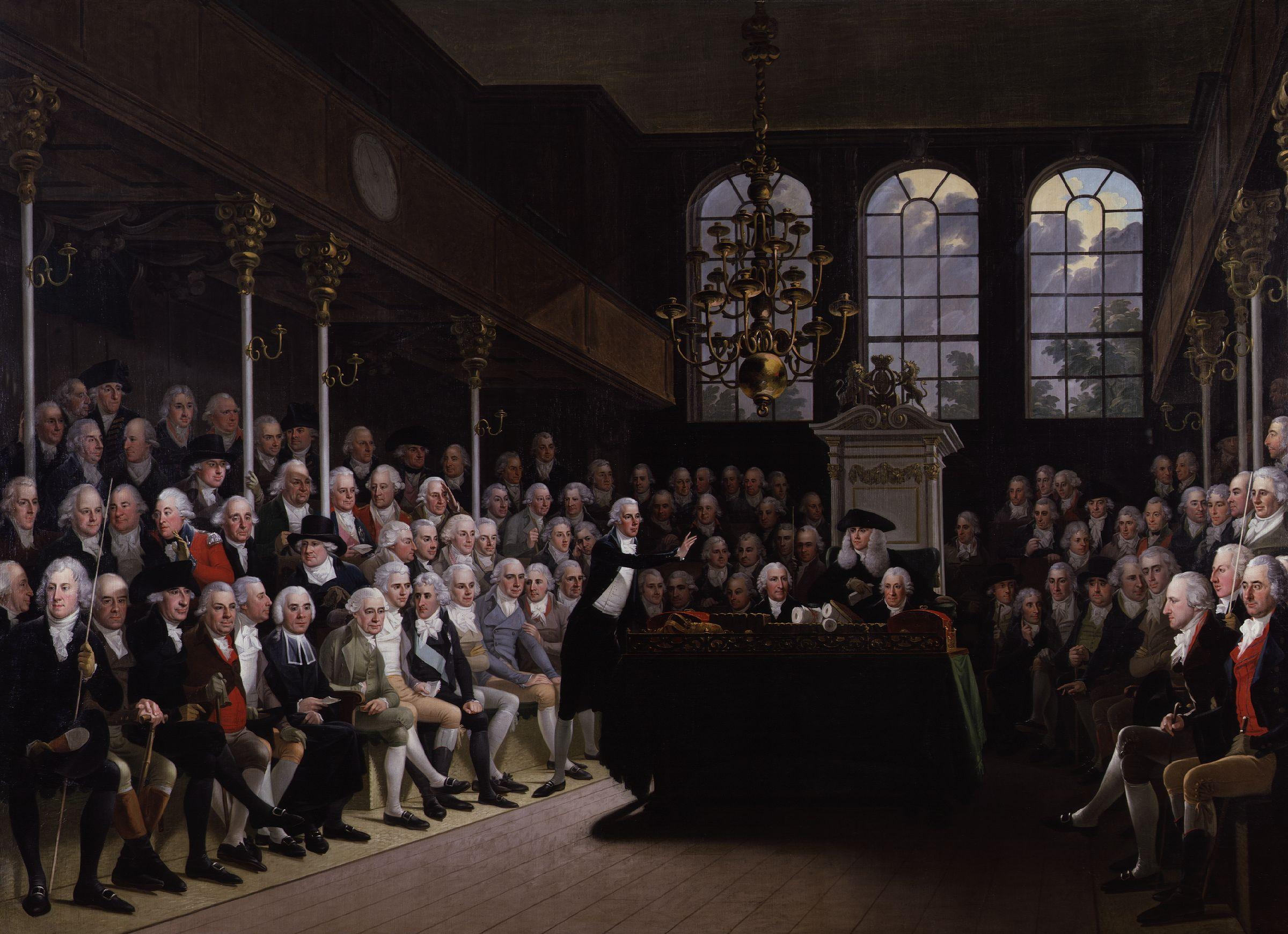
William Pitt the Younger addressing the Commons in The House of Commons, 1793–94 by Anton Hickel

The House of Commons in the early 19th century by Augustus Pugin and Thomas Rowlandson

The House of Commons underwent an important period of reform during the 19th century. Over the years, several anomalies had developed in borough representation. The constituency boundaries had not been changed since 1660, so many towns whose importance had declined by the 19th century still retained their ancient right of electing two members, in addition to other boroughs that had never been important, such as Gatton.

Among the most notorious of these "rotten boroughs" were Old Sarum, which had only six voters for two MPs, and Dunwich, which had largely collapsed into the sea from coastal erosion. At the same time, large cities such as Manchester received no separate representation (although their eligible residents were entitled to vote in the corresponding county seat). Also notable were the pocket boroughs, small constituencies controlled by wealthy landowners and aristocrats, whose "nominees" were invariably elected.

The Commons attempted to address these anomalies by passing a Reform Bill in 1831. At first, the House of Lords proved unwilling to pass the bill, but it was forced to relent when the prime minister, Charles, 2nd Earl Grey, advised King William IV to flood the House of Lords by creating pro-Reform peers. To avoid this, the Lords relented and passed the bill in 1832. The Reform Act 1832, also known as the "Great Reform Act", abolished the rotten boroughs, established uniform voting requirements for the boroughs, and granted representation to populous cities, but still retained some anomalies.

Following a fire that destroyed large parts of the House of Commons in 1834, the rebuild saw the creation of a women's viewing gallery, notably named the "Ladies' Gallery", allowing women to view Parliamentary proceedings. The gallery was "closed off by brass grilles", placed there to limit the MPs views of the women seated there. The gallery was said to have been "hot" and "stuffy", being colloquially referred to as "The Cage". Women such as Anna Catherine Parnell, were frequent visitors of the gallery, with Anna publishing articles about the debates in the Celtic Monthly titled Notes from the Ladies' Cage.

In the ensuing years, the Commons grew more assertive, the influence of the House of Lords having been reduced by the Reform Bill crisis, and the power of the patrons reduced. The Lords became more reluctant to reject bills that the Commons had passed with large majorities, and it became an accepted political principle that the confidence of the House of Commons alone was necessary for a government to remain in office.

Many more reforms were introduced in the latter half of the 19th century. The Reform Act 1867 lowered property requirements for voting in the boroughs, reduced the representation of the less populous boroughs, and granted parliamentary seats to several growing industrial towns. The electorate was further expanded by the Representation of the People Act 1884, under which property qualifications in the counties were lowered. The Redistribution of Seats Act of the following year replaced almost all multi-member constituencies with single-member constituencies.

=== 20th century ===
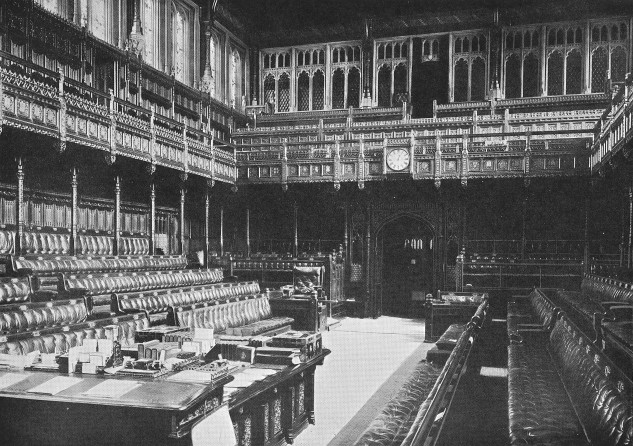
The old Chamber of the House of Commons built by Sir Charles Barry was destroyed by German bombs during the Second World War. The essential features of Barry's design were preserved when the chamber was rebuilt.

In 1908, the Liberal Government under H. H. Asquith introduced a number of social welfare programmes, which, together with an expensive arms race, forced the Government to seek higher taxes. In 1909, the Chancellor of the Exchequer, David Lloyd George, introduced the "People's Budget", which proposed a new tax targeting wealthy landowners. This measure failed in the heavily Conservative House of Lords, and the government resigned.

The resulting general election returned a hung parliament, but Asquith remained prime minister with the support of the smaller parties. Asquith then proposed that the powers of the Lords be severely curtailed. Following a further election in December 1910, the Asquith Government secured the passage of a bill to curtail the powers of the House of Lords after threatening to flood the house with 500 new Liberal peers to ensure the passage of the bill.

Symbol, c. 1945

Thus the Parliament Act 1911 came into effect, destroying the legislative equality of the two Houses of Parliament. The House of Lords was permitted only to delay most legislation, for a maximum of three parliamentary sessions or two calendar years (reduced to two sessions or one year by the Parliament Act 1949). Since the passage of these Acts, the House of Commons has become the dominant branch of Parliament.

Since the 17th century, government ministers were paid, while other MPs were not. Most of the men elected to the Commons had private incomes, while a few relied on financial support from a wealthy patron. Early Labour MPs were often provided with a salary by a trade union, but this was declared illegal by a House of Lords judgement of 1909. Consequently, a resolution was passed in the House of Commons in 1911 introducing salaries for MPs.

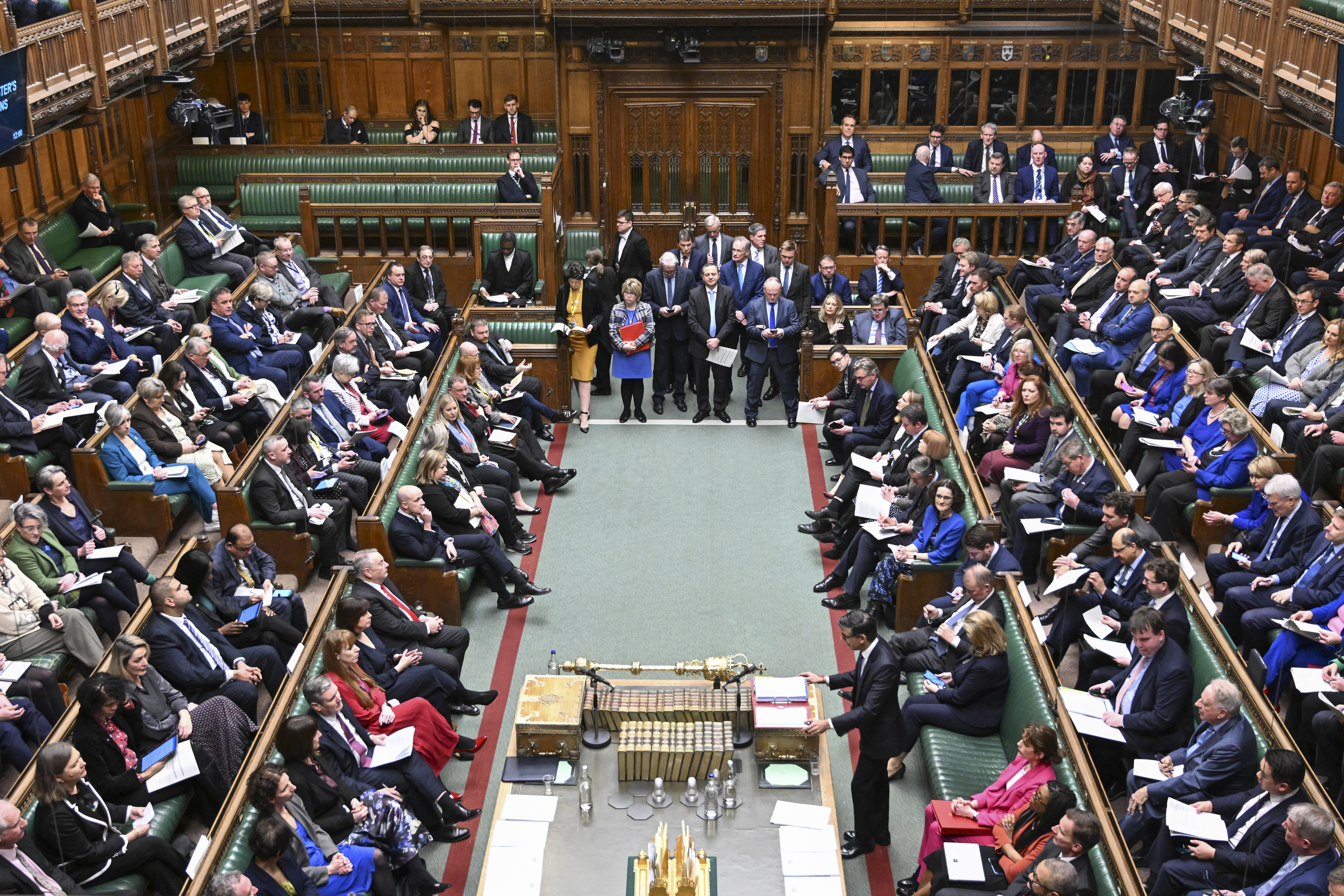
The modern chamber, which opened following post-war reconstruction in 1950

In 1918, women over 30 who owned property were given the right to vote, as were men over 21 who did not own property, quickly followed by the passage of a law enabling women to be eligible for election as members of parliament at the younger age of 21. The only woman to be elected that year was an Irish Sinn Féin candidate, Constance Markievicz, who therefore became the first woman to be an MP. However, owing to Sinn Féin's policy of abstention from Westminster, she never took her seat.

The old Chamber of the House of Commons built by Sir Charles Barry was destroyed by German bombs during the Second World War. The essential features of Barry's design were preserved when the chamber was rebuilt.

Women were given equal voting status as men in 1928, and with effect from the General Election in 1950, various forms of plural voting (i.e. some individuals had the right to vote in more than one constituency in the same election), including University constituencies, were abolished.

=== 21st century ===
In May and June 2009 revelations of MPs' expenses claims caused a major scandal and loss of confidence by the public in the integrity of MPs, as well as causing the first forced resignation of the Speaker in 300 years.

In 2011, a referendum was held, asking whether to replace the present "first-past-the-post" system with the "alternative vote" (AV) method. The proposal to introduce AV was rejected by 67.9% of voters on a national turnout of 42%.

The Fixed-term Parliaments Act 2011 was passed by the Conservative-Liberal Democrat coalition, transferring the power to call an early election from the Prime Minister to Parliament, and setting out the procedure for this. Under the act, calling an early election required a two-thirds supermajority of the house. These provisions were first used by Theresa May to trigger the 2017 snap election.

The Recall of MPs Act 2015 created a mechanism for recalling Members of Parliament. Under the act, proceedings are initiated only if an MP is found guilty of wrongdoing fulfilling certain criteria. A petition is successful if at least one in ten voters in the constituency sign. Successful petitions result in the MP vacating the seat, triggering a by-election.

In 2019, MPs used "standing order 24" (a parliamentary procedure that triggers emergency debates) as a means of gaining control of the parliamentary order paper for the following day, and passing legislation without the incumbent government's consent. This unusual process was achieved through tabling amendments to the "motion in neutral terms", a non-binding statement released by parliament after the debate. This new technique was used to pass the European Union (Withdrawal) Act 2019 in March, as well as the No. 2 Act in September, both relating to Brexit. 2019 was the year Labour and Co-operative MPs became the fourth-largest political group in the House of Commons.

In 2020, new procedures for hybrid proceedings were introduced from 22 April. These mitigated the coronavirus pandemic with measures including a limit of 50 MPs in the chamber, physical distancing and remote participation using video conferencing. Hybrid proceedings were abolished in August 2021.

Later in December 2020, the Conservative government published a draft Fixed-term Parliaments Act 2011 (Repeal) Bill, later retitled the Dissolution and Calling of Parliament Bill when it was introduced to the Commons in May 2021, which would repeal the Fixed-term Parliaments Act in its entirety, restore the monarch's prerogative powers to dissolve Parliament at the prime minister's request, and ensure that a parliamentary term automatically ends five years after Parliament's first meeting and polling day being 25 working days later. The bill was given royal assent on 24 March 2022, becoming the Dissolution and Calling of Parliament Act.

== Members and elections ==
Since 1950, every constituency has been represented by a single Member of Parliament. There remains a technical distinction between county and borough constituencies; its only effects are on the amount of money candidates are allowed to spend during campaigns and the rank of the local authority co-opted Returning Officer who presides over the count. Geographic boundaries are determined by four permanent and independent Boundary Commissions, one each for England, Wales, Scotland, and Northern Ireland. The commissions conduct general reviews of electoral boundaries once every 8 to 12 years, and interim reviews. In drawing boundaries, they are required to prefer local government boundaries, but may deviate from these to prevent great disparities in electorate; such disparities are given the formal term malapportionment. The proposals of the Boundary Commissions are subject to parliamentary approval, but may not be amended. After their next Periodic Reviews, the Boundary Commissions will be absorbed into the Electoral Commission, which was established in 2000. As of 2024, the UK is divided into 650 constituencies, with 543 in England, 32 in Wales, 57 in Scotland, and 18 in Northern Ireland. There are no seats allocated to the fourteen British Overseas Territories or the three Crown Dependencies, and there is mixed opinion from the local territorial governments about representation in Westminster from the local governments.

General elections occur whenever Parliament is dissolved, an action which is part of the royal prerogative. By convention the timing of the dissolution is chosen by the Prime Minister (see relationship with the Government above). Under the Dissolution and Calling of Parliament Act 2022, if no early election is called, dissolution is automatic on the fifth year after its first meeting day. This Act effectively postponed the automatic date of the next election after 2019 by more than half a year, from 2 May 2024 to Tuesday 28 January 2025; but the election was ultimately called for 4 July 2024.

The current regime around dissolution is substantially the same as that established by the Septennial Act 1715 (as amended by the Parliament Act 1911), under which that automatic dissolution instead occurred five years after issuance of the writ of summons, a slightly longer period. Between 2011 and 2022, the Fixed-term Parliaments Act 2011 was in force, under which control of the timing of elections instead lay with the House of Commons, which could pass a motion of no confidence or (as occurred in 2017) of early election with a two-thirds majority; absent such motions, Parliament would automatically dissolve 17 working days (about 4 weeks) before the fixed election date of the first Thursday in May five years after the previous election, which occurred (as a special case) on 7 May 2015. As an ordinary Act, it was also possible for parliament to bypass it with a special purpose Act of Parliament passed by simple majorities in both houses, which occurred in 2019.

All general elections in the UK since 1935 have been held on a Thursday. The origins of this convention are unknown but there are a number of theories, including the suggestion that it was to coincide with market day; this would ease voting for those who had to travel into the towns to cast their ballot.

A candidate for a seat must submit nomination papers signed by ten registered voters from that area, and pay £500, which is refunded if the candidate wins at least five per cent of the vote. Such a deposit seeks to discourage frivolity and very long ballot papers which would cause vote splitting (and arguably voter confusion). Each constituency is also called a seat (as it was in 1885), as it returns one member, using the first-past-the-post electoral system, under which the candidate with a plurality of votes wins, that is greatest number of votes. Minors (that is, anyone under the age of 18), members of the House of Lords, and prisoners are not qualified to become members of the House of Commons. To vote, one must be a UK resident and a citizen of either Britain, a British overseas territory, Ireland, or a member of the Commonwealth of Nations. British citizens living abroad are allowed to vote for 15 years after leaving. It is a criminal offence for a person to vote in the ballot of more than one seat which is vacant at any election. This has not always been the case: before 1948 plural voting was permitted as voters qualified by home ownership or residence and could vote under both entitlements simultaneously, as well as for a university constituency if a university graduate.

Once elected, Members of Parliament normally continue to serve until the next dissolution of Parliament. But if a member dies or ceases to be qualified (see qualifications below), their seat falls vacant. It is also possible for the House of Commons to expel a member, a power exercised only in cases of serious misconduct or criminal activity. In each case, the vacancy is filled by a by-election in the constituency, with the same electoral system as in general elections.

The term "Member of Parliament" by modern convention means a member of the House of Commons. These members may, and almost invariably do, use the post-nominal letters "MP". The annual salary of each member is £86,584 effective from 1 April 2023. Members may also receive additional salaries for other offices they hold (for instance, the Speakership). Most members also claim for various office expenses (staff costs, postage, travelling, etc.) and, in the case of members for seats outside London, for the costs of maintaining a home in the capital.

=== Qualifications ===
1. Male 383 (58.9%)
2. Female 267 (41.1%)

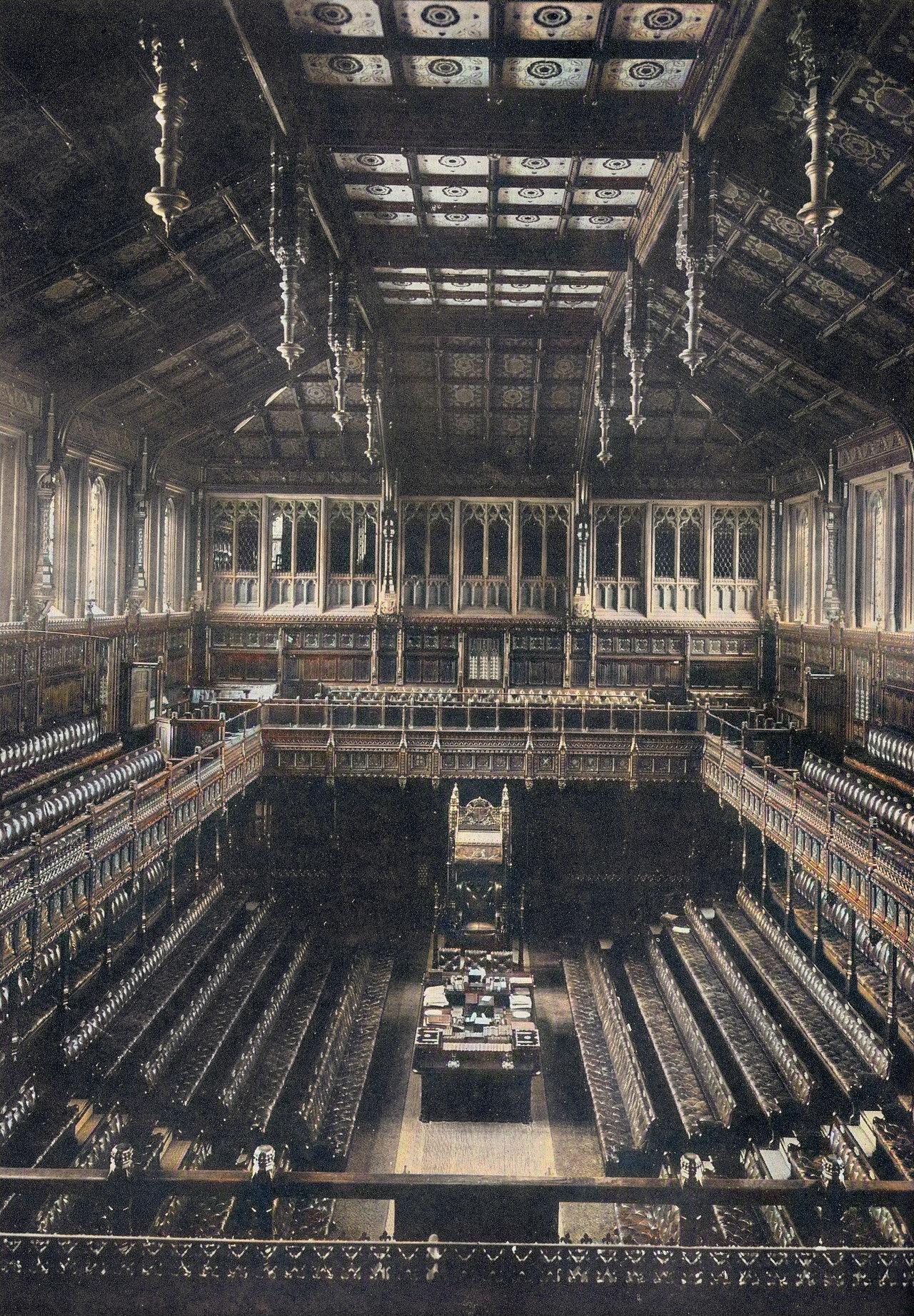
The old House of Commons chamber, showing a very dark veneer on the wood, which was purposely made much brighter in the new chamber

There are numerous qualifications that apply to Members of Parliament. One must be aged at least 18 (the minimum age was 21 until s.17 of the Electoral Administration Act 2006 came into force), and must be a citizen of the United Kingdom, of a British overseas territory, of the Republic of Ireland, or of a member state of the Commonwealth of Nations. These restrictions were introduced by the British Nationality Act 1981, but were previously far more stringent: under the Act of Settlement 1701, only natural-born subjects were qualified. Members of the House of Lords may not serve in the House of Commons, or even vote in parliamentary elections; however, they are permitted to sit in the chamber during debates (unlike the King, who cannot enter the chamber).

A person may not sit in the Commons if they are the subject of a Bankruptcy Restrictions Order (applicable in England and Wales only), or if they are adjudged bankrupt (in Northern Ireland), or if their estate is sequestered (in Scotland). Previously, MPs detained under the Mental Health Act 1983 for six months or more would have their seat vacated if two specialists reported to the Speaker that the member was suffering from a mental disorder. However, this disqualification was removed by the Mental Health (Discrimination) Act 2013. There also exists a common law precedent from the 18th century that the deaf-mute are ineligible to sit in the Lower House; this precedent, however, has not been tested in recent years.

Anyone found guilty of high treason may not sit in Parliament until she or he has either completed the term of imprisonment or received a full pardon from the Crown. Moreover, anyone serving a prison sentence of one year or more is ineligible, per Representation of the People Act 1981. Finally, members of the Senedd (Welsh Parliament) and Northern Ireland Assembly are disqualified since 2014. Article 159, Section 2 of the Representation of the People Act 1983 formerly disqualified for ten years those found guilty of certain election-related offences, until this section was repealed in 2001. Several other disqualifications are codified in the House of Commons Disqualification Act 1975: holders of high judicial offices, civil servants, members of the regular armed forces, members of foreign legislatures (excluding the Republic of Ireland and Commonwealth countries), and holders of several Crown offices. Ministers, even though they are paid officers of the Crown, are not disqualified.

The rule that precludes certain Crown officers from serving in the House of Commons is used to circumvent a resolution adopted by the House of Commons in 1623, under which members are not permitted to resign their seats. In practice, however, they always can. Should a member wish to resign from the Commons, she or he may request appointment to one of two ceremonial Crown offices: that of Crown Steward and Bailiff of the Chiltern Hundreds, or that of Crown Steward and Bailiff of the Manor of Northstead. These offices are sinecures (that is, they involve no actual duties); they are retained solely to permit the "resignation" of members of the House of Commons. The appointment is made by the Chancellor of the Exchequer after a member indicates that they wish to resign.

=== Officers ===
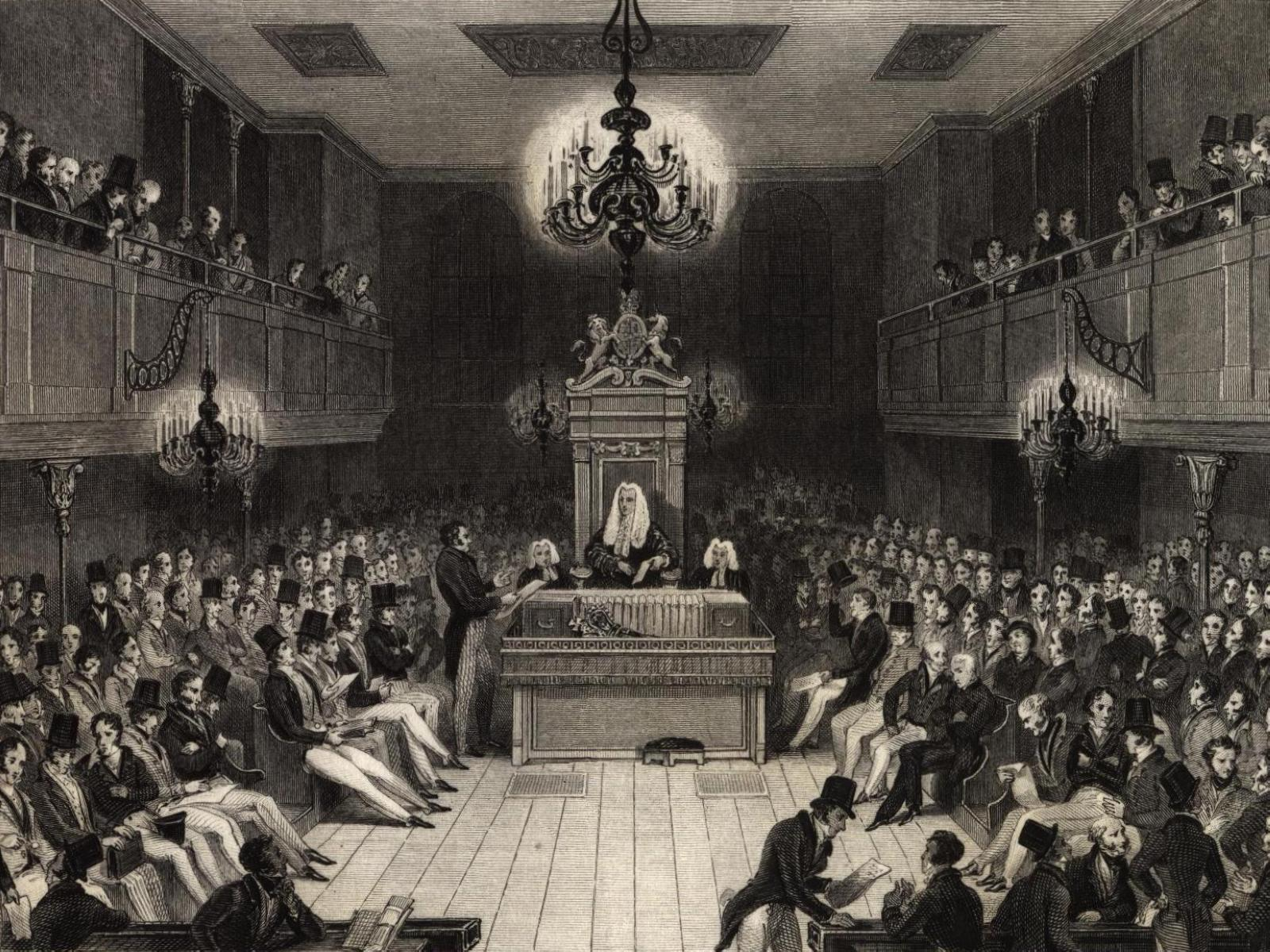
The Speaker presides over debates in the House of Commons, as depicted in the above print commemorating the destruction of the Commons Chamber by fire in 1834.

At the beginning of each new parliamentary term, the House of Commons elects one of its members as a presiding officer, known as the Speaker. If the incumbent Speaker seeks a new term, then the house may re-elect them merely by passing a motion; otherwise, a secret ballot is held. A Speaker-elect cannot take office until they have been approved by the Sovereign; the granting of the royal approbation, however, is a formality. The Speaker is assisted by three Deputy Speakers, the most senior of whom holds the title of Chairman of Ways and Means. The two other Deputy Speakers are known as the First and Second Deputy Chairman of Ways and Means. These titles derive from the Committee of Ways and Means, a body over which the chairman once used to preside; even though the committee was abolished in 1967, the traditional titles of the Deputy Speakers are still retained. The Speaker and the Deputy Speakers are always members of the House of Commons.

Whilst presiding, the Speaker or Deputy Speaker traditionally wears ceremonial dress. The presiding officer may also wear a wig, but this tradition was abandoned by Speaker Betty Boothroyd. Her successor, Michael Martin, also did not wear a wig while in the chamber. His successor, John Bercow, chose to wear a gown over a lounge suit, a decision that sparked much debate and opposition; he also did not wear a wig, and his successor Lindsay Hoyle has continued this tradition by not wearing a wig.

The Speaker or deputy presides from a chair at the front of the house. This chair was designed by Augustus Pugin, who initially built a prototype of the chair at King Edward's School, Birmingham: that chair is called Sapientia (Latin for "wisdom") and is where the chief master sits. The Speaker is also chairman of the House of Commons Commission, which oversees the running of the house, and controls debates by calling on members to speak. A member who believes that a rule (or Standing Order) has been breached may raise a "point of order", on which the Speaker makes a ruling not subject to any appeal. The Speaker may discipline members who fail to observe the rules of the house. The Speaker also decides which proposed amendments to a motion are to be debated. Thus, the Speaker is far more powerful than their Lords counterpart, the Lord Speaker, who has no disciplinary powers. Customarily, the Speaker and the deputies are non-partisan; they do not vote (with the notable exception of tied votes, where the Speaker votes in accordance with Denison's rule), or participate in the affairs of any political party. By convention, a Speaker seeking re-election to parliament is not opposed in their constituency by any of the major parties. The lack of partisanship continues even after the Speaker leaves the House of Commons.

The Clerk of the House of Commons is both the house's chief adviser on matters of procedure and chief executive of the House of Commons. They are a permanent official, not a member of the house itself. The Clerk advises the Speaker on the rules and procedure of the house, signs orders and official communications, and signs and endorses bills. The Clerk also chairs the Board of Management, which consists of the heads of the six departments of the house. The Clerk's deputy is known as the Clerk Assistant. Another officer of the house is the Serjeant-at-arms, whose duties include the maintenance of law, order, and security on the house's premises. The Serjeant-at-Arms carries the ceremonial mace, a symbol of the authority of the Crown and of the House of Commons, into the house each day before the Speaker, and the mace is laid upon the table of the house during sittings. The Librarian is head of the House of Commons Library, the house's research and information arm.

== Procedure ==
Like the Lords, the Commons meets in the Palace of Westminster in London. The Commons chamber is small and modestly decorated in green, unlike the large, lavishly furnished red Lords chamber. Benches sit on both sides of the chamber and are divided by a centre aisle. This arrangement reflects the design of St Stephen's Chapel, which served as the home of the House of Commons until destroyed by fire in 1834. The Speaker's chair is at one end of the chamber; in front of it, is the table of the house, on which the mace rests. The clerks sit at one end of the table, close to the Speaker so that they may advise them on procedure when necessary.

Members of the Government occupy the benches on the Speaker's right, whilst members of the Opposition occupy the benches on the Speaker's left. In front of each set of benches a red line is drawn, which members are traditionally not allowed to cross during debates. The Prime Minister and the government ministers, as well as the leader of the Opposition and the Shadow cabinet sit on the front rows, and are known as frontbenchers. Other members of parliament, in contrast, are known as backbenchers. Not all Members of Parliament can fit into the chamber at the same time, as it only has space to seat approximately two thirds of the Members. According to Robert Rogers, former Clerk of the House of Commons and Chief Executive, a figure of 427 seats is an average or a finger-in-the-wind estimate. Members who arrive late must stand near the entrance of the house if they wish to listen to debates. Sittings in the chamber are held each day from Monday to Thursday, and also on some Fridays. During times of national emergency, the house may also sit at weekends.

Sittings of the house are open to the public, but the house may at any time vote to sit in private, which has occurred only twice since 1950. Traditionally, a Member who desired that the house sit privately could shout "I spy strangers!" and a vote would automatically follow. In the past, when relations between the Commons and the Crown were less than cordial, this procedure was used whenever the house wanted to keep its debate private. More often, however, this device was used to delay and disrupt proceedings; as a result, it was abolished in 1998. Now, members seeking that the house sit in private must make a formal motion to that effect.

Public debates are recorded and archived in Hansard. The post war redesign of the house in 1950 included microphones, and debates were allowed to be broadcast by radio in 1975. Since 1989, they have also been broadcast on television, which is now handled by BBC Parliament.

Sessions of the House of Commons have sometimes been disrupted by angry protesters throwing objects into the chamber from the galleries—items thrown include leaflets, manure, flour, and a canister of chlorobenzylidene malonitrile (tear gas). Even members have been known to disturb proceedings of the house. For instance, in 1976, Conservative MP Michael Heseltine seized and brandished the mace of the house during a heated debate. However, perhaps the most famous disruption of the House of Commons was caused by Charles I, who entered the Commons Chamber in 1642 with an armed force to arrest five members for high treason. This action was deemed a breach of the privilege of the house, and has given rise to the tradition that the monarch does not set foot in the House of Commons.

Each year, the parliamentary session begins with the State Opening of Parliament, a ceremony in the Lords Chamber during which the Sovereign, in the presence of Members of both Houses, delivers an address outlining the Government's legislative agenda. The Gentleman or Lady Usher of the Black Rod (a Lords official) is responsible for summoning the Commons to the Lords Chamber. When he arrives to deliver his summons, the doors of the Commons Chamber are traditionally slammed shut in his face, symbolising the right of the Lower House to debate without interference. He then knocks on the door three times with his Black Rod, and only then is granted admittance, where he informs the MPs that the Monarch awaits them, after which they proceed to the House of Lords for the King's Speech.

During debates, Members may speak only if called upon by the Speaker (or a Deputy Speaker, if the Speaker is not presiding). Traditionally, the presiding officer alternates between calling Members from the Government and Opposition. The Prime Minister, the Leader of the Opposition, and other leaders from both sides are normally given priority. All Privy Counsellors used to be granted priority; however, the modernisation of Commons procedure in 1998 led to the abolition of this tradition.

Speeches are addressed to the presiding officer, using the words "Mr Speaker", "Madam Speaker", "Mr Deputy Speaker", or "Madam Deputy Speaker". Only the presiding officer may be directly addressed in debate; other members must be referred to in the third person. Traditionally, members do not refer to each other by name, but by constituency, using forms such as "the Honourable Member for [constituency]", or, in the case of Privy Counsellors, "the Right Honourable Member for [constituency]". Members of the same party (or allied parties or groups) refer to each other as "my (Right) Honourable friend". A currently serving, or ex-member, of the Armed Forces is referred to as "the Honourable and Gallant Member" (a barrister used to be called "the Honourable and Learned Member", and a woman "the Honourable Lady the Member".) This may not always be the case during the actual oral delivery, when it might be difficult for a member to remember another member's exact constituency, but it is invariably followed in the transcript entered in the Hansard. The Speaker enforces the rules of the house and may warn and punish members who deviate from them. Disregarding the Speaker's instructions is considered a breach of the rules of the House and may result in the suspension of the offender from the house. In the case of grave disorder, the Speaker may adjourn the house without taking a vote.

The Standing Orders of the House of Commons do not establish any formal time limits for debates. The Speaker may, however, order a member who persists in making a tediously repetitive or irrelevant speech to stop speaking. The time set aside for debate on a particular motion is, however, often limited by informal agreements between the parties. Debate may also be restricted by the passage of "allocation of time motions", which are more commonly known as "guillotine motions". Alternatively, the house may put an immediate end to debate by passing a motion to invoke closure. The Speaker is allowed to deny the motion if she or he believes that it infringes upon the rights of the minority. Today, bills are scheduled according to a timetable motion, which the whole house agrees in advance, negating the use of a guillotine.

When the debate concludes, or when the closure is invoked, the motion is put to a vote. The house first votes by voice vote; the Speaker or Deputy Speaker puts the question, and Members respond either "Aye!" (in favour of the motion) or "No!" (against the motion). The presiding officer then announces the result of the voice vote, but if their assessment is challenged by any member or the voice vote is unclear, a recorded vote known as a division follows. The presiding officer, if she or he believes that the result of the voice vote is clear, may reject the challenge. When a division occurs, members enter one of two lobbies (the "Aye" lobby or the "No" lobby) on either side of the chamber, where their names are recorded by clerks. A member who wishes to pointedly abstain from a vote may do so by entering both lobbies, casting one vote for and one against. At each lobby are two tellers (themselves MPs) who count the votes of the members.

Once the division concludes, the tellers provide the results to the presiding officer, who then announces them to the house. If the votes are tied, the Speaker or Deputy Speaker has a casting vote. Traditionally, this casting vote is exercised according to Speaker Denison's rule: to allow further debate, if this is possible, or otherwise to avoid a decision without a majority (e.g. voting "no" to a motion or the third reading of a bill). Ties rarely occur: more than 25 years passed between the last two ones in July 1993 and April 2019. The quorum of the House of Commons is 40 members for any vote, including the Speaker and four tellers. If fewer than 40 members have participated, the division is invalid.

Formerly, if a member sought to raise a point of order during a division, suggesting that some of the rules governing parliamentary procedure are violated, he was required to wear a hat, thereby signalling that he was not engaging in debate. Collapsible top hats were kept in the chamber just for this purpose. This custom was discontinued in 1998.

The outcome of most votes is largely known beforehand, since political parties normally instruct members on how to vote. A party normally entrusts some members of parliament, known as whips, with the task of ensuring that all party members vote as desired. Members of Parliament do not tend to vote against such instructions, since those who do so jeopardise promotion, or may be deselected as party candidates for future elections. Ministers, junior ministers and parliamentary private secretaries who vote against the whips' instructions usually resign. Thus, the independence of Members of Parliament tends to be low, although "backbench rebellions" by members discontent with their party's policies do occur. A member is also traditionally allowed some leeway if the particular interests of his constituency are adversely affected. In some circumstances, however, parties announce "free votes", allowing members to vote as they please. Votes relating to issues of conscience such as abortion and capital punishment are typically free votes.

Pairing is an arrangement where a member from one party agrees with a member of another party not to vote in a particular division, allowing both MPs the opportunity not to attend.

A bisque is permission from the Whips given to a member to miss a vote or debate in the house to attend to constituency business or other matters.

== Committees ==
The British Parliament uses committees for a variety of purposes, e.g., for the review of bills. Committees consider bills in detail, and may make amendments. Bills of great constitutional importance, as well as some important financial measures, are usually sent to the "Committee of the Whole House", a body that includes all members of the Commons. Instead of the Speaker, the chairman or a Deputy Chairman of Ways and Means presides. The committee meets in the House of Commons Chamber.

Most bills were until 2006 considered by standing committees, which consisted of between 16 and 50 members. The membership of each standing committee roughly reflected the strength of the parties in the House. The membership of standing committees changed constantly; new Members were assigned each time the committee considered a new bill. The number of standing committees was not limited, but usually only ten existed. Rarely, a bill was committed to a Special Standing Committee, which investigated and held hearings on the issues raised. In November 2006, standing committees were replaced by public bill committees.

The House of Commons also has several departmental select committees. The membership of these bodies, like that of the standing committees, reflects the strength of the parties. The chairman of each committee is voted on in a secret ballot of the whole house during the first session of a parliamentary term, or when a vacancy occurs. The number of select committee chairmanships allocated to each party reflects the strength of the parties, and the parties allocate the positions through agreement. The primary function of a departmental select committee is to scrutinise and investigate the activities of a particular government department. To fulfil these aims, it is permitted to hold hearings and collect evidence. Bills may be referred to Departmental Select Committees, but such a procedure is seldom used.

A separate type of select committee is the Domestic Committee. Domestic Committees oversee the administration of the House and the services provided to Members. Other committees of the House of Commons include Joint Committees (which also include members of the House of Lords), the Committee on Standards and Privileges (which considers questions of parliamentary privilege, as well as matters relating to the conduct of the members), and the Committee of Selection (which determines the membership of other committees).

== Commons symbol ==
The symbol used by the Commons consists of a portcullis topped by St Edward's Crown. The portcullis has been one of the Royal badges of England since the accession of the Tudors in the 15th century, and was a favourite symbol of King Henry VII. It was originally the badge of Beaufort, his mother's family; and a pun on the name Tudor, as in tu-door. The original badge was of gold, but nowadays is shown in various colours, predominantly green or black. It features on the flag of the House of Commons; first flown on 11 May 2021 and designed by Graham Bartram, chief vexillologist of the Flag Institute at the request of speaker, Sir Lindsay Hoyle.

== In film and television ==
In 1986, the British television production company Granada Television created a near-full size replica of the post-1950 House of Commons debating chamber at its studios in Manchester for use in its adaptation of the Jeffrey Archer novel First Among Equals. The set was highly convincing, and was retained after the production—since then, it has been used in nearly every British film and television production that has featured scenes set in the chamber. From 1988 until 1999 it was also one of the prominent attractions on the Granada Studios Tour, where visitors could watch actors performing mock political debates on the set. The major difference between the studio set and the real House of Commons Chamber is that the studio set has just four rows of seats on either side whereas the real Chamber has five.

In 2002, the set was purchased by the scriptwriter Paul Abbott so that it could be used in his BBC drama serial State of Play. Abbott, a former Granada Television staff writer, bought it because the set would otherwise have been destroyed and he feared it would take too long to get the necessary money from the BBC. Abbott kept the set in storage in Oxford.

The pre-1941 Chamber was recreated in Shepperton Studios for the Ridley Scott/Richard Loncraine 2002 biographical film on Churchill, The Gathering Storm.

== Historical composition ==
Note that bloc strengths in general are an approximation, with many MPs' allegiances unknown until the mid-19th century.

=== House of Commons of England ===
==== Kingdom of England ====
The first English parliament had been called in 1236, developing out of the Curia regis due to the crisis of the First Barons' War and ascension of Henry III. However it was not until the reign of Charles I during the Bishops' War that political factions within can be discerned. This list as such begins with the Short Parliament.

	Opposition / Position Unclear / Moderates	Total seats
Feb 1640 (Short)	513	513
Nov 1640 (Long)*	204 / 250 / 59	513
*seat tally is according to the vote to execute the Earl of Strafford.

==== Commonwealth of England ====
Religious Radicals (Harrison) / Executioners / Position Unclear / Moderates (Lambert) / Negotiators		Total seats
1645 (Long)	majority pro-negotiation	470
1648 (Rump)	mostly pro-execution	210
1653 (Barebone's)*	47 / 17 / 76	140
*Note that while the Nominated Assembly would come to be known as "Barebone's Parliament", it was at formation not a parliament, and sat at Whitehall, not Westminster.

==== The Protectorate ====
Barred / Boycotting / Commonwealthsmen / Position Unclear / Protectorate / Major Generals / Restorationists/ Crypto-Royalists		Total seats
1654 (1st)	2 / ~448 / ~10	460
1656 (2nd)	~100 / ~50 / ~10	460
Jan 1659 (3rd)	223 / 171 / 134 / 39	567
May 1659 (Rump Restoration)	majority commonwealthsmen	78
May 1660 (Long Restoration)	~40 / ~100	~140

==== Kingdom of England (Restored) ====
Old Parliamentarians / Country / Country defectors / Whigs / Position Unclear / Tories / Court defectors / Court / old Royalists		Total seats
1660	180 / 208 / 110	548*
1661	95 / 44 / 82 / 297	522*
Mar 1679	218 / 167 / 137	522*
Oct 1679	310 / 220	530*
1681	309 / 193	502*
1685	57 / 468	525*
1689	174 / 190 / 151	551*
1690	241 / 28 / 243	512
1695	257 / 28 / 203	513*
1698	246 / 59 / 208	513*
Jan 1701	219 / 45 / 249	513
Nov 1701	248 / 25 / 240	513
1702	184 / 31 / 298	513
*due to difficulties in records, seat totals are uncertain and may not sum correctly.

=== House of Commons of Great Britain ===
Whigs / Position Unclear / Scottish Ministerial Support / Patriot Whigs / Tories		Total seats
1708	268 / 20 / 45 / 225	558
1710	196 / 16 / 346	558
1713	161 / 28 / 369	558
1715	341 / 217	558
1722	389 / 169	558
1734	330 / 83 / 145	558
1741	186 / 131 / 136	558
1747	338 / 97 / 117	558
1754	368 / 42 / 106	558
1761	446 / 112	558

==== 1768–1806 ====
Radical / Foxites / Rockinghamites / Grenvillites / Bedfordites / Position Unclear / Ministerialist/Northite/Pittite / Addingtonian / Former Tories		Total seats
1768	1 / 57 / 31 / 20 / 175 / 221 / 53	558
1774	1 / 215 / 343	558
1780	1 / 254 / 260	558
1784	1 / 155 / 122 / 280	558
1790	183 / 35 / 340	558
1796	95 / 39 / 424	558
1802 (UK)	2 / 124 / 25 / 57 / 57 / 410	658

=== House of Commons of the United Kingdom ===
==== 1806 – 1868 ====
Chartists / Irish Confederate / LNRA / Radicals / Whigs* / Liberals / Others / Conservatives / Tories / Ultra-Tories		Total seats
1806	431 / 228	658
1807	1 / 213 / 223 / 216	658
1812	1 / 196 / 62 / 399	658
1818	1 / 4 / 175 / 198 / 280	658
1820	4 / 4 / 215 / 94 / 341	658
1826	5 / 198 / 27 / 428	658
1830	4 / 196 / 148 / 250 / 60	658
1831	6 / 370 / 47 / 235	658
1832	42 / 441 / 175	658
1835	385 / 273	658
1837	344 / 314	658
1841	20 / 271 / 367	658
1847	1 / 2 / 36 / 292 / 325	656
1852	324 / 330	654
1857	13 / 377 / 264	658
1859	356 / 298	658
1865	369 / 289	658
1868	387 / 271	658
*Includes members affiliated with the Radicals and LNRA during the period of alliance under the Lichfield House Compact

==== 1874 – 1918 ====
SF / Crofters / NSP / LRC / ILP / Lab / Ind Lab / Co-op / Ind / Lib-Lab / Lib / Ind Lib / HRL / IFL / IPP / AFIL / INF / C. Lab / NDLP / C. Lib / Ind Con / Con / UULA / NADSS / Nat		Total seats*
1874	2 / 241 / 60 / 350	651
1880	3 / 349 / 63 / 237	651
1885	4 / 1 / 318 / 11 / 86 / 2 / 247	670
1886	191 / 85 / 393	670
1892	3 / 270 / 1 / 9 / 72 / 314	670
1895	176 / 12 / 70 / 411	669
1900	2 / 182 / 1 / 76 / 6 / 402	669
1906	29 / 1 / 1 / 397 / 82 / 1 / 3 / 156	669
Jan 1910	40 / 274 / 1 / 71 / 8 / 3 / 1 / 271	669
Dec 1910	42 / 272 / 74 / 8 / 2 / 1 / 271	670
1918	73 / 1 / 57 / 2 / 1 / 2 / 35 / 1 / 7 / 4 / 9 / 128 / 1 / 1 / 378 / 3 / 1 / 2	706
*seat tallies and totals do not include the Speaker of the House, who has traditionally severed all ties with their party while in office since the mid 19th century.

==== 1922 – 1959 ====
CPGB / SF / CWP/Ind. prog / Irish Lab / ILP / misc. Lab / Lab / Ind Lab / Co-op / NLO / SPP / Lib / Ind Lib / Nat Lib (1922) / Ind / Nat / Ind Nat / Nat Gov / Nat Lib (1931) / Ind Con / Con / Cons		Total seats*
1922	1 / 138 / 1 / 4 / 1 / 61 / 1 / 53 / 3 / 2 / 1 / 3 / 344 / 1	614
1923	185 / 6 / 1 / 157 / 1 / 3 / 2 / 1 / 258	614
1924	1 / 146 / 5 / 1 / 39 / 2 / 1 / 412 / 7	614
1929	287 / 1 / 1 / 59 / 4 / 2 / 1 / 259	614
1931	3 / 3 / 46 / 13 / 33 / 4 / 3 / 2 / 4 / 35 / 469	614
1935	1 / 4 / 154 / 8 / 17 / 4 / 2 / 2 / 3 / 33 / 386	614
1945	2 / 2 / 3 / 393 / 2 / 12 / 2 / 8 / 2 / 4 / 11 / 2 / 196	639
1950	315 / 9 / 1 / 2 / 297	624
1951	1 / 295 / 6 / 1 / 1 / 320	624
1955	2 / 277 / 6 / 344	629
1959	258 / 6 / 1 / 364	629
*does not include the Speaker of the House.

==== Since 1964 ====
SF / Respect / Unity / Ind Rep / RLP/SDLP / PC / Green / Lab / Ind Lab / DLP / Ind / SNP / ICHC / Lib / SDP-Lib / Lib Dem / APNI / Con / UUP / UPUP / Reform / UKIP / UKUP / PUP/DUP / TUV / VUPP/UUUP		Total seats*
1964	317 / 9 / 303	629
1966	1 / 363 / 12 / 253	629
1970	2 / 1 / 287 / 1 / 1 / 6 / 330 / 1	629
Feb 1974	1 / 2 / 301 / 1 / 1 / 7 / 14 / 296 / 7 / 1 / 3	634
Oct 1974	1 / 3 / 319 / 11 / 13 / 276 / 6 / 1 / 3	634
1979	1 / 1 / 2 / 268 / 2 / 11 / 339 / 5 / 1 / 3 / 1	634
1983	1 / 1 / 2 / 208 / 2 / 23 / 397 / 11 / 1 / 3	649
1987	1 / 3 / 3 / 229 / 3 / 22 / 375 / 9 / 1 / 3	649
1992	4 / 4 / 271 / 3 / 20 / 336 / 9 / 1 / 3	651
1997	2 / 3 / 4 / 418 / 6 / 1 / 46 / 165 / 1 / 2	658
2001	4 / 3 / 4 / 412 / 5 / 1 / 52 / 166 / 6 / 5	658
2005	4 / 1 / 3 / 4 / 355 / 1 / 6 / 1 / 62 / 198 / 1 / 9	645
2010	5 / 3 / 3 / 1 / 258 / 6 / 57 / 1 / 306 / 1 / 8	649
2015	4 / 3 / 3 / 1 / 232 / 56 / 8 / 330 / 1 / 2 / 1 / 8	649
2017	7 / 4 / 1 / 262 / 35 / 12 / 317 / 1 / 10	649
2019	7 / 2 / 4 / 1 / 202 / 48 / 11 / 1 / 365 / 8	650
2024	7 / 5 / 2 / 4 / 4 / 411 / 9 / 72 / 1 / 121 / 1 / 5 / 1 / 5 / 1	649
*does not include the Speaker of the House.

== See also ==
=== Procedure ===
- Adjournment debate
- Introduction (British House of Commons)
- Vote Bundle
- List of stewards of the Chiltern Hundreds
- Early day motion
- Constituencies of the Parliament of the United Kingdom
- Salaries of members of the United Kingdom Parliament

=== Counterparts ===
- Australian House of Representatives
- House of Commons of Canada
- New Zealand House of Representatives

=== Other ===
- Parliament in the Making
- UK Parliament Week
- Parliamentary Archives
- Parliamentary Brief
- Records of members of parliament of the United Kingdom
- Proposed relocation of the Parliament of the United Kingdom

== Bibliography ==
- May, Erskine. (1896). Constitutional History of England since the Accession of George the Third, 11th ed. London: Longmans, Green and Co.
- Mackenzie, K. R., "The English Parliament", (1950) Pelican Books.
- "Parliament" (1911). Encyclopædia Britannica, 11th ed. London: Cambridge University Press.
- Pollard, Albert F. (1926). The Evolution of Parliament, 2nd ed. London: Longmans, Green and Co.
- Porritt, Edward, and Annie G. Porritt. (1903). The Unreformed House of Commons: Parliamentary Representation before 1832. Cambridge: Cambridge University Press.
- Raphael, D. D., Donald Limon, and W. R. McKay. (2004). Erskine May: Parliamentary Practice, 23rd ed. London: Butterworths Tolley.
